= Paradise Theatre (Toronto) =

Coordinates: 43.661028°N 79.430649°W

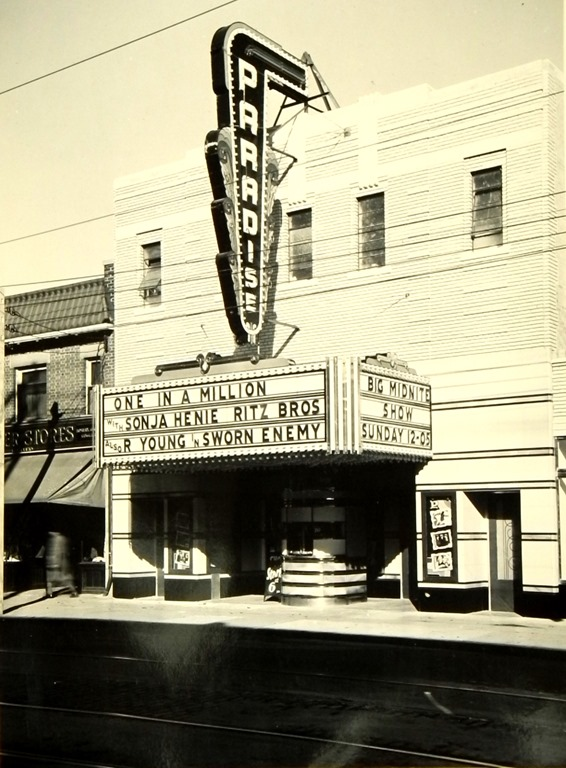
- The Paradise Theatre in 1937.

General information
- Type: Cinema
- Location: 1006 Bloor Street West, Toronto, Ontario, Canada
- Opened: 1937

Design and construction
- Architect: Benjamin Brown

Other information
- Public transit: Dufferin station Ossington station

Website
- paradiseonbloor.com

The Paradise Theatre is a movie theatre located at 1006 Bloor Street West in the Bloorcourt Village neighbourhood of Toronto, Ontario, Canada. It first opened in 1937, closed in 2006, and then was to be turned into a pharmacy. However, it was restored and re-opened on December 5, 2019. The renovations included luxury features, such as an attached restaurant, bar, and table service to the premium patrons in the balcony.

== Overview ==
Architect Benjamin Brown designed the theatre in the Art Deco style. As originally built, the theatre provided 643 seats, 177 of them in a small balcony. It also had a small stage, and two dressing rooms, for live acts.

According to local historian Doug Taylor, the theatre had multiple owners over the years. It showed erotic films in the 1980s that Taylor described as so mild they could be shown on broadcast television today. From the 1990s until its 2006 closure, it was one of a small network of Toronto repertory cinemas.

In 2007, the building was given a heritage designation which, in theory, would prevent it from being demolished. However, Taylor noted that Toronto's heritage designation bylaws were weak, and its designation was not a guarantee that it would not be torn down.

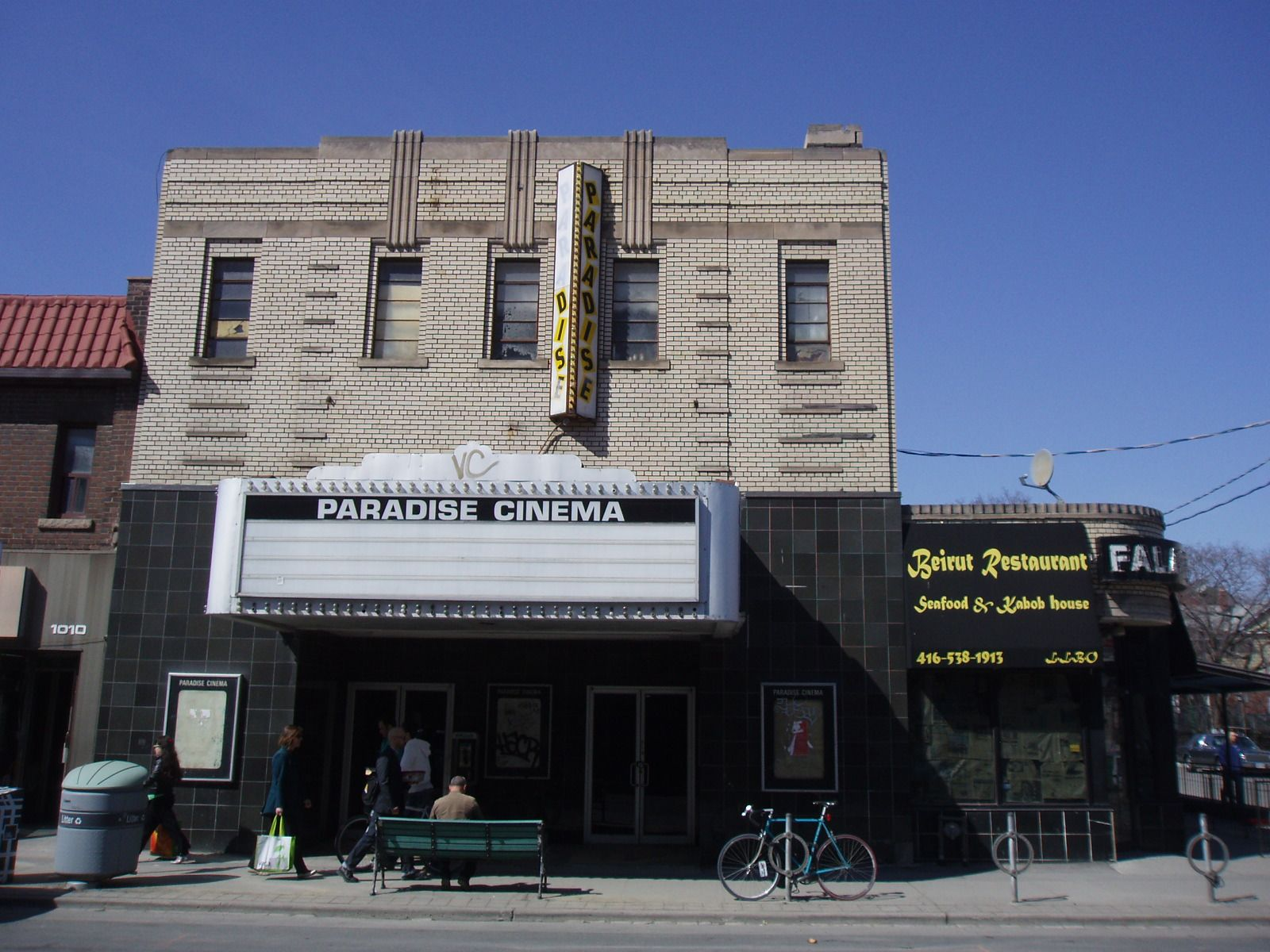
Exterior view in 2013

The building was bought in 2013 by Moray Tawse, a co-founder of First National Financial Corporation. In a profile celebrating its re-opening, Toronto Star movie critic Peter Howell wrote that Tawse was motivated to restore it by his love of a cinema of similar vintage, where his mother worked when he was a child.

After Tawse's renovations, the theatre now seats 186 patrons on the ground floor, while the balcony has just 22 seats. His renovations include provision for live acts. Tawse's renovations also included turning the small Italian grocery store next door into a restaurant, and adding a second storey to hold a bar - both to open in 2020.

On December 5, 2019, the night of the re-opening, the theatre hosted an instance of the Basement Revue, an ongoing series of live performances.

The theatre also hosts the annual Toronto Independent Film Festival, a four-day screening series of independent films held each year near or immediately after the conclusion of the Toronto International Film Festival.
