= Dovercourt Park =

- Neighbourhood
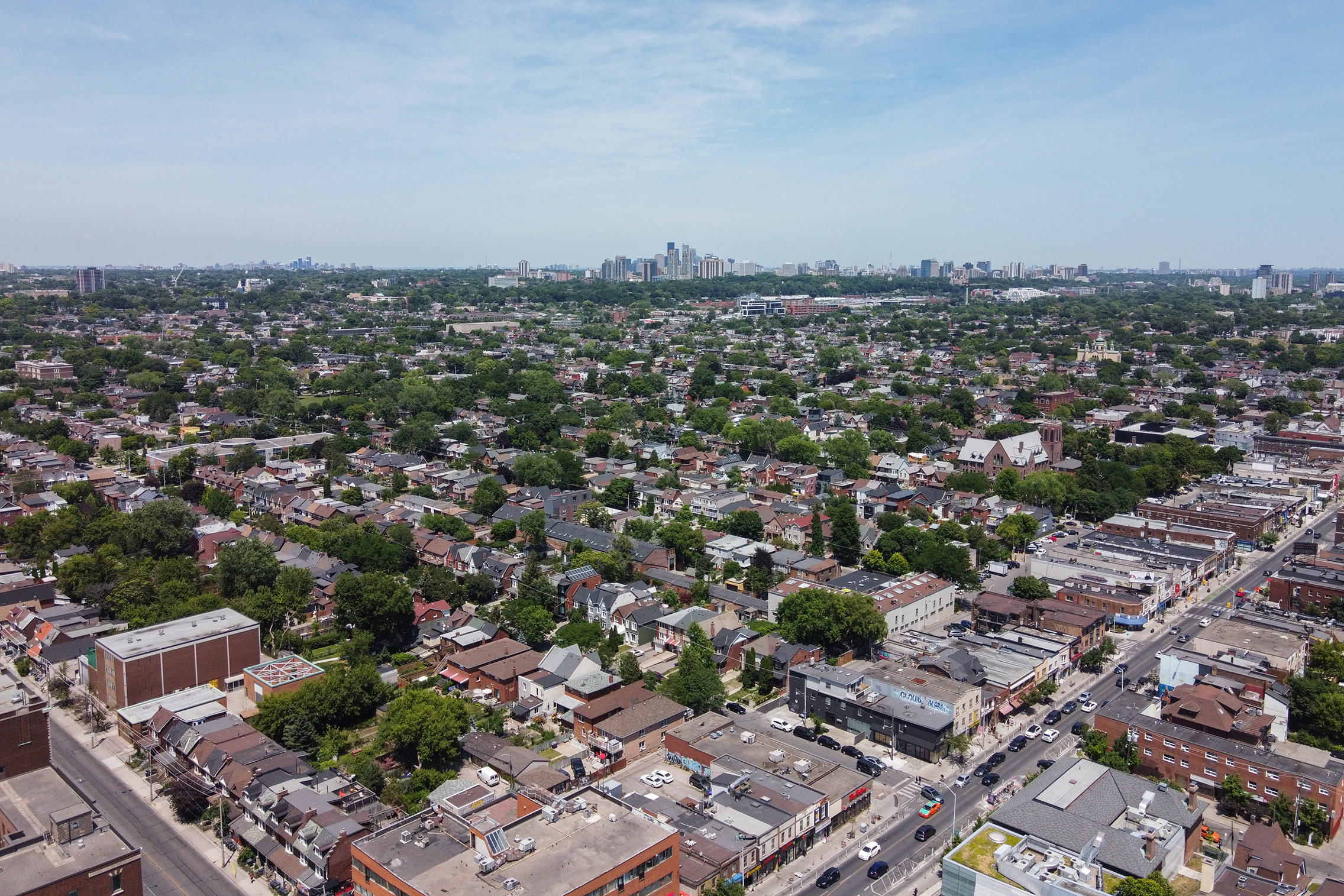
- Aerial view of Dovercourt Park in 2022

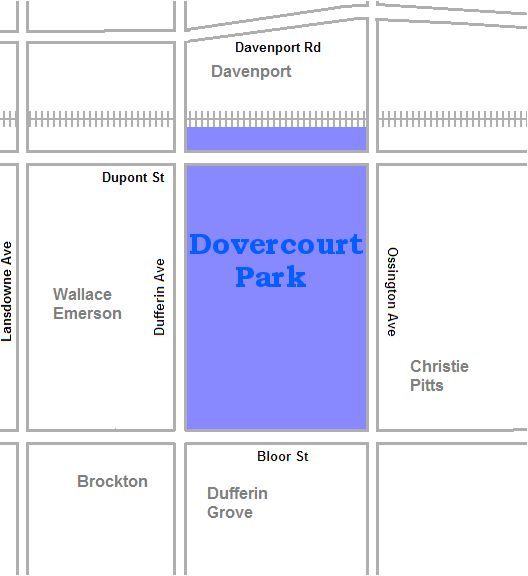

- Location within Toronto
- Coordinates: 43.665°N 79.432°W
- Country: Canada
- Province: Ontario
- City: Toronto
- Established: 1792 York County
- Township: 1793 York Township
- Annexed: 1910 Toronto

Government
  - City Councillor: Alejandra Bravo (Ward 9); Dianne Saxe (Ward 11)
  - Federal M.P.: Julie Dzerowicz (Davenport)
  - Provincial M.P.P.: Marit Stiles (Davenport)

Area
  - Total: 0.863 km^{2} (0.333 sq mi)

Population (2021)
  - Total: 7,679
  - Density: 8,898/km^{2} (23,050/sq mi)

Dovercourt Park or Dovercourt Village is a neighbourhood in Toronto, Ontario, Canada situated north of Bloor Street between Christie Street to the east, the CPR railway lines to the north, and Dufferin Street to the west.

== History ==
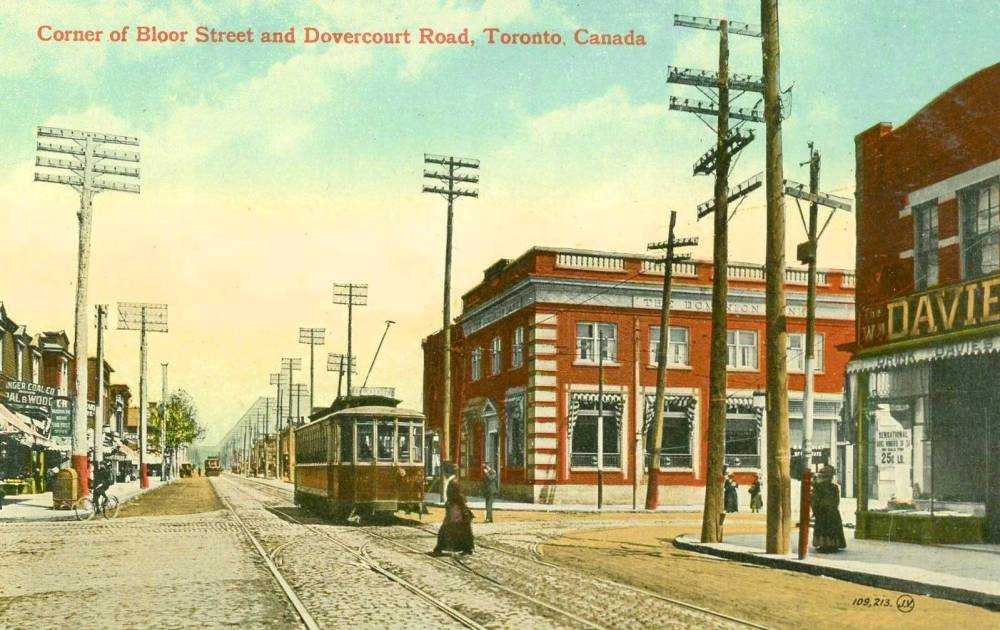
Dovercourt from Dovercourt Road and Bloor Street (c. 1910). The village was annexed by Toronto in 1910.

The Village of Dovercourt, located north of Dupont, was founded in the 1870s. Its residents were originally poor immigrants from England living in dozens of one and two bedroom tar and paper shacks which initially resulted in the village being called a shantytown. The village was annexed by the old City of Toronto in 1910 along with the Earlscourt area. City services were extended to the neighbourhood helping stimulate its growth and development by 1923. The name Dovercourt comes from the name of the home of the Denison estate, located west of Dundas and Ossington.

== Character ==
The neighbourhood contains a mixture of land-uses. The main thoroughfare of Bloor Street consists almost exclusively of mixed-use residential and commercial buildings. The Bloorcourt Village BIA posts its streetlamp banners on Bloor between Dufferin and Montrose.

The buildings along Bloor Street are typically two or three stories tall, with retail commercial on the main floor, and offices or rental housing on the remainder. These converted residential structures are the oldest in the district and are often in poor repair. Pigeon infestation remains an issue for tenants. At Dovercourt Road, a large, high-rise apartment complex houses lower-middle-income tenants on the southwest corner.

Businesses on Dovercourt and Hallam, centred on the intersection of Dovercourt Road and Hallam Street have formed their own BIA, the 'Dovercourt Village'. The boundaries stretch from Dupont south to Shanley and east-west from Salem to Ossington Avenue.

The residential area north of Bloor Street is primarily single-family dwellings. Many of these structures have been converted into apartments, housing up to eight separate units. Side-streets increase in zoned density as they approach Bloor. Low and medium-rise apartments occupy the majority of these zones.

To the north, between Dupont and Davenport, is mainly post-industrial development. Limited manufacturing remains, although some warehouse and light automotive industries still exist. While the Canadian Pacific Railway operates a main line between the two thoroughfares, a large amount of former industrial space has been converted to loft condominia. Some single-family rowhouses and low-income rental space has also been created.

The Bloor-Gladstone branch of the Toronto Public Library, dating from 1912, is situated at Bloor and Gladstone Avenue, one block east of Dufferin Avenue. From 2006 to 2009 the library was closed for renovation. It reopened to the public on July 23, 2009.

== Demographics ==
Historical population
Year	Pop.	±%
2006	8,497	—
2011	8,119	−4.4%
2016	8,089	−0.4%
2021	7,679	−5.1%

For city demographics purposes the area is amalgamated with neighbouring areas to form Dovercourt-Wallace Emerson-Junction It is an ethnically diverse area. A majority of residents are fluent in Portuguese, Italian and English. A large Ethiopian population is also present in the area. There are many shops along Bloor Street serving the Portuguese and Ethiopian communities.

In the 2006 Canadian census Dovercourt Park was covered by census tracts 0095.00 and 0096.00. According to that census, the neighbourhood has 8,497 residents, a 9.2% decrease from the 2001 census. Average income is $28,311, below the average for Toronto. The ten most common language native languages, after English, are:

1. Portuguese - 13.1%
2. Unspecified Chinese - 3.5%
3. Spanish - 3.5%
4. Italian - 3.4%
5. Cantonese - 2.8%
6. Greek - 1.5%
7. Mandarin - 1.5%
8. Vietnamese - 1.0%
9. French - 0.8%
10. Urdu - 0.7%

=== Income ===
Census Tract 0095.00 reported that the average income in 2006 was $27,597 and rose to $35,649 by 2011. Additionally, the neighbourhood reported that the median income in 2006 was $20,322 while in 2011 it was $27,597. This meant that 46% of the populations in 2006 were below the median income in Canada, which was $27,258 while, in 2011 that number dropped to 35%.

Census Tract 0096.00 reported a median income of $22,838 in 2006 and $23,721 in 2011, representing an increase of $883. Furthermore, the average income was $28,766 in 2006 and $34,228 in 2011. Compared to the average income of Canada, which was $40,650, over 68% of the population fell below the national average.

=== Visible minority population ===
For Census Tract 0096.00, Chinese people represented the largest visible minority group in 2006 and 2011. The second largest community in 2011 were Latin Americans who increased by a fifth in size. During the same period, the Filipino population almost tripled in size, which moved it from the fifth largest visible minority group to the third largest. South Asians previously represented the second largest visible minority group, but they decreased by one third, resulting in a drop to fourth place. Finally, Black people remained unchanged between both years.

== Education ==
- Dovercourt Junior Public School is a public elementary school on Bartlett Avenue, north of Hallam.
- Essex Public School is a public elementary school and middle school on Essex Street, east of Shaw.
- Pauline Public School is a public elementary school on Pauline Avenue, north-west of Bloor and Dufferin.
- St Anthony Catholic School is a Roman Catholic school on Gladstone, north of Shanly

== Transportation ==
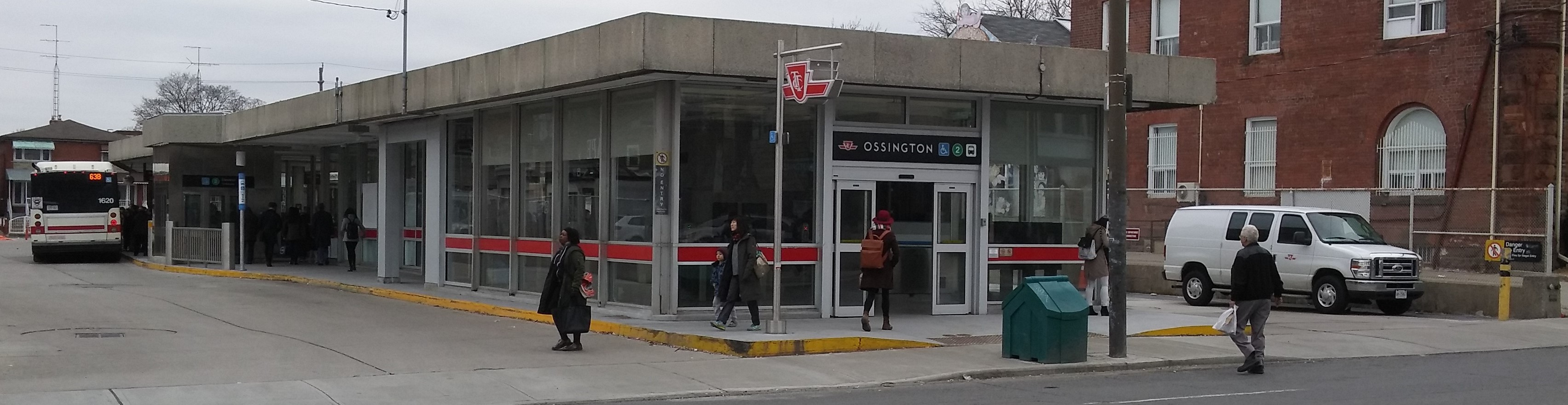
Located in Dovercourt Park, Ossington station is a stop on the Bloor–Danforth subway line.

Ossington and Dufferin stations on the Bloor–Danforth line serve the neighbourhood. The Dufferin bus runs north-south from Dufferin station and the Ossington and Rogers Road bus lines run north from Ossington station.

== See also ==
- Dovercourt (provincial electoral district)
