= Bloorcourt Village =

Coordinates: 43.66°N 79.427°W

Bloorcourt Village is a Business Improvement Area in Toronto, Ontario, Canada along Bloor Street east of Dufferin Street. It is located on the southern edge of the Dovercourt Park neighbourhood. This is west of downtown, and located within the former City of Toronto.

== Character ==
The buildings along Bloor Street are typically two or three stories tall, with retail commercial on the main floor, and offices or rental housing on the remainder. These converted residential structures are the oldest in the district and some are in poor repair. Pigeon infestation remains an issue for tenants.

The Bloor-Gladstone branch of the Toronto Public Library, dating from 1912, is situated at Bloor and Gladstone Avenue, one block east of Dufferin Avenue. There are many shops along Bloor Street serving the Portuguese and Ethiopian communities of the Dufferin Grove and Dovercourt-Wallace neighbourhoods.

== Transportation ==
Ossington and Dufferin stations on the Bloor–Danforth line serve the area.
