= Wellesley station =

Toronto subway station

Wellesley
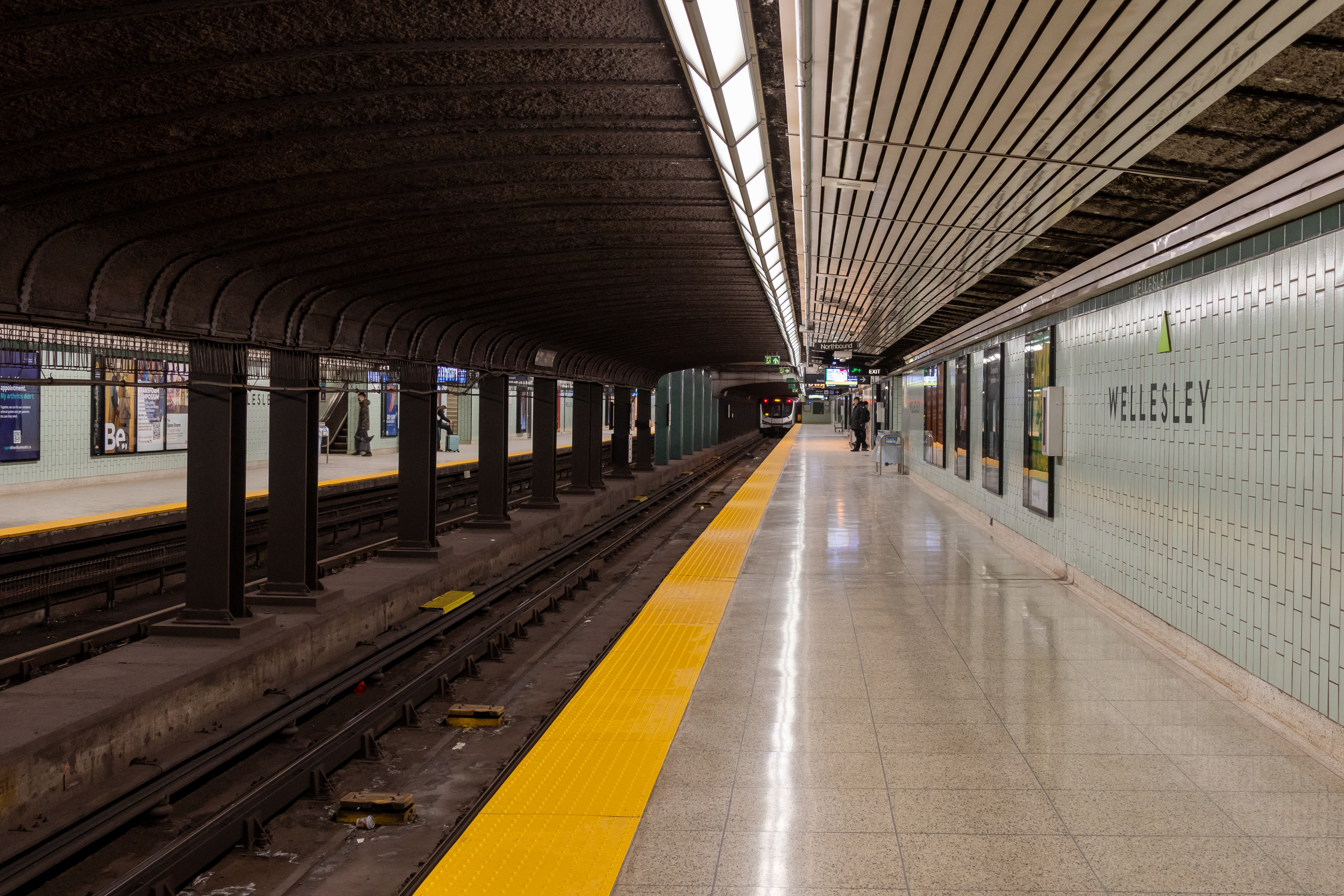

General information
- Location: 16 Wellesley Street East; Toronto, Ontario; Canada
- Coordinates: 43°39′56″N 79°23′02″W
- Platforms: Side platforms
- Tracks: 2
- Connections: TTC buses: 94 Wellesley; 97 Yonge; 320 Yonge

Construction
- Structure type: Underground
- Accessible: Yes

Other information
- Website: Official station page

History
- Opened: March 30, 1954; 72 years ago

Passengers
- 2023–2024: 17,705
- Rank: 41 of 70

Services
Preceding station	Toronto Transit Commission	Following station
College towards Vaughan	Line 1 Yonge–University	Bloor towards Finch
Location

Wellesley is a subway station on Line 1 Yonge–University in Toronto, Ontario, Canada. It is located on Wellesley Street East, east of Yonge Street.

== History ==
Wellesley station opened in 1954 as part of the original stretch of the Yonge line from Union to Eglinton stations, and was listed as a heritage property by the City of Toronto in 1984. The address given for this listing of 16 Wellesley Street East/15 Dundonald Street, which differs from the Toronto Transit Commission (TTC) address, more accurately describes the location of the station structure which runs between those streets, to the rear of the properties fronting on the east side of Yonge Street.

On February 6, 2006, the only baby to be born on the subway, Mary Kim of Scarborough, was delivered on the Wellesley platform. Her mother Sun Hee Paik took the subway with her family to St. Michael's Hospital from their Scarborough home. She did not make it to the downtown hospital, going into labour on the train. Her husband delivered the baby after they disembarked at Wellesley and Toronto EMS arrived later to help finish the birth and send the mother and child to St. Michael's. TTC officials later promised to provide Mary with lifetime transit access.

Construction began in early 2018 to make the station fully accessible, including the addition of two elevators and accessible fare gates. On July 22, 2020, the station became accessible with the completion of the elevator construction. As part of the enhancements for accessibility, provision was made for the future installation of an artwork on the curved wall opposite the two new elevators.

=== Second exit ===
Wellesley was the last downtown TTC subway station with only one street entrance. Plans for a second exit to be located on Wellesley street were tendered in 2011. Construction work for the portion internal to the station began in the fourth quarter of 2014. The projected completion date was initially the second quarter of 2017 but the work was not completed for years after. The mezzanine level leads to two separate exits on Dundonald Street, at 17 Dundonald and at the residential entrance of 597-599 Yonge Street. The TTC claimed that it has completed all work within its control by mid-2017, and that the opening had been delayed by the construction of two condominium buildings. However, despite residents having moved into 17 Dundonald in the second quarter of 2018, the station entrance in the building was not opened until July 27, 2020. Residents of 599 Yonge Street began to take residency in late 2022. As of January 2025, the entrance in that building remains closed.

== Station description ==
This station is located on the north side of Wellesley Street East east of Yonge Street. It is built on two levels, with the main Wellesley Street entrance and bus platform at street level and the subway platforms located on the lower level. There are elevators from street level to the two platforms. A Gateway Newstands can be found in the station. There is a second automatic entrance on Dundonald Street.

== Subway infrastructure in the vicinity ==
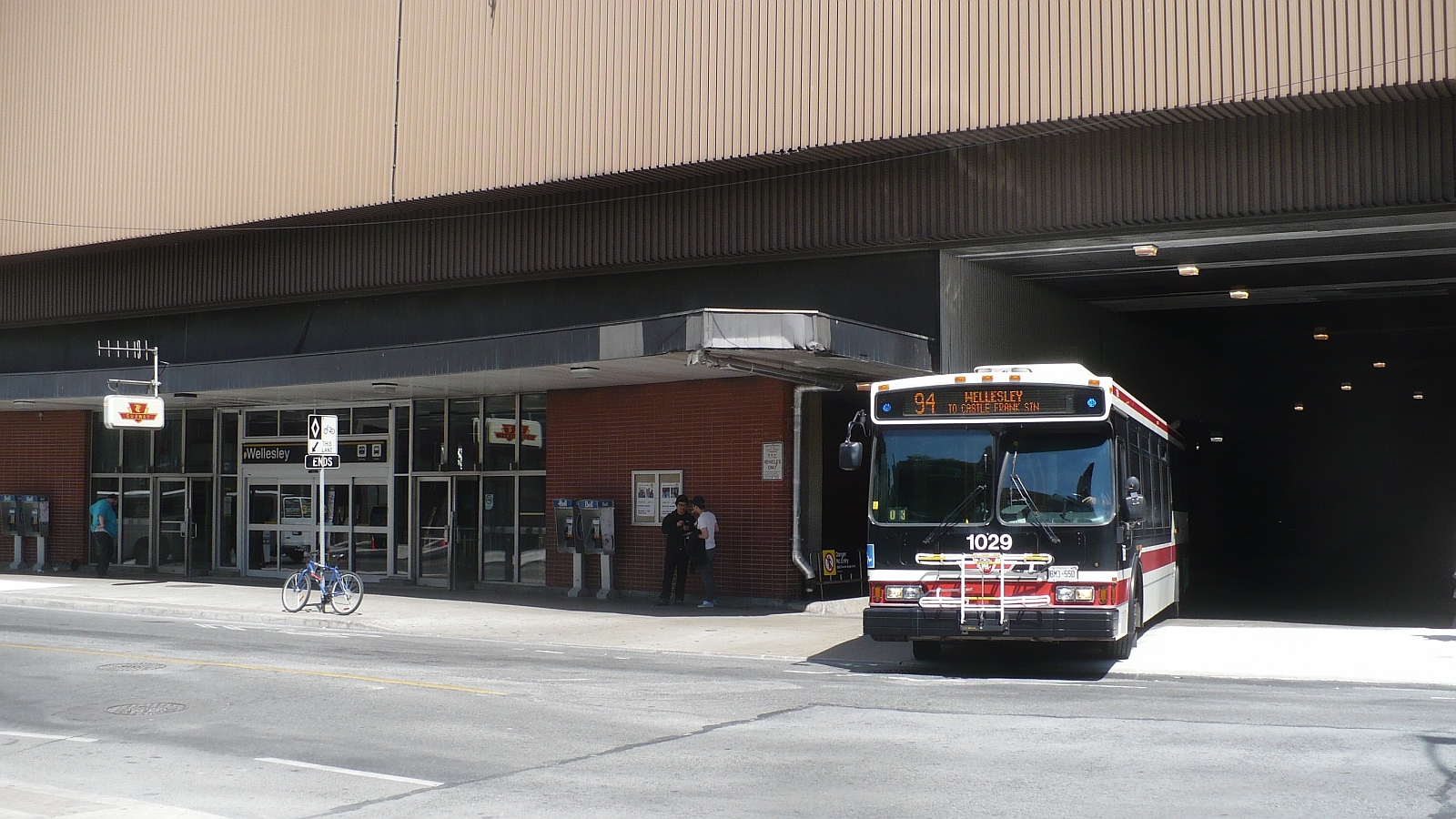
Station entrance

North of the station the tunnel was constructed by cut and cover into Bloor station, where it crosses over Yonge station on Line 2 Bloor–Danforth. South of the station, the tunnel is mostly of a similar construction towards College station. The strip of land occupied by this section of the subway is distinguished by being used mainly for public parks or parking lots.

== Surface connections ==
- 94A Wellesley westbound to Ossington station and eastbound to Castle Frank station
- 94B Wellesley eastbound to Castle Frank station

Bus routes below can be boarded at a curbside stop with a valid transfer.

- 97C Yonge northbound to Eglinton station and southbound to Union station (rush hour service)
- 320 Yonge Blue Night northbound to Steeles Avenue and southbound to Queens Quay
