= List of Toronto Transit Commission bus routes =

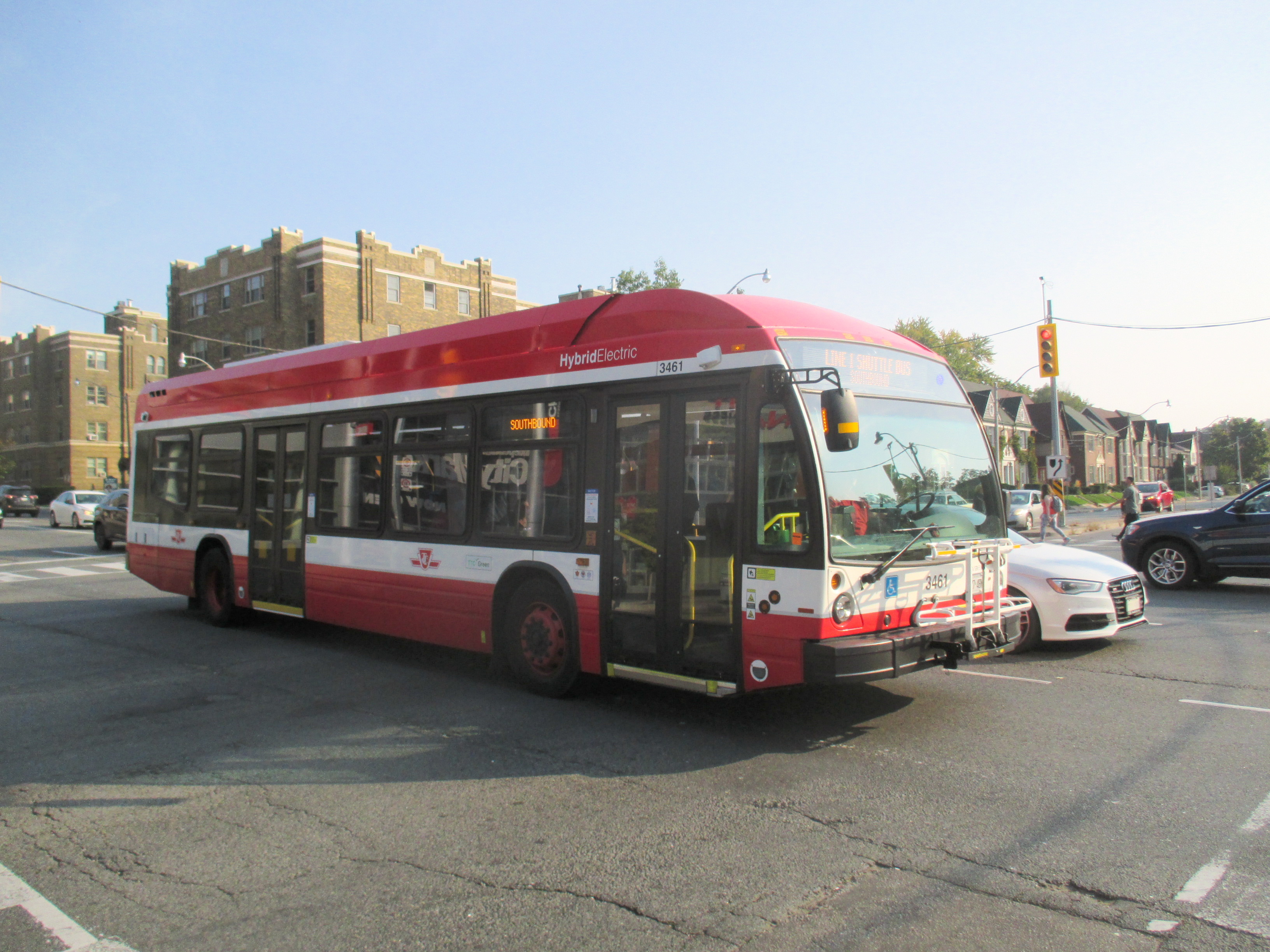
Nova Bus LFS hybrid 3461 on Yonge Street at Lawrence Avenue on the Line 1 Shuttle in 2020

Toronto's public transit operator, the Toronto Transit Commission (TTC), operates Canada's most extensive bus system. As of 2026, the TTC operates 177 day and 30 night bus routes.

These changes are current as of November 1, 2026.

== Route types ==
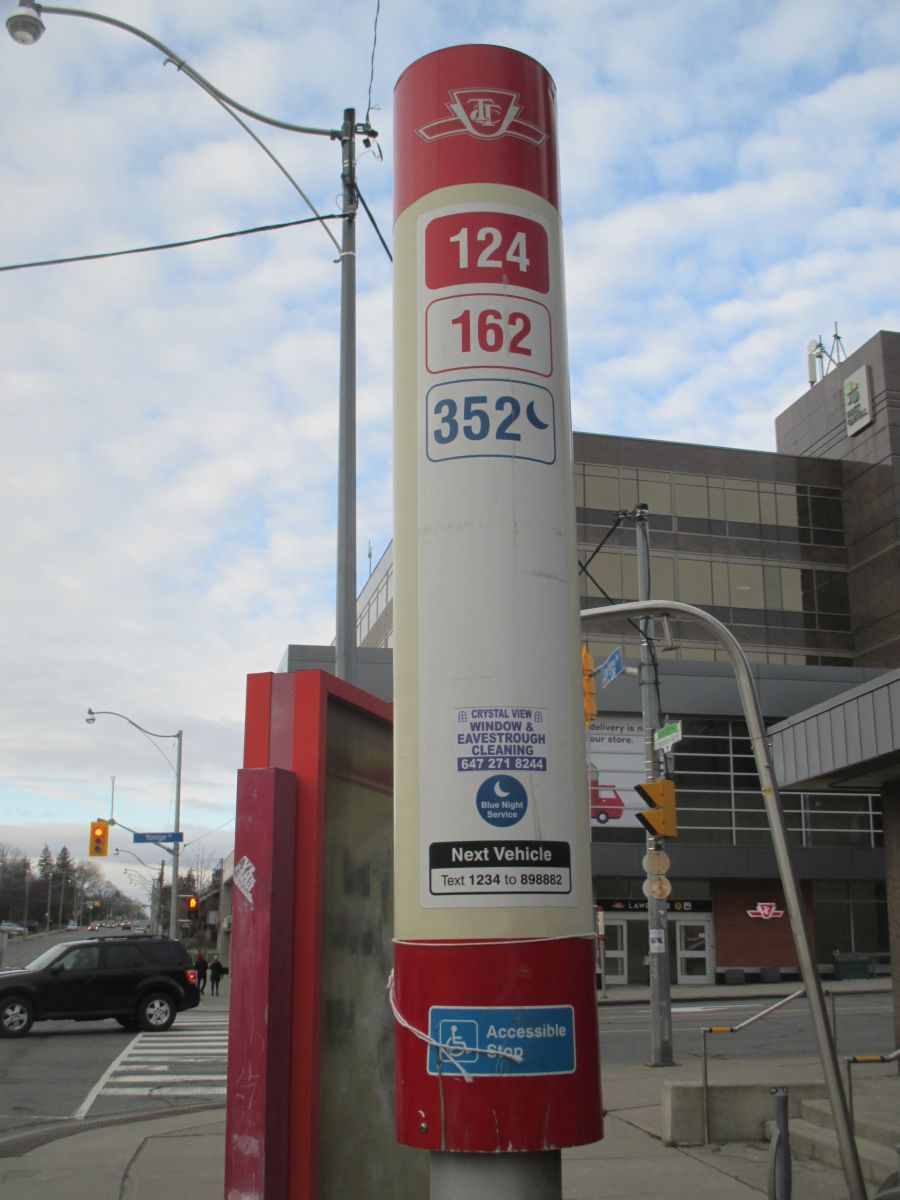
Routes displayed on TTC bus stop pole in front of Lawrence station; routes colour-coded by type: 124 regular service, 162 limited service, 352 Blue Night Network; the stop is an accessible stop

The Toronto Transit Commission operates six types of bus routes:

- Regular service routes: Routes have at least one branch or a section of overlapping branches that operates from 6 am (8 am on Sundays) to 1 am the next calendar day, 7 days per week. Some routes are part of the 10-minute network having one or more branches operating at a 10-minute frequency (or better) throughout the day and evening. Otherwise, service frequency varies by route and time of day.
- Limited service routes: Routes do not serve all hours of the day, or not all days of the week. The frequency of service varies by route. Regular service and limited service routes are collectively numbered between 7 and 191.
- Seasonal routes (200-series): Routes operating during the warmer months serving and named after a city attraction such as Toronto Zoo, Bluffer's Park, Cherry Beach, and High Park.
- Blue Night Network routes (300-series): Routes operate from 1 am to 6 am (8 am on Sundays), which are also the times that the Toronto subway system does not operate. Service frequency is 30 minutes or better depending on route.
- Community bus routes (400-series): Routes operate Monday to Friday between the morning and afternoon peak periods, and connect geriatric residences and geriatric care facilities with local amenities within a community. Unlike for other routes, community bus routes use minibuses, and passengers may flag down the bus anywhere along route.
- Express network routes (900-series): Routes serve select stops only. The service frequency varies by route, and some routes do not operate during all periods. However, two express routes (900 Airport Express and 927 Highway 27 Express) are also part of the 10-minute network.

The TTC operates several bus routes that run from Toronto into a neighbouring municipality. Outside of Toronto, these routes operate on behalf of either MiWay (Mississauga) or York Region Transit, and require a TTC fare within Toronto and either a Miway or a YRT fare beyond the Toronto city limits. With Ontario's One Fare program, only one fare is required for such routes provided that the rider pays the fare by credit, debit or Presto card and completes the trip within two hours or within three hours if the trip involves the use of GO Transit's services.

All routes have wheelchair-accessible low-floor buses. Except for community routes, all buses are equipped with bicycle racks that can hold one or two bicycles. The Nova units can only carry one while Orion and New Flyer units can carry two.

== Routes ==
Regular service (0–199 series)
Limited service (0–199 series)
Seasonal service (200 series)
Blue Night Network (300 series)
Community bus (400 series)
Special Service (800 series)
Express Network (900 series)

Route		Destinations				Division	Notes
7	Bathurst (10-minute network)	NB	To Steeles Avenue West	SB	To Bathurst station	Wilson	Articulated service common
8	Broadview	NB	To Warden station via O'Connor Drive	SB	To Broadview station via O'Connor Drive	Birchmount	
9	Bellamy	NB	To Scarborough Centre station	SB	To Warden station	Birchmount	
10	Van Horne	EB	To Victoria Park Avenue	WB	To Don Mills station	McNicoll	Service operates during rush hour; fills in for 169A Huntingwood
11A	Bayview	NB	To Steeles Avenue East via Sunnybrook Health Sciences Centre	SB	To Davisville station via Sunnybrook Health Sciences Centre	Eglinton	
11B	Bayview	NB	To Lawrence Station via Sunnybrook Health Sciences Centre	SB	To Davisville station via Sunnybrook Health Sciences Centre	Eglinton	
12A	Kingston Road	EB	To Kennedy station via Variety Village and Brimley Road	WB	To Victoria Park station via Brimley Road and Variety Village	Birchmount	Service operates daytime and early evening on weekdays and daytime on weekends
12B	Kingston Road	EB	To Kennedy station via Brimley Road	WB	To Victoria Park station via Brimley Road	Birchmount	Service operates late evenings daily and all day on weekends
12D	Kingston Road	EB	To U of T Scarborough	WB	To Victoria Park station	Birchmount	Service operates on weekdays during the daytime and early evenings
13A	Avenue Road	NB	To Eglinton station	SB	To Queen's Park	Wilson	Temporary regular service for accessibility at Museum station
13B	Avenue Road	NB	To Eglinton station	SB	To Gerrard Street	Wilson	Weekday midday service
14	Glencairn	EB	To Davisville station	WB	To Caledonia Road	Mount Dennis	
15	Evans	EB	To Royal York station	WB	To Sherway Gardens	Queensway	
16	McCowan	NB	To Scarborough Centre station	SB	To Warden station	Birchmount	
17A	Birchmount	NB	To Highway 7	SB	To Warden station	McNicoll	YRT fare required north of Steeles; Rush hour service
17B	Birchmount	NB	To Steeles Avenue East via Wintermute Boulevard	SB	To Warden station	McNicoll	Rush hour service
17C	Birchmount	NB	To Steeles Avenue East and Warden Avenue	SB	To Warden station	McNicoll	Service does not operate during rush hour on weekdays
18A	Caledonia	NB	To Yorkdale station via Bridgeland Avenue	SB	To Caledonia station via Bridgeland Avenue	Wilson	
18B	Caledonia	NB	To Yorkdale station via Orfus Road	SB	To Caledonia station via Orfus Road	Wilson	Rush hour service
19	Bay	NB	To Dupont Street	SB	To Union station	Birchmount	
20	Cliffside	EB	To Kennedy station	WB	To Main Street station	Birchmount	
21C	Brimley	NB	To Steeles Avenue East via Scarborough Centre station	SB	To Kennedy station via Scarborough Centre station	Birchmount	
22	Coxwell (10-minute network)	NB	To Coxwell station	SB	To Queen Street East	Birchmount	
23	Dawes	NB	To St. Clair Avenue East	SB	To Main Street station	Birchmount	
24A	Victoria Park (10-minute network)	NB	To Steeles Avenue East	SB	To Victoria Park station	Birchmount	
24B	Victoria Park (10-minute network)	NB	To Don Mills station via Consumers Road	SB	To Victoria Park station via Consumers Road	Birchmount	Weekday rush hour and midday service
25A	Don Mills (10-minute network)	NB	To Steeles Avenue East via Don Valley station and Don Mills station	SB	To Broadview station via Don Mills station and Don Valley station	Eglinton	Temporary diversion southbound to Broadview station (Note: On May 12, 2024, the bus terminal at Pape station closed for Ontario Line construction, which led to several long-term bus route diversions. Bus routes 25 and 925 were diverted to terminate at Broadview station instead of Pape station. To accommodate this diversion, routes 8 and 62 were extended to run farther south from Broadview station to terminate at Hennick Bridgepoint Hospital. Bus route 72 was extended northbound from Pape station to Thorncliffe Park, temporarily replacing the 81 route.); Service operates during the late evenings on weekdays and all day on weekends
25B	Don Mills (10-minute network)	NB	To Don Mills station via Don Valley station	SB	To Broadview station via Don Valley station	Eglinton	Service operates on weekdays until the late evening; Has a school tripper departure from George S. Henry Academy on Fenelon Loop. Southbound only
25C	Don Mills (10-minute network)	NB	To Steeles Avenue East	SB	To Don Mills station	Eglinton	Service operates on weekdays until the late evening
26	Dupont	EB	To St. George station	WB	To Jane station	Queensway	
27	Jane South (10-minute network)	NB	To Mount Dennis station	SB	To Jane station	Mount Dennis	
28	Bayview South	EB	To Evergreen Brick Works	WB	To Davisville station	Mount Dennis	
29	Dufferin (10-minute network)	NB	To Wilson station	SB	To Exhibition Place (Dufferin Gate)	Mount Dennis	Articulated service on this branch
29C	Dufferin (10-minute network)	NB	To Wilson station	SB	To Exhibition Place (Princes' Gates)	Mount Dennis	Articulated service on this branch
30	High Park North	EB	To High Park station	WB	To Runnymede Road	Queensway	
31	Greenwood	NB	To Greenwood Station	SB	To Queen Street East and Eastern Avenue	Birchmount	
32	Eglinton West (10-minute network)	EB	To Mount Dennis station	WB	To Renforth station	Mount Dennis	
33	Forest Hill	EB	To Forest Hill station	WB	To St. Clair West station	Wilson	
34	Eglinton	EB	To Kennedy station	WB	To Mount Dennis station	Eglinton	
35A	Jane (10-minute network)	NB	To Pioneer Village station	SB	To Mount Dennis station	Mount Dennis	
35B	Jane (10-minute network)	NB	To Pioneer Village station via Hullmar Drive	SB	To Mount Dennis station via Hullmar Drive	Mount Dennis	
36	Finch West (10-minute network)	EB	To Finch station	WB	To Finch West station	Arrow Road	
37A	Islington	NB	To Humber College station via Rexdale Boulevard and Woodbine Racetrack	SB	To Islington station via Woodbine Racetrack and Rexdale Boulevard	Queensway	Has a school tripper departure from Richview Collegiate Institute (1738 Islington Avenue) to Islington station. Southbound only.
37B	Islington	NB	To Steeles Avenue West	SB	To Islington station	Queensway	
38A	Highland Creek	EB	To Rouge Hill GO Station via Scarborough Centre station	WB	To Kennedy station via Scarborough Centre station	Malvern	
38B	Highland Creek	EB	To U of T Scarborough via Scarborough Centre station	WB	To Kennedy station via Scarborough Centre station	Malvern	Weekday service; Runs westbound in the morning, eastbound in the afternoon during rush hour service; Service does not operate in the spring and summer
39A	Finch East (10-minute network)	EB	To Neilson Road	WB	To Finch station	McNicoll	
39B	Finch East (10-minute network)	EB	To Old Finch Avenue and Morningview Trail	WB	To Finch station	McNicoll	
39C	Finch East (10-minute network)	EB	To Victoria Park Avenue and Gordon Baker Road	WB	To Finch station	McNicoll	Rush hour service
40A	Junction–Dundas West	EB	To Dundas West station	WB	To Kipling station	Queensway	
40B	Junction–Dundas West	EB	To Dundas West station	WB	To Jane Street and St. Clair Avenue West	Queensway	
41	Keele	NB	To Pioneer Village station via Keelesdale station	SB	To Keele station via Keelesdale station	Mount Dennis	
42	Cummer	EB	To Middlefield Road (Dynamic Drive)	WB	To Finch station	McNicoll	
43A	Kennedy (10-minute network)	NB	To Steeles Avenue East	SB	To Kennedy station	McNicoll	
43B	Kennedy (10-minute network)	NB	To Scarborough Centre station via Progress Avenue	SB	To Kennedy station	McNicoll	Service operates during the day and early evenings 7 days a week
44	Kipling South (10-minute network)	NB	To Kipling station	SB	To Lake Shore Boulevard	Queensway	
45A	Kipling (10-minute network)	NB	To Steeles Avenue West	SB	To Kipling station	Mount Dennis	
46	Martin Grove	NB	To Steeles Avenue West	SB	To Kipling station	Queensway	Has a school tripper route, labelled 46E from Martingrove Collegiate Institute to Kipling station with limited stops. Southbound only.
47	Lansdowne (10-minute network)	NB	To Caledonia station	SB	To Queen Street West	Wilson	
48	Rathburn	EB	To Royal York station	WB	To Mill Road	Queensway	Has a school tripper departure that operates from Silverthorn Collegiate Institute to Royal York station
48A	Rathburn	EB	To Royal York station	WB	To Renforth Drive and Eringate Drive	Queensway	School tripper route, operates from Michael Power - St. Joseph High School to Royal York station.
49	Bloor West	EB	To Kipling station	WB	To Markland Wood	Queensway	
50	Burnhamthorpe	EB	To Islington station	WB	To Mill Road	Queensway	Has a school tripper departure that operates from Silverthorn Collegiate Institute to Islington station. Eastbound only.
51A	Leslie	NB	To Leslie station via Laird station	SB	To Donlands station via Laird station	Eglinton	
51B	Leslie	NB	To Don Mills Road via Laird station	SB	To Donlands station via Laird station	Eglinton	
52A	Lawrence West (10-minute network)	EB	To Lawrence station via Lawrence West station	WB	To Pearson Airport via Lawrence West station and Dixon Road	Arrow Road	
52B	Lawrence West (10-minute network)	EB	To Lawrence station via Lawrence West station	WB	To Westwood Mall via Lawrence West station and Dixon/Airport Roads	Arrow Road	MiWay fare required west of Highway 427. Operates weekdays only.
52D	Lawrence West (10-minute network)	EB	To Lawrence station via Lawrence West station	WB	To McNaughton Drive via Lawrence West station and Dixon/Airport Roads	Arrow Road	MiWay fare required west of Highway 427. Operates weekends and holidays only.
52F	Lawrence West (10-minute network)	EB	To Sunnybrook Health Sciences Centre via Lawrence West station and Lawrence station	WB	To Royal York Road (Braecrest Avenue)	Arrow Road	Service operates during the day on weekdays and Saturdays
52G	Lawrence West (10-minute network)	EB	To Lawrence West station	WB	To Martin Grove Road via The Westway	Arrow Road	
53A	Steeles East (10-minute network)	EB	To Staines Road	WB	To Finch station	McNicoll	Service operates midday and evenings on weekdays and all day on weekends
53B	Steeles East (10-minute network)	EB	To Morningside Avenue	WB	To Finch station	McNicoll	
54A	Lawrence East (10-minute network)	EB	To Starspray Boulevard	WB	To Don Valley station	McNicoll	
54B	Lawrence East (10-minute network)	EB	To Morningside Avenue	WB	To Don Valley station	McNicoll	
55	Warren Park	NB	To Warren Park	SB	To Jane station	Queensway	
57	Midland	NB	To Steeles Avenue East	SB	To Kennedy station	McNicoll	
59A	Maple Leaf	EB	To Lawrence West station via Culford Road / Benton Road	WB	To Weston Road via Benton Road / Culford Road and Gary Drive	Wilson	
59B	Maple Leaf	EB	To Lawrence West station via Culford Road / Benton Road	WB	To Weston Road via Benton Road / Culford Road and Church Street	Wilson	
60A	Steeles West (10-minute network)	EB	To Finch station	WB	To Pioneer Village station	Wilson	
60B	Steeles West (10-minute network)	EB	To Finch station via Pioneer Village station	WB	To Martin Grove Road via Pioneer Village station	Wilson	Service operates in the late evening on weekdays and evenings on weekends
60D	Steeles West (10-minute network)	EB	To Finch station via Pioneer Village station	WB	To Highway 27 via Pioneer Village station	Wilson	Service operates during the early mornings Monday–Saturday
61	Avenue Road North	NB	To Highway 401	SB	To Eglinton station	Wilson	
62	Mortimer	EB	To Main Street station	WB	To Broadview station	Birchmount	
63	Ossington (10-minute network)	NB	To Cedarvale station	SB	To Liberty Village	Wilson	
64	Main	NB	To Main Street station	SB	To Queen Street East	Birchmount	
65	Parliament	NB	To Castle Frank station	SB	To Queen's Quay and Sherbourne Street	Birchmount	
66A	Prince Edward	NB	To Old Mill station	SB	To Humber Loop	Queensway	
66B	Prince Edward	NB	To Old Mill station	SB	To Lake Shore Boulevard	Queensway	
67A	Pharmacy	NB	To Ellesmere Road	SB	To Victoria Park station	Eglinton	
67B	Pharmacy	NB	To Eglinton Avenue East (Rannock Street via Craigton Drive)	SB	To Victoria Park station	Eglinton	AM-only rush hour service
68A	Warden	NB	To Steeles Avenue East	SB	To Warden station	Eglinton	
68B	Warden	NB	To Major Mackenzie Drive	SB	To Warden station	Eglinton	YRT fare required north of Steeles; Service operates during the day and early evening
69	Warden South	NB	To Warden station	SB	To St. Clair Avenue East (Barkdene Hills)	Birchmount	
70	O'Connor	EB	To Eglinton Avenue East	WB	To Coxwell station	Birchmount	
71	Runnymede	NB	To Industry Street (Mount Dennis Bus Garage) via Mount Dennis station	SB	To Runnymede station via Mount Dennis station	Mount Dennis	
72C	Pape (10-minute network)	NB	To Don Valley station via Pape station	SB	To Commissioners Street via Pape station	Birchmount	
73B	Royal York	NB	To Mount Dennis station via La Rose Avenue and Emmett Avenue	SB	To Royal York station via Emmett Avenue and La Rose Avenue	Queensway	Service operates all hours on weekdays and during the daytime and early evenings on weekends
73C	Royal York	NB	To Claireport Crescent via Albion Road	SB	To Royal York station	Queensway	
74	Mount Pleasant	NB	To Eglinton station	SB	To St. Clair station	Eglinton	
75	Sherbourne	NB	To Sherbourne station	SB	To Queens Quay via South Drive	Birchmount	
76A	Royal York South (10-minute network)	NB	To Royal York station	SB	To Lake Shore Boulevard	Queensway	
76B	Royal York South (10-minute network)	NB	To Royal York station	SB	To The Queensway and Grand Avenue	Queensway	Service operates during rush hour and midday on weekdays and daytime on weekends
76C	Royal York South (10-minute network)		To Royal York station		To The Queensway	Queensway	Rush hour service
77	Swansea	NB	To Runnymede station	SB	To The Queensway	Mount Dennis	
78	St. Andrews	EB	To Bayview Avenue	WB	To York Mills station	Wilson	
79A	Scarlett Road	NB	To Lawrence Avenue West and Jane Street via Pritchard Avenue/Foxwell Street	SB	To Runnymede station via Foxwell Street/Pritchard Avenue	Mount Dennis	
79B	Scarlett Road	NB	To Lawrence Avenue West and Jane Street via St. Clair Avenue West	SB	To Runnymede station via St. Clair Avenue West	Mount Dennis	Service operates every day on weekdays, until 10 pm on Saturdays and until 6:30 pm on Sundays
80A	Queensway	EB	To Keele station	WB	To Sherway Gardens	Queensway	
80B	Queensway	EB	To Mimico GO Station	WB	To Sherway Gardens via Marine Parade Drive and Mimico GO Station	Queensway	Rush hour service
82	Rosedale	EB	To Summerhill Avenue	WB	To Rosedale station	Birchmount	
83	Jones	NB	To Donlands station	SB	To Commissioners Street	Birchmount	
84A	Sheppard West (10-minute network)	EB	To Sheppard–Yonge station via Sheppard West station	WB	To Weston Road via Sheppard West station	Arrow Road	
84C	Sheppard West (10-minute network)	EB	To Sheppard–Yonge station via Sheppard West station	WB	To Steeles Avenue West via Sheppard West station and Arrow Road	Arrow Road	Rush hour service
84D	Sheppard West (10-minute network)	EB	To Sheppard–Yonge station via Norfinch Drive, Oakdale Road and Sheppard West station	WB	To Pioneer Village station via Sheppard West station, Oakdale Road and Norfinch Drive	Arrow Road	Rush hour service
85A	Sheppard East (10-minute network)	EB	To Rouge Hill GO Station	WB	To Don Mills station	Malvern	
85B	Sheppard East (10-minute network)	EB	To Meadowvale Loop	WB	To Don Mills station	Malvern	Service operates on weekdays and during the evening on weekends
85C	Sheppard East (10-minute network)	EB	To Toronto Zoo via Meadowvale Road	WB	To Don Mills station	Malvern	Service operates during the daytime on weekends
86A	Scarborough (10-minute network)	EB	To Toronto Zoo	WB	To Kennedy station	Malvern	Service operates only when the Toronto Zoo is open
86B	Scarborough (10-minute network)	EB	To Highland Creek	WB	To Kennedy station	Malvern	Rush hour service
86C	Scarborough (10-minute network)	EB	To Sheppard Avenue East	WB	To Kennedy station	Malvern	Service operates only when the Toronto Zoo is closed
86D	Scarborough (10-minute network)	EB	To Beechgrove Drive via Lawrence Avenue East	WB	To Kennedy station	Malvern	Service operates until 7 pm from Monday–Saturday only
87A	Cosburn (10-minute network)	EB	To Main Street station via East York Acres	WB	To Broadview station via East York Acres	Birchmount	Service operates during the midday and early evenings Monday–Friday, during the daytime and early evenings on Saturday & during the daytime on Sunday
87C	Cosburn (10-minute network)	EB	To Main Street station	WB	To Broadview station	Birchmount	Service operates during rush hour and the late evenings Monday–Friday, during the early morning and late evenings on Saturday & during the evenings on Sunday
88A	South Leaside	EB	To Thorncliffe Park Drive	WB	To St. Clair station	Eglinton	
88B	South Leaside	EB	To Wicksteed Avenue via Laird station	WB	To St. Clair station	Eglinton	
89	Weston (10-minute network)	NB	To Albion Road via Mount Dennis station	SB	To Keele station via Mount Dennis station	Wilson	
90	Vaughan	NB	To Cedarvale station	SB	To St. Clair West station	Wilson	
91	Woodbine	NB	To Lawrence Avenue East	SB	To Woodbine station	Eglinton Malvern	
91C	Woodbine	NB	To York Mills Road	SB	To Woodbine station via Eglinton Avenue East and Sunrise Avenue	Eglinton Malvern	School tripper route, operates to York Mills Road as 91C in the morning and from Milne Valley Middle School in the evening.
92	Woodbine South	NB	To Woodbine station	SB	To Lake Shore Boulevard	Birchmount	
93	Parkview Hills	NB	To Parkview Hills Crescent	SB	To Woodbine station	Birchmount	
94A	Wellesley (10-minute network)	EB	To Castle Frank station via Wellesley station	WB	To Ossington station via Wellesley station	Birchmount	
94B	Wellesley (10-minute network)	EB	To Castle Frank station	WB	To Wellesley station	Birchmount	
95A	York Mills (10-minute network)	EB	To Sheppard Avenue East and Port Union Road	WB	To York Mills station	Malvern	
95B	York Mills (10-minute network)	EB	To U of T Scarborough	WB	To York Mills station	Malvern	Service operates every day during evenings.
96A	Wilson (10-minute network)	EB	To York Mills station via Humber College station, John Garland Boulevard, Kipling Avenue and Wilson station	WB	To Carrier Drive via Wilson station, Kipling Avenue, John Garland Boulevard, and Humber College station	Arrow Road	Service operates at all hours except weekends during the day and early evenings
96B	Wilson (10-minute network)	EB	To York Mills station via Humber College station, Martin Grove Road, Westhumber Boulevard and Wilson station	WB	To Humberline Drive and Albion Road via Wilson station, Humber College station, Westhumber Boulevard and Martin Grove Road	Arrow Road	
96D	Wilson (10-minute network)	EB	To York Mills station via Humber College station, John Garland Boulevard, Kipling Avenue and Wilson station	WB	To Carrier Drive via Wilson station, Humber College station, John Garland Boulevard, and Westmore Drive	Arrow Road	Service operates weekends during the day and early evenings
97A	Yonge	NB	To Steeles Avenue via Finch station	SB	To St. Clair station	Wilson	
97B	Yonge	NB	To Steeles Avenue via Yonge Boulevard and Finch station	SB	To St. Clair station via Yonge Boulevard	Wilson	
97C	Yonge	NB	To Eglinton station	SB	To Union station	Wilson	Temporary regular service for accessibility at Line 1 stations without elevators
98C	Willowdale–Senlac	EB	To Steeles Avenue East via Sheppard–Yonge station	WB	To Peckham Avenue via Sheppard–Yonge station	Wilson	
99	Arrow Road	NB	To Jane Street	SB	To Arrow Road	Arrow Road	Service operates during all off-peak hours.
100A	Flemingdon Park (10-minute network)	NB	To Don Valley station	SB	To Pape station	Eglinton	
100B	Flemingdon Park (10-minute network)	NB	To Don Valley station via Linkwood Lane	SB	To Pape station via Linkwood Lane	Eglinton	Rush hour service
101A	Downsview Park	NB	To Finch West station via Downsview Park station	WB	To Stanley Greene Boulevard via Downsview Park station	Wilson	
101B	Downsview Park	NB	To Finch West station via Downsview Park station	SB	To Wilson station via Downsview Park station and Stanley Greene Boulevard	Wilson	Rush hour service
102A	Markham Rd (10-minute network)	NB	To Centennial College	SB	To Warden station	Malvern	Service operates during the evenings Monday–Friday only
102B	Markham Rd (10-minute network)	NB	To Steeles Avenue East	SB	To Warden station	Malvern	
102C	Markham Rd (10-minute network)	NB	To Steeles Avenue East via Dynamic Drive	SB	To Warden station via Dynamic Drive	Malvern	Rush hour service
102D	Markham Rd (10-minute network)	NB	To Major Mackenzie Drive	SB	To Warden station	Malvern	YRT fare required north of Steeles; Service operates until 11 pm from Monday–Saturday and until 10 pm on Sunday
103	Mount Pleasant North	NB	To Doncliffe Drive	SB	To Eglinton station	Eglinton	
104	Faywood	NB	To Sheppard West station	SB	To Wilson station	Wilson	
105	Dufferin North	NB	To Steeles Avenue West	SB	To Sheppard West station	Wilson	
106	Sentinel	WB	To Pioneer Village station	EB	To Sheppard West station	Wilson	
107	Alness–Chesswood	NB	To Finch West station	SB	To Sheppard West station	Wilson	
108A	Driftwood	EB	To Sheppard West station via Grandravine Drive	WB	To Pioneer Village station via Grandravine Drive	Arrow Road	
108B	Driftwood	EB	To Sheppard West station via Arleta Avenue	WB	To Pioneer Village station via Arleta Avenue	Arrow Road	
109B	Ranee	NB	To Neptune Drive via Marlee Avenue, Lawrence West station and Flemington Road	SB	To Cedarvale station via Flemington Road, Lawrence West station and Marlee Avenue	Wilson	
109C	Ranee	NB	To Neptune Drive via Marlee Avenue, Lawrence West station and Varna Drive	SB	To Cedarvale station via Varna Drive, Lawrence West station and Marlee Avenue	Wilson	
110A	Islington South	NB	To Islington station via Browns Line and Horner Avenue	SB	To Long Branch Loop via Horner Avenue and Browns Line	Queensway	
110B	Islington South	NB	To Islington station via 30th Street and Horner Avenue	SB	To Long Branch Loop via Horner Avenue and 30th Street	Queensway	Rush hour service
110C	Islington South	NB	To Islington station	SB	To Kipling Avenue and Lake Shore Boulevard	Queensway	
111	East Mall	NB	To Eglinton Avenue West	SB	To Kipling station	Queensway	Has a school tripper route, labelled 111E, from Burnhamthorpe Collegiate Institute to Kipling station with no other stops. Southbound only.
112B	West Mall	NB	To Renforth station	SB	To Kipling station	Mount Dennis	Service operates during rush hour and midday Monday–Friday & during the late evenings on weekends
112C	West Mall	NB	To Disco Road via Renforth station	SB	To Kipling station via Renforth station	Mount Dennis	Service operates at all hours Monday–Friday & during the daytime and early evening on weekends
112E	West Mall	NB	N/A	SB	To Kipling station via Eringate Drive and Highway 427	Mount Dennis	School tripper route, operates from Michael Power / St Joseph High School with limited stops. Southbound only.
113	Danforth	EB	To Kennedy station	WB	To Main Street station	Birchmount	
114	Queens Quay East	EB	To Carlaw Avenue via Ookwemin Minising	WB	To Union station	Birchmount	
115	Silver Hills	NB	To Leslie Street	SB	To York Mills station	Wilson	Service operates during daytime & early evenings 7 days a week
116	Morningside (10-minute network)	EB	To Finch Avenue East and Morningside Heights	WB	To Kennedy station	Malvern	
117	Birchmount South	NB	To Warden station	SB	To Victoria Park station	Birchmount	
118	Thistle Down	EB	To Wilson station via Tandridge Crescent	WB	To Thistle Down Boulevard via Tandridge Crescent	Wilson	Buses enter Tandridge Crescent eastbound before 3 pm and westbound after 3 pm
119A	Torbarrie	WB	To Arrow Road via Clayson Road	EB	To Wilson station via Torbarrie Road	Arrow Road	Service operates midday Monday–Friday before 12 pm
119A	Torbarrie	WB	To Arrow Road via Torbarrie Road	EB	To Wilson station via Clayson Road	Arrow Road	Service operates midday Monday–Friday after 12 pm
119B	Torbarrie	WB	To Milvan Drive via Clayson Road and Fenmar Drive	EB	To Wilson station via Torbarrie Road	Arrow Road	AM rush hour service
119B	Torbarrie	WB	To Milvan Drive via Torbarrie Road and Fenmar Drive	EB	To Wilson station via Clayson Road	Arrow Road	PM rush hour service
120	Calvington	NB	To Wilson station	SB	To Sheppard Avenue West and Jane Street	Arrow Road	
121	Esplanade–River	EB	To Hennick Bridgepoint Hospital	WB	To Union station	Birchmount	
122	Graydon Hall	EB	To Roywood Drive via Lesmill Road	WB	To York Mills station	Malvern	
123B	Sherway	NB	To Kipling station via East Mall and Shorncliffe Road	SB	To Long Branch Loop via Shorncliffe Road and East Mall	Queensway	Service operates during the evenings Monday–Friday & at all hours on weekends
123C	Sherway	NB	To Kipling station via North Queen Street and Shorncliffe Road	SB	To Long Branch Loop via Shorncliffe Road and North Queen Street	Queensway	
123D	Sherway	NB	To Kipling station via East Mall and Shorncliffe Road	SB	To Sherway Gardens via Shorncliffe Road and East Mall	Queensway	Service operates on weekdays during the day
123F	Sherway	NB	To Kipling station via West Mall	SB	To Sherway Gardens via West Mall	Queensway	Rush hour service
125	Drewry	EB	To Finch station	WB	To Bathurst Street (Torresdale Avenue)	Wilson	
126	Christie	NB	To St. Clair West station	SB	To Christie station	Wilson	
127	Davenport	EB	To Spadina station	WB	To St. Clair Avenue West and Old Weston Road	Queensway	
129A	McCowan North (10-minute network)	NB	To Major Mackenzie Drive via Scarborough Centre station	SB	To Kennedy station via Scarborough Centre station	McNicoll	YRT fare required north of Steeles; Service operates until 11:20 pm Monday–Friday and until 10:20 pm on weekends
129B	McCowan North (10-minute network)	NB	To Steeles Avenue East via Scarborough Centre station	SB	To Kennedy station via Scarborough Centre station	McNicoll	
130A	Middlefield	NB	To Steeles Avenue East	SB	To Scarborough Centre station	Malvern	
130B	Middlefield	NB	To Steeles Avenue East via Maybrook Drive	SB	To Scarborough Centre station via Maybrook Drive	Malvern	Rush hour service
131	Nugget	EB	To Old Finch Avenue and Morningview Trail via Scarborough Centre station	WB	To Kennedy station via Scarborough Centre station	Malvern	
132	Milner	EB	To McLevin Avenue and Hupfield Trail	WB	To Scarborough Centre station	Malvern	
133	Neilson	NB	To Morningside Heights via Scarborough Centre station and Centenary Hospital (Off-peak only)	SB	To Kennedy station via Centenary Hospital (Off-peak only) and Scarborough Centre station	Malvern	
134B	Progress	NB	To McNicoll Avenue	SB	To Scarborough Centre station	Malvern	Rush hour service
134D	Progress	NB	To Finch Avenue East via Centennial College and Crow Trail	SB	To Scarborough Centre station via Centennial College	Malvern	Service operates during off-peak hours during the week, and all day on weekends except for early mornings on Saturdays
135	Gerrard	EB	To Warden station	WB	To Main Street station	Birchmount	
145	Belfield	NB	To Pearson Airport (Viscount station)	SB	To Kipling station	Mount Dennis	Service operates during rush hour and during the midday on weekdays
149	Etobicoke-Bloor	EB	To Jane station	WB	To Kipling station	Queensway	Temporary route for accessibility at subway stations without elevators
151	Leslie North	NB	To Steeles Avenue East	WB	To Leslie station	McNicoll	
154	Curran Hall	EB	To Conlins Road	WB	To Kennedy station	Eglinton	
156	Millwood	NB	To Wicksteed Avenue via Laird station	SB	To Thorncliffe Park Drive	Eglinton	
158	Trethewey	EB	To Keelesdale station	WB	To Weston Road and Oak Street	Mount Dennis	
160	Bathurst North	NB	To Centre Street	SB	To Wilson station	Wilson	YRT fare required north of Steeles; Service operates until 9:30 pm Monday–Friday and during the daytime on weekends
161	Rogers Road	EB	To Ossington station	WB	To Mount Dennis station	Mount Dennis	
162	Lawrence–Donway	EB	To Don Valley station	WB	To Lawrence station	Eglinton	Service operates during the daytime and early evenings Monday–Saturday & during the daytime on Sunday
164	Castlefield	EB	To Cedarvale station via Keelesdale station	WB	To Mount Dennis station via Keelesdale station	Mount Dennis	
165	Weston Road North (10-minute network)	EB	To York Mills station via Wilson station	WB	To Steeles Avenue West via Wilson station	Arrow Road	
166	Toryork	EB	To Pioneer Village station	WB	To Milvan Drive	Wilson	Rush hour service
167A	Pharmacy North	NB	To Steeles Avenue East via Consumers Road	SB	To Don Mills station via Consumers Road	McNicoll	Service operates midday and evenings on weekdays and daytime and early evenings on Saturdays
167B	Pharmacy North	NB	To Steeles Avenue East	SB	To Don Mills station	McNicoll	Rush hour service
168	Symington	NB	To Mount Dennis station	SB	To Dundas West station	Mount Dennis	
169A	Huntingwood	EB	To Scarborough Centre station via Van Horne Avenue	WB	To Don Mills station via Van Horne Avenue	Malvern	Service operates midday and evenings on weekdays and daytime and early evenings on weekends
169B	Huntingwood	EB	To Scarborough Centre station	WB	To Don Mills station	Malvern	Rush hour service
171A	Mount Dennis	NB	To Industry Street (Mount Dennis Bus Garage) via Mount Dennis station	SB	To Jane Street via Mount Dennis station	Mount Dennis	Service operates all day except the early mornings
171B	Mount Dennis	NB	To Industry Street (Mount Dennis Bus Garage)	SB	To Eglinton Avenue West and Black Creek Drive	Mount Dennis	Service operates in the early morning
184	Ancaster Park	EB	To Wilson station	WB	To de Havilland	Wilson	
185	Sheppard Central	EB	To Don Mills station	WB	To Sheppard–Yonge station	Malvern	
189	Stockyards	EB	To High Park station via Keele station	WB	To Scarlett Road	Queensway	
191	Underhill	NB	To York Mills Road	SB	To Don Valley station	Eglinton	
200	Toronto Zoo	EB	To Rouge Hill GO Station	WB	To Toronto Zoo	Malvern	Service operates daily from 8am to 9pm
201	Bluffer's Park	NB	To Kennedy station	SB	To Bluffer's Park Beach	Eglinton	Service operates from spring until fall; Service operates Monday to Friday between 10am and 10pm and approximately 8am to 10pm on Saturday and Sunday
202	Cherry Beach	EB	To Cherry Beach via Distillery District and Ookwemin Minising	WB	To Union station via Distillery District	Eglinton	Service operates from spring until fall; Service operates Monday to Friday between 9am and 10pm and approximately 9am to midnight on Saturday and Sunday
203	High Park	SB	To High Park via West Road	NB	To High Park station via Colborne Lodge Drive	Queensway	Service operates from March until the fall; Service operates on weekends only
300A	Bloor–Danforth	EB	To Warden Avenue	WB	To Pearson Airport	Arrow Road; Birchmount; Eglinton; Malvern; McNicoll; Mount Dennis; Queensway; Wilson	Service operates from 1 am to 6 am; Articulated service common
300B	Bloor–Danforth	EB	To Kennedy station	WB	To The West Mall	Arrow Road; Birchmount; Eglinton; Malvern; McNicoll; Mount Dennis; Queensway; Wilson	Service operates while the subway is not operating; Articulated service common
307	Bathurst	NB	To Steeles Avenue West	SB	To Exhibition Loop	Wilson	Service operates while the subway is not operating
315	Evans–Brown's Line	EB	To Royal York station	WB	To Long Branch via Sherway Gardens	Queensway	Service operates while the subway is not operating
316	Kingston Road–McCowan	NB	To Steeles Avenue East	WB	To Bingham Loop	Birchmount; McNicoll	Service operates while the subway is not operating
320A	Yonge	NB	To Steeles Avenue East	SB	To Queens Quay	Arrow Road; Birchmount; Eglinton; Malvern; McNicoll; Mount Dennis; Wilson	Service operates while the subway is not operating; Articulated service common
320B	Yonge	NB	To York Mills station		To Queens Quay	Arrow Road; Birchmount; Eglinton; Malvern; McNicoll; Mount Dennis; Wilson	Articulated service common
322	Coxwell	EB	To Bingham Loop via Kingston Road	WB	To Broadview station via Cosburn Avenue	Birchmount	Service operates while the subway is not operating
324	Victoria Park	NB	To Steeles Avenue East via Sheppard Avenue East and Warden Avenue	SB	To Bingham Loop	Birchmount; McNicoll	Service operates while the subway is not operating
325	Don Mills	NB	To Steeles Avenue East	SB	To Commissioners Street	Birchmount; Eglinton	Service operates from approximately 1 am to 5 am
329	Dufferin	NB	To Steeles Avenue West	SB	To Exhibition Place (Princes' Gates)	Mount Dennis; Wilson	Service operates from approximately 1 am to 5 am
334A	Eglinton	EB	To Kennedy station	WB	To Pearson Airport	Eglinton; Malvern; McNicoll; Mount Dennis	Service operates from approximately 1 am to 5 am
334B	Eglinton	EB	To Finch Avenue East and Neilson Road (Finchdene Square) via Morningside Avenue	WB	To Mount Dennis station	Eglinton; Malvern; McNicoll; Mount Dennis	Service operates while the LRT and subway are not operating
335	Jane	NB	To York University	SB	To Jane station	Mount Dennis	Service operates from approximately 1 am to 5 am
336	Finch West	EB	To Yonge Street	WB	To Woodbine Racetrack via Humber College	Arrow Road; McNicoll	Service operates from approximately 1 am to 5 am
337	Islington	NB	To Steeles Avenue West and Kipling Avenue	SB	To Lake Shore Boulevard	Queensway	Service operates while the subway is not operating
339	Finch East	EB	To Markham Road (Finchdene Square)	WB	To Finch station	Arrow Road; McNicoll	Service operates from approximately 1 am to 5 am
340	Junction	EB	To St. Clair Avenue West & Oakwood Avenue	WB	To Dundas West station	Queensway	Service operates from approximately 1:40 am to 5 am
341	Keele	NB	To York University	SB	To Keele station	Mount Dennis	Service operates while the subway is not operating
343	Kennedy	NB	To Steeles Avenue East	SB	To Kennedy station	McNicoll	Service operates from approximately 1 am to 5 am
345	Kipling	NB	To Steeles Avenue West	SB	To Long Branch	Mount Dennis	Service operates while the subway is not operating
352	Lawrence West	EB	To Sunnybrook Hospital	WB	To Pearson Airport	Arrow Road; Wilson	Service operates from approximately 1 am to 5 am
353	Steeles	EB	To Staines Road (Finchdene Square)	WB	To Martin Grove Road	McNicoll	Service operates while the subway is not operating
354	Lawrence East	EB	To Starspray Boulevard	WB	To Yonge Street	McNicoll	Service operates while the subway is not operating
363	Ossington	NB	To Cedarvale station	SB	To Exhibition Loop	Wilson	Service operates from approximately 1 am to 5 am
365	Parliament	NB	To Castle Frank station	SB	To Queen's Quay and Sherbourne Street	Birchmount	Service operates while the subway is not operating
373	Royal York	NB	To Steeles Avenue West and Kipling Avenue	SB	To Royal York station	Queensway	Service operates while the subway is not operating
384	Sheppard West	EB	To Yonge Street	WB	To Steeles Avenue West and Islington Avenue via Weston Road	Arrow Road	Service operates while the subway is not operating
385	Sheppard East	EB	To Rouge Hill GO Station	WB	To Sheppard–Yonge station	Malvern	Service operates from approximately 1 am to 5 am
386	Scarborough	EB	To Sheppard Avenue East	WB	To Kennedy station	Malvern	Service operates from approximately 1 am to 5 am
395	York Mills	EB	To Rouge Hill GO Station	WB	To York Mills station	Malvern	Service operates while the subway is not operating
396	Wilson	EB	To York Mills station	WB	To Martin Grove Road and Steeles Avenue West	Arrow Road	Service operates from approximately 1 am to 5 am
400	Lawrence Manor	EB	To No Frills (270 Wilson Avenue, North York) via Lawrence West station	WB	to Humber River Hospital via Lawrence West station	Lakeshore	
402	Parkdale	NB	To Dufferin Mall via Dufferin station, Lansdowne station, Dundas West station	SB	To Queen Elizabeth Hospital via Dufferin station, Lansdowne station, Dundas West station	Lakeshore	
403	South Don Mills	NB	to Shops at Don Mills via Don Valley station	SB	To East York Town Centre via Don Valley station	Lakeshore	
404	East York	EB	To Kingston Road via Victoria Park station	WB	To Coxwell station via Victoria Park station	Lakeshore	
405	Etobicoke	EB	To West Park Hospital	WB	To Richview Residence for Seniors (Kipling Ave)	Lakeshore	
406	Scarborough-Guildwood	NB	To Scarborough Centre station	SB	To Guildwood GO Station	Lakeshore	
830	Henry Kelsey-Middlefield	NB	To Steeles Avenue East	SB	To Henry Kelsey Senior Public School	Malvern	School trip service reassigned from route 130C; Route doesn't serve a rapid transit stop
900	Airport Express (10-minute network)	NB	To Pearson Airport	SB	To Kipling station	Queensway	Express: Has unique airport-themed livery; Buses 3330–3341 dedicated to 900 service; Route replaced 192 Airport Rocket during the express network implementation
902	Markham Road Express	NB	To Steeles Avenue East via Centennial College	SB	To Warden station via Centennial College	Malvern	Articulated service common
903A	Kennedy–Progress Express	NB	To Centennial College via Scarborough Centre station	SB	To Kennedy station via Scarborough Centre station	Eglinton	Weekday service; Branch replaced the local 134C Progress and 913 Progress Express.
903B	Kennedy–Progress Express	NB	To Scarborough Centre station	SB	To Kennedy station	Eglinton	
904	Don Mills–Scarborough Express	EB	To Kennedy station	WB	To Don Mills station	Malvern	Express; Route replaced 985A Sheppard East Express.
905B	Eglinton East Express	EB	To U of T Scarborough	WB	To Kennedy station	Eglinton	
906	Airport–Humber College Express	NB	To Humberwood Boulevard via Humber College station	SB	To Pearson Airport (Viscount Terminal Link station)	Arrow Road	
924	Victoria Park Express	NB	To Steeles Avenue East	SB	To Victoria Park station	Birchmount	Rush hour express; Route replaced 24E Victoria Park Express during the express network implementation
925	Don Mills Express	NB	To Steeles Avenue East via Don Valley station and Don Mills station	SB	To Broadview station via Don Mills station and Don Valley station	Eglinton	Daytime express; Temporary diversion southbound to Broadview station
927A	Highway 27 Express (10-minute network)	NB	To Humber College station	SB	To Kipling station	Arrow Road	Service only operates during the midday Monday-Friday; Branch replaced 191A Highway 27 Rocket during the express network implementation
927B	Highway 27 Express (10-minute network)	NB	To Steeles Avenue West via Humber College station	SB	To Kipling station via Humber College station	Arrow Road	Service operates during the midday and late evenings on weekdays and all day on weekends; Branch replaced 191B Highway 27 Rocket during the express network implementation
927C	Highway 27 Express (10-minute network)	NB	To Humber College station via Attwell Drive	SB	To Kipling station via Atwell Drive	Arrow Road	Rush hour express; Branch replaced 191C Highway 27 Rocket during the express network implementation
927D	Highway 27 Express (10-minute network)	NB	To Steeles Avenue West and Signal Hill Avenue via Royalcrest Road and Humber College station	SB	To Kipling station via Royalcrest Road and Humber College station	Arrow Road	Rush hour express; Branch replaced 191D Highway 27 Rocket during the express network implementation; Buses run via Royalcrest Road northbound in the AM and southbound in the PM
929	Dufferin Express	NB	To Wilson station	SB	To Exhibition Place (Dufferin Gate)	Mount Dennis	Limited service express; Articulated service on this route
935	Jane Express	NB	To Pioneer Village station	SB	To Jane station	Mount Dennis	Limited service express; Route replaced 195 Jane Rocket, formerly the 35E Jane Express, during the express network implementation
937	Islington Express	NB	To Steeles Avenue West	SB	To Islington station	Queensway	Rush hour express
938	Highland Creek Express	EB	To U of T Scarborough	WB	To Kennedy station	Malvern	Rush hour express; Runs eastbound in the AM, westbound in the PM; Route does not operate during the spring and summer
939A	Finch Express	EB	To Scarborough Centre station	WB	To Finch station	McNicoll	Limited service express; Branch replaced 199A Finch Rocket during the express network implementation; Articulated service on this branch
939B	Finch Express	EB	To Scarborough Centre station via Finch station	WB	To Finch West station via Finch station	McNicoll	Limited service express; Branch replaced 199B Finch Rocket during the express network implementation; Articulated service on this branch
939C	Finch Express	EB	To Morningside Heights	WB	To Finch station	McNicoll	Branch replaced 199C Finch Rocket during the express network implementation; Articulated service on this branch
941	Keele Express	NB	To Finch West station via Keelesdale station	SB	To Keele station via Keelesdale station	Mount Dennis	Rush hour express; Route replaced 41E Keele Express during the express network implementation; New Flyer XDE60 service common; Suspended for the summer
943	Kennedy Express	NB	To Steeles Avenue East	SB	To Kennedy station	McNicoll	Rush hour express
944	Kipling South Express	NB	To Kipling station	SB	To Lake Shore Boulevard	Queensway	Limited service weekday express; Route replaced 188 Kipling South Rocket during the express network implementation; Suspended for the summer
945	Kipling Express	NB	To Steeles Avenue West	SB	To Kipling station	Mount Dennis	Rush hour express; Route replaced 45E Kipling Express during the express network implementation; Suspended for the summer
952	Lawrence West Express	EB	To Lawrence station via Lawrence West station	WB	To Pearson Airport via Lawrence West station and Dixon Road	Arrow Road	Rush hour express
953	Steeles East Express	EB	To Staines Road	WB	To Finch station	McNicoll	Rush hour express; Route replaced 53E Steeles East Express during the express network implementation; Articulated service common
954	Lawrence East Express	EB	To Starspray Boulevard	WB	To Don Valley station	McNicoll	Rush hour express; Route replaced 54E Lawrence East Express during the express network implementation
960B	Steeles West Express	EB	To Finch station via Pioneer Village station	WB	To Martin Grove Road via Pioneer Village station	Wilson	Limited service express; Branch replaced 60E Steeles West Express during the express network implementation
960D	Steeles West Express	EB	To Finch station via Pioneer Village station	WB	To Highway 27 via Pioneer Village station	Wilson	Limited service express; Branch replaced 60E Steeles West Express during the express network implementation
968	Warden Express	NB	To Steeles Avenue East	SB	To Warden station	Eglinton	Rush hour express; Suspended for the summer
984A	Sheppard West Express	EB	To Sheppard–Yonge station via Sheppard West station	WB	To Weston Road via Sheppard West station	Arrow Road	Rush hour express; Branch replaced 84E Sheppard West Express during the express network implementation albeit with an extension westbound from Sheppard West station to Weston Road
985B	Sheppard East Express	EB	To Meadowvale Road	WB	To Don Mills station	Malvern	Limited service weekday express; New branch, partially replacing 190 Scarbrough Centre Rocket while extending service to Meadowvale Road; Articulated service on this branch
986	Scarborough Express	EB	To Sheppard Avenue East	WB	To Kennedy station	Malvern	Rush hour express; Route replaced 86E Scarborough Express during the express network implementation
989	Weston Express	NB	To Steeles Avenue West via Mount Dennis station	SB	To Keele station via Mount Dennis station	Wilson	Rush hour express
995	York Mills Express	EB	To U of T Scarborough	WB	To York Mills station	Malvern	Branch replaced 95E York Mills Express during the express network implementation
996	Wilson Express	EB	To Scarborough Centre station	WB	To Humberwood Boulevard	Arrow Road	Limited service weekday express; Branch replaced 186 Wilson Rocket, formerly the 96E Wilson Express, during the express network implementation

== See also ==
- Toronto Transit Commission bus system
- Toronto streetcar system
