= Lansdowne station (Toronto) =

Toronto subway station

Lansdowne
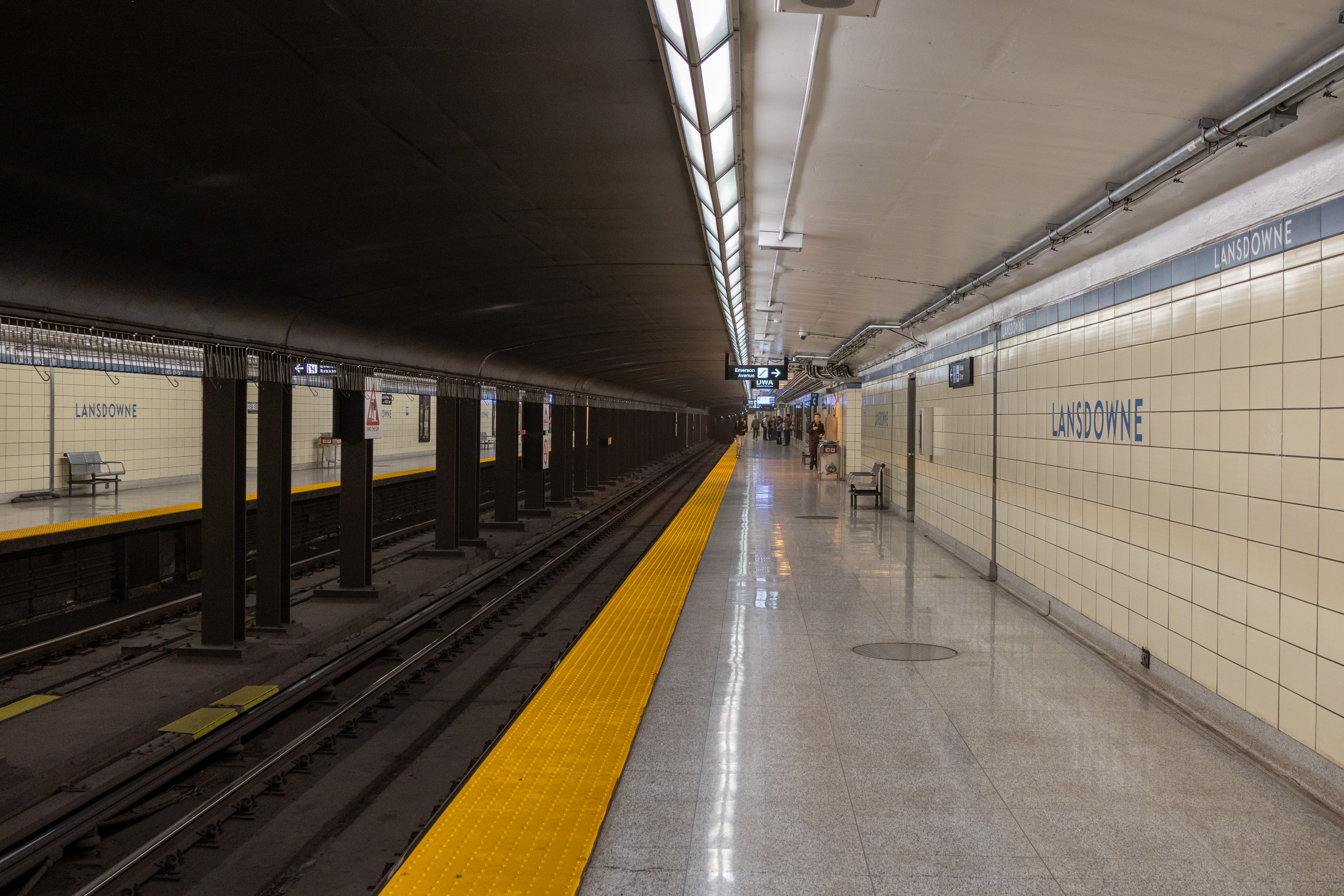

General information
- Location: 691 Lansdowne Avenue, Toronto, Ontario; Canada
- Coordinates: 43°39′33″N 79°26′34″W
- Platforms: Side platforms
- Tracks: 2
- Connections: TTC buses: 47 Lansdowne; 300 Bloor – Danforth; 402 Parkdale Community Bus

Construction
- Structure type: Underground
- Accessible: Yes

Other information
- Website: Official station page

History
- Opened: 26 February 1966; 60 years ago
- Rebuilt: 2019–2022

Passengers
- 2023–2024: 17,406
- Rank: 42 of 70

Services
Preceding station	Toronto Transit Commission	Following station
Dundas West towards Kipling	Line 2 Bloor–Danforth	Dufferin towards Kennedy
Location

Lansdowne is a subway station on Line 2 Bloor–Danforth of the Toronto subway in Toronto, Ontario, Canada. The main station entrance is located just north of Bloor Street on Lansdowne Avenue, with a secondary unstaffed entrance on Emerson Avenue. Opened in 1966, the station lies approximately 561 metres (1,842 feet) from its nearest station to the west, Dundas West. The station is in the Dovercourt-Wallace Emerson-Junction neighbourhood on the edge of the Bloordale Village strip.

Construction started in June 2019 to install three elevators to make Lansdowne station accessible. One elevator was planned to connect the street level to the station concourse. Two other elevators were planned to connect the concourse to the east- and westbound platforms. In December 2022, the project was completed as planned and the station became accessible. As part of the project, the station received public art.

As part of GO Transit's GO Expansion program, a new station on their Barrie line named Junction Triangle is being built 200 metres (660 ft) west of this station and will offer connections between the services.

== Surface connections ==
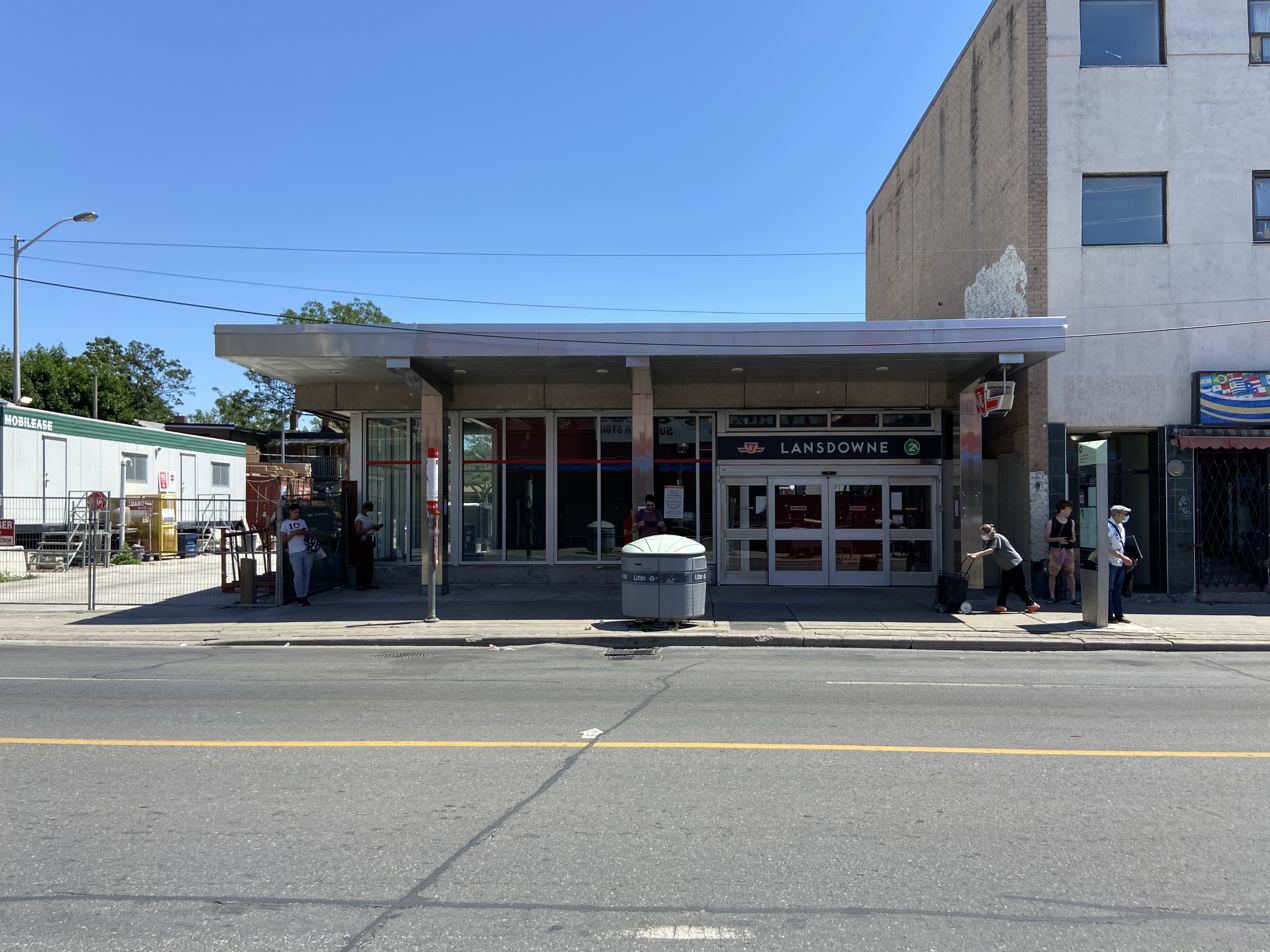
Bus stop outside the entrance on the east side of Lansdowne Avenue

Transfers to buses occur at curbside stops on Lansdowne Avenue at this station.

TTC routes serving the station include:

Route	Name	Additional information
47	Lansdowne	Southbound to Queen Street West and northbound to Caledonia station
