= Benjamin Brown (architect) =

Architect

Benjamin Brown (January 14, 1890 – December 11, 1974) was an architect in Toronto. He was born in what is now Lithuania and arrived in Toronto around 1896 with his family.

== Education ==
Brown attended York Street Public School for a brief time quitting school in 1895 to work in the garment factory to help out his family. In the early 1900s he enrolled in the Ontario School of Art and Design intending to become an artist. When art proved to be a financially unfeasible profession, Brown decided to switch to architecture. Thus, after completing the equivalent of high school, he enrolled in the University of Toronto architectural program graduating in 1913.

== Career ==
Soon after graduation, Brown opened up a practice with fellow architect Arthur W. McConnell, which lasted until the early 1920s. After the partnership ended, Brown set up an independent practice.

Brown was among the first Jewish architects to practice in Toronto during the early 20th century. The discriminatory atmosphere in Toronto in the 1920s was such that it was difficult for Jewish professionals to attract clientele. Thus, Brown's early commissions came primarily from members of the Jewish community. In Toronto's Fashion District, many Jewish clients in the clothing trade commissioned him to design functional loft buildings constructed of reinforced concrete and dressed in a stylish Art Deco cladding of cut stone and brick.

Brown designed and built over 200 projects including single-family residences, apartment buildings, commercial and industrial buildings, as well as synagogues and other community buildings. Many of Brown's buildings were designed in the Art Deco style, with some containing Georgian, Craftsman, Colonial Revival, Tudor and Romanesque elements.

Brown retired in 1955.

== Legacy ==
The Ontario Jewish Archives houses Brown's life's work of over 1500 architectural drawings as a resource for the social history of Toronto's Jewish community as well as the architectural history of the city.

== Buildings ==
Building	Location	Date	Notes	Image
Tower Building	110 Spadina Ave at Adelaide St W, Fashion District, Toronto	1927	Gothic ornamentation. Two-storey penthouse to hide a water tower.	
Balfour Building	119 Spadina Ave at Adelaide St W, Fashion District, Toronto	1929	Art Deco style. Buff brick and carved limestone. Parapet with cubist fan patterns. Five Gothic-inspired, arched openings around the main entrance.	
Reading Building	116 Spadina Ave at Adelaide St W, Fashion District, Toronto	1925	Oculus window over the entrance.	
Commodore Building	317 Adelaide Ave at Peter St, Toronto	1929	Slim penthouse to hide a roof water tank.	
New Textile Building	205 Richmond St W at Duncan St, Toronto	1923	Now belonging to OCAD University.	
Hermant Building	21 Dundas Square, Toronto	1929	Art Deco panels along the roofline.	
Primrose Club	41 Willcocks St, Toronto	1920	Originally a private social space for the elite of the Jewish community; University of Toronto Faculty Club since 1959.	
Beth Jacob Synagogue	23 Henry St, Toronto	1922	A.k.a. Henry Street Shul; today Holy Trinity Russian Orthodox Church. Romanesque style with stained glass windows and retractable roof.	
Mendel Granatstein residence	42 St George St, Toronto	1919	Georgian style. Only the entrance portico exists today, displayed in the University of Toronto's Bahen Centre for Information Technology lobby.	
Benjamin Brown residence	37 Castle Frank Cres, Toronto	1930	Architect's residence from 1931 to 1932.	
Paradise Theatre	1006 Bloor St W, Toronto	1937	643-seat, art deco theatre; restored in 2018.	
2100 Yonge Street	2100 Yonge St	1937	Block of stores with preserved façade	
