= Wilson Yard =

Coordinates: 43°44′21″N 79°27′16″W

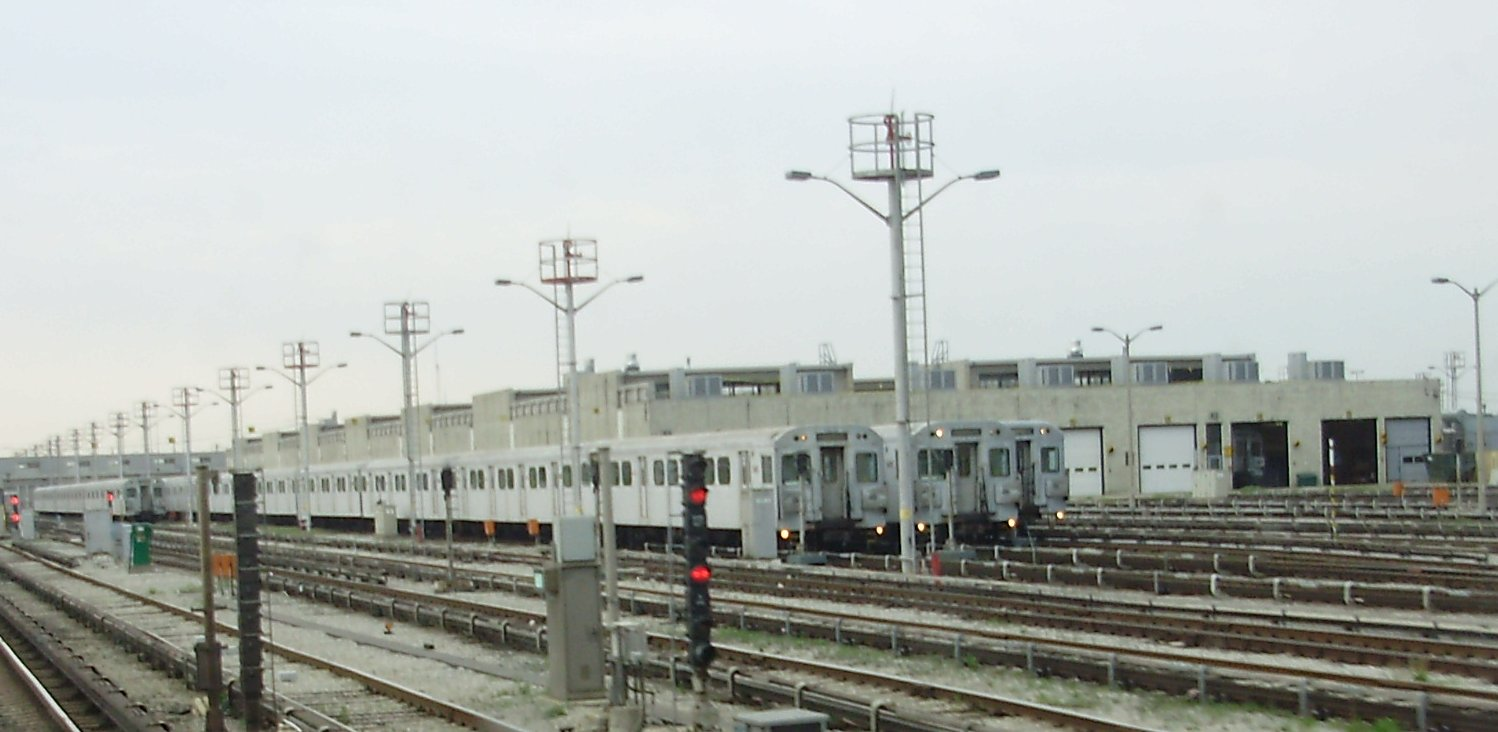
Wilson Complex, viewed from a southbound train

Wilson Yard (Toronto)

Wilson Yard (also known as the Wilson Complex) is the largest of the Toronto Transit Commission's subway yards and bus garages. The subway yard services subway trains on Line 1 Yonge–University. The facility is located on Transit Road north of Wilson Avenue, in the former city of North York (now part of Toronto), between Wilson and Sheppard West stations.

The site is on a large parcel of land that was once part of Downsview Airport, built in 1936. During World War II the airport was turned into a military facility, RCAF Station Downsview, later known as Canadian Forces Base Downsview. The site became available to the TTC around the 1970s, after the federal government sold off part of the base lands as surplus.

In 1974 the TTC considered interim expedients for storage of subway vehicles, until the Wilson Yard became available.

The 60-acre (24 ha) yard was completed in 1976 and began operations in 1977. The facility also houses a bus barn and maintenance facilities for subway cars.

When Downsview (the original name of Sheppard West) station opened in 1996, a northern yard entry track to the extended mainline was constructed to provide better train access to the station, situated north of the yard.

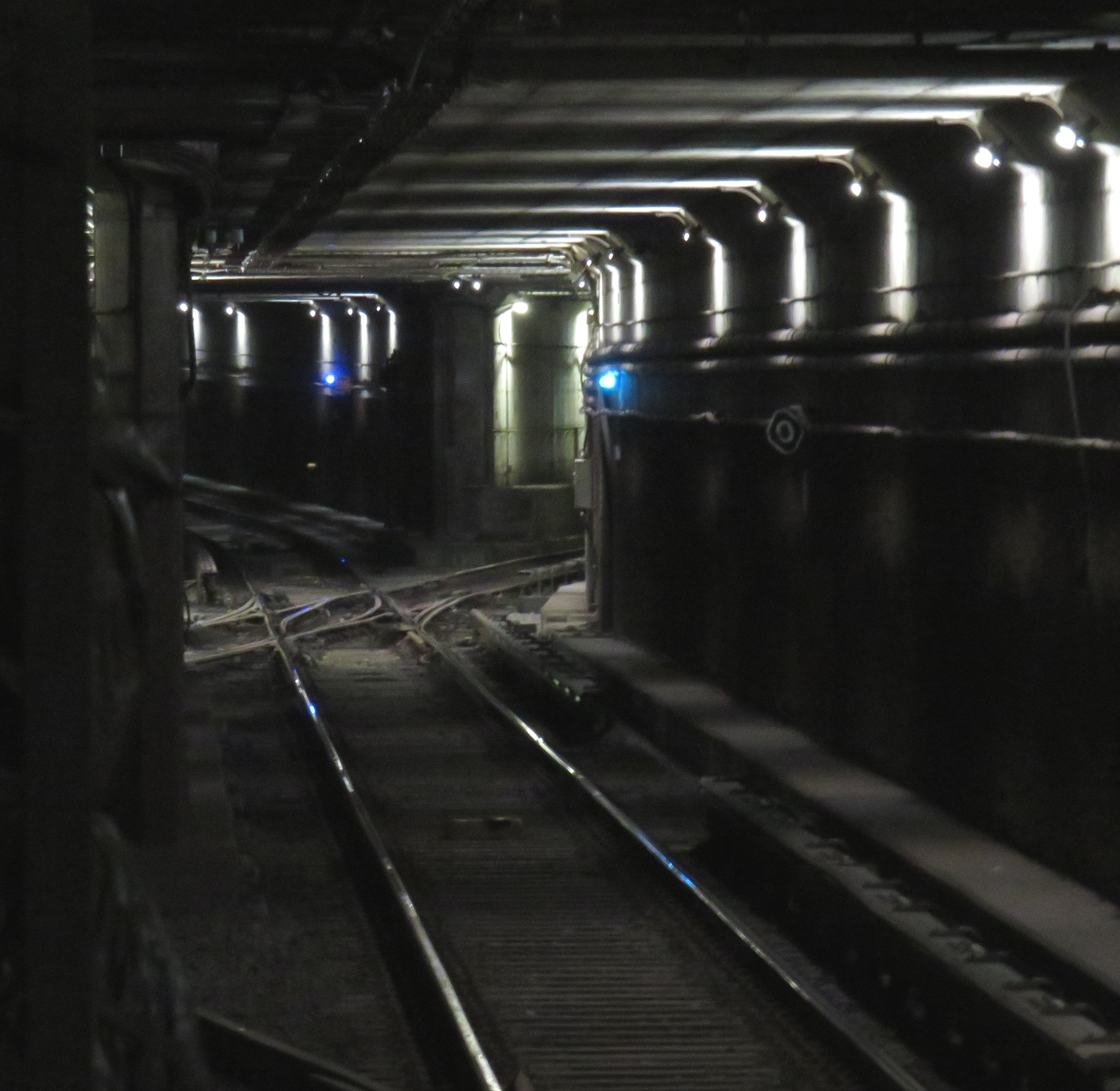
The Wilson Yard connecting tunnel branching to the right off the mainline south of Sheppard West station at the station crossover

By 2010, a tunnel was constructed to provide a link to a proposed northerly expansion of the yard to the mainline just south of Downsview station, though track was not laid and it was left dormant until the yard expansion project was completed in 2018. When it finally opened, this new link provided an entry/exit to the new northern section of the yard for trains servicing the Toronto–York Spadina Subway Extension.

Since May 2018, trains going out of service at the Wilson Yard do so by deadheading southbound from Vaughan Metropolitan Centre station, instead of northbound from Wilson station. This avoids northbound trains going out of service after the evening rush hour having to cross the southbound track, which was the practice prior to this time.

Modifications to the Wilson Yard were made to accommodate the new Toronto Rocket trains, the Toronto–York Spadina Subway Extension and increased demand on Line 1 Yonge–University. Work included expansion of the carhouse, a new hostler platform to support the new north-end entry/exit track, a new north-end runaround track connecting eight new storage tracks in the west yard, a new power substation and a new training building with a simulator for TR trains.

Opened in September 2018, the new hostler platform and north-end entry/exit track helps to reduce traffic delays by 44% in the early morning when work cars return from their night shift and service trains depart.

Automatic train control is being added to all the TTC's heavy rail routes. Automatic Train Control was functional within the 60 acre Wilson Yard in 2019. Spokesmen said robot control of trains, within the yard, would increase safety and decrease delays.

== Subway division facilities ==
- Carhouse with nine interior tracks.
- Exterior storage tracks.
- Power sub-station.
- Connections to the mainline at the north and south ends of the yard.

Wilson Yard is home to approximately half the commission's fleet of trains and work cars. The yard regularly houses most of the Toronto Rocket subway trains. It also houses some disused and outdated equipment.

== Bus division facilities ==
Bus facilities include:

- 21,000 m^{2} (230,000 sq ft) garage
- 11 twelve-metre hoists and 3 eighteen-metre hoists
- 2 wash racks, 2 diesel fuelling stations
- 4 inspection pit stations
- Eurovac system
- bus-only bridge over Transit Road connecting the bus facility to bus platforms at Wilson station
