= Dufferin station =

Toronto subway station

Dufferin
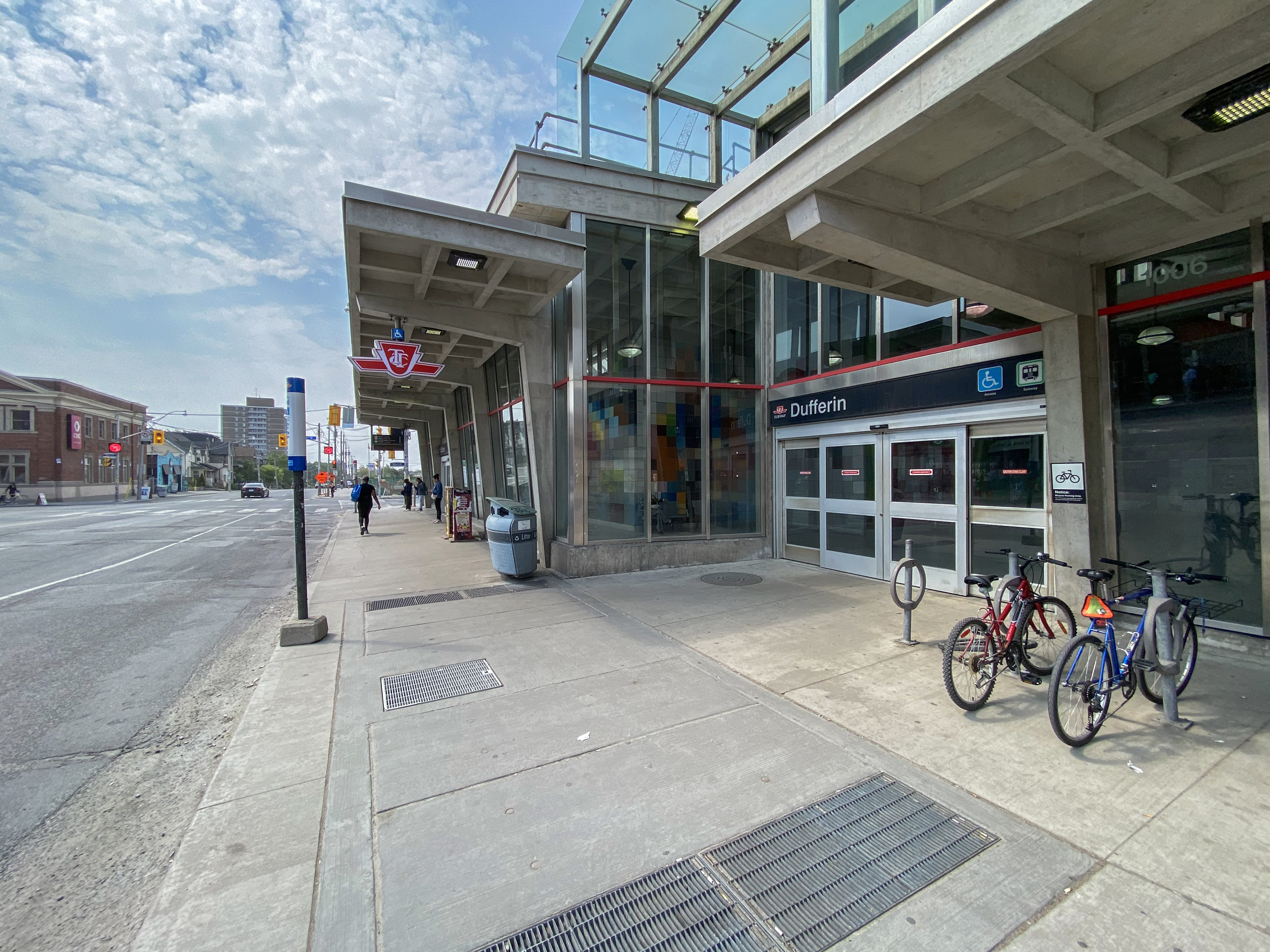
- Southbound entrance and exit

General information
- Location: 1006 Dufferin Street, Toronto, Ontario; Canada
- Coordinates: 43°39′37″N 79°26′07″W
- Platforms: Side platforms
- Tracks: 2
- Connections: TTC buses: 29 Dufferin; 300 Bloor - Danforth; 329 Dufferin; 402 Parkdale Community Bus; 929 Dufferin Express

Construction
- Structure type: Underground
- Accessible: Yes

Other information
- Website: Official station page

History
- Opened: 26 February 1966; 60 years ago
- Rebuilt: 2010–2014

Passengers
- 2023–2024: 26,800
- Rank: 21 of 70

Services
Preceding station	Toronto Transit Commission	Following station
Lansdowne towards Kipling	Line 2 Bloor–Danforth	Ossington towards Kennedy
Location

Dufferin is a subway station on Line 2 Bloor–Danforth of the Toronto subway in Toronto, Ontario, Canada. It is located at Dufferin Street just north of Bloor Street West. It opened in 1966 as part of the original segment of the subway line.

== Architecture and art ==
When the station first opened, the entrance on the west side of Dufferin Street had a tile back wall, a three sided glass and aluminium enclosure entrance at ground level, an opaque flat roof, red signage, and a red accent stripe. In 1974, the Dovercourt Baptist Church constructed the abutting new red brick facility and senior's residence (New Horizons Tower). The entrance on the east side of the street is inset into the westerly facade of the Bloor Dufferin Medical Centre. Inside, smooth, unadorned green-coloured rectangular wall tiles were used, with a strip of narrower black tiles near the ceiling, and terrazzo floor tiles.

The 2010 to 2014 modernization of the station significantly modifies the original west entrance, updating signage, adding an elevator for accessibility, adding ceiling height and additional glazed elements, and adding a canopy covering the sidewalk. A canopy has also been added to the Bloor Dufferin Medical Centre to shelter the east side bus stops, and two additional exits have been added to Russet Ave, one block west of the main entrances. A public art component, titled Something Happens Here by Eduardo Aquino and Karen Shanski of spmb was also added, consisting of colourful mosaics of highly pixelated images of activity from the surrounding communities. The mosaics also include numerous metallic tiles featuring local logos, icons and historical references.

== Nearby landmarks ==
Nearby landmarks include Dufferin Mall, a shopping mall in Toronto, Bloor Collegiate Institute, the Dufferin Grove Park, and the Bloor–Gladstone branch of the Toronto Public Library.

== Surface connections ==
Transfers to buses occur at curbside stops on Dufferin Street outside the station.

TTC routes serving the station include:

Route	Name	Additional information
29A/C	Dufferin	Northbound to Wilson station
29A	Dufferin	Southbound to Exhibition Place (Dufferin Gate)
29C	Dufferin	Southbound to Exhibition Place (Princes' Gate)
929	Dufferin Express	Northbound to Wilson station and southbound to Exhibition Place (Dufferin Gate)
329	Dufferin	Blue Night service; northbound to Steeles Avenue West and southbound to Exhibition Place (Princes' Gate)
402	Parkdale	Community Bus

During the 2026 FIFA World Cup, the TTC introduced additional shuttle and express bus service connecting Dufferin station with Exhibition Place and Dufferin Gate Loop in support of match-day crowds. The 29 Dufferin and 929 Dufferin Express routes operated using dedicated transit lanes along Dufferin Street, while the 829 Dufferin Gate Express provided non-stop shuttle service between Dufferin station and Dufferin Gate Loop on event days.

== Station modernization ==
Dufferin Station was upgraded and modernized under the TTC's Station Modernization program. Work commenced in September 2009 and was fully complete in November 2014, taking over twice the projected time to complete. The "modernization" included the installation of street level elevators for accessibility, the installation of a second entrance from Russett Avenue, two second exits (one on the northwest corner of Russet Avenue and Bloor Street, and the other on the northeast corner, providing direct access from the westbound platform), rebuilding of the bus waiting area, and new and modernized station finishes, art and lighting. The two second exits opened earlier than other improvements, in August 2013.

By January 2024, the TTC and a developer came to an agreement that the developer would construct, maintain and own a new station connection from a new 33-storey, mixed-use development, to be built on the southwest corner of Bloor and Dufferin Streets. The connection will be accessible and underground, and is expected to open in 2026.

== Gallery ==
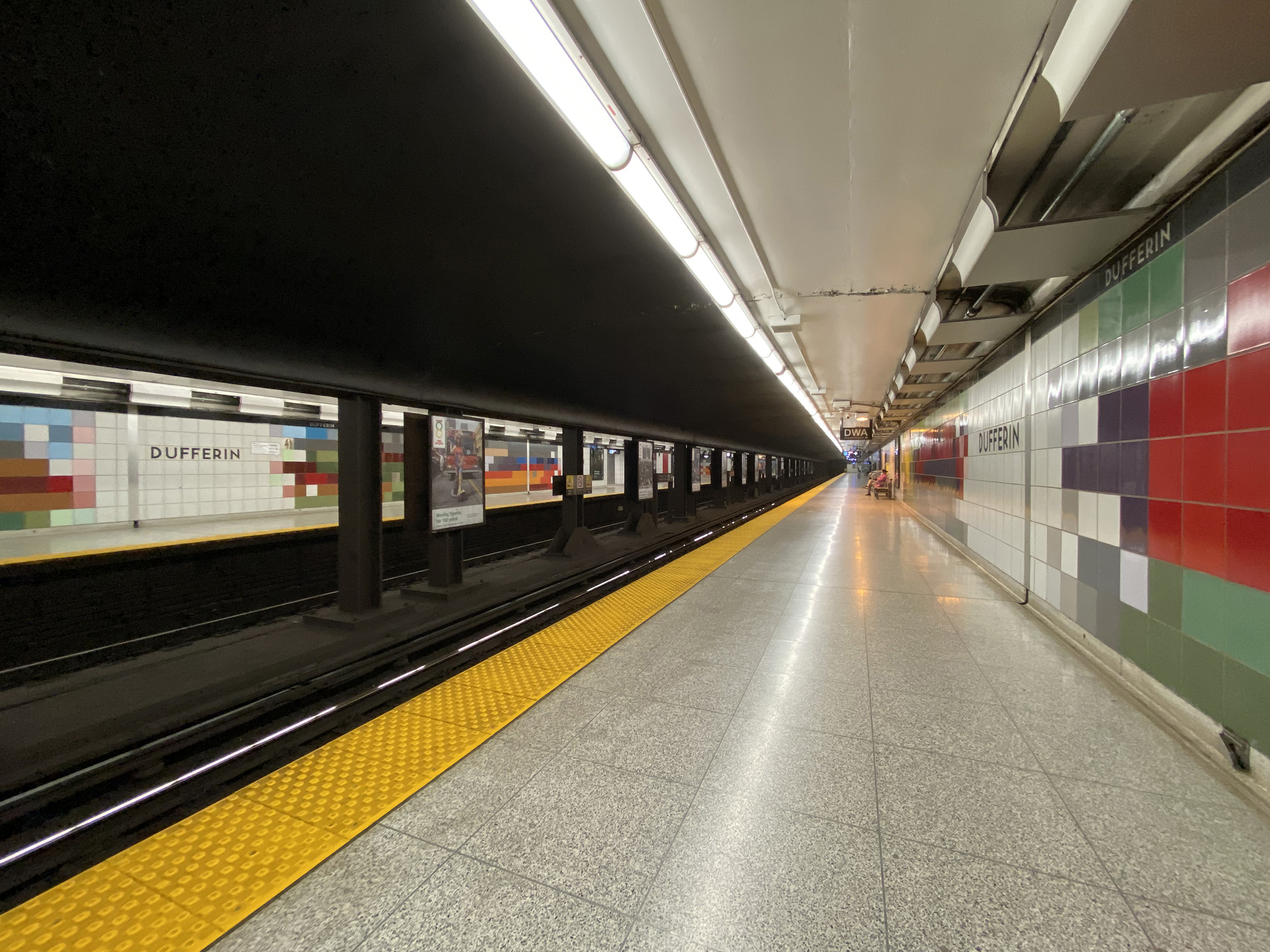
Station platform

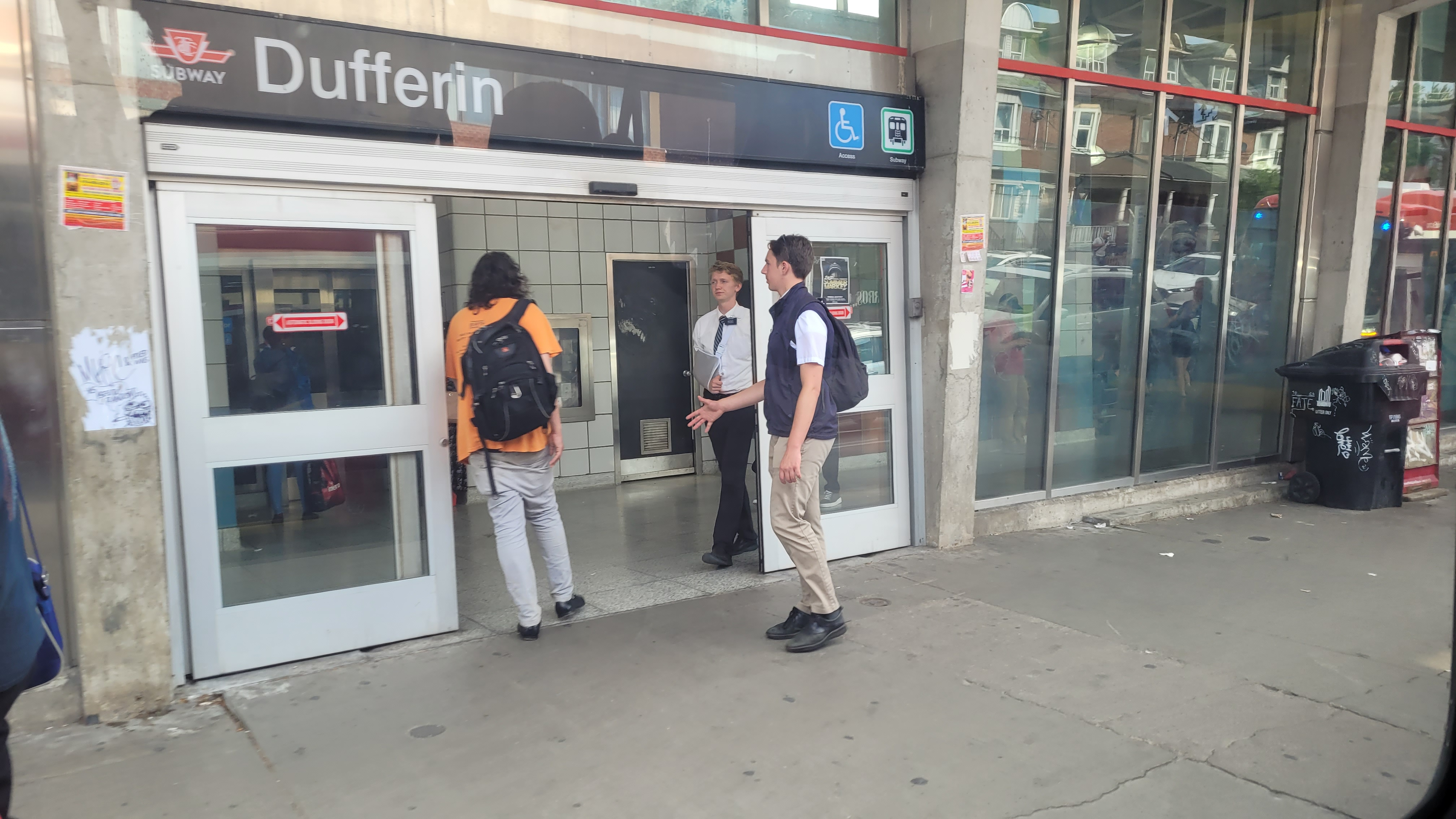
Dufferin station southbound exit in 2024

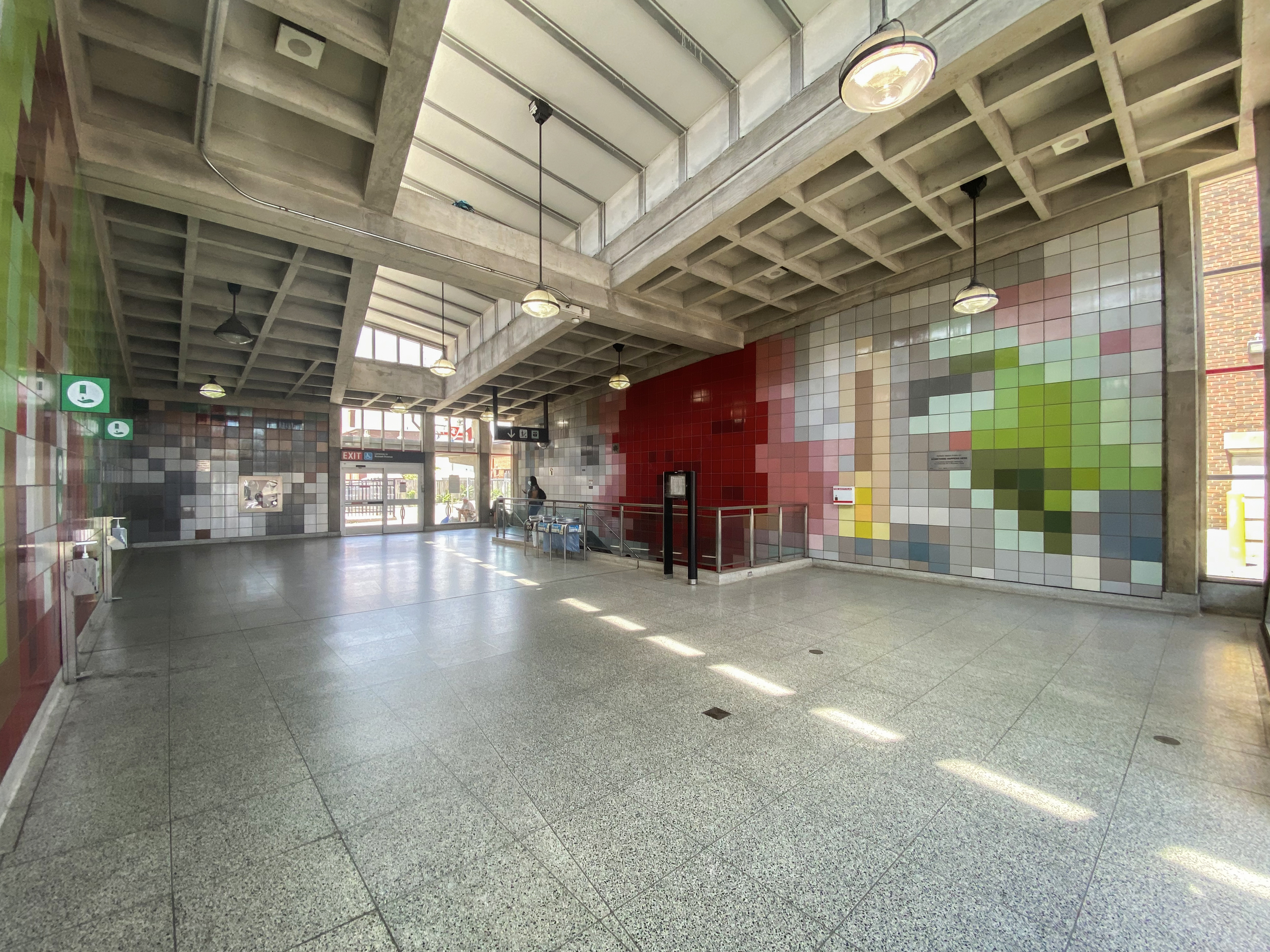
Renovated concourse with multicoloured tile design

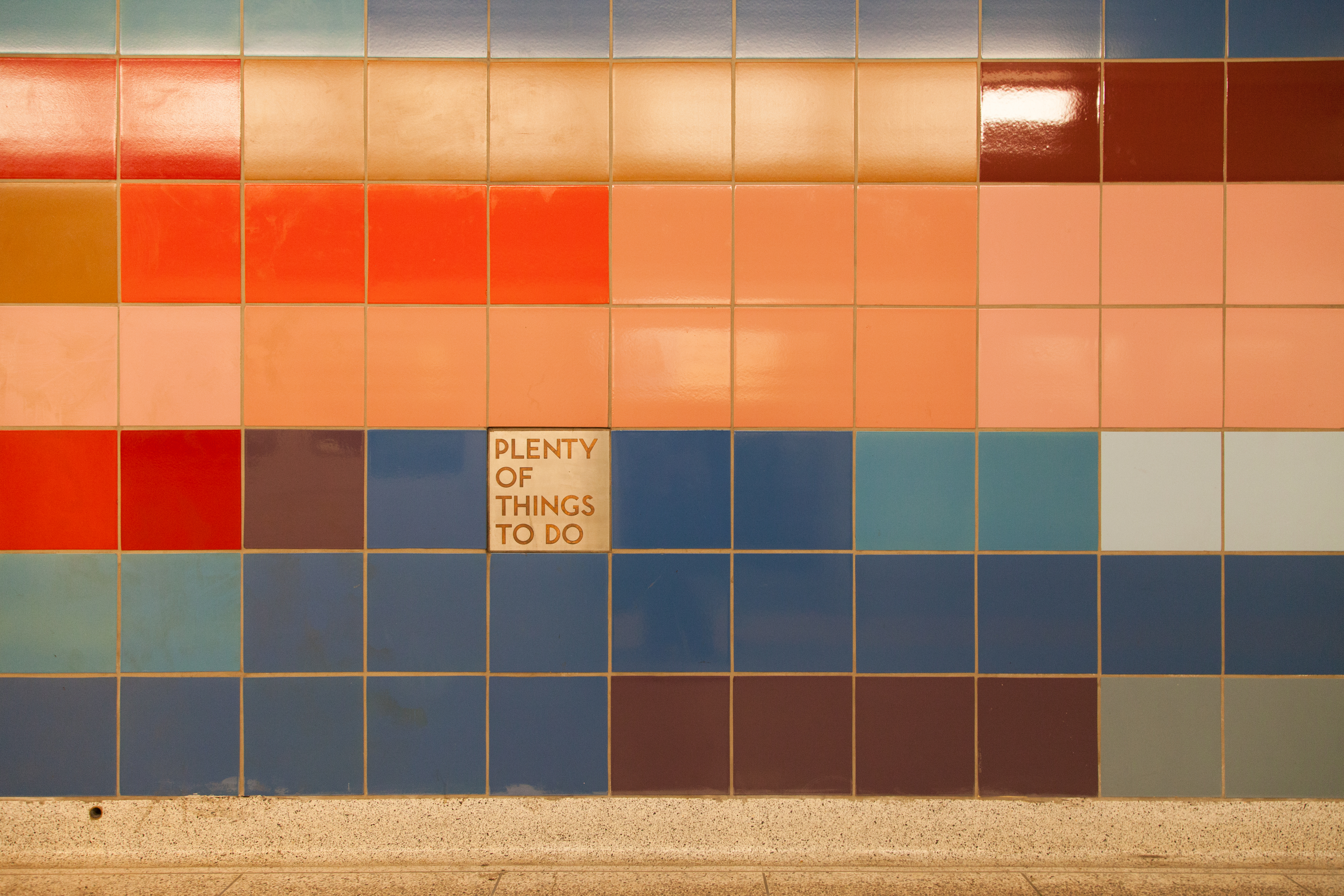
Artwork Something Happens Here by Eduardo Aquino and Karen Shanski

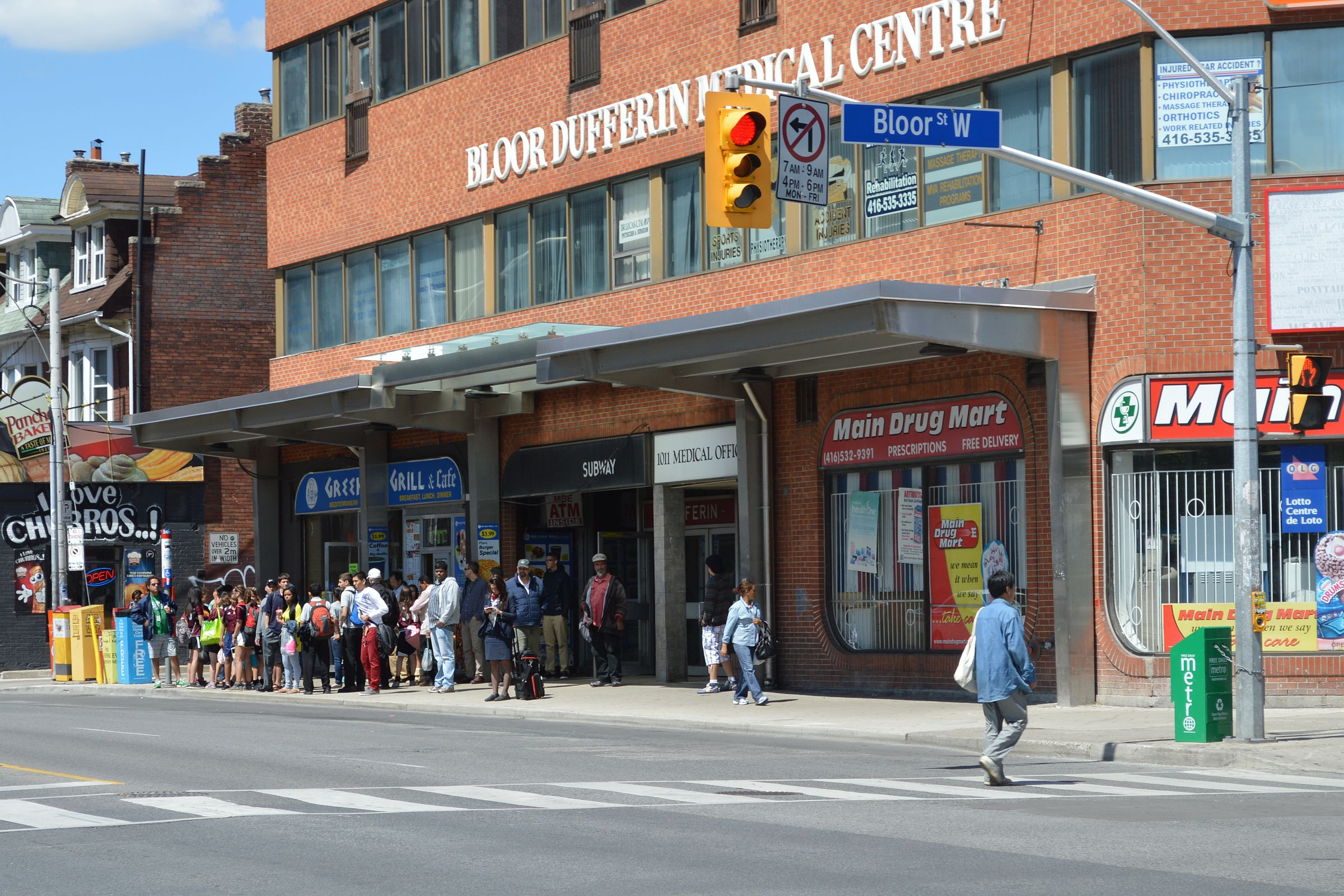
A stop for northbound buses is located under a canopy outside the entrance on the east side of Dufferin Street
