= Ossington station =

Toronto subway station

Ossington
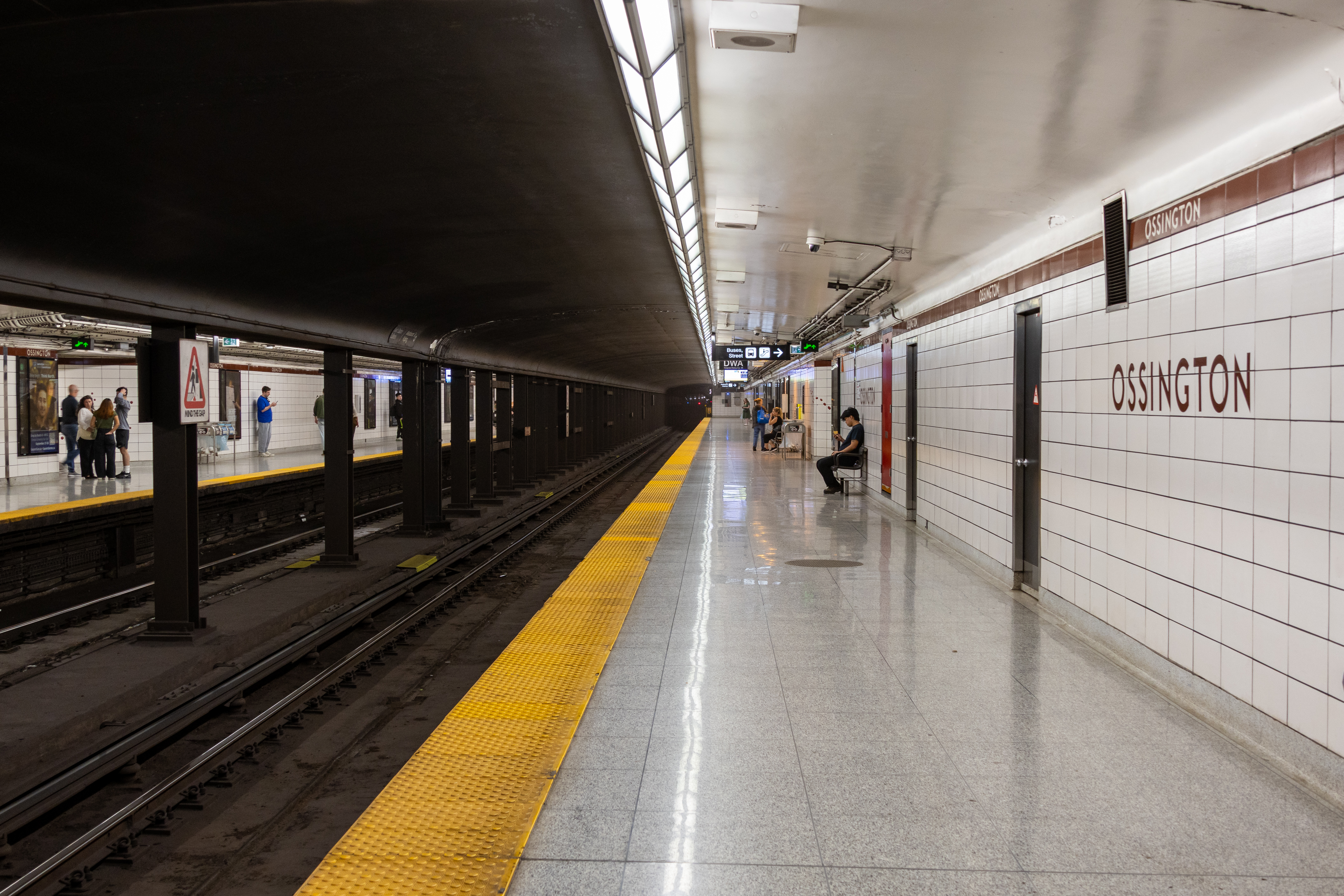

General information
- Location: 746 Ossington Avenue, Toronto, Ontario; Canada
- Coordinates: 43°39′45″N 79°25′34″W
- Platforms: Side platforms
- Tracks: 2
- Connections: TTC buses: 63 Ossington; 94A Wellesley; 161 Rogers Rd; 300 Bloor - Danforth; 363 Ossington

Construction
- Structure type: Underground
- Accessible: Yes

Other information
- Website: Official station page

History
- Opened: February 26, 1966; 60 years ago

Passengers
- 2023–2024: 22,109
- Rank: 26 of 70

Services
Preceding station	Toronto Transit Commission	Following station
Dufferin towards Kipling	Line 2 Bloor–Danforth	Christie towards Kennedy
Location

Ossington is a subway station on Line 2 Bloor–Danforth of the Toronto subway in Toronto, Ontario, Canada. It is located at Ossington Avenue just north of Bloor Street West and opened in 1966 as part of the original segment of the subway line.

== Description ==
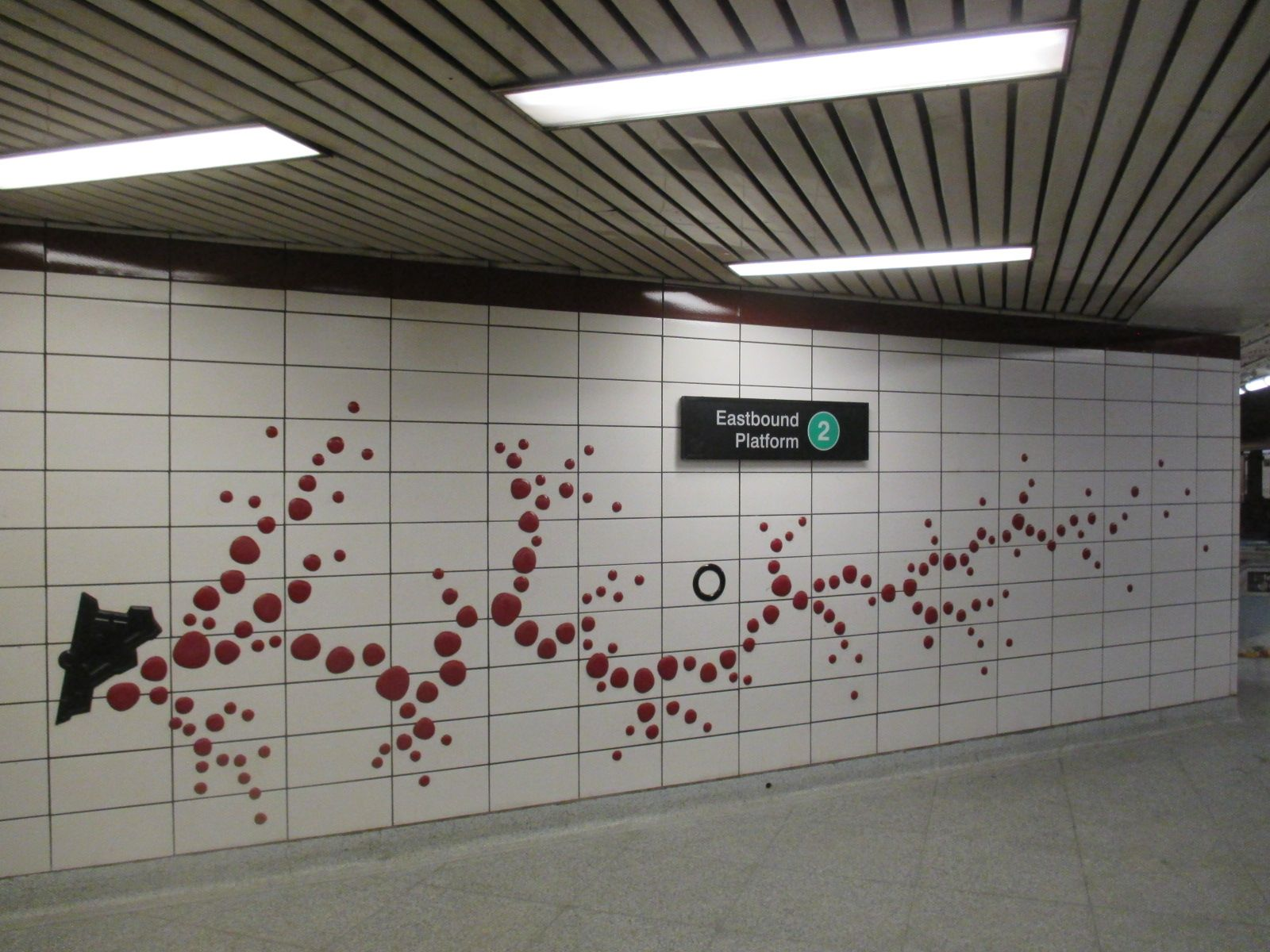
Artwork Ossington Particles

The main station entrance is on the west side of Ossington Avenue, just north of Bloor. In December 2016, elevators were installed at this station, thus making Ossington station a fully accessible station. There is a second automatic entrance, with entry only by Presto card, on Delaware Avenue, beside a TTC electrical substation.

As part of the 2016 renovation, the station acquired the artwork Ossington Particles by Scott Eunson. The artwork uses 800 stick-on coloured acrylic tiles arranged in clusters near stairways on the platform and mezzanine levels. Plaques in the station provide an artist's message: "The Particles inhabit the tile grid of Ossington Station to tell a story of the natural and human history of this site, mapping the local Garrison Creek watershed and recalling the ancient landscape and geology of this neighborhood."

== Surface connections ==
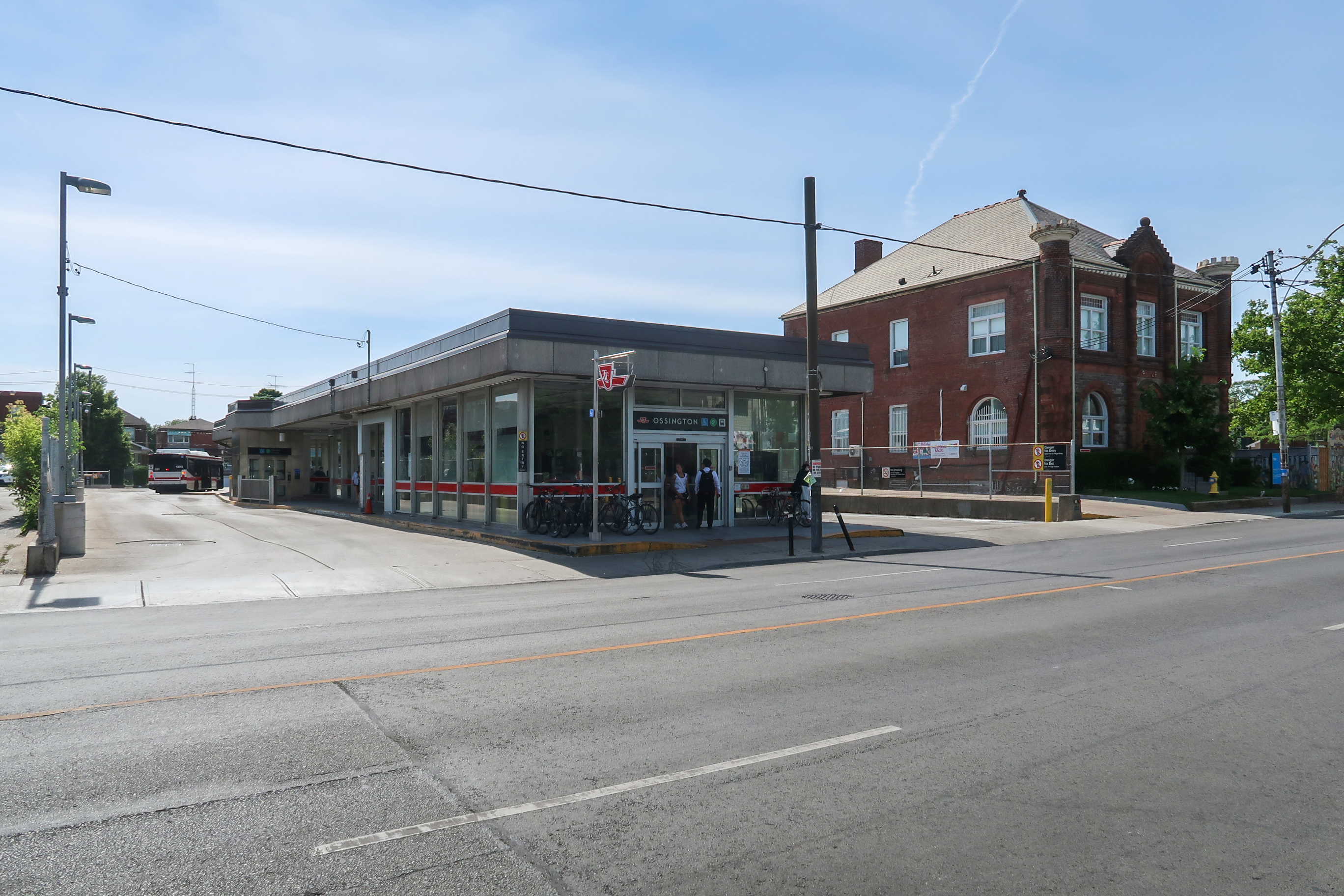
Exterior of the station

TTC routes serving the station include:

Bay number	Route	Name	Additional information
1	Wheel-Trans		
2	63A	Ossington	Northbound to Cedarvale station
2	63B	Ossington	Northbound to St. Clair Avenue West (Rush hour service)
3	161	Rogers Road	Westbound to Mount Dennis station
4	94A	Wellesley	Eastbound to Castle Frank station
5	63A/B	Ossington	Southbound to Liberty Village
6	Unused		
N/A	363	Ossington	Blue Night service; northbound to Cedarvale station and southbound to Canadian National Exhibition

== Easier access program ==
In the summer of 2014, work has begun on the station to make it accessible to all customers. Improvements to the station include two new elevators to access the subway platforms, automatic sliding doors, barrier free access to the platform, security upgrades, and signage improvements.
