= East Danforth =

- Neighbourhood
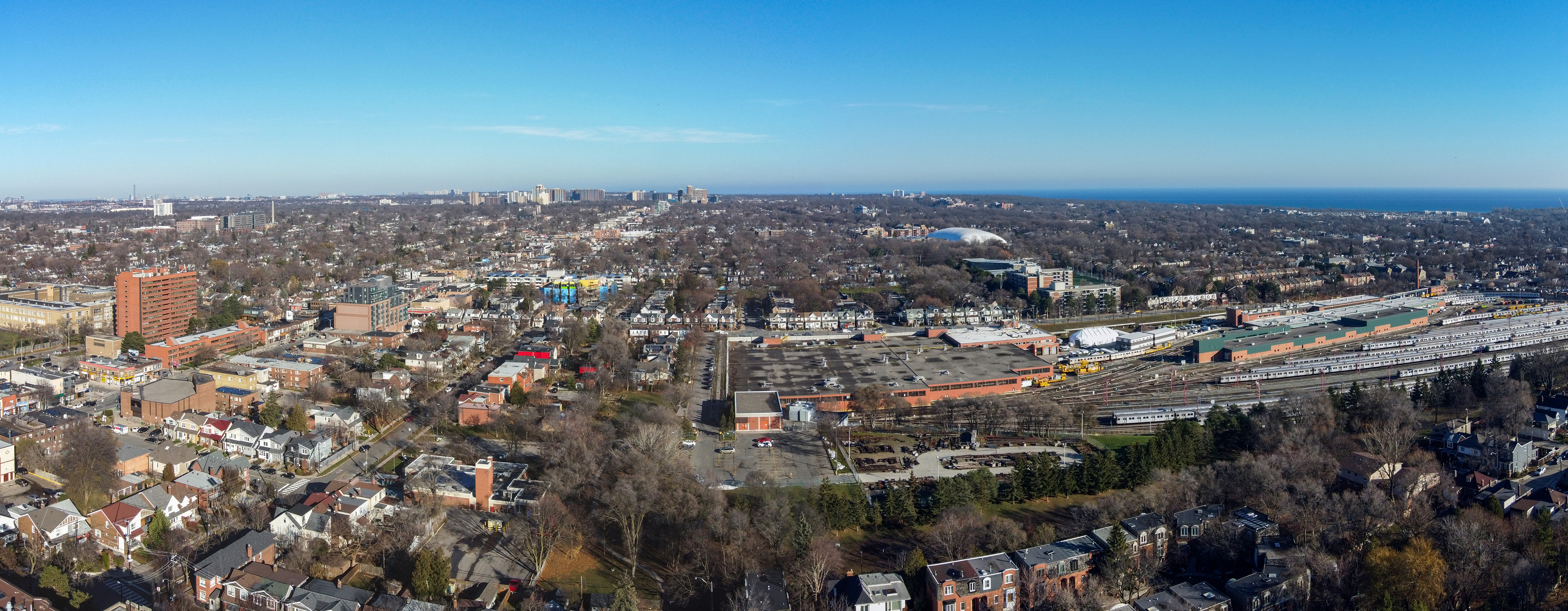
- Aerial view of East Danforth (2022)

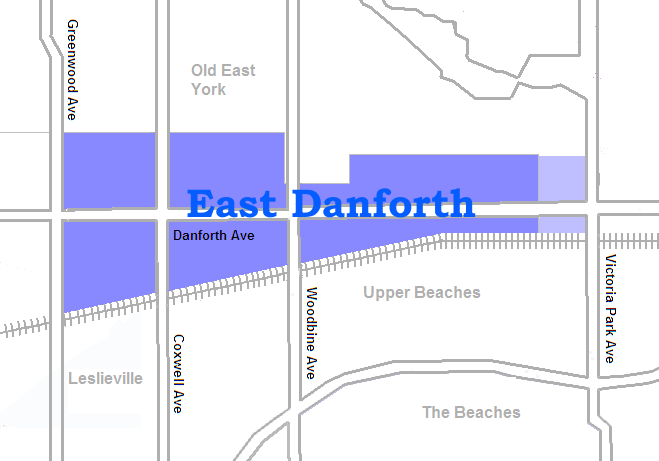
- Map of East Danforth

- Location within Toronto
- Coordinates: 43°41′17″N 79°18′07″W
- Country: Canada
- Province: Ontario
- City: Toronto
- Community: Toronto and East York
- Established: 'Coleman'
- Changed Municipality: 1888 East Toronto from York; 1908 Toronto (former) from East Toronto; 1998 Toronto from Toronto (former)

Government
  - MP: Nathaniel Erskine-Smith (Beaches-East York)
  - MPP: Mary-Margaret McMahon (Beaches-East York)
  - Councillor: Brad Bradford (Ward 19)Beaches-East York

East Danforth, also known as Danforth Village, is an informal neighbourhood in the east end of Toronto, Ontario, Canada. It is located on the eastern part of Danforth Avenue, from the eastern edge of Greektown by Greenwood Avenue to the boundary of Scarborough at Victoria Park Avenue. The area is covered by two business improvement associations, Danforth Village and Danforth Mosaic. To the north of the neighbourhood is Old East York, once a separate municipality, but today closely integrated into the area. The southern border is the railway tracks, beyond which is Leslieville and the Upper Beaches.

== History ==
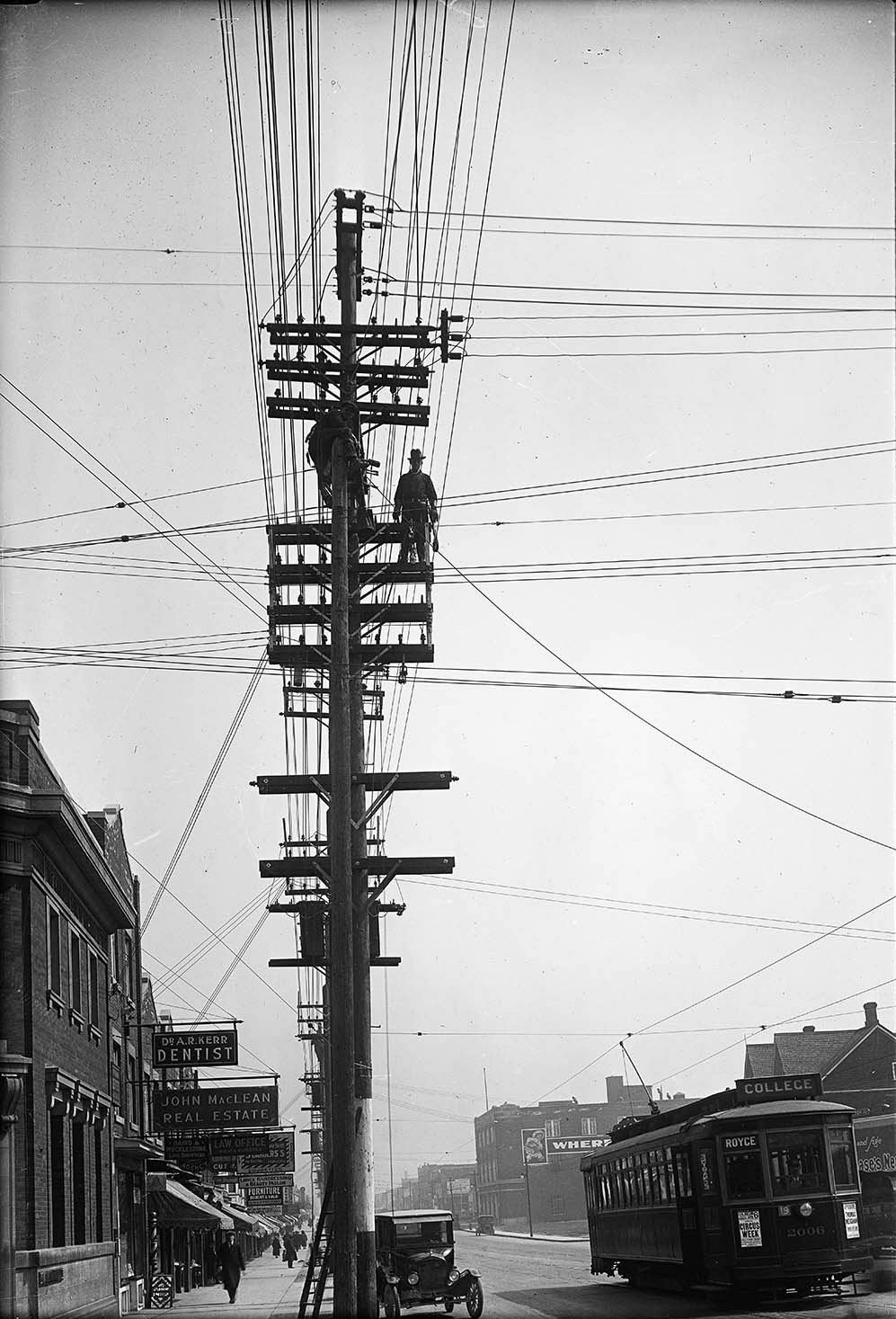
A streetcar passed through Danforth Village, 1925. The Village developed as a streetcar suburb in the early-20th century.

The area first appeared in the 19th century as the 'Coleman' postal village centered on the intersection of Danforth and Dawes (a street built through the lands of the local Taylor family) with a general store and inn. With the building of the railways in the mid-19th century the area acquired a train station, East Toronto.

By the turn of the century the area was called "Little York" (an original name of Toronto) and became a part of the short-lived Town of East Toronto. The turn of the 20th century also brought the construction of the Prince Edward Viaduct connecting Bloor and Danforth, which encouraged the development of the Luttrell Loop on Danforth, and a streetcar terminus for the Bloor-Danforth, Gerrard and former Coxwell streetcar routes which connected to the old train station.

The area developed from the 1910s through the 1930s as a streetcar suburb along the Danforth streetcar line. Most of the housing to the north and south of the street dates from this period. In 1966 the Bloor-Danforth subway line replaced the streetcar. The neighbourhood is served by six subway stations: Donlands, Greenwood, Coxwell, Woodbine, Main, and Victoria Park stations.

In the 1960s and 1970s, a number of apartment towers were built in the area, most notably the Crescent Town area just north of Danforth at Victoria Park and the Main Square complex south of Danforth at Main Street. Most of the area remains low-rise, with low-end stores along Danforth and single-family homes to the north and south. At the far east of the neighborhood is the Shoppers World Danforth, a strip/shopping mall built in 1962 (revamped in the 1990s) and housed in a former munitions factory.

== Demographics ==
The district is within several City of Toronto official neighbourhoods: Danforth, Greenwood-Coxwell, Woodbine Corridor and East End Danforth.

== Culture ==
The area contains numerous Anglican churches, including St. Luke Anglican Church (at Coxwell and Cosburne Avenues.), St. Andrew’s Japanese Anglican Church (at Donlands Ave. and Chan Lane) and Church of the Resurrection (at Woodbine Ave. and Milverton Blvd.). Orthodox Christianity in the area is represented by Metamorphosis Greek Orthodox Church (at Donlands Ave. and Strathmore Blvd.), St. Raphael Greek Orthodox Church (at Glebemount and Barker Avenues), and the Holy Trinity Macedono-Bulgarian Eastern Orthodox Church (at Glebeholme Blvd. and Monarch Park Ave.).

The neighbourhood is home to one of Toronto's oldest mosques, Madina Masjid, established in 1974 by Gujarati immigrants from India. It underwent major renovations in 2007 and is now, at more than 30,000 square feet, also one of Toronto's largest mosques. In addition to the Madina Masjid (mentioned above), East Danforth is also home to Masjid Taqwa (at Danforth and Greenwood Avenues), established by Sri Lankan immigrants in 1996.

== Schools ==
- Earl Haig Public School is an elementary-middle school, which enrolls students from kindergarten to grade 8.
- George Webster Public School is an elementary-middle school, which enrolls students from kindergarten to grade 8.
- Secord Elementary School is an elementary school, which enrolls students from kindergarten to grade 5.
- Earl Beatty Public School is an elementary-middle school, which enrolls students from kindergarten to grade 8.
- Gledhill Public School is an elementary school which enrolls students from Junior Kindergarten to Grade 5.
- St. Brigid Catholic School is an elementary school offering classes from Junior Kindergarten to Grade 8.
