= Greenwood Yard =

Coordinates: 43°40′40″N 79°19′55″W

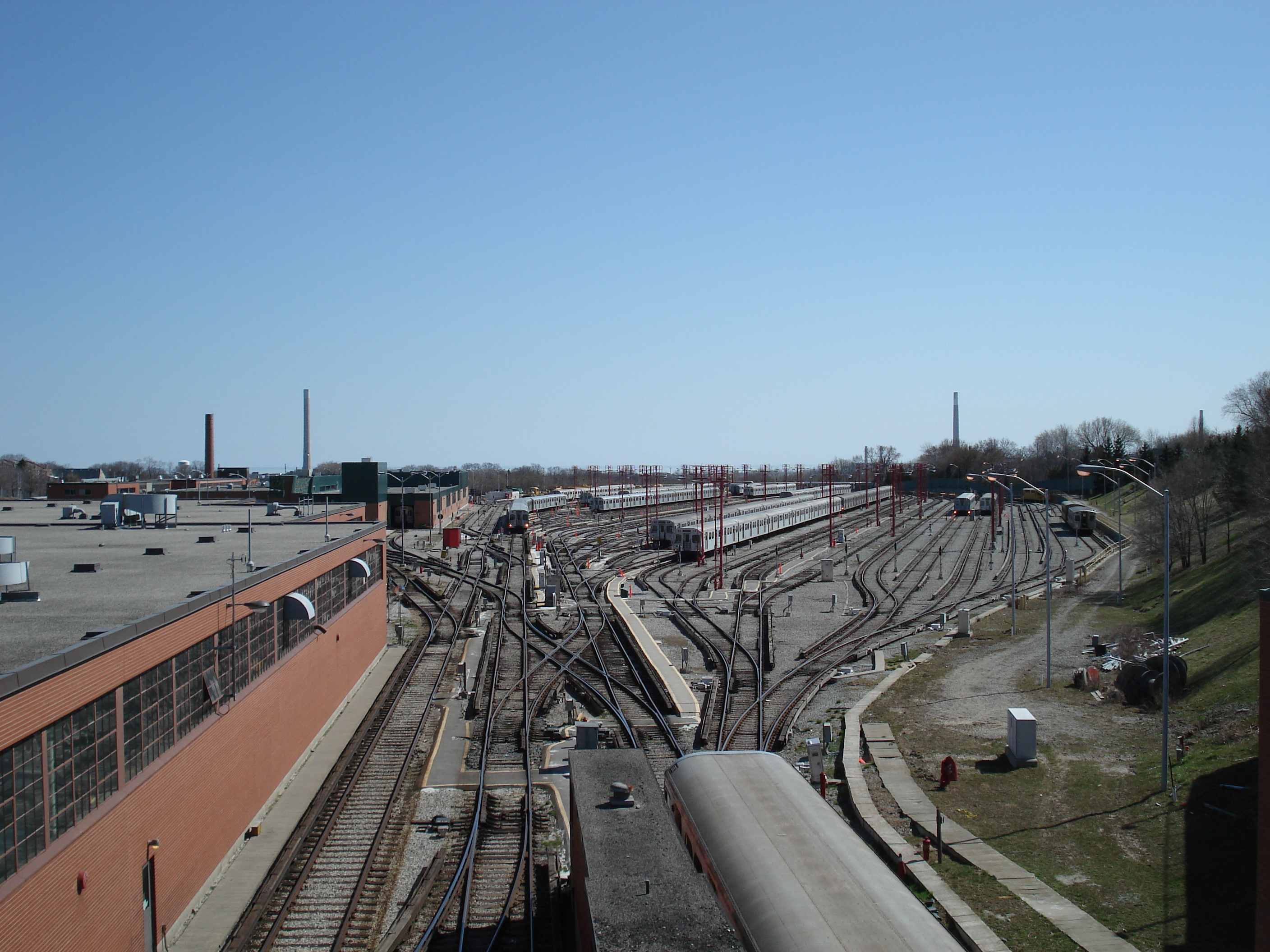
A subway train about to enter Greenwood yard as seen from above the Greenwood Portal

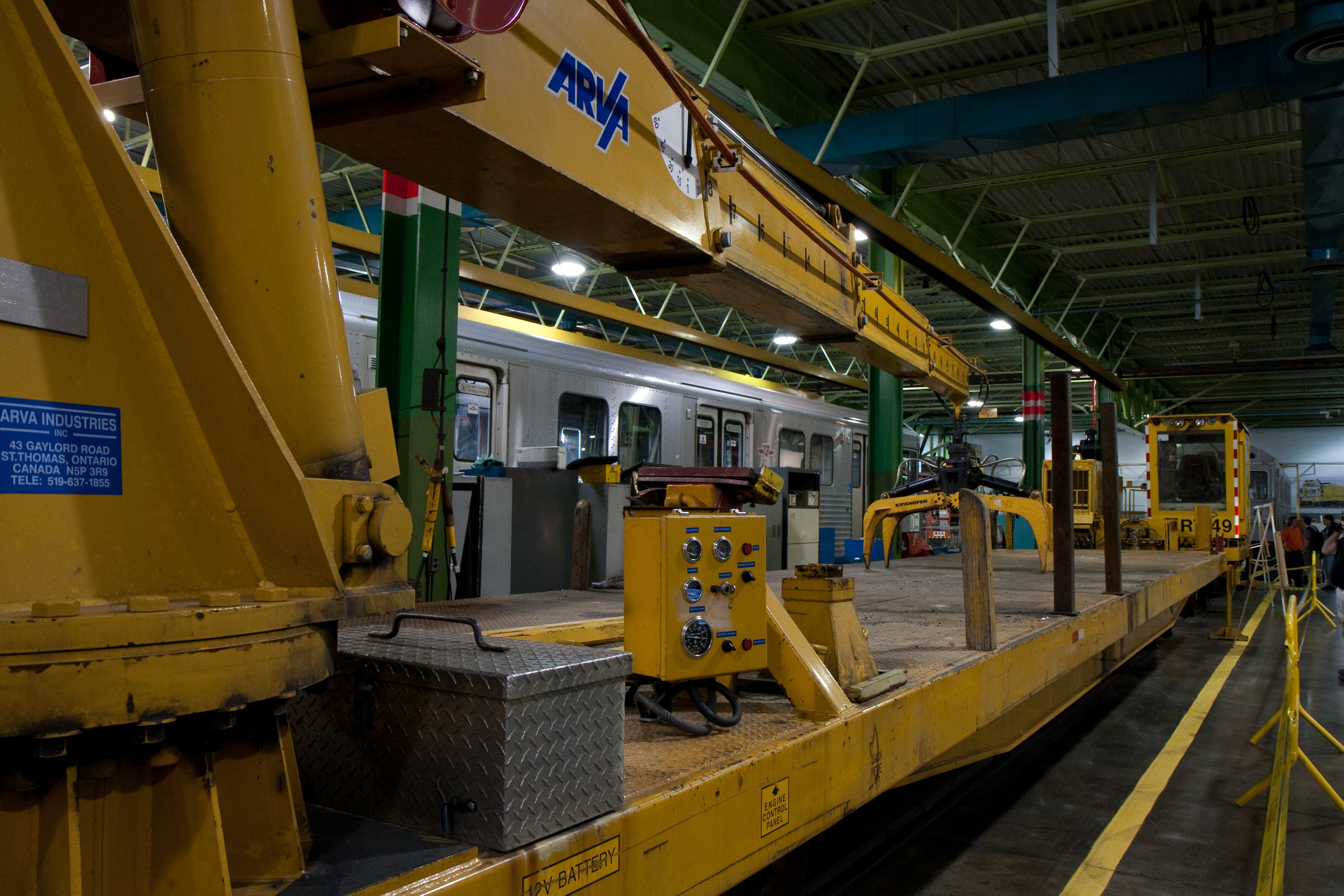
A work car parked inside the Greenwood Shop

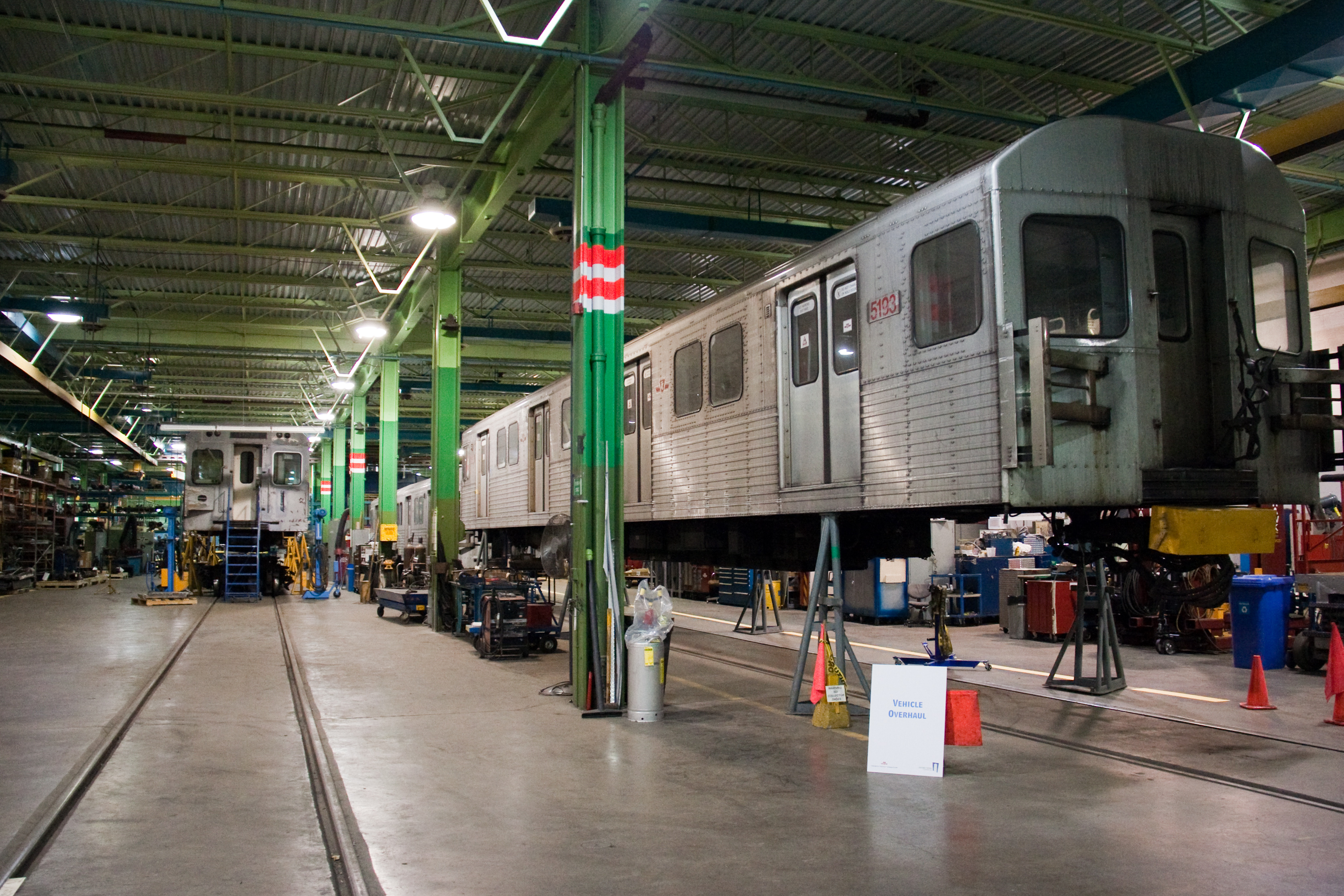
TTC's Greenwood Shop located at the complex

The Greenwood Yard (also known as the Greenwood Complex) is a rail yard with support buildings that service subway vehicles on Line 2 Bloor–Danforth of the Toronto subway.

Greenwood is one of two subway yards on Line 2, the other being the much smaller Keele Subway Yard.

== Site ==
Spanning 31 acres (13 ha), the Greenwood Yard is located at 400 Greenwood Avenue, on the west side of Greenwood south of Danforth Avenue. The site is bordered on the west, north and east sides by residential areas, and on the south side by a railway line.

The yard contains five buildings, two of which are the General Overhaul and Repair Shop (a.k.a. Greenwood Shop) with a floor space of 185,000 square feet (17,200 m^{2}), and the carhouse for inspection, minor repairs and washing. The Greenwood Shop has specialized shops for heavy overhauls of subway cars and components as well as stores. The Greenwood Shop is operationally separate from the carhouse servicing the Bloor–Danforth subway fleet.

When it opened, the yard had a storage capacity for 244 subway cars. The yard currently has a 328-car storage capacity.

The Greenwood Yard is connected to the Bloor–Danforth line by a multi-level wye between Donlands and Greenwood stations; the wye allows both east- and westbound mainline trains access to the yard. The arrangement allows for trains to be added into or taken out of service with minimum disruption to ongoing operations.

== Current operations ==
Greenwood Yard is home to approximately half the commission's fleet of trains and work cars. The yard regularly houses the majority of the fleet of T1 subway cars and all Line 2 trains overnight.

Greenwood Yard provides storage, inspection and running maintenance for the Line 2 revenue fleet, and contains major overhaul and repair shops for the entire subway fleet. Greenwood Yard is also a centre for the servicing and operation of workcars used by the Track and Structure Department to repair and maintain the entire subway system.

The Greenwood Yard also performed heavy maintenance on the S series ICTS cars from Line 3 Scarborough that could not be completed at the McCowan Yard. As the gauge and technology differed between lines 2 and 3, ICTS cars had to be transported by truck to Greenwood for major maintenance work.

Greenwood Yard, like other active Toronto Transit Commission yards, operates 24 hours per day, 7 days per week. Yard activity is minimal during the peak service periods when many trains are in revenue service. The yard is particularly busy in the evening and early morning hours to service and maintain the subway fleet after which the trains are put into position to go into service in the morning.

== History ==
Prior to construction, most of the yard site used to be a clay quarry that later became Harper's Dump, Toronto's main landfill in the 1930s. The site also contained some residences which were demolished.

In May 1965, the Greenwood Yard was put into partial service for some repair work. Heavy maintenance of subway bogies was transferred from the Hillcrest Complex to Greenwood.

On February 26, 1966, the yard went into full service with the opening of Line 2 Bloor–Danforth.

When it opened, the yard had a railway siding and some four rail, dual gauge (4 ft 10 7/8 in or 1,495 mm and 1,435 mm or 4 ft 8 1/2 in standard gauge) track for the delivery of subway cars from the manufacturer. However, circa 2013, the TTC removed the standard gauge track to make more room for subway car storage. By 2016, the standard gauge siding had been severed from both the yard and the railway mainline.

== Future ==
Plans for the current yard to be used for the Relief Line involved T1 cars being moved to the new Kipling Yard.
