= Line 2 Bloor–Danforth =

Rapid transit line in Toronto, Ontario

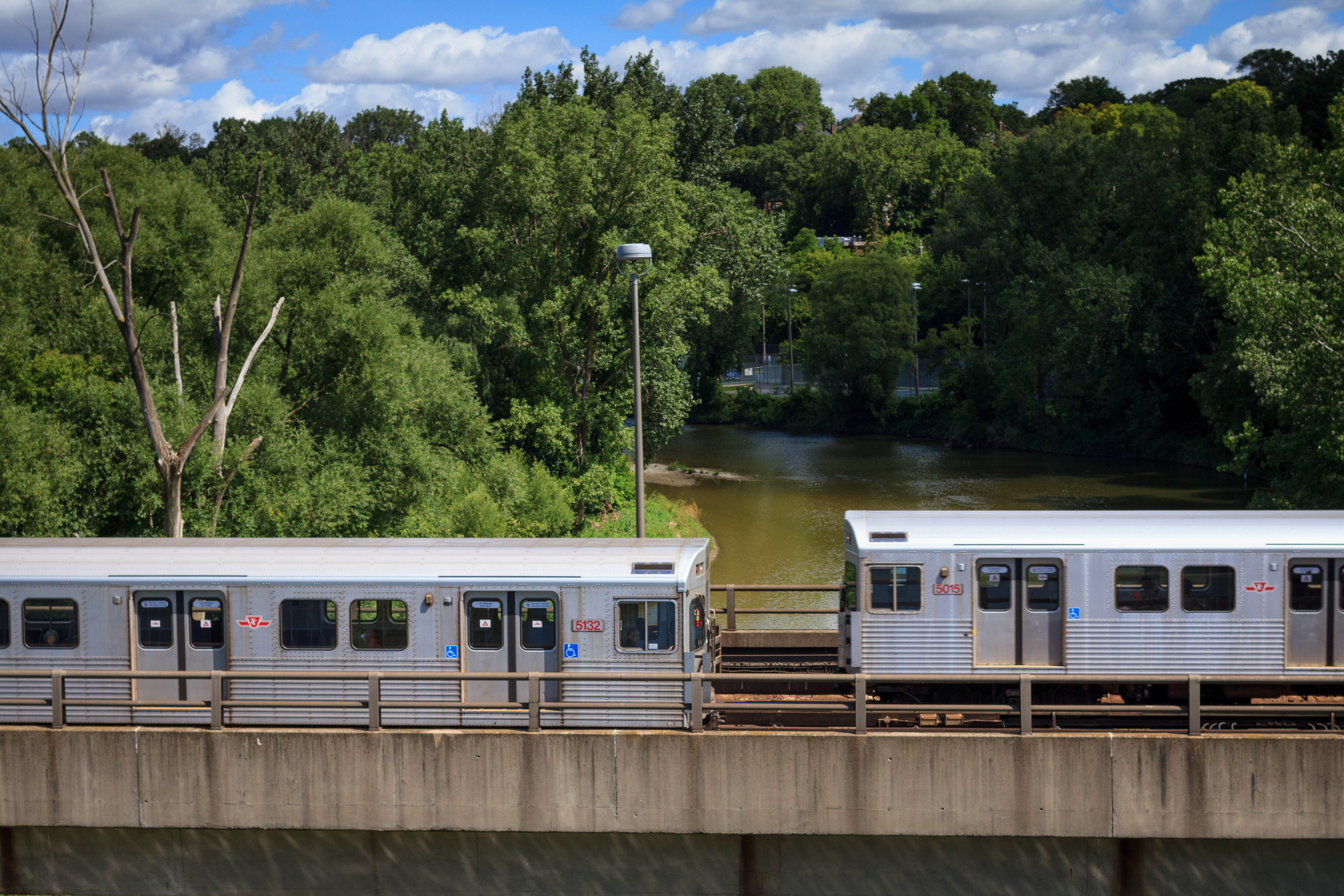
- Trains crossing the Humber River near Old Mill station

Overview
- Status: Operational
- Owner: City of Toronto (Kipling to Kennedy); Metrolinx (Line 2 extension)
- Locale: Toronto, Ontario
- Termini: Kipling; Kennedy
- Stations: 31 (3 under construction)
- Website: Official route page

Service
- Type: Rapid transit
- System: Toronto subway
- Operator: Toronto Transit Commission
- Depots: Greenwood Yard; Keele Yard
- Rolling stock: T1
- Daily ridership: 460,800 (November 2025)

History
- Opened: February 26, 1966; 60 years ago
- Last extension: 1980

Technical
- Line length: 26.2 km (16.3 mi); 7.8 km (4.8 mi) under construction
- Track gauge: 1,495 mm (4 ft 10 7/8 in) Toronto gauge
- Electrification: Third rail, 600 V DC
- Operating speed: 50 km/h (31 mph)
- Signalling: Automatic block signaling
Route map
Line 2 Bloor–Danforth highlighted in green

Line 2 Bloor–Danforth is a rapid transit line in the Toronto subway system, operated by the Toronto Transit Commission (TTC). It has 31 stations and is 26.2 kilometres (16.3 mi) in length. It opened on February 26, 1966, and extensions at both ends were completed in 1968 and again in 1980.

The line runs primarily a few metres north of Bloor Street from its western terminus at Kipling Avenue with a direct connection to the Kipling GO Station to the Prince Edward Viaduct east of Castle Frank Road, after which the street continues as Danforth Avenue and the line continues running a few metres north of Danforth Avenue until just east of Main Street, where it bends northeasterly and runs above-grade until just east of Warden station, where it continues underground to its eastern terminus, slightly east of Kennedy Road on Eglinton Avenue. The subway line is closed nightly for maintenance, during which Blue Night Network bus routes provide service along the route.

The most travelled part of the line is located in Toronto's midtown area known as Yorkville. In this area, the subway connects to Line 1 Yonge–University at Spadina, St. George and Bloor–Yonge stations. Towards the east, where the line runs parallel to Danforth Avenue, it serves areas such as Greektown (also known as "the Danforth") and the East Danforth neighbourhood. It then runs through a very short stretch of East York to its eastern terminus in Scarborough, where it connects to Line 5 Eglinton and formerly connected to Line 3 Scarborough. To the west of Yorkville, the line continues along Bloor Street serving many communities such as the Annex, Koreatown, Bloorcourt Village, Bloordale Village, Junction Triangle, Bloor West Village, a very short stretch in York, and the Kingsway and Islington–Etobicoke City Centre areas in Etobicoke, where it terminates at Kipling Avenue in the Six Points neighbourhood.

Construction of an extension to Sheppard Avenue and McCowan Road to replace Line 3 Scarborough began on June 23, 2021. When construction began, the projected completion date for the extension was 2030; by September 2025, Metrolinx would not confirm the original target.

== Name ==
When the Bloor–Danforth line, the second subway line in the city, opened in 1966, it necessitated renaming the first subway line "the Yonge line". Unofficially, the subway lines were already numbered, but in October 2013, the TTC announced plans to give the lines an official number to help riders and visitors to navigate the system. The new signage reflecting this change began being installed in March 2014, with Bloor–Yonge and St. George being the first two stations updated. The subway was formerly internally known as route 601. Since the mid-2010s, it is publicly referred to as "Line 2 Bloor–Danforth".

== History ==
=== Pre-subway era ===
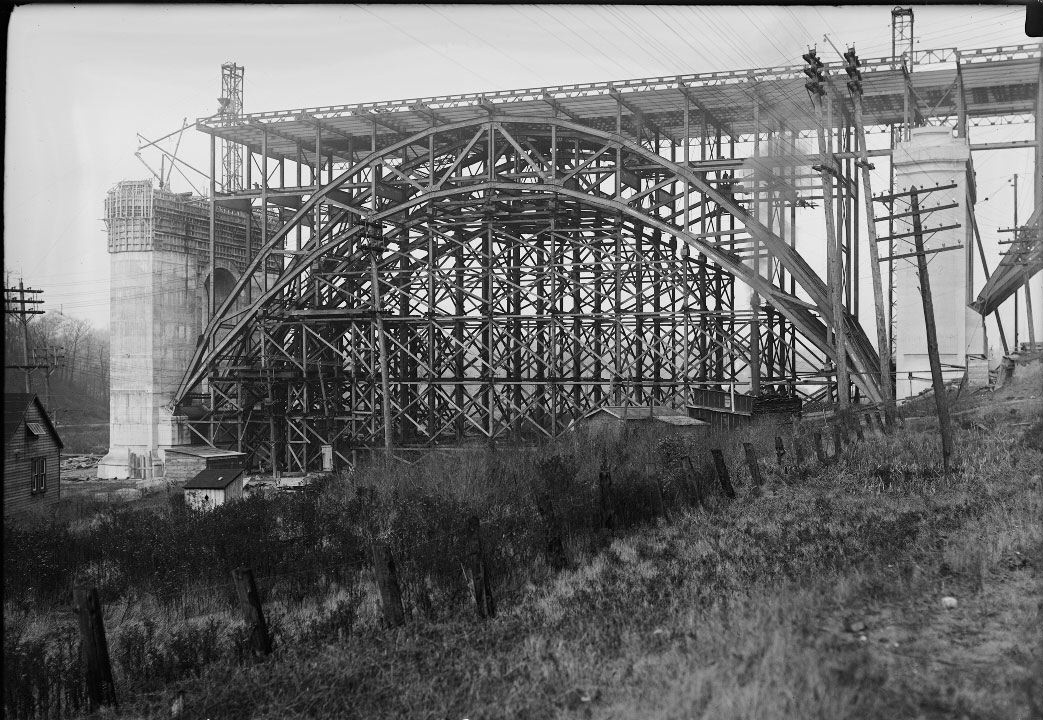
Construction of the Prince Edward Viaduct over the Don River in 1916, whose lower deck now carries Line 2 Bloor–Danforth

The earliest mention of rapid transit along the Bloor–Danforth line's route was made in a 1910 report that was prepared by an American firm of transit consultants. This study had been commissioned by a special commission, which included City Controller Horatio Clarence Hocken and Mayor of Toronto Joseph Oliver. In their final report, the consultants suggested that the Prince Edward Viaduct, which spans the Don River Valley, should include a lower deck for a future subway. The lower deck was built, but the first plan for a line to use it was not made until June 15, 1933, when the TTC published a report which suggested construction of a subway and an expressway broadly following Bloor Street and Danforth Avenue. The estimated cost of the project was CA$120 million, but the plan was not implemented. Plans for a somewhat longer route, running east to west from Victoria Park Avenue to the Humber River, were proposed by the Toronto Planning Board in December 1943, although the report did not include costings. During the fall of 1911, the City of Toronto put out a tender for the construction of concrete tubes to carry a subway. However, when the cost of the subway was put to a referendum, the construction of the subway tunnels was rejected.

Before the subway was built, the Bloor streetcar line operated along the route between Jane Street and Luttrell Avenue (located just west of Shoppers World Danforth). Paired PCC streetcars or multiple units (MUs) operated from 1950 to the opening of the subway line in 1966. The TTC favoured this route because the Prince Edward Viaduct made it easier to build a subway across the Don Valley, and the streetcar that ran along the route was filled with passengers travelling from East York and Scarborough. To provide relief to this streetcar line and to ease expansion into the suburbs, the line was built a few metres north of both Bloor Street and Danforth Avenue.

=== Subway construction ===
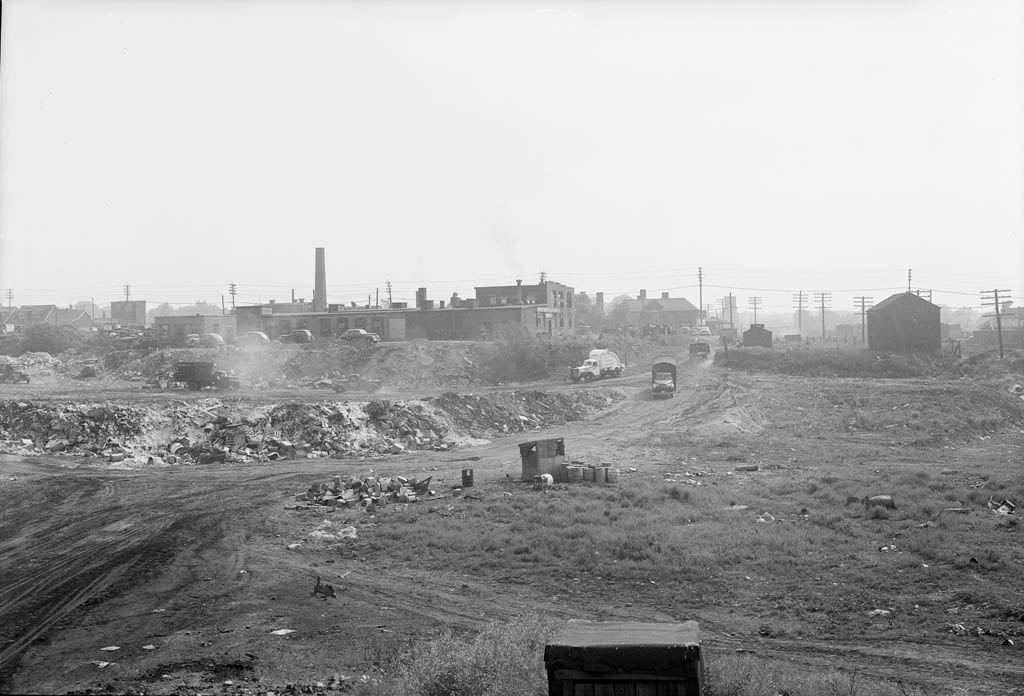
Greenwood Avenue Fill, the area that would eventually become the Greenwood subway yard

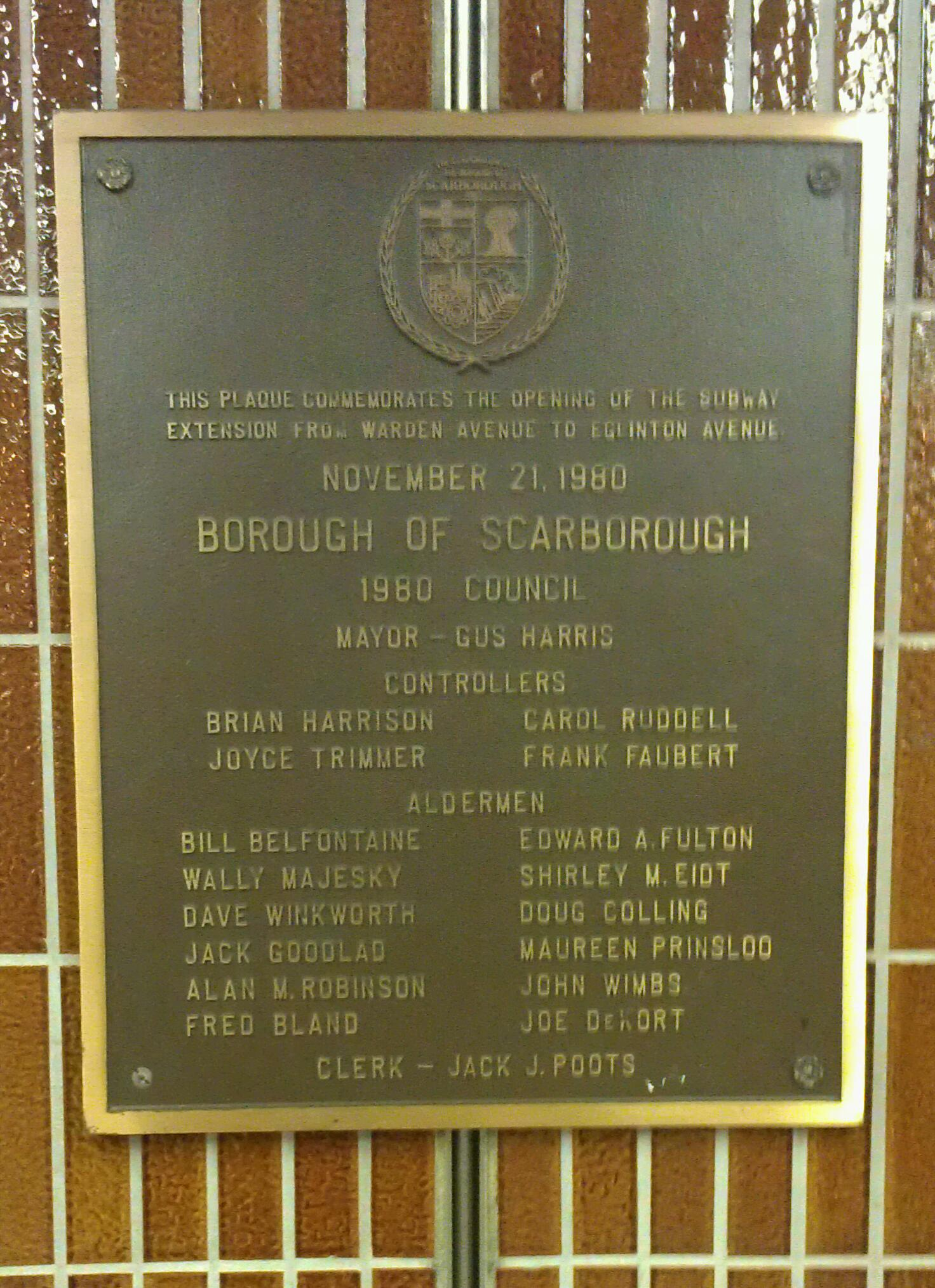
Plaque at Kennedy station commemorating the extension of Line 2 in 1980

During the period after World War II, rapid development created a need for more public transit. A referendum on whether a subway should be constructed along Yonge Street was held on January 1, 1946, and this proposal received majority support. The opening of the Yonge subway in 1954 resulted in another plan by the TTC for a Bloor–Danforth line, this time without an expressway, costing $146 million. The line was approved, but was not built.

In the 1950s, there was intense debate over where the second Toronto subway line would run as it would affect how bus routes in Toronto's suburbs would operate. There were two main plans. While both shared the same route at the outer ends, the TTC favoured a route that continued eastwards from Christie station to Pape station. This plan was championed by the TTC chairman, Allan Lamport, and also included an extension of the Yonge line from Union station northwards to meet the new line at St. George station. The other plan, which was proposed by the city's planning department and endorsed by the Metro Toronto chairman, Fred Gardiner, had a large U-shaped diversion in the centre. From Christie station, it ran south to Queen Street West, and after following Queen Street eastwards to Pape Avenue, turned north to rejoin the east–west route at Pape station. The eastern routing is similar to the Relief Line subway proposal of the 2010s and its successor, the Ontario Line.

In 1956, Toronto's midtown area was starting to experience growth. There was a public debate about the two schemes between the two chairmen and the municipalities that made up Metropolitan Toronto. The extension of the Yonge line along University Avenue, and the east–west Bloor–Danforth line extension were authorized on September 5, 1958 by the Ontario Municipal Board which sought a compromise between the involved communities. The financing of the project was controversial. For the first time, financing was to be split between the TTC and Metro Toronto, incurring a property tax increase. This was opposed by Etobicoke, Long Branch, Mimico, New Toronto and Scarborough, who wanted the project to be funded solely by the TTC. The battle to stop the project went to the Supreme Court of Canada.

The University line opened in 1963, and the Bloor–Danforth line opened from Keele station in the west to Woodbine station in the east on February 26, 1966. Nine men died during its construction in several incidents. Most of the line was built underground using the cut-and-cover method, with some sections along University Avenue built using shield tunneling with manual excavation of the face – and even a short stretch using the Milan tunneling method (a.k.a. the Icos–Veder method). Other parts of the line were built above ground in grade-separated rail corridors. The line was 12.9 kilometres (8.0 mi) long, and ran about 20 to 40 metres (66 to 131 ft) north of Bloor Street and Danforth Avenue. The cost of the initial section was $200 million ($2.146 billion in 2025 dollars).

Once the line started full operation, construction of extensions to the Bloor–Danforth line began. The extensions to Islington station in the west and Warden station in the east opened simultaneously on May 11, 1968. These were completed at a cost of $77 million ($673 million in 2025 dollars). On November 21, 1980, the line was extended to the current terminal stations of Kipling station in the west and Kennedy station in the east at a further cost of $110 million ($411 million in 2025 dollars).

=== Subway operations ===
Upon opening, the Bloor–Danforth line was well received: a survey taken four months later showed that the subway was used by 10,000 riders per hour. As a result, many bus and streetcar routes were either discontinued or shortened. Various bus and streetcar routes that connected to the subway stations allowed the line to continue to grow and become more sustainable. The line carried an average of 503,060 passengers on weekdays during the 2015 operating year.

For the first six months of operation, the subway was operated as a single system, with trains from Eglinton station running through to either Keele or Woodbine station, while other trains connected the latter two points. However, the manoeuvre made operation of both lines more difficult, and the practice was abandoned after the initial trial period, leaving Lower Bay station abandoned.

In 1971, Metro Council insisted that the zone fare system be removed to allow residents of the suburbs to travel anywhere with a single fare. Prior to this, stations west of Old Mill and east of Victoria Park were geographically part of Zone 2 for fare purposes, but the subway used a flat fare system, so they were treated as being part of Zone 1. This created problems when transferring from the subway to the buses, which were in different zones at the same location. The solution was a change in political thinking, where the subway was seen as a subsidized public service, instead of a utility that needed to balance its books.

On September 19, 2007, the station modernization program was started. This program would result in making the subway system more accessible, add new bus and streetcar platforms, and improve the connections to regional buses and GO trains.

== Stations ==
Kipling station, the western terminus of Line 2 Bloor–Danforth, is located near Kipling Avenue and Dundas Street West. After going east for 12 kilometres (7.5 mi), it meets the University segment of Line 1 at both Spadina and St. George stations. It also meets the Yonge Street segment of Line 1 at Bloor–Yonge station. The route's eastern terminus is located at Kennedy station. The line does not run under Bloor Street or Danforth Avenue, except at the Prince Edward Viaduct; otherwise, it is offset to the north by about a city block to minimize disruption. In some areas, it runs under parks and parking lots behind the businesses on the north side of the street, while other sections run under side streets.

Most stations on the Bloor–Danforth line have side platforms. At the surface, some stations are designed to be a part of a shopping area, which are located above the subway. Other stations are large facilities on the surface that also contain bus and/or streetcar platforms to allow transfers to take place.

=== Designs ===
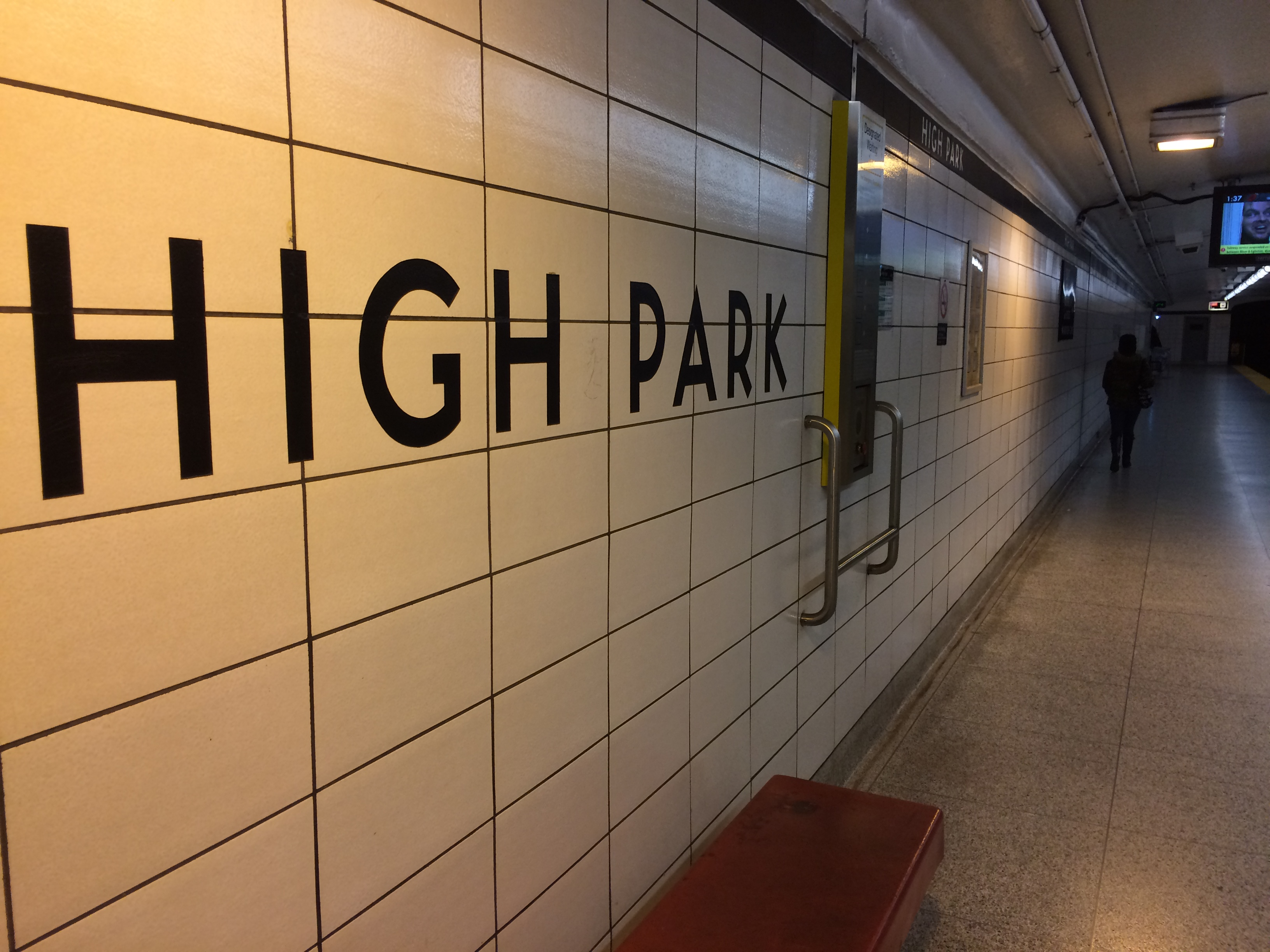
High Park station in 2014, depicting the standard design of most Line 2 stations

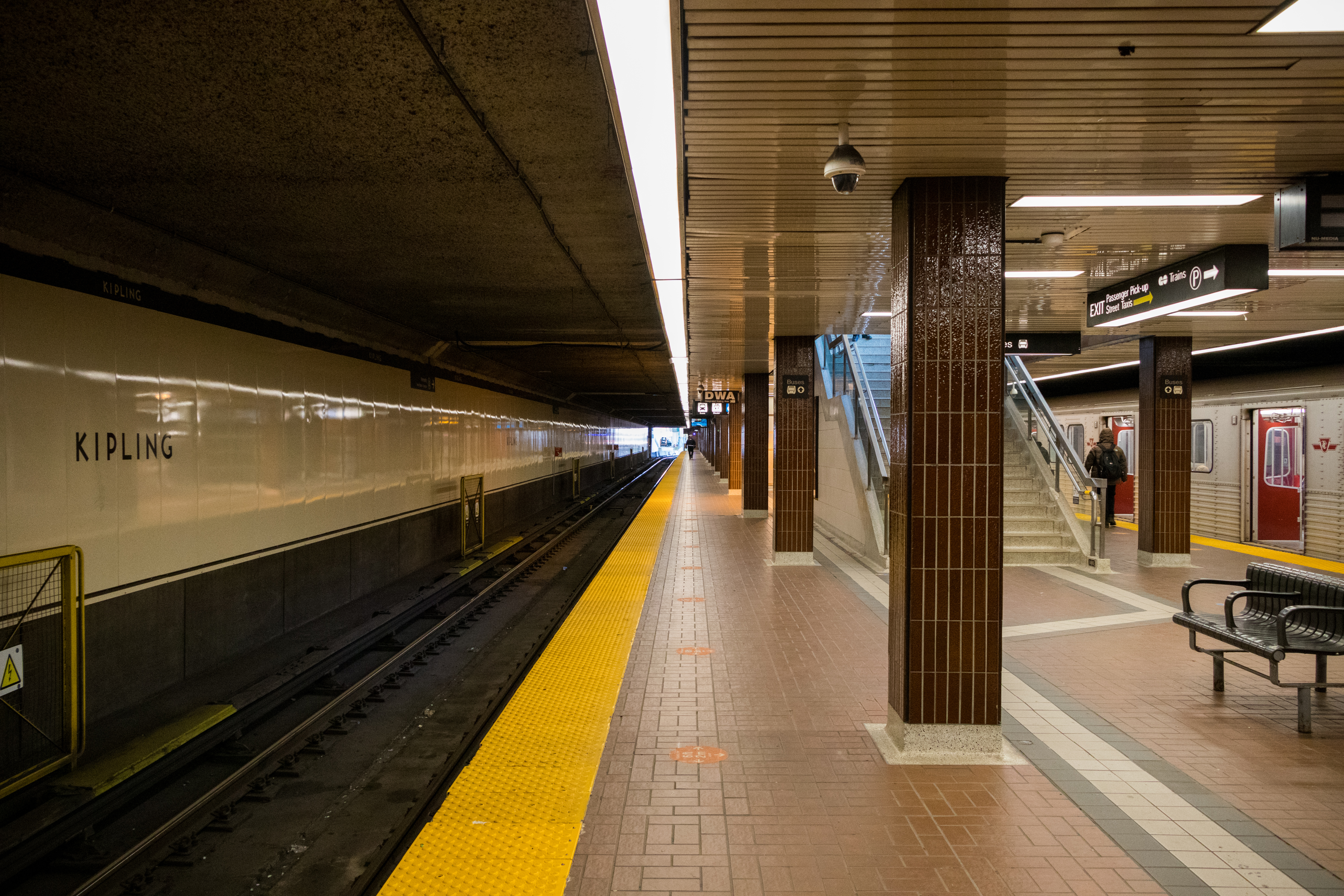
Kipling station in 2021 after the late 2017 renovation

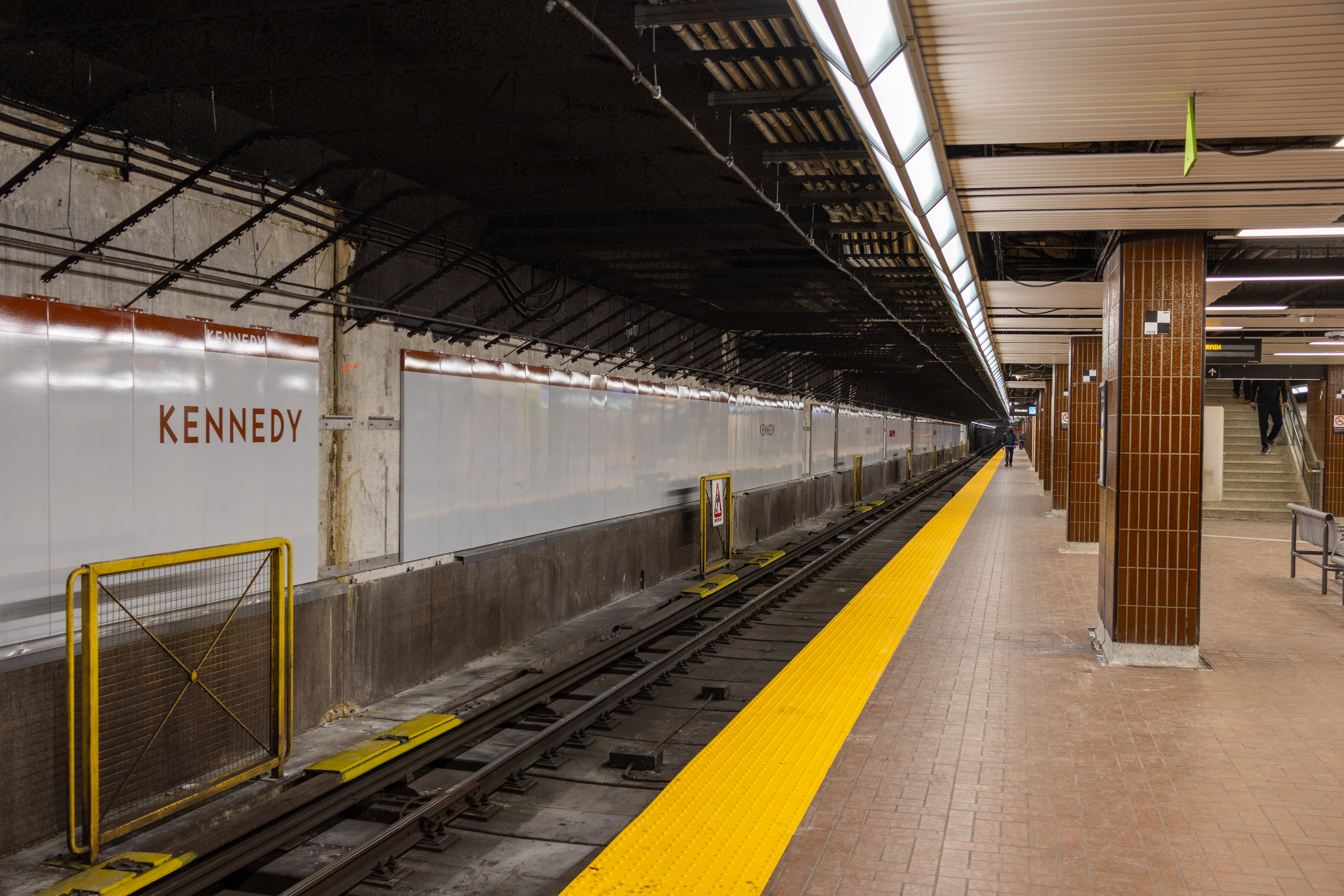
Kennedy station in 2026 after the late 2025 renovation

The pre-1980 subway stations of the Bloor–Danforth line follow a two-colour background and trim theme and use the unique Toronto Subway typeface on the stations' walls. The tiling theme was influenced by SEPTA's Broad Street Subway (later renamed the B) in Philadelphia and used a cycle that was similar to the design employed on the Yonge subway. This design consists of two colours for the tiles, one for main wall tiles and another for trim tiles near the ceiling of the stations. The station names on the main wall tiles use the colour of the trim tiles and vice versa, except that some of the station names of the trim tiles are white instead of the main wall tile colour for readability.

This pattern is based on a design similar to the stations along the University line, which follow a regular pattern with some small variances, which are the result of multiple events. One of these tiling variances is located at Christie station, where some of the original tiles were replaced following the 1976 arson attack. The replacement trim tiles were differently coloured due to the lack of extra green trim tiles.

Other variations to the pattern can be observed at Islington and Warden stations, as well as at the former bus bay of Victoria Park station, the three of which have a tricolour design. The current terminus stations of Kipling and Kennedy stations, upon initial opening in 1980, resemble the second version of Union subway station. When they opened, Kipling and Kennedy stations were the only Line 2 stations not to use the Toronto Subway typeface. However, in late 2017, Kipling station was redesigned to use the Toronto Subway typeface as well.

=== Modernization program ===
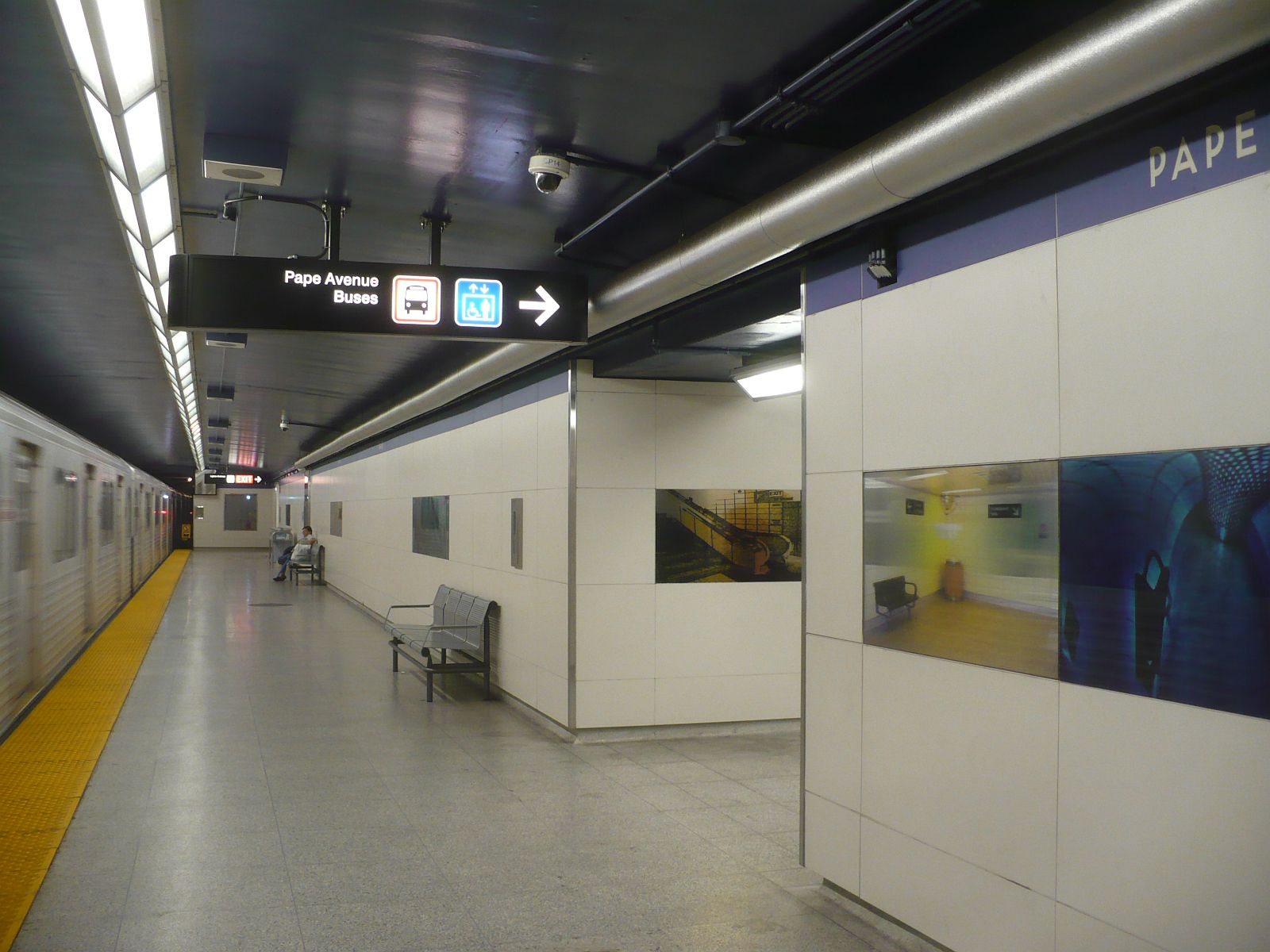
Pape station in 2014 after renovation

As the stations on the line have begun to show signs of aging, the TTC has initiated a station modernization program aimed at improving accessibility and appearances at several subway stations. These modernizations include new and updated wall finishes, signage, lighting and public art, as well as the installation of elevators for accessibility needs. Pape and Dufferin stations are the first slated for modernization under this project, and Islington will also be modernized under larger capital projects aimed at greater accessibility and reconstruction of bus loading platforms. Construction of a second access route at Broadview station was completed in 2007. This work provided direct access to bus platforms and a new streetcar platform, improving traffic control within the station. Victoria Park station's modernization project was completed between 2008 and 2011 to make the station more functional, attractive, better connected to the surrounding community, and fully accessible.

The second exit program was also included in station modernization projects after a fire safety audit revealed several at-risk stations with only one means of access and egress from the subway platform level to the street. Some stations with only one entrance/exit received a second means of access/egress during major overhauls at stations such as Pape and Dufferin. Other stations such as Donlands and Greenwood are scheduled to receive second exits for egress only. Due to the potential for land expropriation and construction of the exit structures in residential neighbourhoods, this portion of the program has become controversial, as some houses need to be removed to accommodate these secondary exits. Plans to add a second exit for Donlands, Greenwood, and Woodbine stations were deferred in late February 2011 due to lack of funding. In September 2017, the addition of elevators and a second exit and automatic entrance were completed at Woodbine station, rendering it fully accessible. As of July 2020, modernization work for Donlands station was planned to begin in the fourth quarter of 2020. It opened in August 2024.

=== Ridership ===
Line 2 ridership, 2023–2024
Station	Boardings
Bloor–Yonge	121,531
St. George	108,866
Kipling	49,392
Kennedy	42,881
Pape	34,506
Victoria Park	32,276
Bathurst	30,598
Spadina	27,601
Dufferin	26,800
Islington	25,023
Sherbourne	24,689
Dundas West	23,861
Ossington	22,109
Warden	21,843
Bay	20,980
Main Street	18,682
Lansdowne	17,406
Royal York	17,337
Keele	16,305
Runnymede	15,838
Jane	14,953
Coxwell	13,450
Broadview	11,720
Christie	11,407
Woodbine	10,803
Greenwood	9,567
High Park	9,173
Castle Frank	8,943
Donlands	6,317
Chester	6,197

== Fare collection ==
All types of TTC fares are accepted at staffed subway station entrances. Presto cards can be purchased and loaded with money or digital monthly TTC passes at automatic fare vending machines, which also sell Presto 1-ride, 2-ride or day pass tickets. Presto cards and tickets are accepted at all TTC subway station entrances.

On December 1, 2019, all subway station collector booths were permanently closed and replaced by roaming customer service attendants. While customers were able to pay their fares by senior or youth TTC tickets, tokens or day passes until 2025, these were no longer available for purchase at stations and no change will be given to customers who pay cash fares.

All Line 2 stations except Chester connect to surface TTC bus or streetcar routes during regular operating hours. Some connections require proof-of-payment. Valid proof-of-payment includes paper transfers – free supplementary tickets obtained at the point of entering the transit system that allow the rider to transfer to another route on a one-way continuous direction with no stopovers or backtracking permitted – and Presto cards, which provide unlimited two-hour transfers in any direction across the TTC network.

== Service ==
=== Frequency ===
The frequency for this line is 2 to 3 minutes during peak periods and 4 to 5 minutes during off-peak periods.

The Route 300 Bloor–Danforth Blue Night Network bus provides late-night service to the area around the stations when the subway is not in operation. This service operates frequently along Bloor Street and Danforth Avenue between the East/West Mall and Kennedy station via Danforth Road, Brimley Road, Eglinton Avenue East, North/South Service Road, Transway Crescent and Kennedy Road. On Sundays, these routes operate through the early morning hours, because the subway starts service at 8:00 a.m. instead of the usual 6:00 a.m. Frequency is 6 to 30 minutes.

=== Capacity ===
As of 2016, Line 2 was running at capacity with almost 26,000 peak-hour riders. Upgraded signalling would allow for more frequent trains and expand peak-hour capacity to almost 33,000 riders by 2031.

In July 2026, the TTC awarded a contract to Hitachi Rail to install its SelTrac communications-based train control (CBTC) signalling system on Line 2. The new signalling system will replace the existing fixed-block signalling, allowing trains to operate at shorter headways while improving reliability and reducing signal-related delays. Design and engineering work is expected to continue through 2028, with installation occurring in phases and project completion scheduled for 2037.

== Rolling stock ==
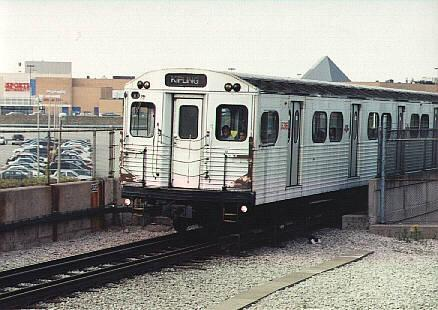
An M1-series subway train, one of the first trains to operate on the Bloor–Danforth line

The first trains to operate on Line 2 were the M1-series subway trains, which were among the first subway trains to be manufactured in Canada. At the time of construction, these subway cars were the longest in the world. As a result of camshaft propulsion controls, the increased speed provided by the M-series trains and the H-series trains allowed the Bloor–Danforth line to operate efficiently between Islington and Warden stations without the need for a larger subway fleet. As a result, the G-series subway trains were exclusively confined to the Yonge–University line. In the 1980s, as the H-series trains took over, the M-series trains were only used during rush hour as the trains were linked to be made up of vehicles of a single class. With the introduction of the T1-series subway trains (which had been used exclusively on the Yonge–University–Spadina line during their first years of service in the late 1990s), the M1-series trains were retired from service between 1998 and 1999.

Due to the opening of the Bloor–Danforth line and the additional services that were required, a new set of trains were purchased from the Hawker Siddeley group. These trains, which were a part of the H series, were similar to the M1-series trains with newer features such as electrically operated doors. With the introduction of the T1-series subway trains, the H1 and H2 trains were retired from service, while the remaining H4 trains (along with some earlier T1 series trains) were shifted to the Bloor–Danforth line.

Following the introduction of the Toronto Rocket subway trains on the Yonge–University and Sheppard lines in 2011 and 2016, respectively, all of the T1-series trains were transferred to the Bloor–Danforth line, where they replaced the remaining H4- and H6-series subway trains. The T1s are now the only trains operating on the line. The remaining H4 trains were retired from revenue service throughout the fall of 2011, and the last cars were decommissioned on January 27, 2012. They were the last version of TTC trains that were not equipped with air-conditioning systems (but instead used ceiling fans); they were also the last of which to be outfitted with larger orange upholstered bench seating and were mainly used on weekdays, most often during rush hour several years before their retirement. The H4s also had a similar interior design based on the H2 subway cars. The H6-series trains (which had bright orange doors and panels, individual seats, along with light brown floors, cream walls and brown simulated wood grain panels) were retired from service between 2013 and 2014; the final run for the last H6-series train took place on June 20, 2014. In mid-2016, a few Toronto Rocket trains were used on Line 2 because of an air conditioning malfunction in numerous individual T1 cars, combined with a hotter than average summer. This was after Toronto Mayor John Tory accepted a challenge posted on Twitter to ride an overheated T1 train on Line 2 during a hot summer day.

=== Refurbishment and replacement of the T1 fleet ===
The TTC estimated that the T1 fleet's useful life would end in 2026. In 2017, the TTC planned to replace the T1 fleet with 62 new trains, possibly using a successor of the Toronto Rocket type from Bombardier to eliminate the time needed to prototype a different model. However, in March 2019, the TTC reversed its decision and planned to delay the purchase of new train sets by refurbishing the T1 fleet to extend its life by a decade. The cost of refurbishment was estimated at $715 million, versus $1.86 billion required to replace the T1 fleet. Refurbishment would not include installing automatic train control (ATC) equipment on the T1 fleet, while new train sets would have included this feature, and this choice will thus delay the implementation of ATC on Line 2 by ten years. It was concurrently revealed the TTC lacked the facilities to store and maintain a new fleet at a new Kipling carhouse, which was originally planned to open in the mid-2020s, was now scheduled to open in 2031.

On August 6, 2020, the TTC issued a request for information (RFI) to gather information from potential suppliers to identify those who would be interested in designing and supplying new subway trains to the TTC. The RFI closed on September 18, 2020, and the TTC hosted an information session date on May 4, 2021, with potential suppliers to discuss the background, industry engagement, procurement model, and technical overview with interested manufacturers. The TTC later issued a request for proposal (RFP) on October 13, 2022, to the prequalified proponents to submit proposals for delivering the new trains. Prequalified rail vehicle manufacturers included Alstom Transport Canada, CRRC Qingdao Sifang, Hyundai Rotem, and Kawasaki Rail Car.

In July 2023, the TTC cancelled its request for proposals to supply new subway trains due to a lack of funding. Before the cancellation, the TTC had hoped to purchase 80 new trains, 55 for Line 2 to replace the T1 fleet and 25 for growth on Line 1 Yonge–University. The city pledged to pay one-third of the $2.5-billion estimated cost, but the provincial and federal governments had not committed to pay the remaining amount.

In November 2023, the province promised to contribute $758 million for the purchase of 55 new subway trains to replace Line 2's T1 fleet, provided that the federal government and the city each make a matching contribution. In November 2024, the federal government announced it would also contribute $758 million. In total, the new fleet of 55 trains would cost $2.3 billion. The TTC expects delivery of the new trains to start in 2030. The TTC has budgeted $163 million to keep the old T1 fleet operational until it is fully replaced.

On August 15, 2025, it was announced that the new trains will be built at the Alstom Thunder Bay plant in a single-sourced contract to keep most of the work in Canada. On January 15, 2026, the Government of Ontario signed a contract with Alstom to acquire an initial fleet of 55 trains. The government also increased the Canadian content to 55 percent.

=== Automatic train control ===
In July 2026, the TTC announced that Hitachi Rail Canada would install communications-based train control (CBTC) on Line 2 to replace the existing fixed-block technology. Hitachi Canada will install its SelTrac CBTC system, a form of automatic train control (ATC). Initial design for the CBTC project will begin in 2026 for completion by 2028. Implementation will be in stages, with final completion targeted for 2037.

=== Depot ===
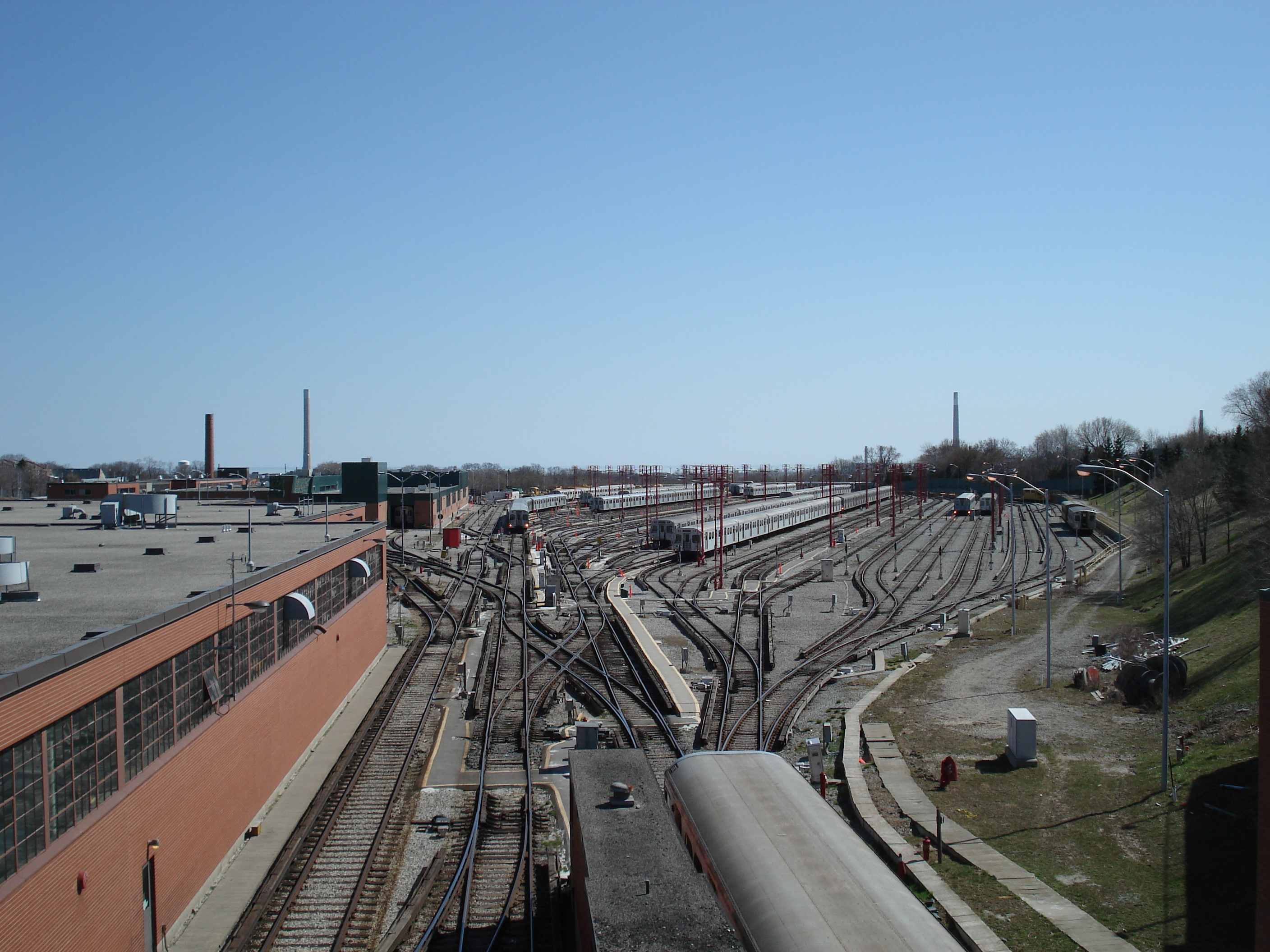
Greenwood Yard in 2009

Most trains that serve the Bloor–Danforth line are stored at the Greenwood Yard, which opened with the first segment of the line. Before the yard was built, the land was occupied by a quarry and a garbage dump. Due to its location next to the Canadian National Railway (and GO Transit Lakeshore East and Stouffville line) tracks, it was possible for trains to be delivered directly to the subway. The CN rail tracks were converted to allow for the storage of more subway trains as the T1-series trains were shifted from Yonge–University–Spadina line to the Bloor–Danforth line. In addition to providing storage for subway trains, the Greenwood Yard was also used to maintain vehicles that operated on Line 3 Scarborough during the line's operation from 1985 to 2023, as the McCowan Yard was only equipped for vehicle storage and to perform basic maintenance of vehicles.

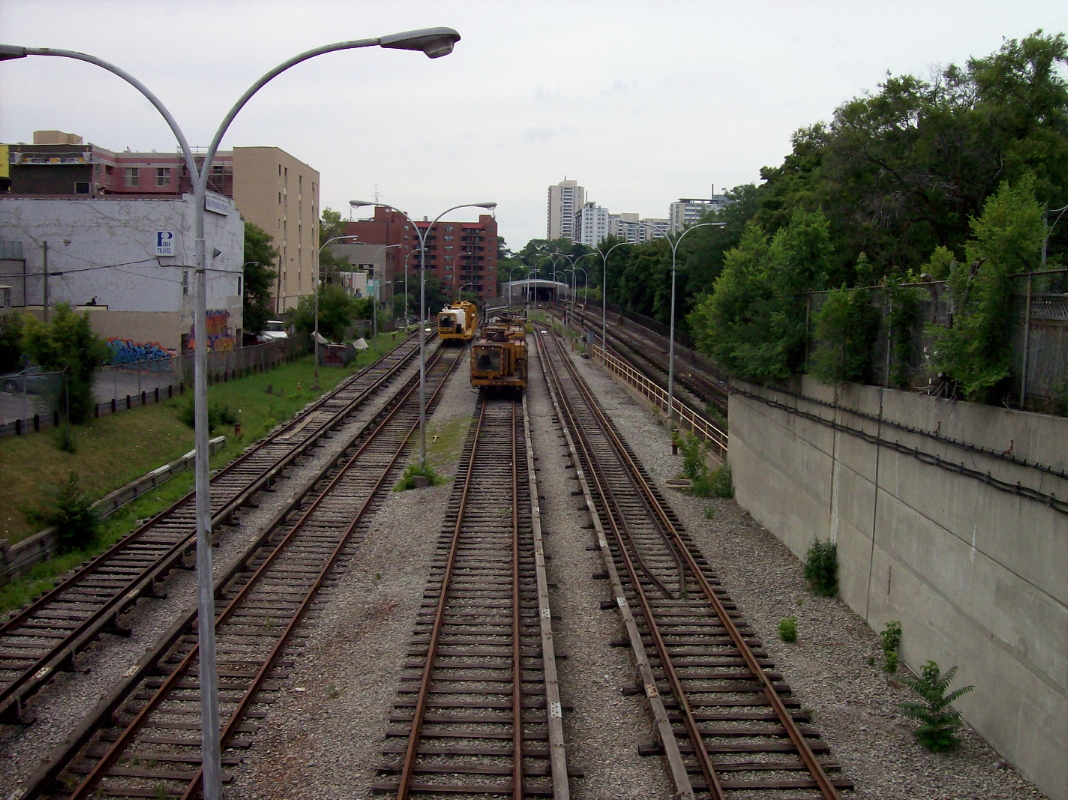
Keele Yard in 2007

The Keele Yard (originally known as the Vincent Yard) is a small facility located between Keele station and Dundas West station. It provides for the storage and cleaning of subway trains but not for maintenance. Since June 18, 2017, the yard stores and services four trains overnight with the remaining yard capacity used to store work equipment.

The TTC is planning to build a new subway yard on the site of a former Canadian Pacific Railway freight yard, Obico Yard, southwest of Kipling station. When the TTC replaces the T1 subway fleet, it will need space to store the new trains as they are delivered as well as new shops to service them. The Greenwood Yard will be inadequate as it is completely full with no room to expand, and because its facilities are optimized for two-car train sets rather than the six-car train sets of the proposed new fleet. The estimated cost of the new yard was $500 million, of which only $7 million for planning work was included in the Capital Budget as of July 2017. As of March 2017, the TTC estimated that the Kipling Yard would open in 2031.

== Expansion plans ==
=== Scarborough extension ===
The Scarborough subway extension (SSE) will replace Line 3 Scarborough with an eastward extension of Line 2.

Superimposed former Line 3 Scarborough (grey) and the under-construction Line 2 extension (dark green)

==== Earlier proposals ====
In 1983, there was discussion of a rapid transit extension from Kennedy station to Scarborough City Centre, initially proposed as a streetcar and later as a subway. The Scarborough RT (later Line 3 Scarborough) was built as a medium-capacity rail system instead. In 2005, Toronto City Council proposed again to extend the Bloor–Danforth line, though in 2006, this was altered when Scarborough councillors agreed to support plans to refurbish the existing line using other light-metro options.

In 2007, Mayor David Miller included the refurbishment of the Scarborough RT and extension to Sheppard Avenue using modern light rail transit as part of his Transit City plan. Construction would have required a shutdown of the line for its duration. During his 2010 mayoralty campaign, Rob Ford denounced the idea of light rail transit and instead proposed replacing the Scarborough RT with an extension of the Bloor–Danforth line. However, on March 31, 2011, Ford agreed with the provincial government that the province's Metrolinx agency would convert the Scarborough RT to light rail as part of the proposed Eglinton Crosstown line. In June 2012, the idea of a Scarborough subway extension was a key part of Toronto's proposed OneCity transit plan. This plan was later rejected by the provincial government and Ford.

==== Subway extension proposals ====
On September 4, 2013, the province of Ontario under Premier Kathleen Wynne announced that it would fund two-thirds of a 6.4 kilometres (4.0 mi) extension from Kennedy to Scarborough City Centre at Scarborough Centre station, with the federal government funding the remaining one-third. The subway route would extend eastward towards McCowan Road, via Eglinton Avenue and Danforth Road, and proceed north towards the intersection of McCowan Road and Sheppard Avenue, via Scarborough City Centre. There would be three new stations at Lawrence Avenue East (serving the Scarborough General Hospital), Scarborough Town Centre and Sheppard Avenue East. Tunnelling was expected to start in 2018, with completion within 5 years.

A subsequent city staff report indicated that the proposed stations at Lawrence Avenue and at Sheppard Avenue had "little development potential" nearby and were too close to planned SmartTrack stations. These two stops were eliminated in January 2016 in favour of a one-stop proposal terminating the line at Scarborough Town Centre. This revised plan would prevent the subway from competing for ridership with SmartTrack's branch to Markham and would reduce the cost from $3.5 billion to $2.5 billion.

City planning staff estimated the peak ridership of the one-stop extension to be 7,300 in the peak hour and peak direction, below the 9,500 to 14,000 of the three-stop extension without consideration of SmartTrack, and about half of the 15,000 peak ridership considered the low end to justify a subway. However, Mayor John Tory noted this number was greater than the ridership at Kipling station. In June 2016, the estimated cost of the one-stop SSE increased by $900 million because tunnels needed to be deeper than expected and needed more concrete in some places. An additional $300 million would be needed to continue operating Line 3 Scarborough. Construction of a large bus terminal further increased the total cost to $3.35 billion.

In March 2017, city staff estimated the extension would take six years to construct with an expected opening in the second quarter of 2026 and City Council approved the extension's design. The project was funded.

In May 2018, Rob Ford's brother Doug Ford – during his campaign to become premier of Ontario – pledged to work on and pay for the three-stop proposal. Despite Ford's election as premier, the TTC was still focused on building the one-stop proposal.

On April 10, 2019, Doug Ford, who had since become premier, announced that the province would revert the extension back to the three-stop proposal at an estimated cost of $5.5 billion with an estimated completion date between 2029 and 2030. The station locations were the same as the prior three-stop proposal. In February 2020, Metrolinx released a cost–benefit analysis showing that the $5.5-billion project cost for the three-stop extension is double the estimated benefits of $2.8 billion over 60 years. Benefits included reducing travel time and cars on the road. Metrolinx CEO Phil Verster said the estimate of benefits was conservative and Metrolinx may be able to improve the benefits over time. By 2025, the estimated cost of the extension had grown to $10.2 billion.

==== Construction ====
On March 10, 2020, Metrolinx and Infrastructure Ontario issued a request for qualifications (RFQ) related to advance tunnelling works. Strabag was selected in May 2021. The scope of the advance tunnel contract included tunnelling works, building launch shafts and station and emergency exit building headways, supply of tunnel boring machines, and other necessary activities before tunnel construction.

Construction on the extension began on June 23, 2021. The SSE tunnel will contain two tracks within a single bore of 10.7 metres (35 ft) in diameter and will be the largest subway tunnel by diameter in Toronto. The tunnel boring machine (TBM) was built by Herrenknecht in Schwanau, Germany. Arriving in early 2022, the TBM was transported via sea in multiple shipments for reassembly at the launch site. By January 2023, the TBM (named "Diggy Scardust" after Ziggy Stardust, musician David Bowie's stage persona and fictional character) had started digging at a speed of 10–15 metres (33–49 ft) per day. It will dig 6.9 kilometres (4.3 mi) of the 7.8-kilometre (4.8 mi) tunnel.

The stations, rails and systems (SRS) contract will be delivered using a progressive design–build delivery strategy. In September 2021, Metrolinx and Infrastructure Ontario released an RFQ to shortlist potential bidders. In November 2022, Metrolinx selected Scarborough Transit Connect (Aecon, FCC Construcción, and Mott MacDonald). This contract includes all remaining tunnelling work, construction of stations, emergency exits, and transit connections, and operating systems for the extension.

In May 2026, internal TTC documents obtained by the Toronto Star through a freedom-of-information request indicated that TTC staff were using an internal planning date of 2033 for the opening of the Scarborough subway extension, despite the project's public opening date remaining 2030. According to the article, the delay was linked in part to technical challenges encountered by the tunnel boring machine during excavation work, as well as rising construction costs.

=== West to Mississauga ===
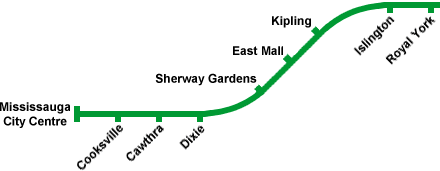
Proposed western extension towards Mississauga City Centre

The TTC's Rapid Transit Expansion Study, published in 2001, identified three possible western extensions to the line. The first was a 3.2-kilometre (2.0 mi) link to Sherway Gardens, with a station added at the East Mall to serve Cloverdale Mall at a later date. The second included an additional 1.4 kilometres (0.87 mi) from Sherway Gardens to Dixie Road in Mississauga, while a further section from Dixie Road to Mississauga City Centre and Square One Shopping Centre, which included three stations, was considered but rejected due to cost and planning considerations. This was replaced by a planned Dundas LRT run by MiWay going from Kipling station to Hurontario Street, linking to the Hurontario LRT as part of the MoveOntario 2020 transit plan. This plan was revived – along with the Jane LRT, the Finch West LRT extensions, the Waterfront LRTs, and others – by the Feeling Congested? report by the City of Toronto in 2013, as an "unfunded future rapid transit project".
