= Chester station (Toronto) =

Toronto subway station

Chester
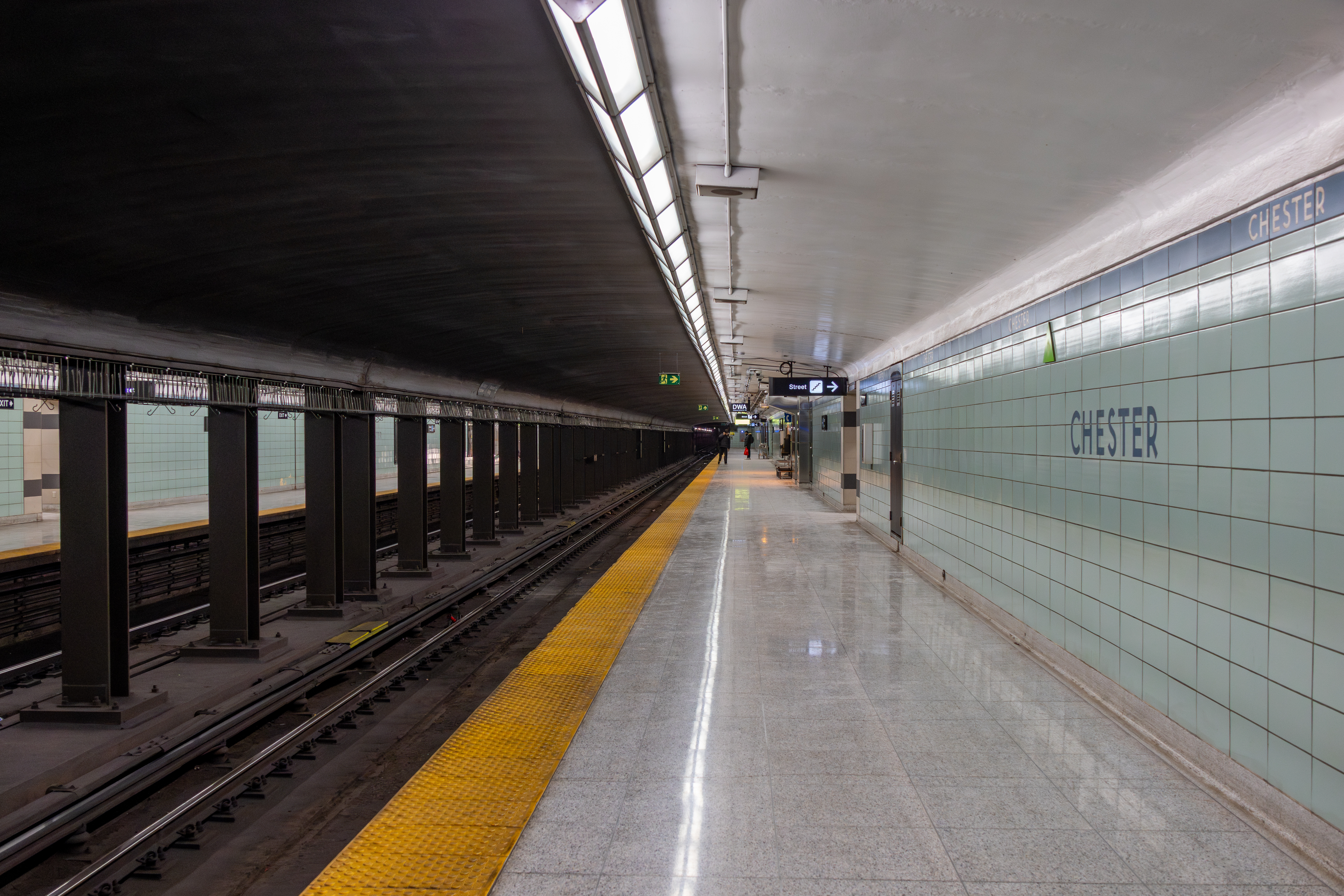

General information
- Location: 22 Chester Avenue; Toronto, Ontario; Canada
- Coordinates: 43°40′42″N 79°21′09″W
- Platforms: Side platforms
- Tracks: 2
- Connections: TTC buses: 300 Bloor - Danforth

Construction
- Structure type: Underground
- Cycle facilities: bike racks
- Accessible: Yes

Other information
- Website: Official station page

History
- Opened: February 26, 1966; 60 years ago

Passengers
- 2023–2024: 6,197
- Rank: 63 of 70

Services
Preceding station	Toronto Transit Commission	Following station
Broadview towards Kipling	Line 2 Bloor–Danforth	Pape towards Kennedy
Location

Chester is a subway station on Line 2 Bloor–Danforth in Toronto, Ontario, Canada. The station is located on Chester Avenue just north of Danforth Avenue. It opened in 1966 as one of the original stations of this subway line.

== Facilities ==
Following the design style set by the stations of the Bloor–Danforth line, Chester station uses a two-colour theme with the station's name in the Toronto Subway font. In keeping with the style, Chester's blue trim tiles and light green main tiles complement the original tile colours of Lansdowne and Dufferin, respectively. The station has side platforms with two tracks serving the station, each with an elevator between platform level and street level at the existing entrance. Chester station has two entrances, both located on Chester Avenue just north of Danforth Avenue but on opposite sides of the street. A walkway leads to the station from a nearby street to allow access to the station from the west side. The Toronto Parking Authority operates a public parking lot across Chester Avenue opposite the subway entrance.

By 2021, the TTC had installed the artwork titled FLORAE by artist Katharine Harvey. The artwork is inspired by native plants and flowers of the area and consists of a series of wall mosaics and art glass elements. These were installed over the front entrance and by each of the two elevators. The station art is part of the TTC Public Art Program announced in June 2017.

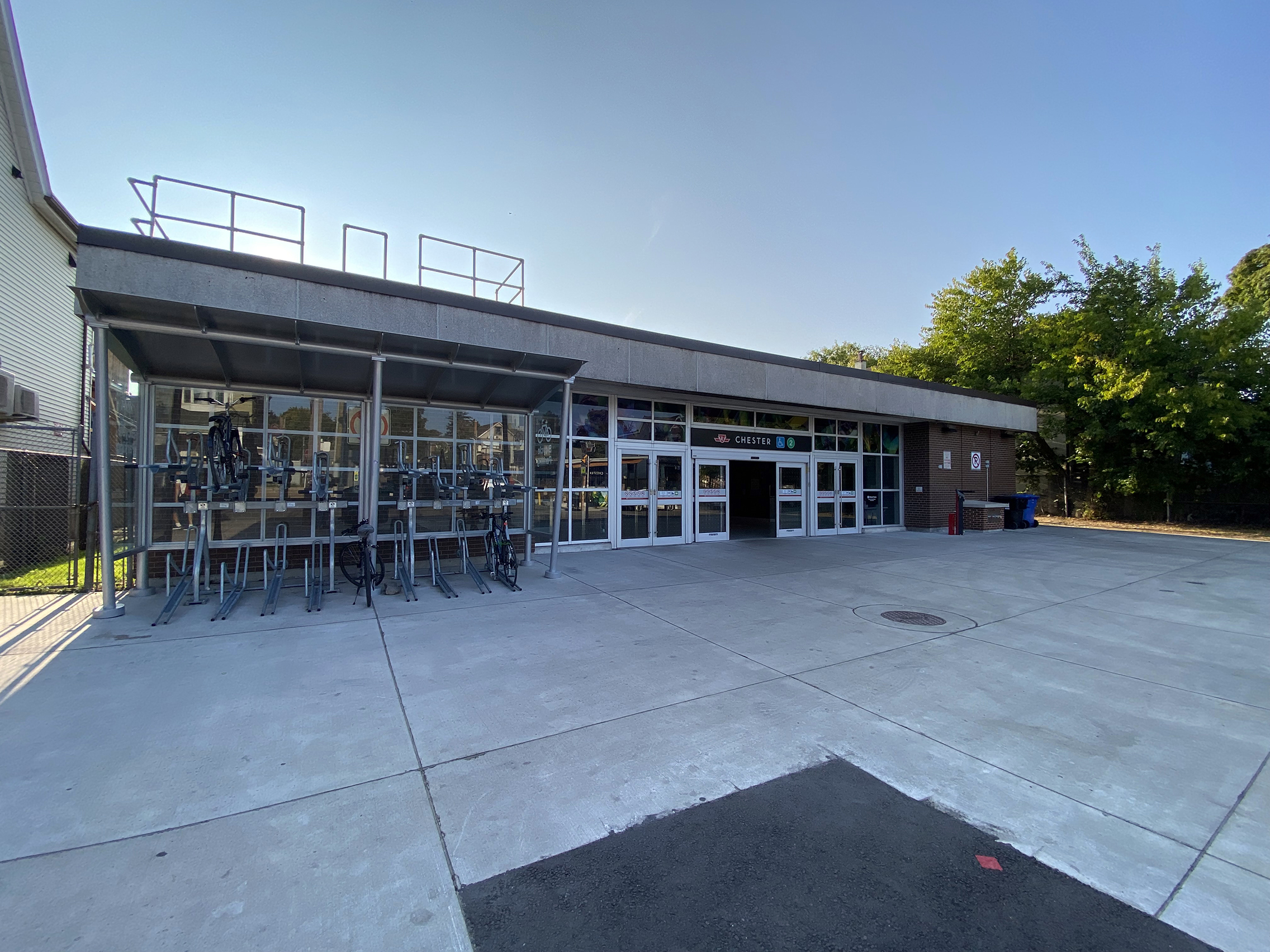
Station exterior

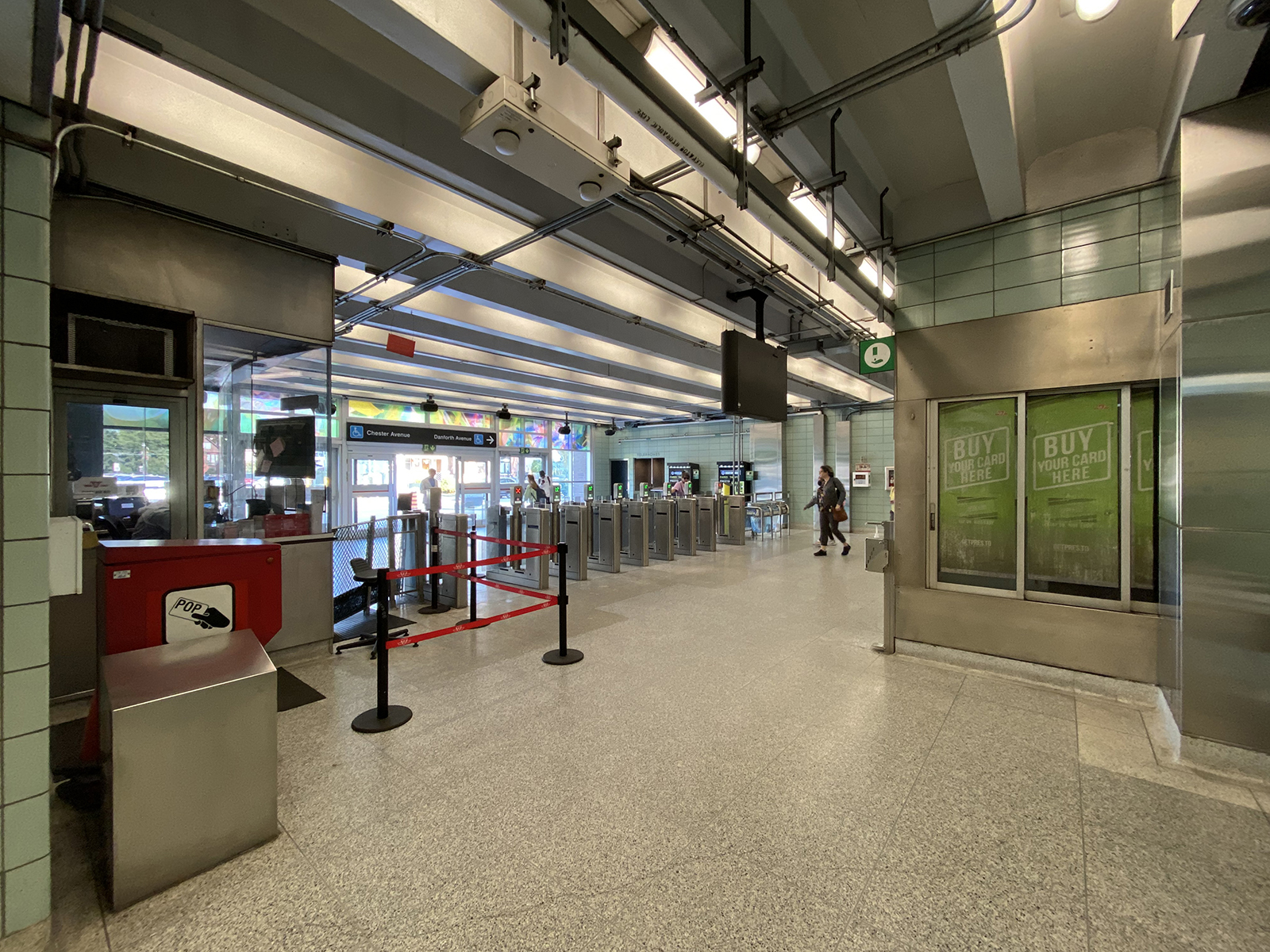
Station concourse

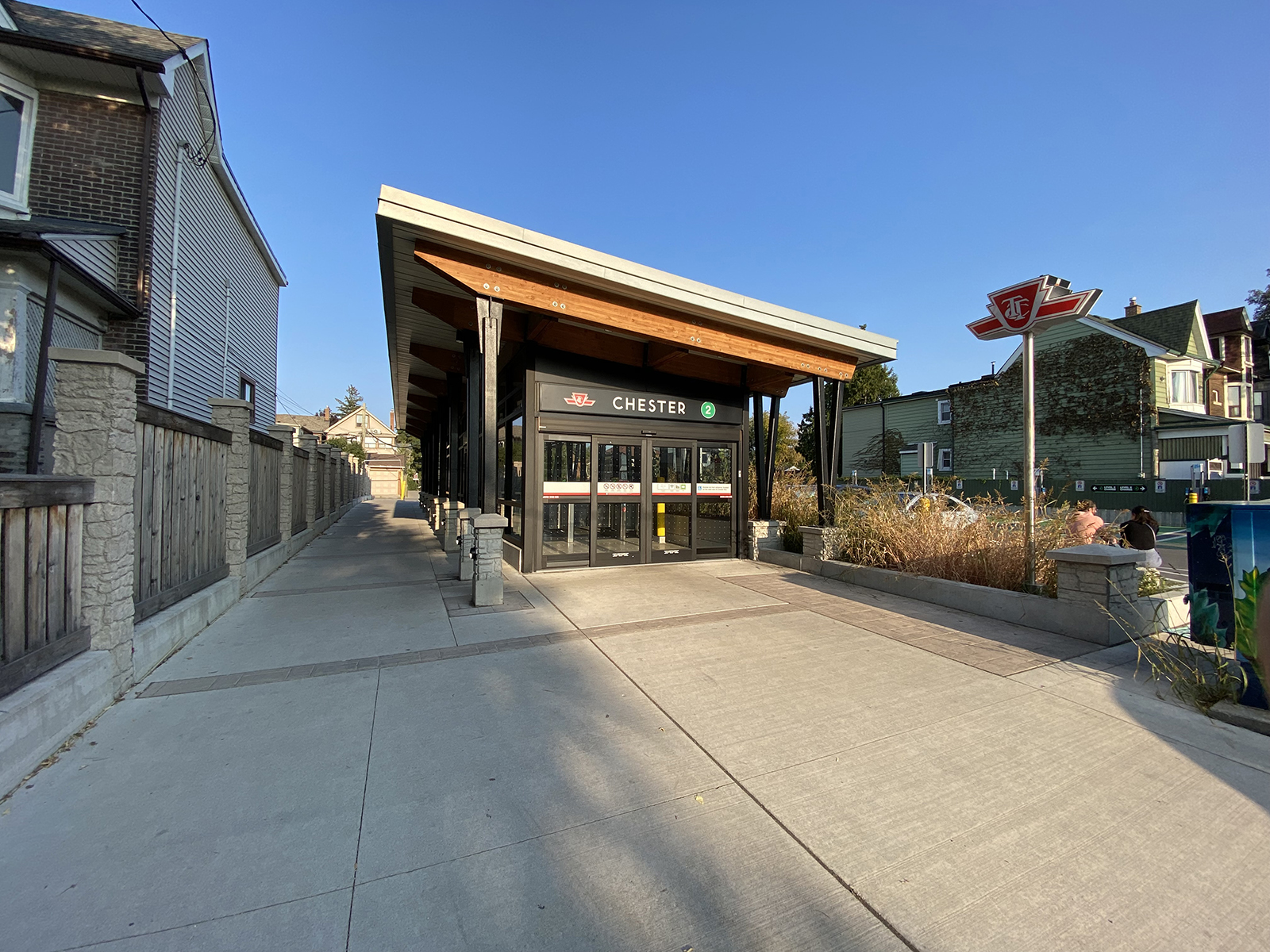
New entrance opened on April 23, 2021

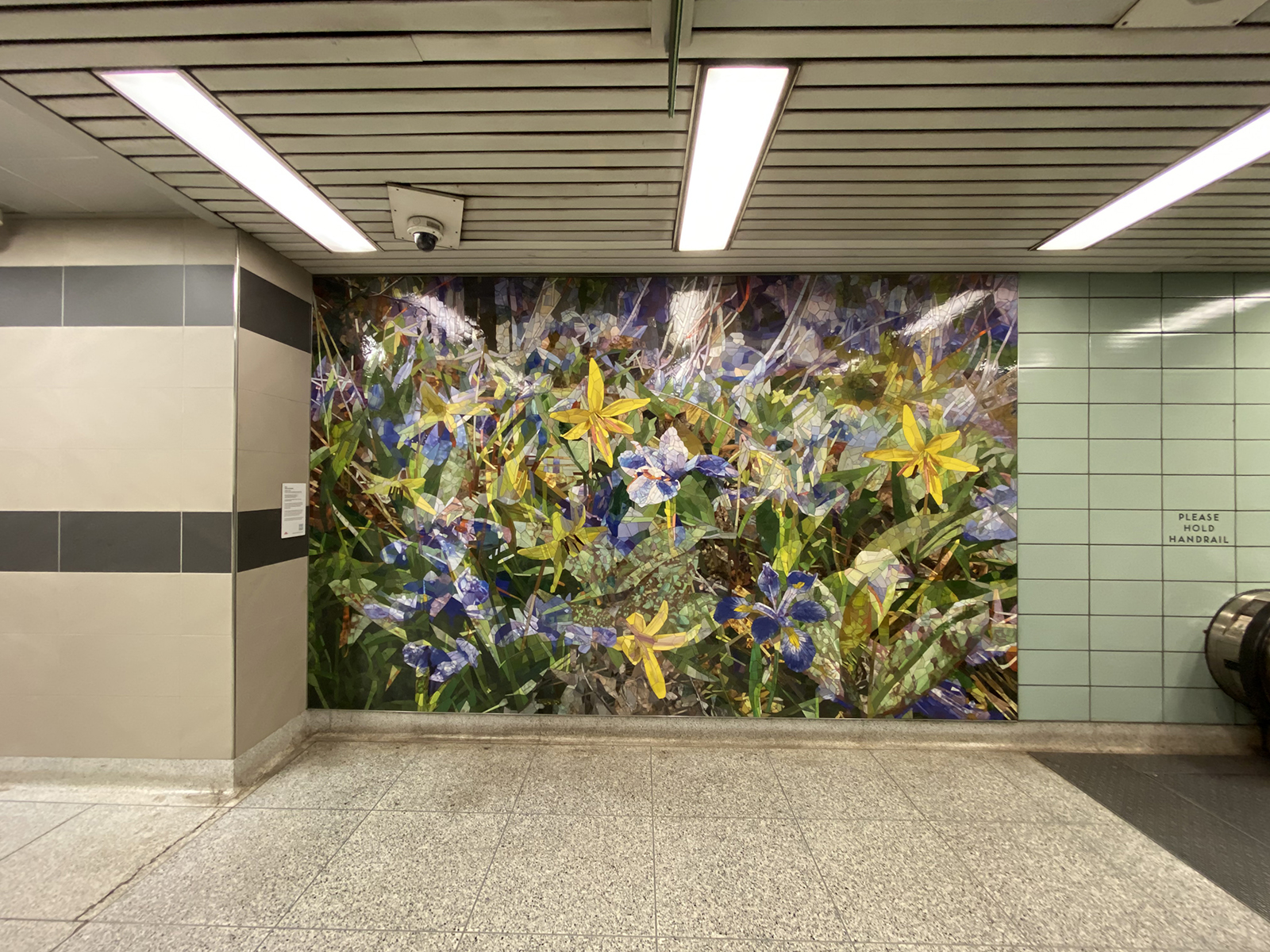
Artwork titled FLORAE by artist Katharine Harvey completed in 2021

== Communities served ==
The nearby communities that are served by this station include Greektown, Withrow Park, Riverdale, and Broadview North. In addition to serving these communities, Chester station is commonly used to access local street festivals such as the Taste of the Danforth.

== History ==
Chester station was opened on February 26, 1966, along with the rest of the first phase of the Bloor–Danforth line which operated initially between Keele and Woodbine stations.

The Gateway Newsstand kiosk at the station, which had been vacant for over six years, was reopened on May 8, 2015, as "the Artist Newsstand" by a group of local artists led by Jess Dobkin. Along with the usual offerings of newspapers, magazines and drinks, the Artist Newsstand is a performance and gallery space for artists and was staffed by artists as a way of funding their work. A $4,000 Kickstarter campaign was launched to fund the renovation of the kiosk, with the campaign successfully raising $4,931. The Artist Newsstand operated in the space for one year.

Although the station's need for a second exit was rated as a high priority in 2004, Chester was the last station left on the east end of Line 2 Bloor–Danforth where design work and consultation on the addition of a second exit had not started. In May 2014, a list of 15 potential second-exit sites was developed. In June 2016, the location of the second exit was announced, situated at the west side of the parking lot across the street from the main entrance. The construction of two elevators and the second exit started in 2018, and the elevators opened on September 2, 2020; the second exit opened on April 23, 2021. As part of the accessibility upgrades, the station was closed for two weeks in June 2020.

== Surface connections ==
Chester station is not served by TTC buses during the day. When the subway is not in operation, the station is served by the 300 Bloor–Danforth night bus.

Route	Name	Additional information
300A	Bloor–Danforth	Eastbound to Warden; westbound to Pearson Airport (On-street transfer)
300B	Bloor–Danforth	Eastbound to Kennedy station; westbound to West Mall (On-street transfer)
