= Keele Yard =

Coordinates: 43.65636°N 79.45527°W

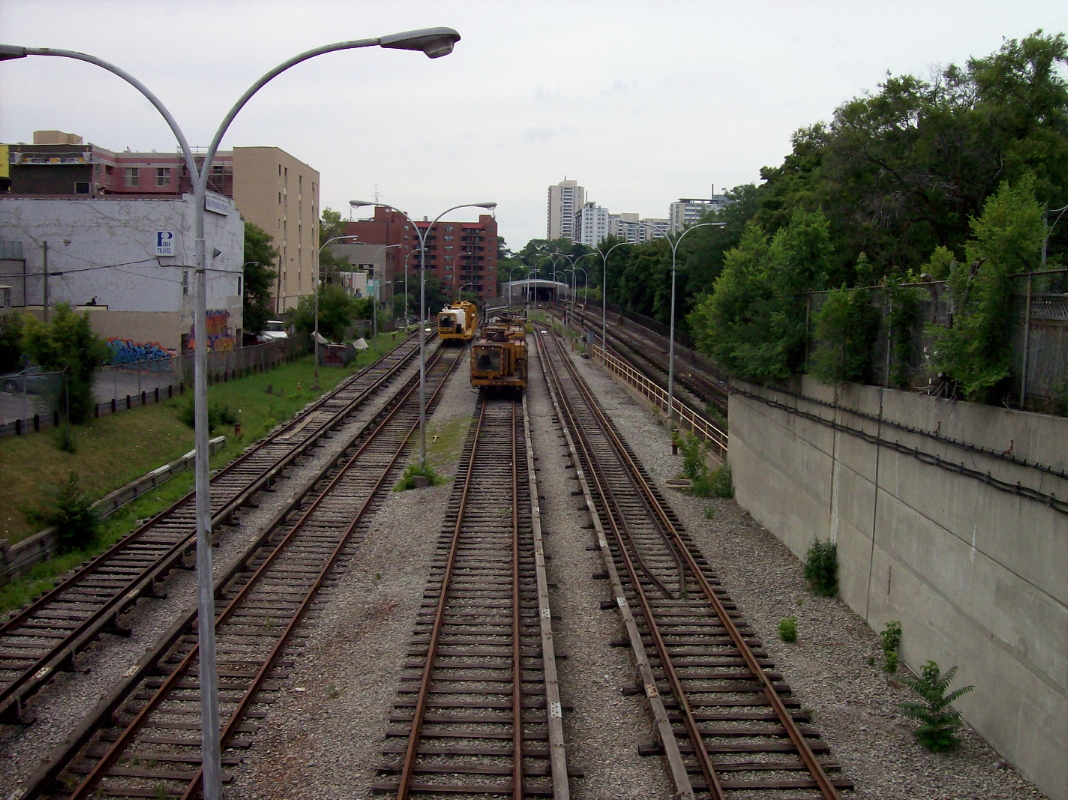
- Keele Yard looking west in 2007

Overview
- Locale: High Park North, Toronto

Service
- System: Toronto subway
- Operator: Toronto Transit Commission

History
- Opened: 1966

Technical
- Track gauge: 4 ft 10 7/8 in (1,495 mm)
- Electrification: Third rail, 600 V DC

Keele Yard (originally known as Vincent Yard) is a rail yard on the Toronto Transit Commission's (TTC's) Line 2 Bloor–Danforth of the Toronto subway system. Keele Yard is located between Dundas West and Keele stations.

== Description ==
The yard consists of four tracks each long enough to hold two six-car trains. Each track enters an underground carhouse at the east end of the yard providing interior storage for half of the yard's eight train capacity. There is a locked passage for TTC staff between the carhouse and Dundas West Station. The tracks of the Keele Yards join the mainline about 80 metres (260 ft) east of Keele Station near Indian Road. There is a double crossover between Keele Station and the Keele Yard junction.

Since the Keele Yard's 2017 re-opening, most activity occurs in the late evenings and early mornings. Four trains plus some work cars use the yard. Each night, subway workcars typically leave the Keele Yard before 2 a.m. when the four passenger trains start to arrive. At night, the trains are tested and prepared for morning service with some system check tests occurring on the outdoor storage tracks. Workcars will return to the yard before 5:45 a.m. at which time the passenger trains start to go into morning service. The first westbound train is scheduled to go past the Keele Yard at about 6:00 a.m. The number of work cars using the yard will vary depending on work scheduled at the west end of Line 2.

== History ==
Keele Yard was originally named Vincent Yard after Vincent Street, a short street that used to run east from Dundas Street, north of Bloor Street. The Dundas streetcars turned around at Vincent until the construction of Dundas West station. The street has since been replaced with The Crossways apartment building complex.

Opened in 1966, the yard historically supplemented Greenwood Yard and stored trains for Line 2 Bloor–Danforth and Line 1 Yonge–University subways. The trains would be given some minor maintenance and have their interiors cleaned. This continued until the late 1970s when Wilson Yard was opened and all excess trains could be stored there. From that point, until 2013, it was used to store work vehicles and retired subway cars. It was also used for track maintenance training. Keele Yard fell into poor condition after years of inactivity.

In August 2014, the TTC began rehabilitation work to place it back in service. On June 18, 2017, the TTC reopened the yard to store and service four trains overnight. The remaining yard capacity is used to store work equipment. By reopening the Keele Yard, the TTC eliminates the deadheading of trains between Keele Station and the Greenwood Yard, and can put trains more efficiently into service at the west end of Line 2. Also, the yard provides extra storage space which became useful when all T1 subway cars were moved from Line 1 Yonge–University to Line 2 with the introduction of TR trains on Line 1.

After a derailment on January 22, 2020, the Keele Yard was temporarily shut down until its rails could be inspected for defects. A train leaving the yard partly derailed and fouled the mainline forcing a shutdown of a portion of line 2 for 4 hours during the morning rush hours. The cause was a rail in the yard with a small protrusion which lifted a wheel on the fourth car of a subway train. The protrusion was about 1.25 cm (0.49 in) thick and 20–23 cm (7.9–9.1 in) long, and located on the inside of the rail. In addition, since 2015, the defective track had been missing a "kick plate", a custom-made item, which would have guided the wheel. Also, a TTC roadmaster (who does track inspections) found that the switch was not properly fastened with braces to the track bed; the braces were either missing or improperly installed.
