= Coxwell station =

Toronto subway station

Coxwell
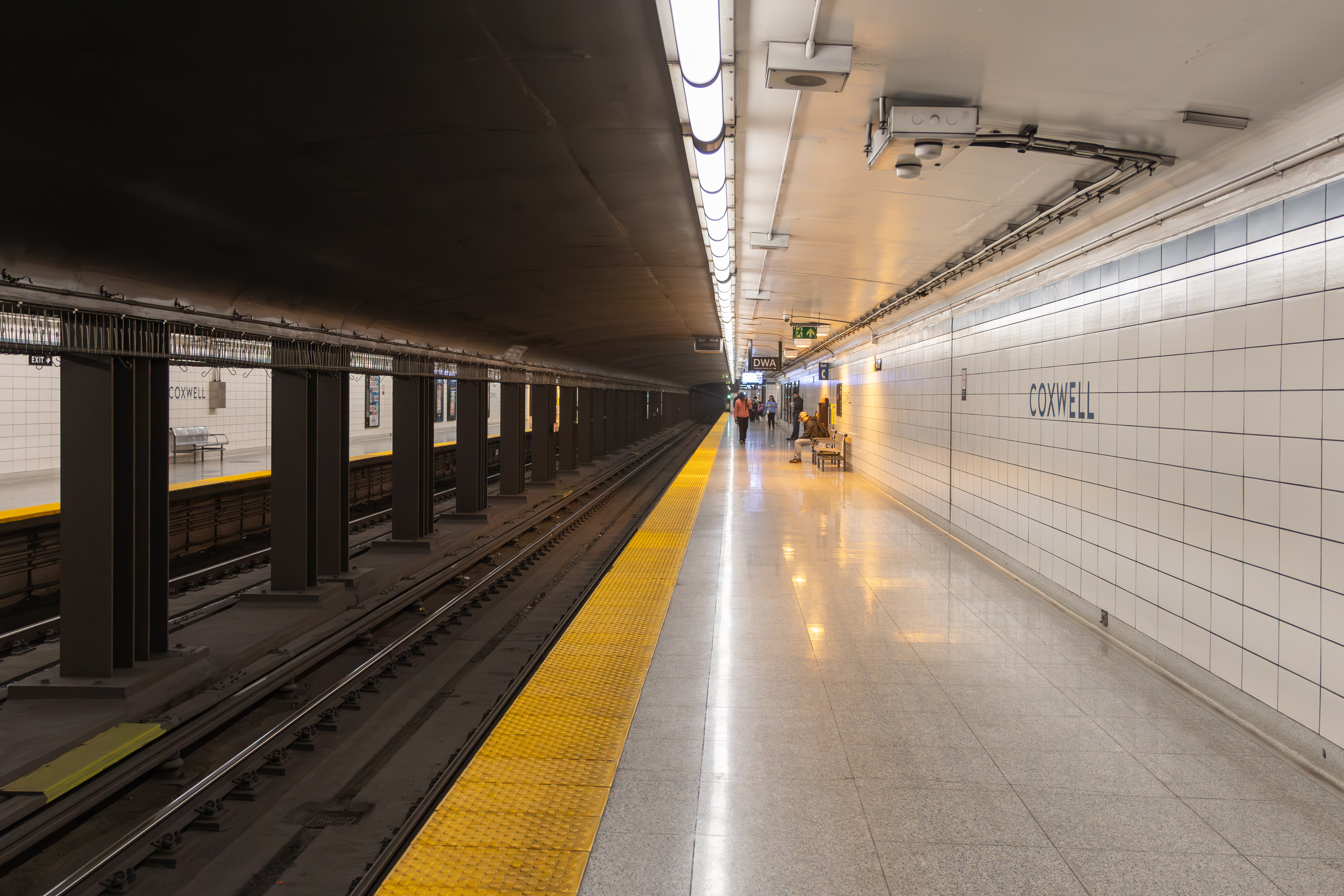
- Westbound platform

General information
- Location: 355 Strathmore Boulevard; Toronto, Ontario; Canada
- Coordinates: 43°41′03″N 79°19′23″W
- Platforms: Side platforms
- Tracks: 2
- Connections: TTC buses: 22 Coxwell; 70 O'Connor; 300 Bloor - Danforth; 322 Coxwell; 404 East York Community Bus

Construction
- Structure type: Underground
- Accessible: Yes

Other information
- Website: Official station page

History
- Opened: February 26, 1966; 60 years ago

Passengers
- 2023–2024: 13,450
- Rank: 51 of 70

Services
| Preceding station | Toronto Transit Commission | Following station |
|---|---|---|
| Greenwood towards Kipling | Line 2 Bloor–Danforth | Woodbine towards Kennedy |
Location

Coxwell is a Toronto subway station on Line 2 Bloor–Danforth in Toronto, Ontario, Canada. It is located on Strathmore Boulevard just east of Coxwell Avenue and one block north of Danforth Avenue. It opened in 1966 as part of the original segment of the Bloor–Danforth line. Automatic sliding doors, accessible fare gates and the addition of elevators made the station fully accessible in late December 2017.

== Description ==
The entrance, collector's booth, fare gates, and bus bays are at street level, the concourse is on the second level, and the subway platforms are on the lower level. Stairs connect all levels with escalators only operating up at all times. The station building has four bus bays.

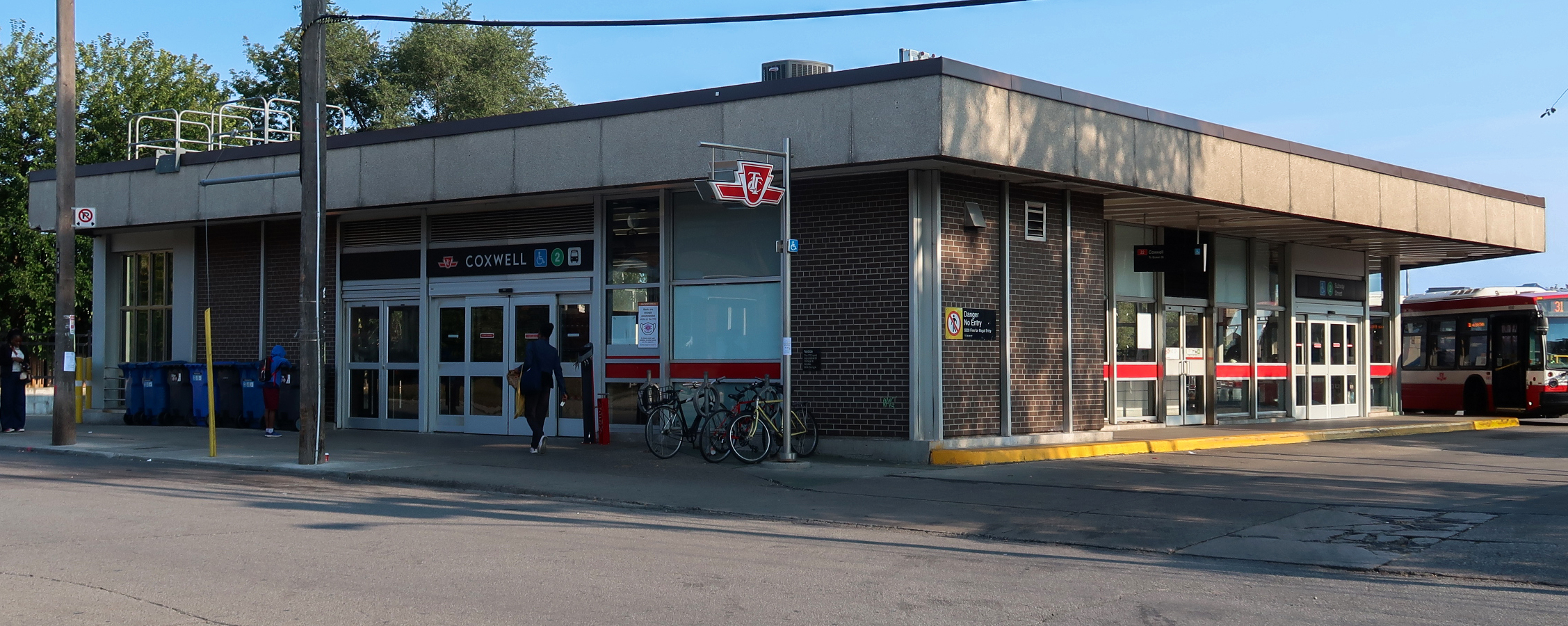
Coxwell station exterior in 2023

This station is used as a switchover point for subway operators changing their shift, regularly causing a slight delay while the crew is changed in either direction. Station collectors and subway operators use office space at the Danforth Garage, which is located on the south side of Danforth Avenue near the station.

The station underwent renovations to add elevators from the street to both subway platforms, automatic sliding doors, accessible fare gates, and improved signage, which made it fully accessible by 2017. This is part of a system-wide program that will retrofit all stations by 2030.

On December 22, 2016, this station and Leslie were the last subway stations to be equipped with Presto card readers.

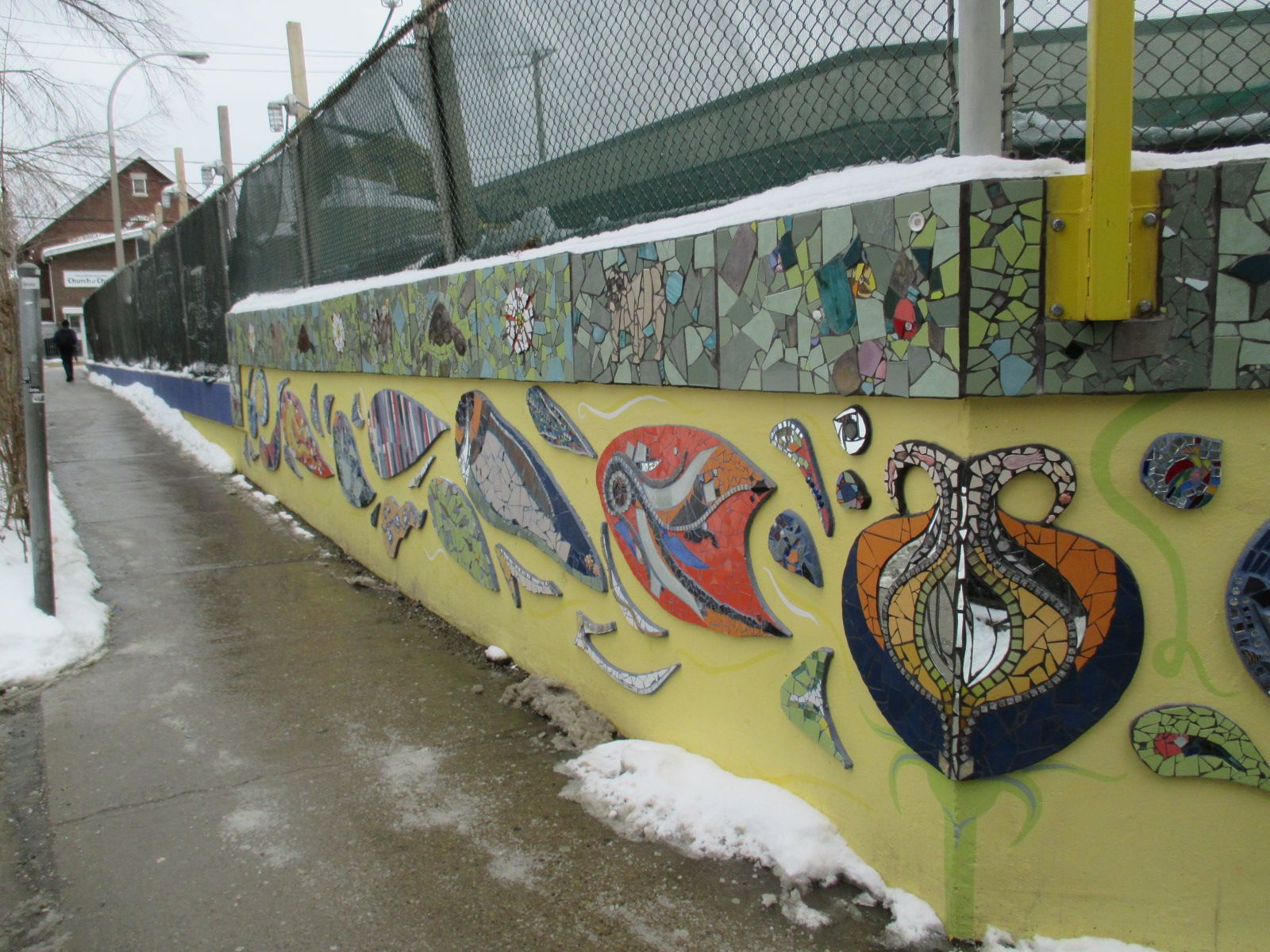
Coxwell Laneway Mosaic Mural bordering bus loop

In October 2016, the Coxwell Laneway Mosaic Mural was unveiled by dignitaries, including TTC Chair Josh Colle, who said, "At the TTC, public art not only beautifies our properties, but it's become a catalyst for station improvement projects." The mural is mounted on the outside of the barrier separating the Coxwell Station bus loop from a pedestrian walkway on the east and a parking lot on the south. The work is divided in two sections, representing past and future. It was created by a local group led by artist Cristina Delago.

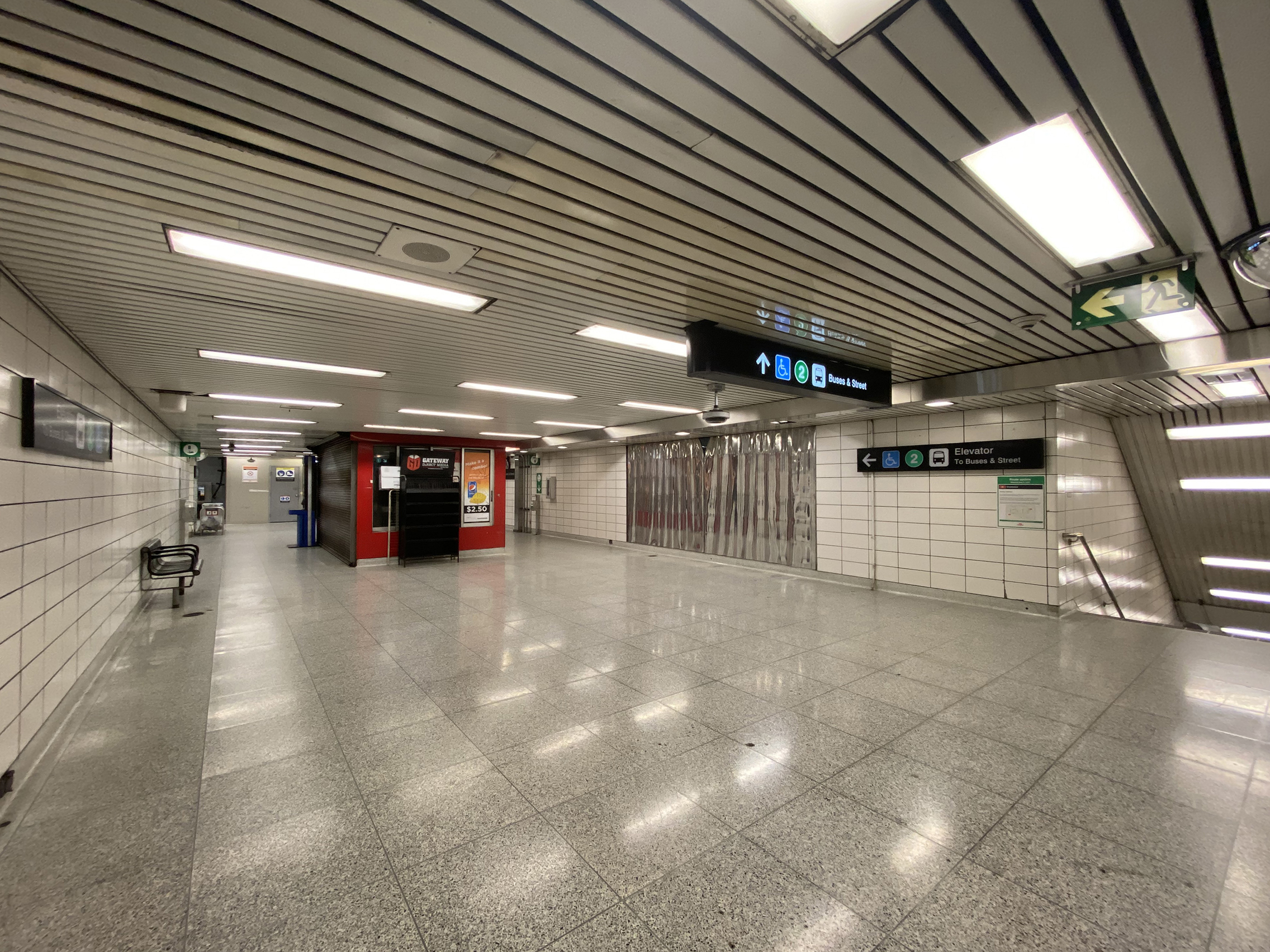
Artwork Forwards and Backwards in concourse level

Installed in 2018, the artwork Forwards and Backwards by Jennifer Davis and Jon Sasaki is displayed on the station concourse level, giving the effect of a funhouse mirror. Davis describes the work as "a three-dimensional sculpted curtain, cast in polished reflective aluminum, a material widely used in the TTC's rolling stock and infrastructure". The "sculpted curtain" is intended as a tribute to the TTC's "behind-the-curtain" employees.

A laneway connects the station to Danforth and runs by the former Hollinger Bus Lines terminal, which is now a restaurant.

== Ridership ==
The ridership at Coxwell station has been relatively stable since 2007, with a peak ridership of 17,900 in 2008 and the lowest ridership in 2015 with 15,260 riders.

Coxwell station ridership
| Year | Pop. | ±% p.a. |
|---|---|---|
| 2007 | 16,590 | — |
| 2008 | 17,900 | +7.90% |
| 2009 | 16,700 | −6.70% |
| 2010 | 15,620 | −6.47% |
| 2011 | 16,670 | +6.72% |
| 2012 | 16,730 | +0.36% |
| 2013 | 17,660 | +5.56% |
| 2014 | 16,980 | −3.85% |
| 2015 | 15,260 | −10.13% |
| 2016 | 15,620 | +2.36% |
| 2018 | 15,480 | −0.45% |

== Nearby landmarks ==
Nearby landmarks include Monarch Park Stadium, Monarch Park Collegiate Institute, Michael Garron Hospital and the East York Civic Centre.

== Surface connections ==
TTC routes serving the station include:

| Bay number | Route | Name | Additional information |
|---|---|---|---|
| 1 | 70 | O'Connor | Eastbound to O'Connor station |
| 2 | 404 | East York | Community bus |
| 3 | Wheel-Trans | | |
| 4 | 22 | Coxwell | Southbound to Queen Street East |
| N/A | 322 | Coxwell | Blue Night service; northbound to Broadview station via Cosburn Avenue and southbound to the Bingham Loop via Kingston Road |
