= Greenwood station (Toronto) =

Toronto subway station

Greenwood
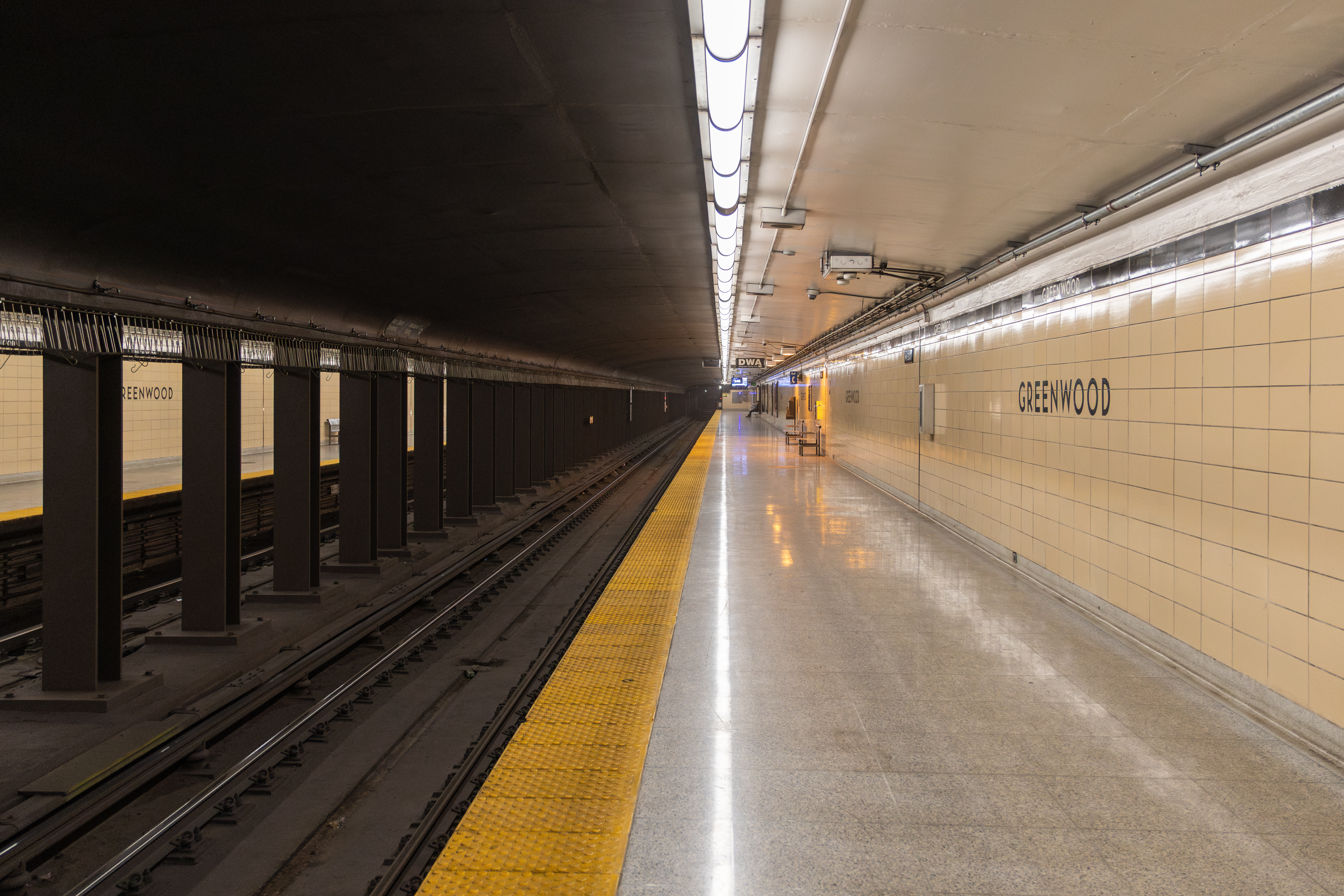
- Westbound platform

General information
- Location: 10 Linnsmore Crescent, Toronto, Ontario; Canada
- Coordinates: 43°40′57″N 79°19′49″W
- Platforms: Side platforms
- Tracks: 2
- Connections: TTC buses: 31 Greenwood; 300 Bloor - Danforth

Construction
- Structure type: Underground
- Accessible: Yes

Other information
- Website: Official station page

History
- Opened: 26 February 1966; 60 years ago

Passengers
- 2023–2024: 9,567
- Rank: 57 of 70

Services
Preceding station	Toronto Transit Commission	Following station
Donlands towards Kipling	Line 2 Bloor–Danforth	Coxwell towards Kennedy
Location

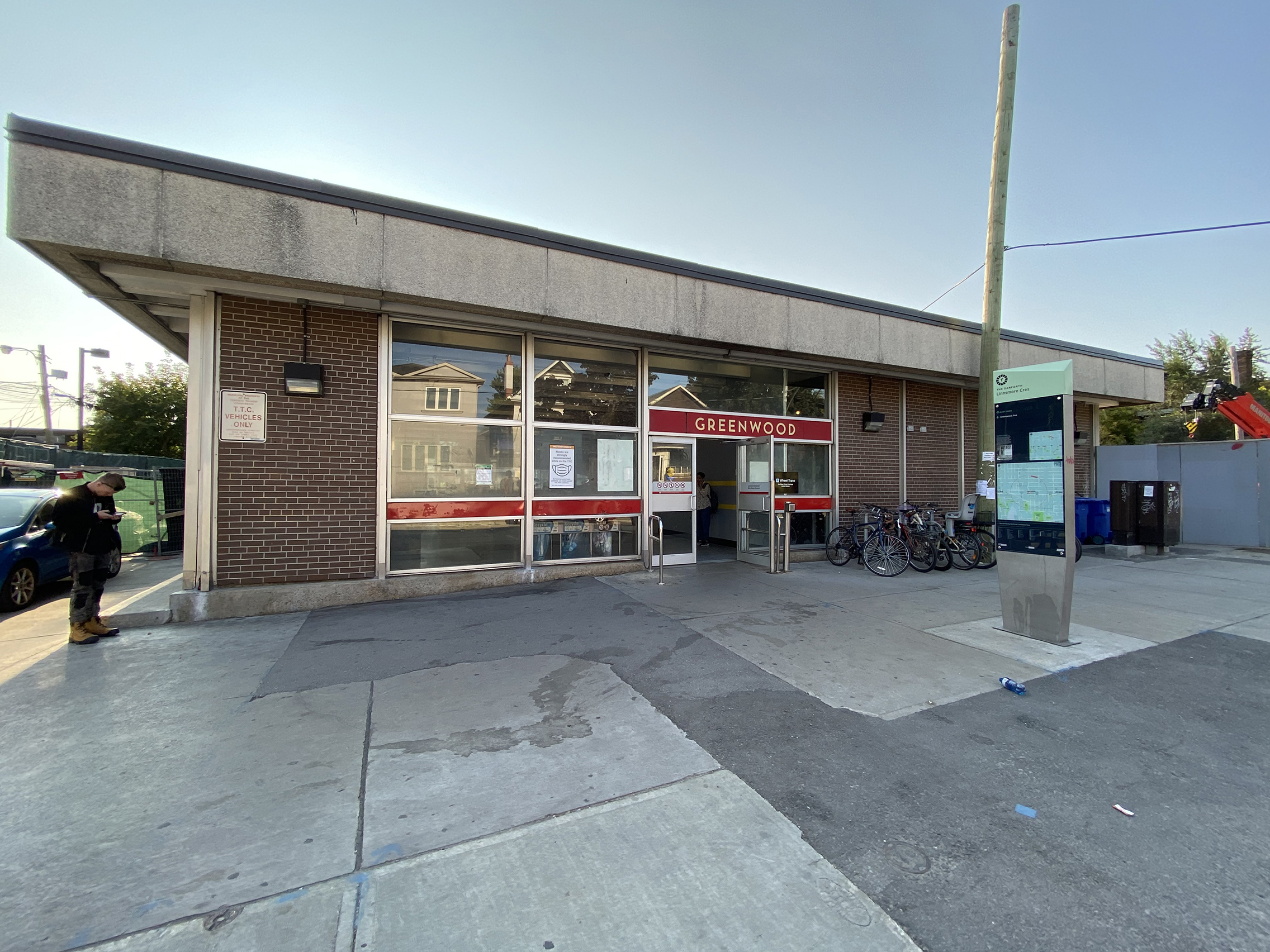
Exterior of the station

Greenwood is a Toronto subway station on Line 2 Bloor–Danforth in Toronto, Ontario, Canada. It is located at the southwest corner of Linnsmore Crescent and Strathmore Boulevard just north of Danforth Avenue.

The entrance, collector's booth and bus bays are at street level, with stairs and escalators to a lower concourse level which provides a passage between the platforms on the level below. The station building has two bus bays, and its bus terminal is located within the fare-paid area; but prior to renovations in 1993, the terminal was located outside of the fare-paid area. Single escalators operate in an up direction at all times.

Greenwood opened in 1966 as part of the original segment of the Bloor–Danforth line. It is one block east of Greenwood Avenue, the closest major intersection, after which it is named.

== Station access upgrades ==
Construction to make the station's main entrance wheelchair accessible by adding two elevators had begun by the fourth quarter of 2021. One elevator links the street level to the concourse level and the eastbound platform; the other elevator links the concourse and the westbound platform. Construction was completed in February 2026, and the station was declared accessible.

== Subway infrastructure in the vicinity ==
Between Donlands and Greenwood stations is a full, grade-separated, double-track, underground wye junction, allowing trains from either direction to enter and exit Greenwood Subway Yard via the Greenwood Portal. The yard is located at ground level on the west side of Greenwood Avenue, south of Danforth Avenue and north of Gerrard Street East.

== Nearby landmarks ==
Nearby landmarks include St. Patrick's Catholic Secondary School, Monarch Park Collegiate Institute and Danforth Collegiate and Technical Institute.

== Surface connections ==
The station's bus platform is not within the fare-paid area. Bus routes serving the station include:

Bay number	Route	Name	Additional information
1	Wheel-Trans		
2	31	Greenwood	Southbound to Queen Street East and Eastern Avenue

== Second exit ==
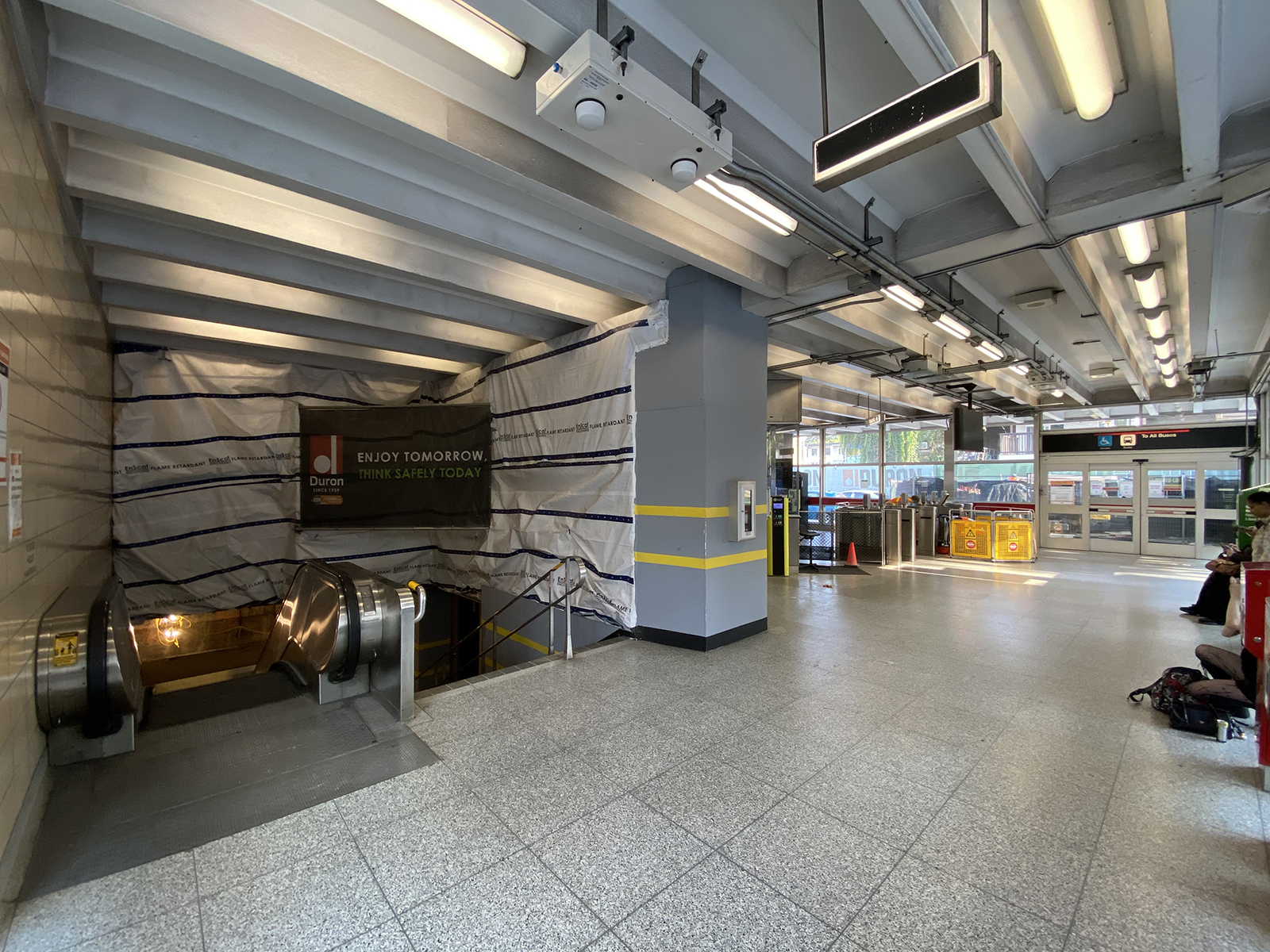
Concourse under renovation in 2023

In July 2010 the TTC announced plans to add second exits to two subway stations on Line 2 Bloor–Danforth. These exits were recommended after a fire safety audit due to the stations only having one primary means of emergency access and egress.

The planned construction would see a new exit-only structure built at surface level on Strathmore Boulevard. In order to build the exits, the TTC planned to expropriate residential land and demolish a home in the area. This decision proved to be controversial in the affected neighbourhoods and after some public outcry the TTC stated that they would review their plans.

The TTC accepted the city ombudsman's report that these projects were not handled well by staff on two counts: community outreach, consultation and explanations about the technical and engineering decisions made by staff; and how the TTC communicated with residents whose properties were most affected.

After consultation, the community was largely supportive of recommended new location. Second exit construction was scheduled to begin in 2017 and was to be combined with elevator installation to minimize impact on passengers and the community. The TTC promised to engage the community well before proceeding with these projects.

A local working group made up of community volunteers met to discuss the potential location throughout 2017 and 2018 and selected 1416 Danforth Avenue as the community's recommended location for a second exit. As of March 2021, this recommendation is under consideration by the city and the TTC; the construction timeline for the elevators and second exit project has not yet been announced.
