= Toronto subway trackage =

The Toronto Transit Commission (TTC) maintains five rapid transit lines and 109 stations on 100.1 km (62.2 mi) of route.

== Mainline trackage ==
=== Gauge ===
The TTC's heavy rail lines – Lines 1, 2, and 4 – are built to the unique Toronto gauge of 4 ft 10 7/8 in (1,495 mm), which is the same gauge used on the city's streetcar system. However, the former Line 3 Scarborough light metro system (which operated between 1985 and 2023) used standard-gauge track, which is also used for the two light rail lines, Line 5 Eglinton and Line 6 Finch West, and the under-construction Ontario Line.

=== Tunnels ===
Tunnels are either square or round, depending on the method of their construction: Square tunnels were built with the cut-and-cover method of digging trenches down from the surface, constructing the tunnel structure, and then backfilling. Round tunnels are bored using a tunnel boring machine (TBM). The cut and cover technique was used extensively on the oldest portions of the system, while newer sections were predominantly or – in the case of the Toronto–York Spadina subway extension (TYSSE) and the underground portions of Line 5 Eglinton, which opened in 2017 and 2026 respectively – entirely bored.

Some sections of track run on the surface, such as the stretch of Line 1 Yonge–University in the median of Allen Road. The former Line 3 was a surface or elevated route for nearly its entire length.

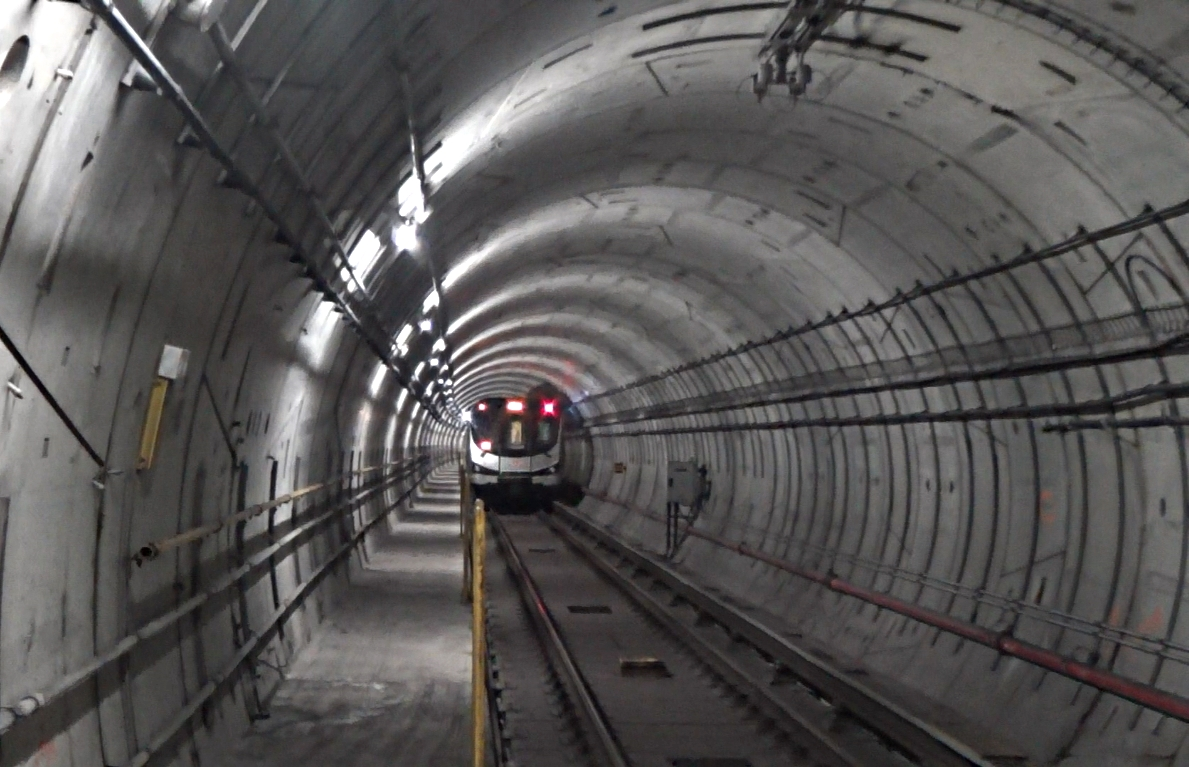
The then-new bored mainline tunnel south of York University station in 2018

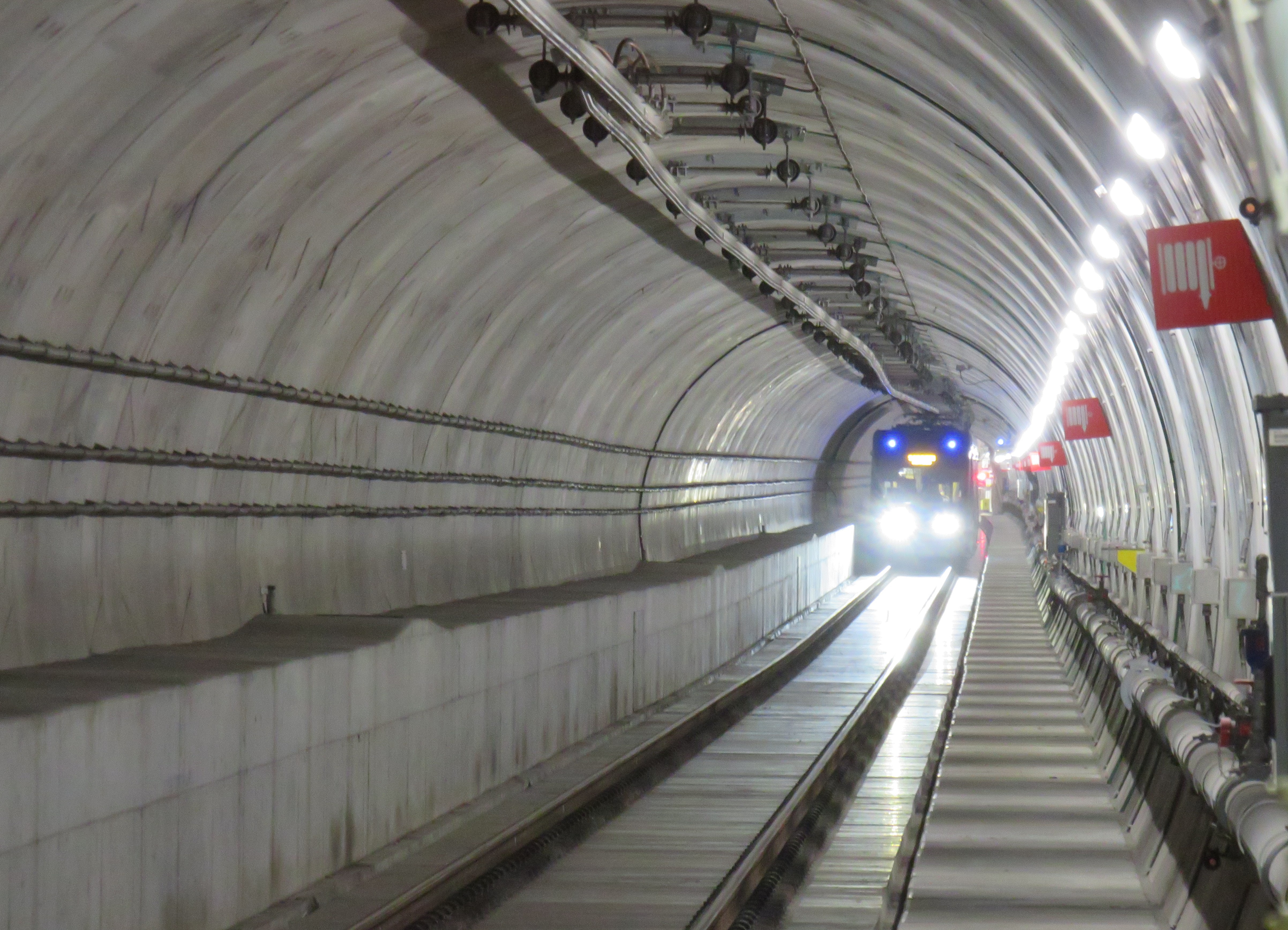
Line 5 Eglinton LRT tunnel with overhead rigid catenary approaching Leaside station

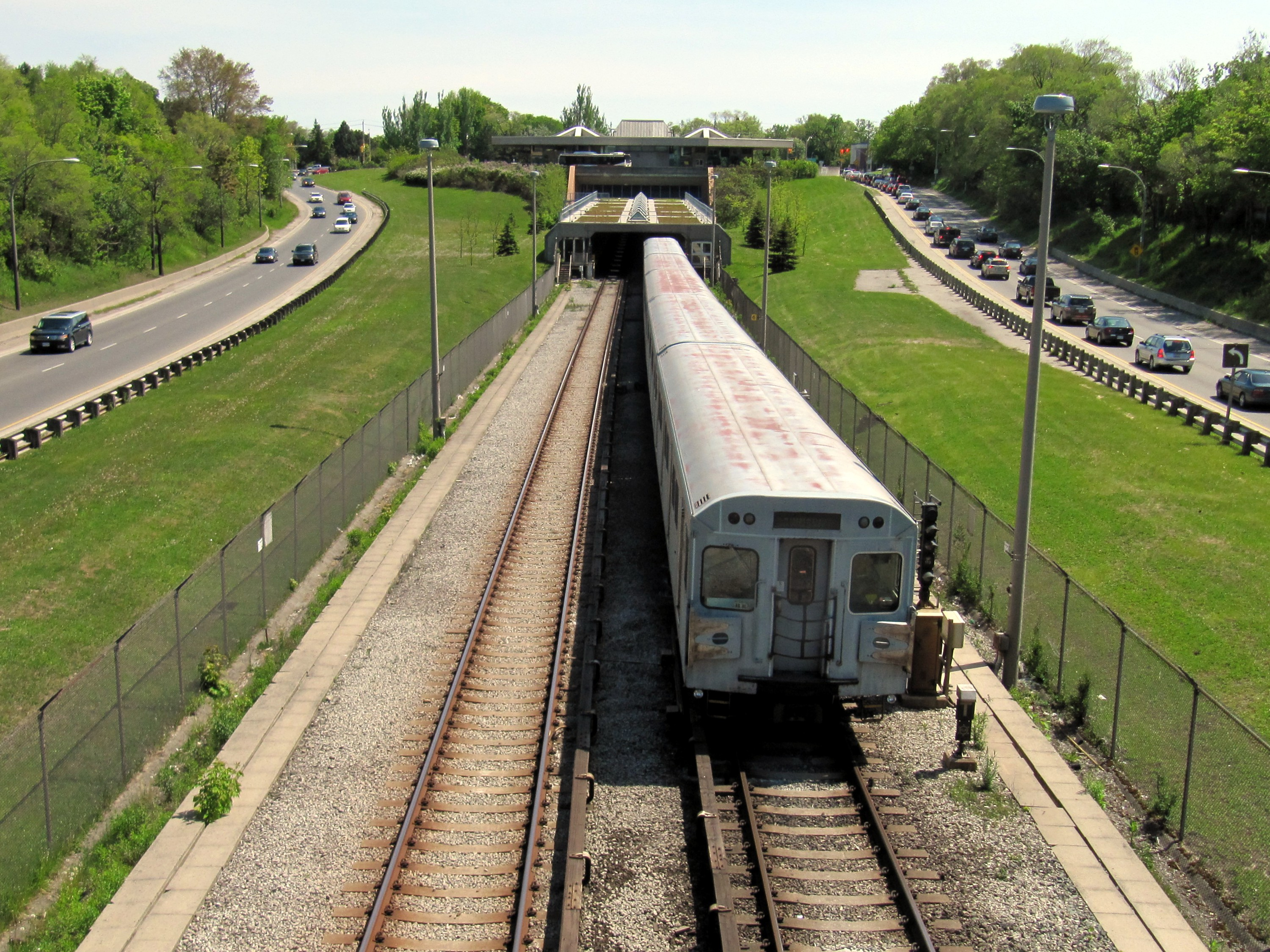
A surface section of Line 1 in the median of Allen Road

== Crossovers ==
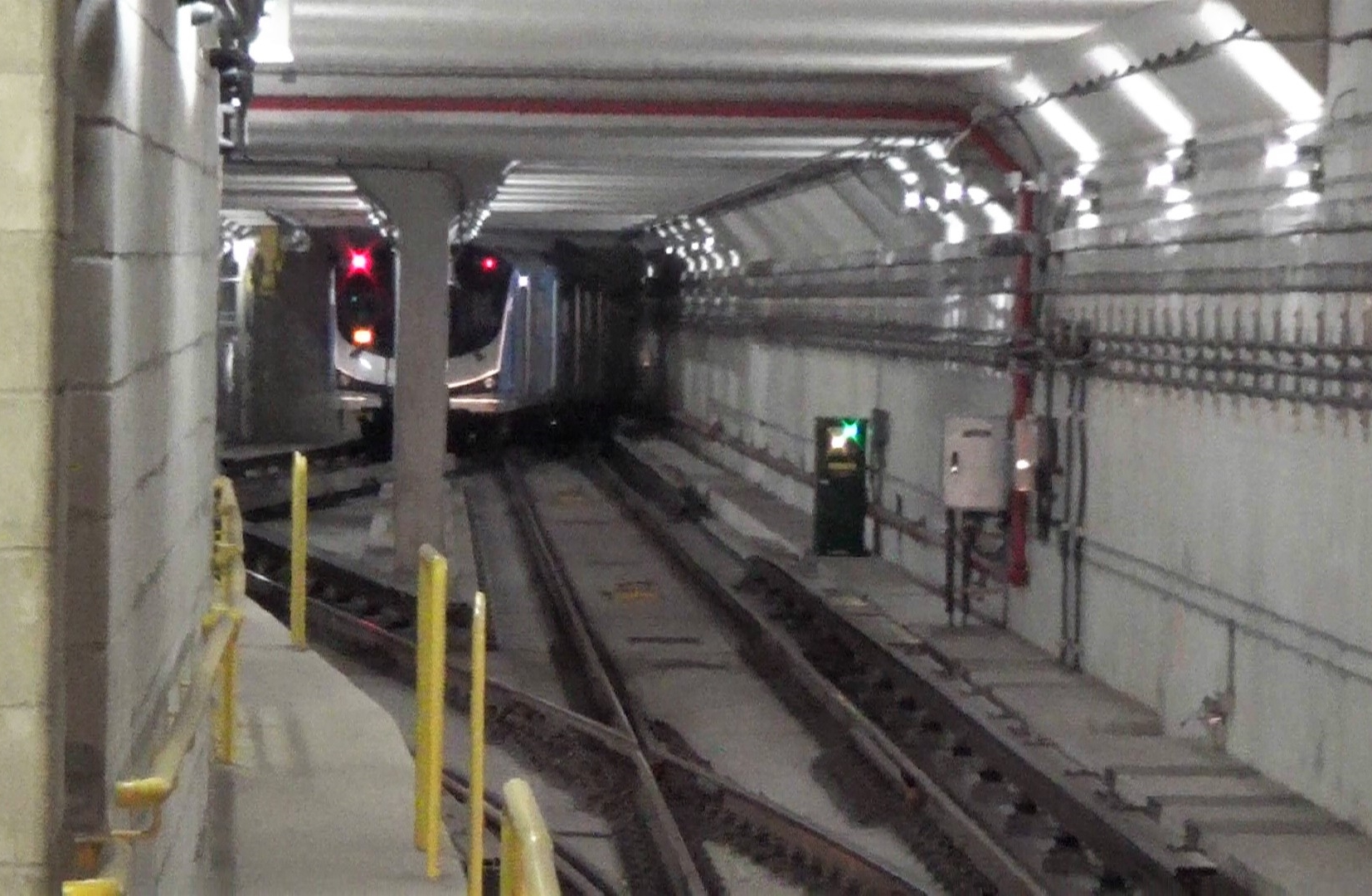
The crossover at Vaughan Metropolitan Centre station with a departing train crossing between the northbound platform and the southbound track

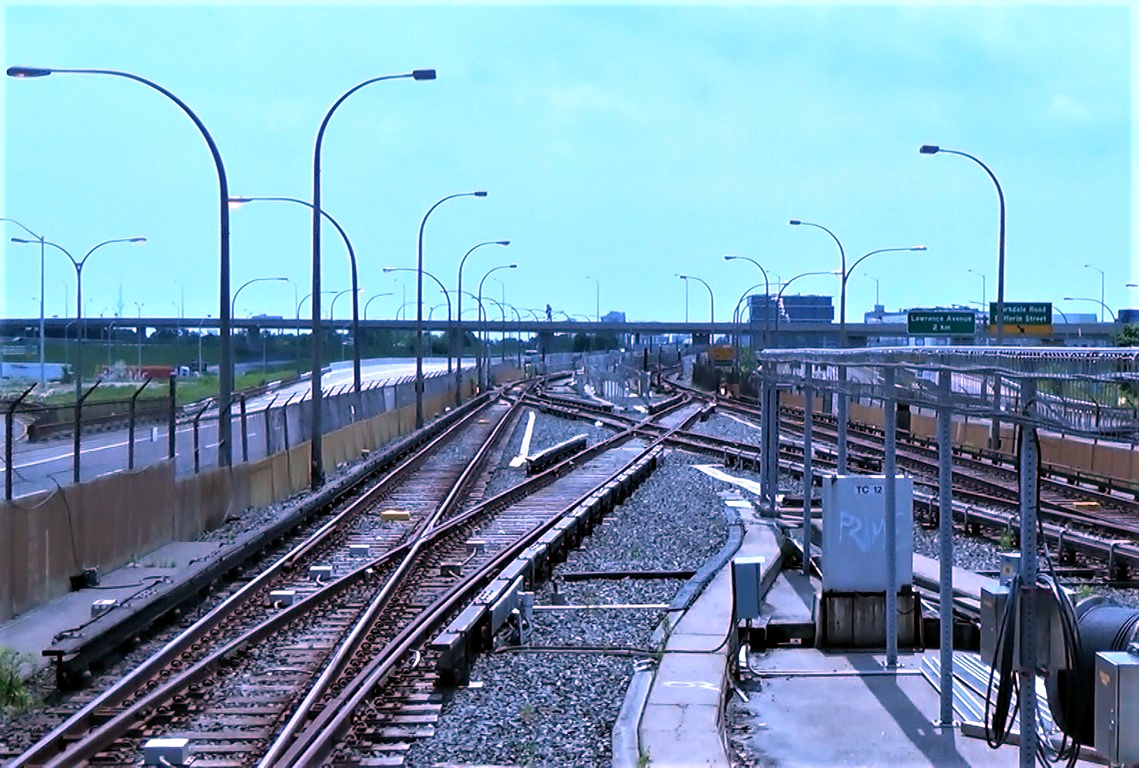
Surface crossover at Wilson station

Diamond crossovers (or "scissors crossovers") are X-shaped track assemblies that are used on Lines 1, 2, and 4, particularly at terminal stations, to allow trains to switch to the opposite platform or track to reverse direction. They also exist at some through stations (mostly those that were former terminal stations before extensions) where they are often used to short turn trains. A single crossover just east of Union Station is what remains of a former diamond crossover, which was used when the station marked the southern terminus of the original line.

Line 5 Eglinton and Line 6 Finch West use, in some locations, a pair of single crossovers (one facing-point and the other trailing-point) or sometimes just a single crossover (either facing-point or trailing-point) instead of diamond crossovers.

Crossovers are found in the vicinity of the following stations. Unless otherwise described, they are diamond crossings.

- Yonge–University line
  - South of Vaughan Metropolitan Centre (terminal station)
  - South of Pioneer Village
  - South of Finch West
  - South of Sheppard West (formerly Downsview station; terminus between 1996 and 2017)
  - South of Wilson (original Spadina line terminus between 1978 and 1996)
  - North of Spadina
  - South of St. George (original University line terminus between 1963–1966 and 1966 (Note: St. George was a through station for six months in 1966 due to an interlining trial with the then-new Line 2.)–1978)
  - East of Union (trailing-point crossover; formerly a diamond crossover; original south Yonge line terminus between 1954 and 1963)
  - North of King, south of Queen
  - North of TMU, south of College
  - North of Bloor
  - South of St. Clair
  - South of Eglinton (original north Yonge line terminus between 1954 and 1973)
  - South of Lawrence
  - South of Sheppard–Yonge
  - South of Finch (terminal station)
- Bloor–Danforth line
  - East of Kipling (terminal station)
  - East of Islington (terminal station between 1968 and 1980)
  - East of Jane
  - East of Keele (part of original west Bloor–Danforth line terminus between 1966 and 1968)
  - East of St. George
  - West of Woodbine (part of original east Bloor–Danforth line terminus between 1966 and 1968)
  - East of Victoria Park
  - West of Warden (terminal station between 1968 and 1980)
  - West of Kennedy (terminal station)
- Sheppard line
  - East and west of Sheppard–Yonge (terminal station)
  - East of Bayview
  - West of Don Mills (terminal station)
- Eglinton line
  - East of Mount Dennis (terminal station)
  - East of Cedarvale
  - East of Eglinton
  - West of Laird
  - West of Don Valley (single facing-point crossover)
  - East of Don Valley
  - Between the Pharmacy and Hakimi Lebovic stops (pair of single crossovers)
  - Between the Birchmount and Ionview stops (pair of single crossovers)
  - West of Kennedy (terminal station)
- Finch West line
  - East of Humber College (terminal station; pair of single crossovers)
  - Between Martin Grove and Albion stops (pair of single crossovers)
  - East of Mount Olive stop (pair of single crossovers)
  - West of Milvan Rumike stop (pair of single crossovers)
  - East of Signet Arrow stop (pair of single crossovers)
  - East of Driftwood stop (pair of single crossovers)
  - West of Finch West (terminal station)

== Centre and pocket tracks ==
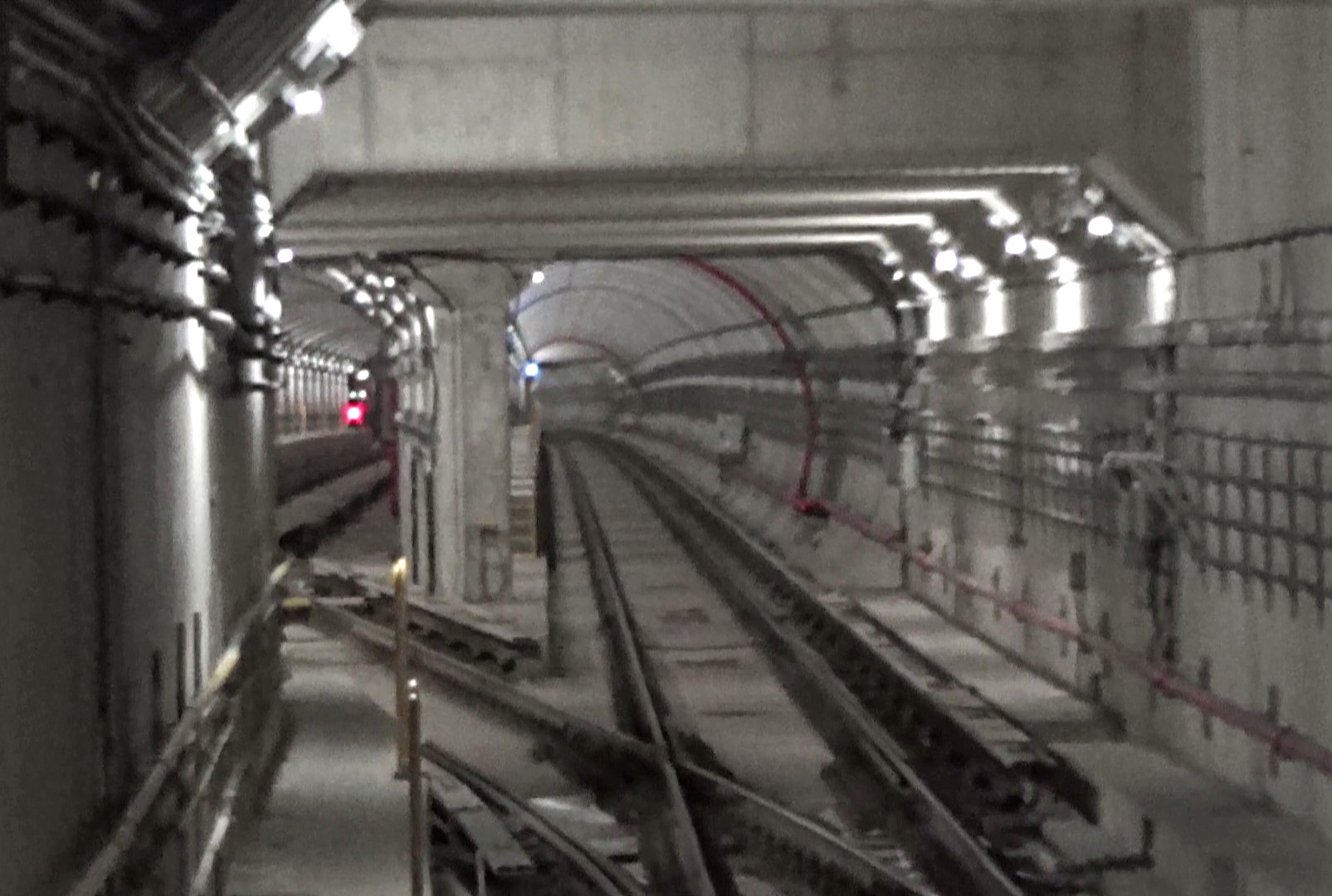
The centre storage track (visible at left) north of Finch West station. Note the cut-away side of the bored mainline tunnel to accommodate the centre track, which was constructed after the initial boring work.

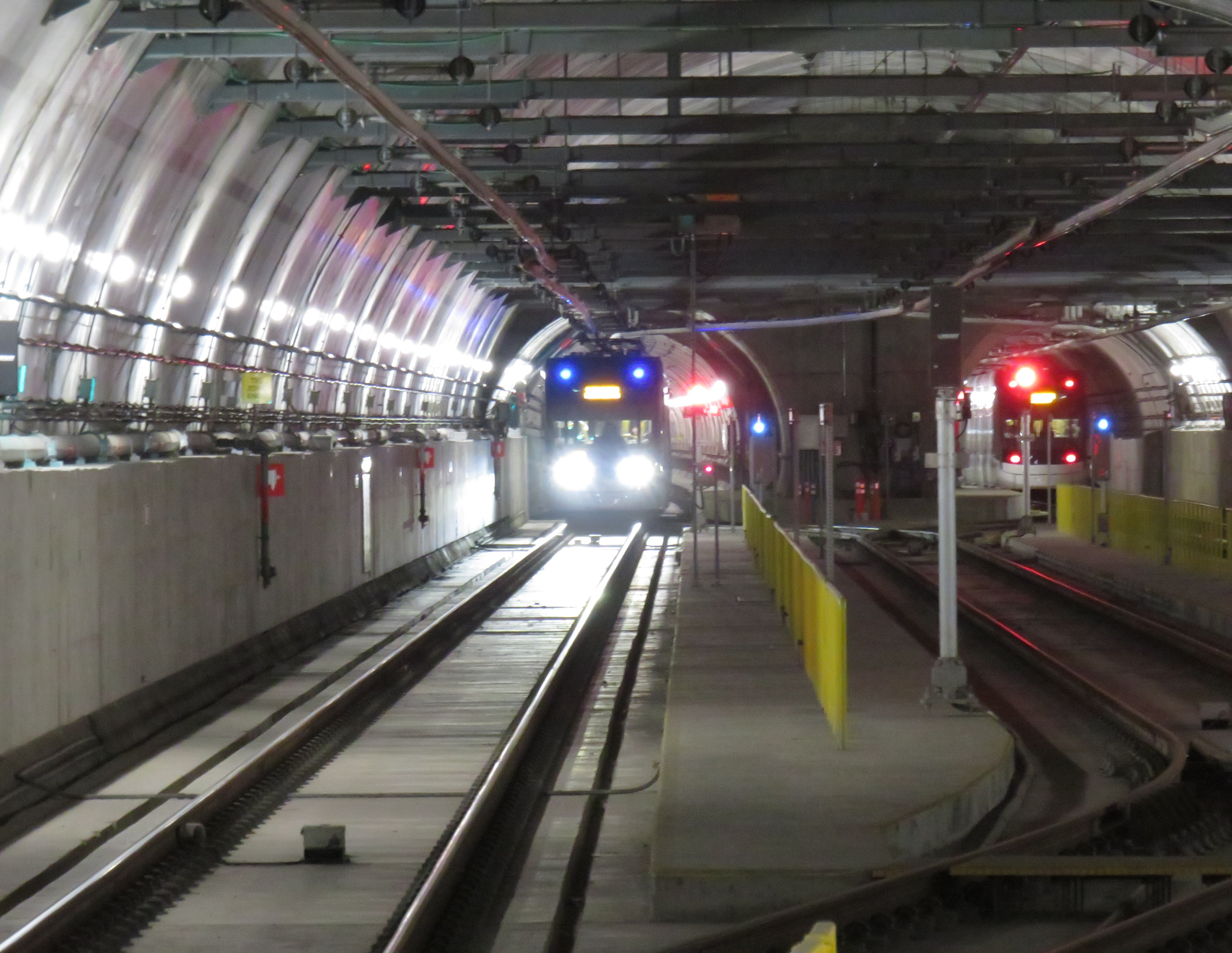
The single tubular tunnel containing the centre storage track east of Laird station, with trains entering and exiting the twin bored tunnels beyond

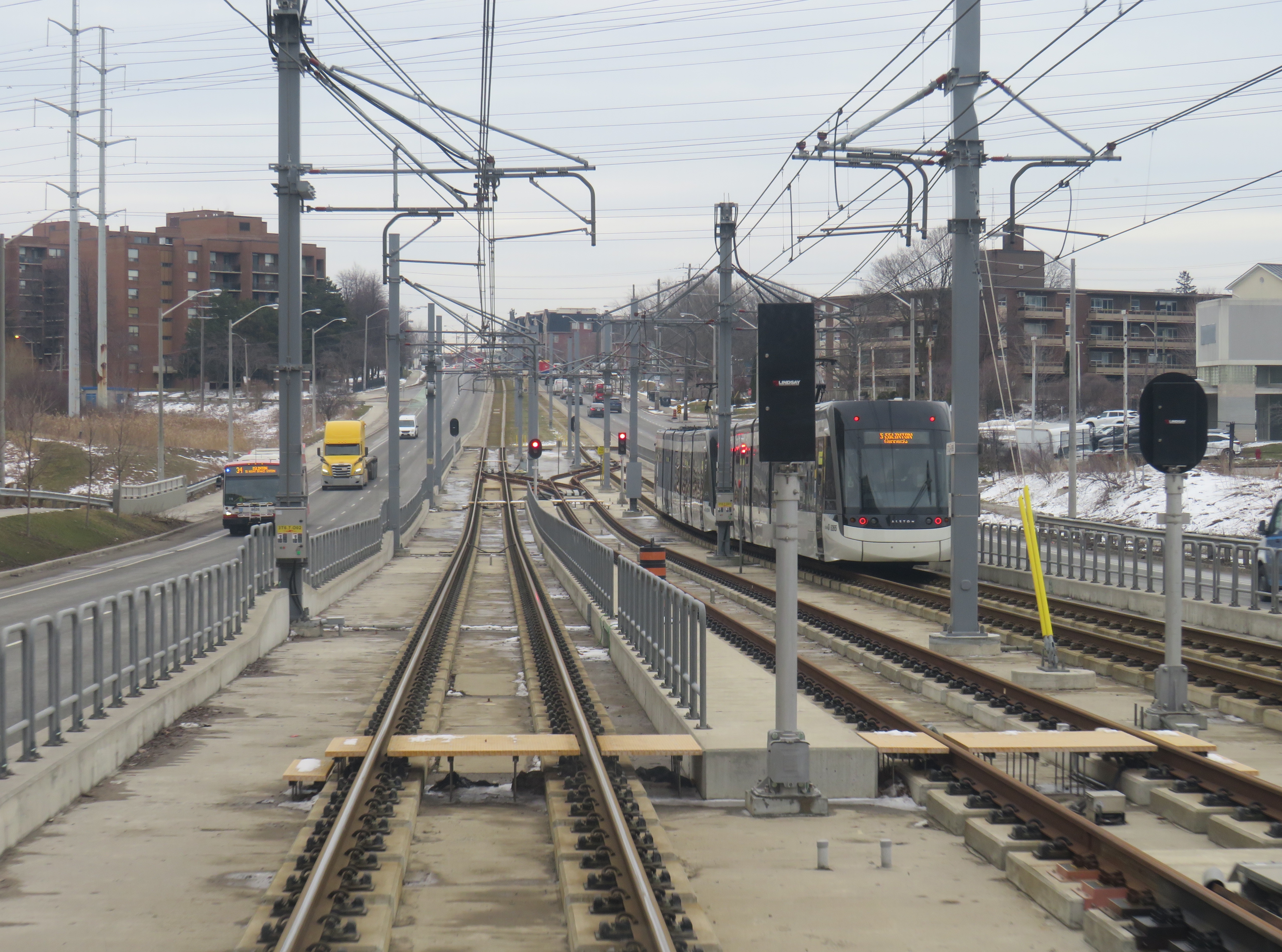
Centre track in the median of Eglinton Avenue east of the Sloane stop on the street-running section of Line 5 Eglinton

Centre tracks allow a train to enter from either end into a third track, longer than the length of a standard train, between the two service tracks. Trains can either layover or short turn there, allowing other trains to pass them by, or reverse direction from this position with minimal interference with through trains compared to crossovers, which requires the reversal to take place on station platforms. Sometimes, in-service trains are diverted into centre tracks when there is track maintenance on one of the service tracks. Pocket tracks are a variation on the centre track, accessible only from one end. Some storage tracks have a short stub extending beyond the convergence back to the service tracks used to store work cars. Most centre-track structures were built using the cut-and-cover method, and there are support columns between the tracks. However, Finch West station, which was partially bored, has three fully separate tunnels, and Avenue and Laird stations, which were "mined" using the sequential excavation method rather than excavated, have all three tracks housed within single tubular, columnless tunnels.

Storage tracks are found in the vicinity of the following stations:

- Yonge–University line
  - North of Finch West
  - South of Lawrence West
  - North of St. Clair West
  - South of Osgoode (accessible from north end only)
  - Between St. Andrew and Union
  - North of Eglinton (accessible from south end only)
  - South of York Mills (terminal station between 1973 and 1974; constructed in place of a diamond crossover)
  - North of Finch (third tail track)
- Bloor–Danforth line
  - East of Islington
  - East of Ossington
  - West of Chester
- Sheppard line
  - There are no centre tracks or storage tracks on Line 4.
- Eglinton line
  - East of Avenue
  - East of Laird
  - East of Sloane
- Finch West line
  - There are no centre tracks or storage tracks on Line 6.

== Other track features ==
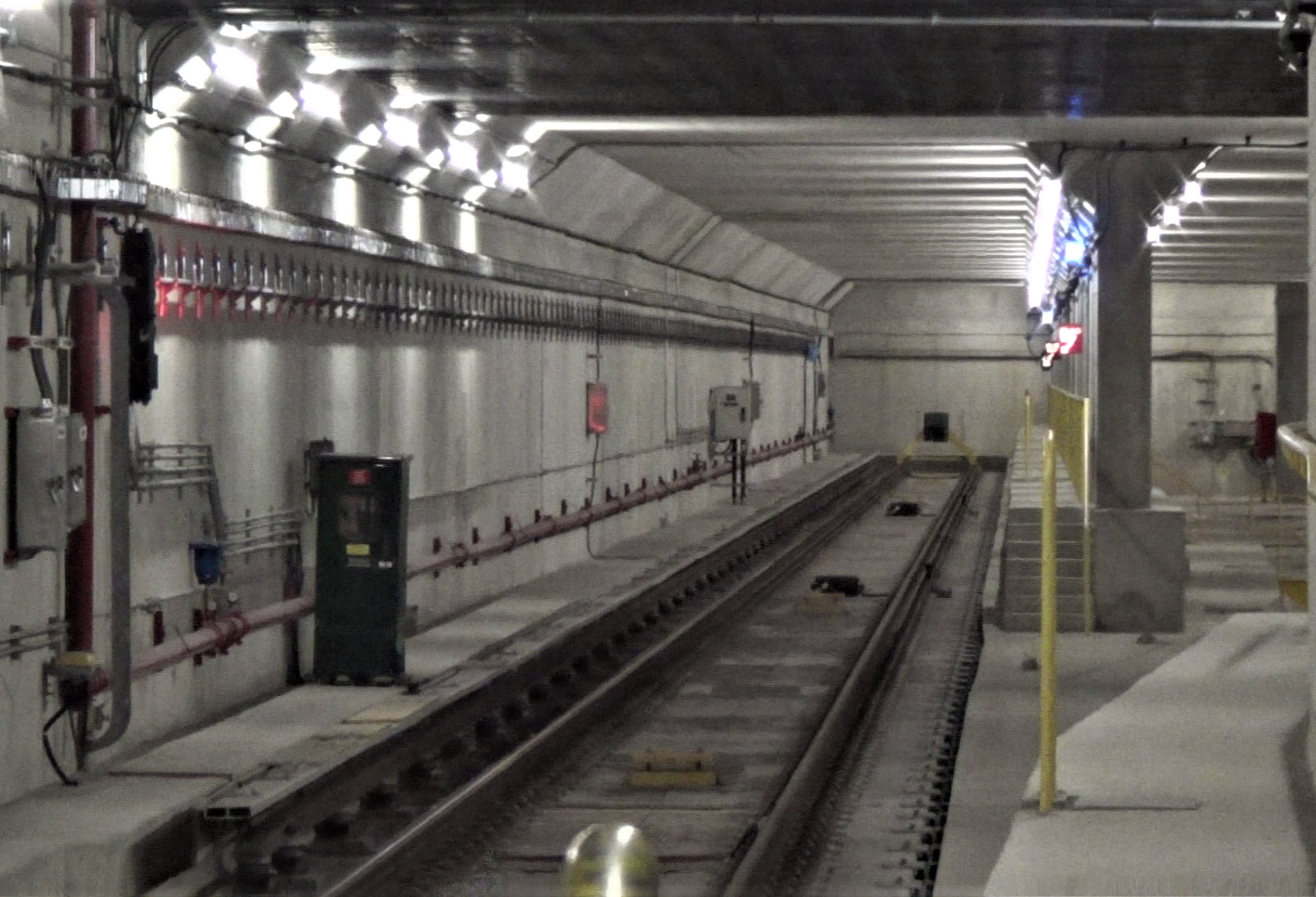
The west (southbound side) tail track at Vaughan Metropolitan Centre station. Note the trackless tunnel section for a potential third tail track at right.

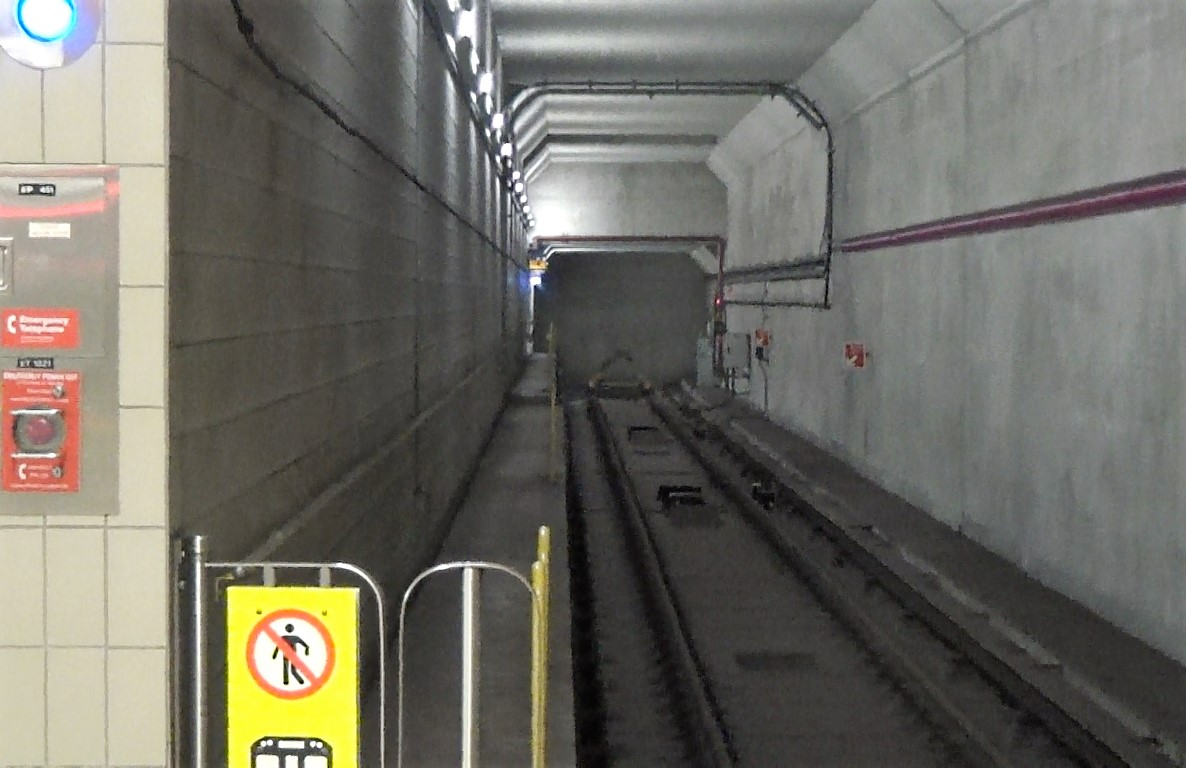
The unusually short tail track at Don Mills station

Track configurations become more complicated where lines meet (at the Spadina–St. George–Museum–Bay–Yonge junction and at Sheppard–Yonge), and at the entrances to subway yards.

On Lines 1, 2, and 4, tracks usually continue for roughly the length of a train beyond the last station on a line; these are known as tail tracks. The only exception to this is at Don Mills station, where the tail tracks are less than two cars in length. This is likely because storage capacity is available at Sheppard–Yonge, which can store enough trains to service the line. The tail track structures at some terminal or former terminal stations also have, or have provisions for, a third tail track. Finch station has such a triple configuration, Vaughan Metropolitan Centre station is a terminal station with a trackless tunnel section for installation of a potential third tail track, and Sheppard West station was a former terminal also built with a trackless third tunnel north of it, which could now accommodate a future standard pocket track.

Other track features that exist include the following:

The Bloor wye was used for interlining between Lines 1 and 2 in 1966:

- North of Museum station, the tracks split, with the Line 1 mainline leading west to St. George station (upper), and the other east to Bay lower (abandoned a few months later in late 1966).
- The eastbound track from Bay lower joins the Bloor–Danforth line just before Yonge station while the westbound track from Bay lower turns and meets the southbound track just north of Museum station.
- The eastbound tracks approaching St. George station from Spadina on the Bloor-Danforth line split, with one heading for St. George lower and the other heading for St. George upper.
- The westbound track headed to Spadina station west of St. George upper now includes a switch that allows trains to run to Spadina station on the Bloor line, which was built more than a decade after the interlining trial was completed.

The tracks used for access to yards:

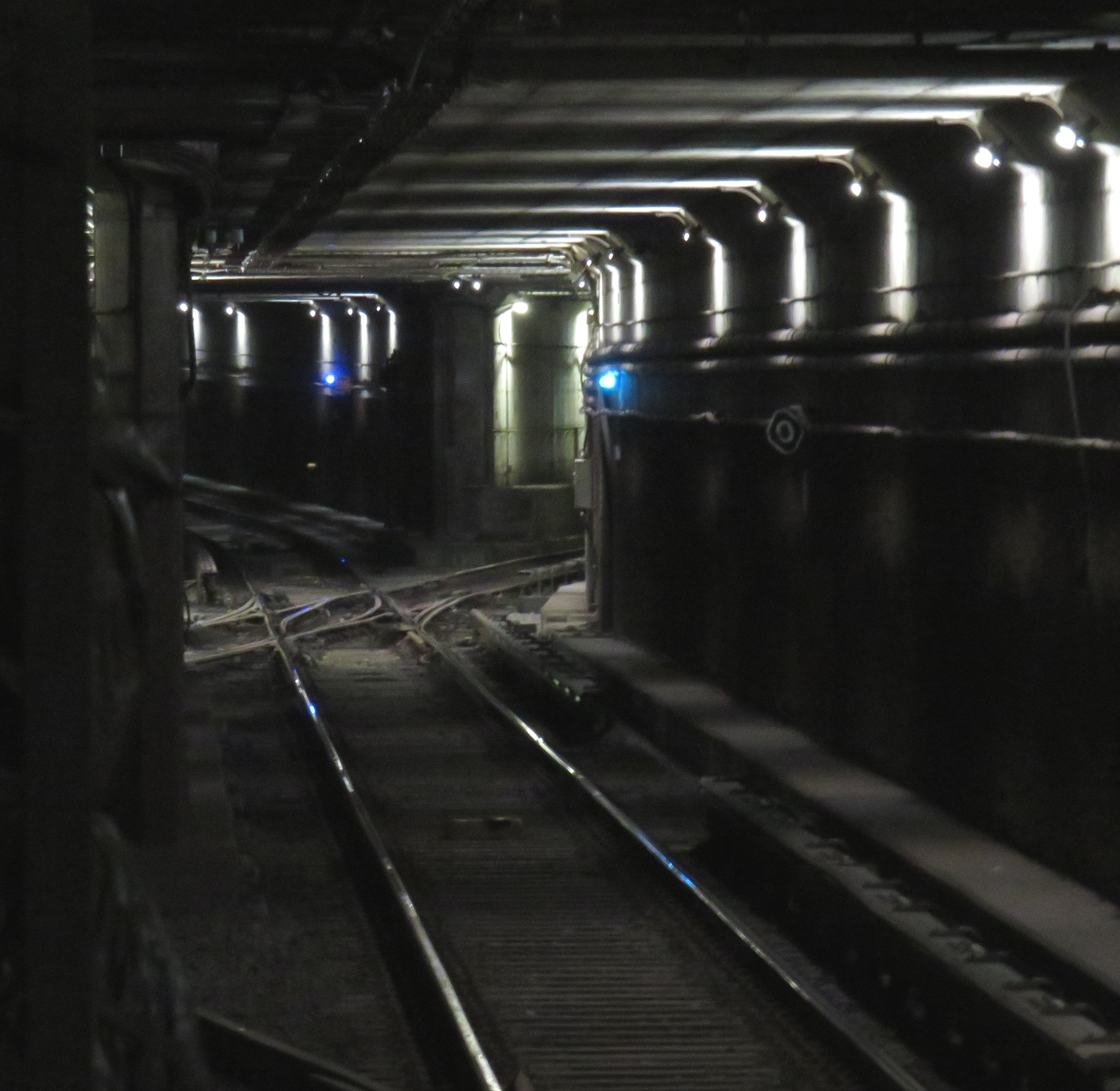
The connecting tunnel to Wilson Yard (diverging off to right) south of Sheppard West station

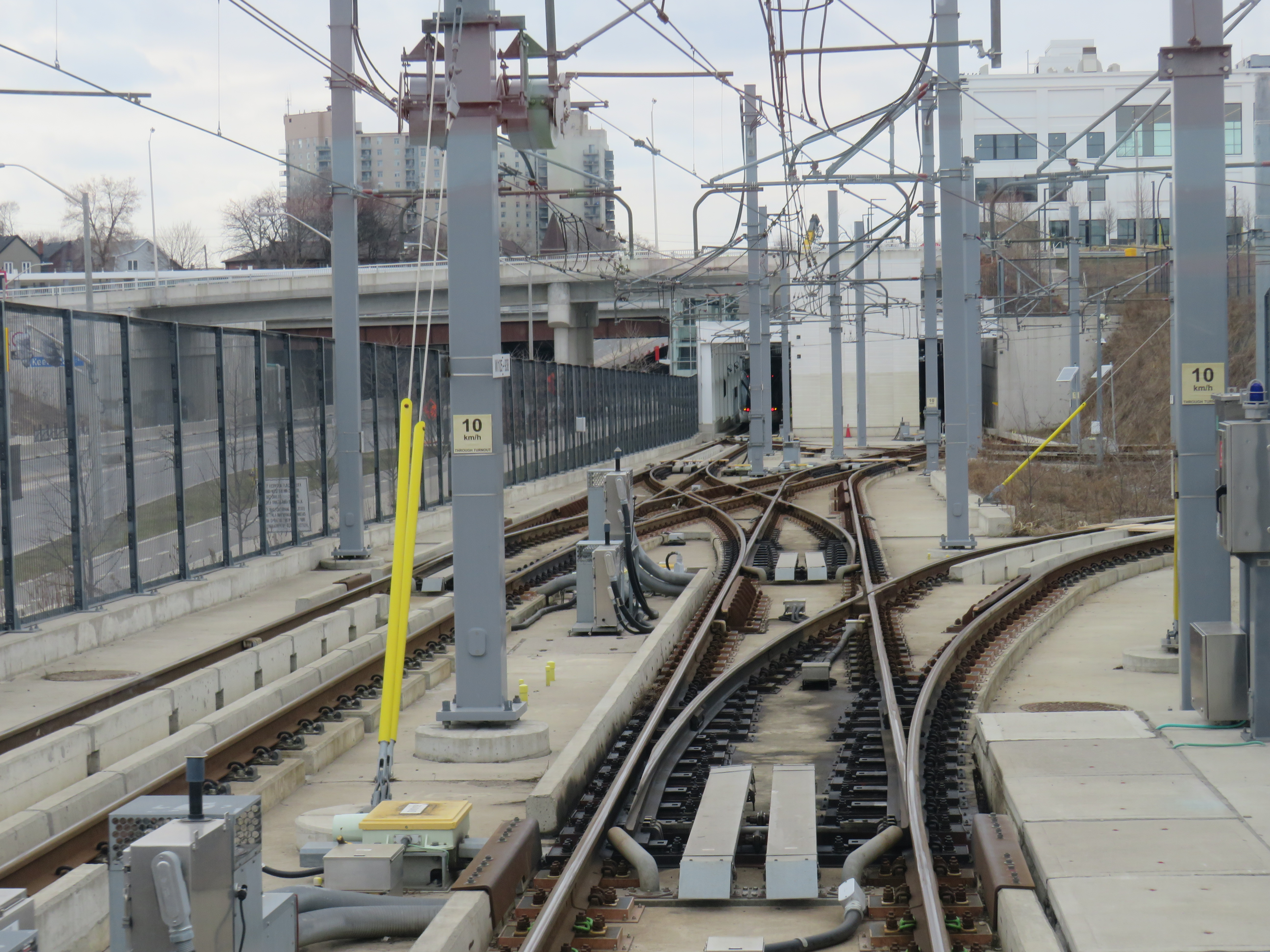
The east lead-in track to the Eglinton Maintenance and Storage Facility (foreground) and the diamond crossover east of Mount Dennis station (background)

- Single cross-overs act as entrances and exits to Keele (Line 2), Wilson, and Davisville subway yards (Line 1).
- The Greenwood wye between Donlands and Greenwood stations allows both east and westbound trains to route south to the Greenwood Yard.
- An access track leading west to Wilson Yard south of Sheppard West station from the southbound direction, defaulting from the crossover track section leading to/from the station's northbound platform. Trains needing to access the yard from the south must reverse at the station (from either side of the island platform) or access it from the crossover north of Wilson station.
- A maintenance track, accessible from the eastbound track on the Bloor–Danforth line, just west of Warden station. Trains must run in reverse to access this siding
- On Line 5, immediately east of its western terminal station, Mount Dennis, there is a wye junction to connect the line to its maintenance and storage facility, with the station's crossover sandwiched between the two ends.
- On Line 6, at York Gate Boulevard, there is a wye junction to connect the line to its maintenance and storage facility. Most of this wye is in a street intersection partially in mixed traffic.

The Sheppard Wye allows the movement of out-of-service trains between the Sheppard line and the Davisville Yard on the Yonge line. The wye has the following features:

- Northbound Yonge line to eastbound Sheppard line: track switch on the Yonge Line that meets the Sheppard line east of Sheppard–Yonge station
- Westbound Sheppard line to southbound Yonge line: west of Sheppard–Yonge station on the Sheppard line storage tracks and switches allow trains to proceed from east to south connecting with the southbound Yonge line just south of Sheppard–Yonge station

Each Line 1, 2, and 4 yard has different features that join them to the mainline. Operators generally board their train at a point where the yard meets the main line, at the Greenwood Portal, the Davisville Buildup (third platform of Davisville station), or the Wilson Hostler (platform-like in appearance seen heading between Wilson and Sheppard West stations on the east side of the yard) depending on the home yard. Lines 5 and 6 have a similar feature at their maintenance and storage facilities.

== See also ==
- Toronto rapid transit signals
