= Laird station =

Toronto subway station

Laird
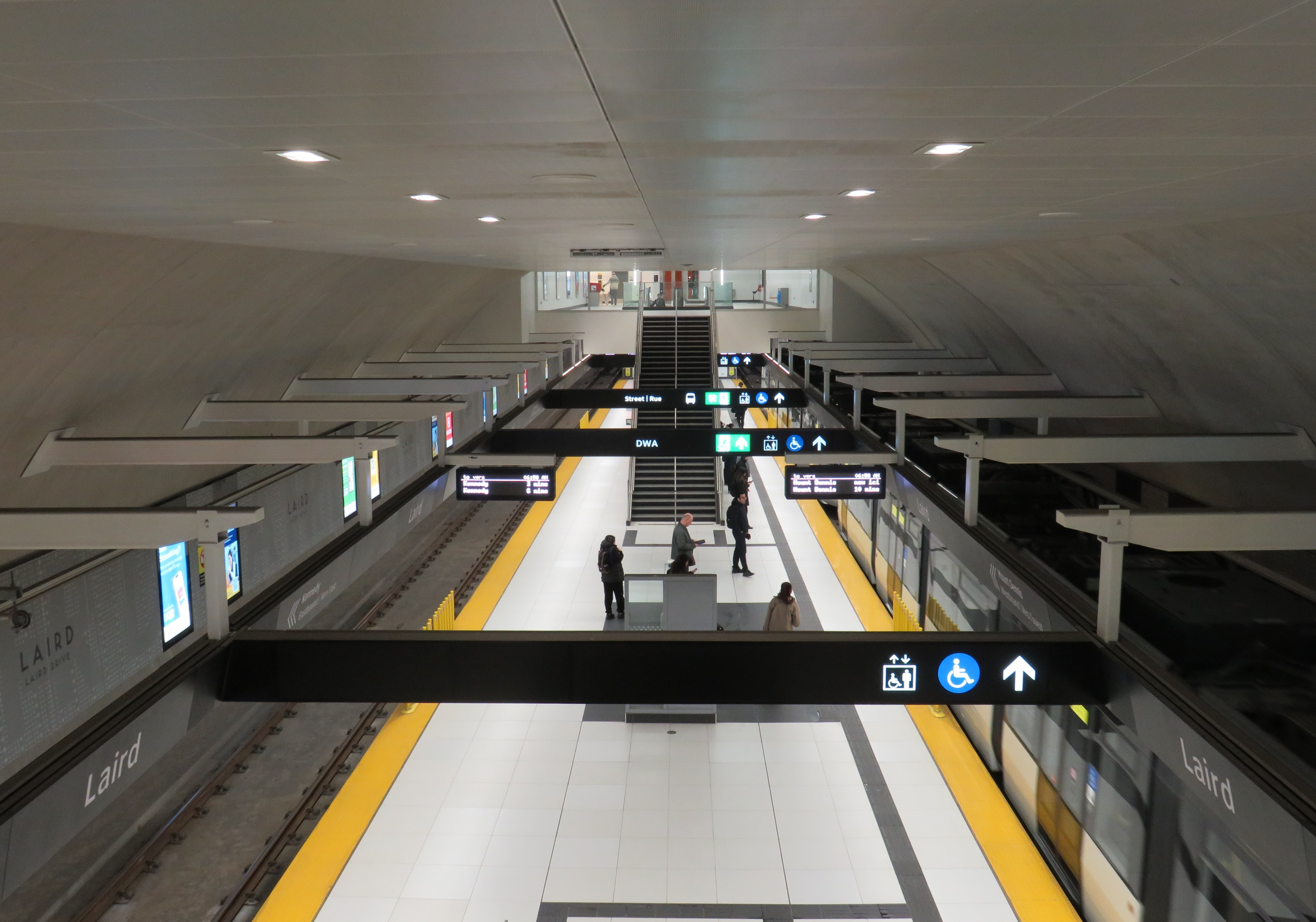
- Laird station platform

General information
- Location: 811 Eglinton Avenue East; Toronto, Ontario; Canada
- Coordinates: 43°42′48″N 79°21′54″W
- Owner: Metrolinx
- Platforms: Centre platform
- Tracks: 2
- Connections: TTC buses: 34 Eglinton; 51 Leslie; 88 South Leaside; 334 Eglinton

Construction
- Structure type: Underground
- Accessible: Yes
- Architect: Arcadis

History
- Opened: February 8, 2026; 9 months ago

Services
Preceding station	Toronto Transit Commission	Following station
Leaside towards Mount Dennis	Line 5 Eglinton	Sunnybrook Park towards Kennedy
Location

Laird is an underground Toronto subway station on Line 5 Eglinton in Toronto, Ontario, Canada. It is located in the Leaside neighbourhood in East York at the intersection of Laird Drive and Eglinton Avenue.

== Description ==
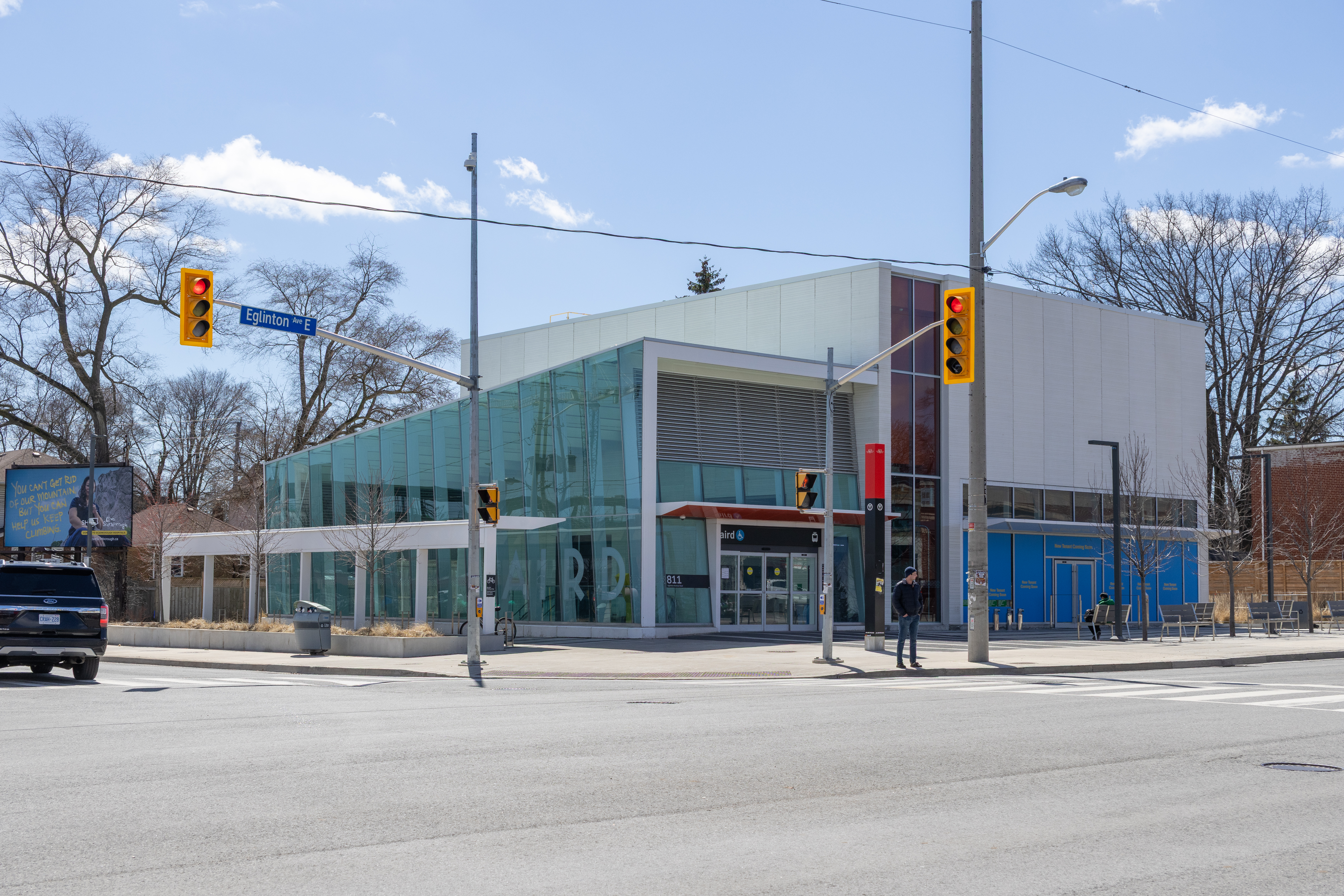
Main entrance after the opening of Line 5 Eglinton in 2026

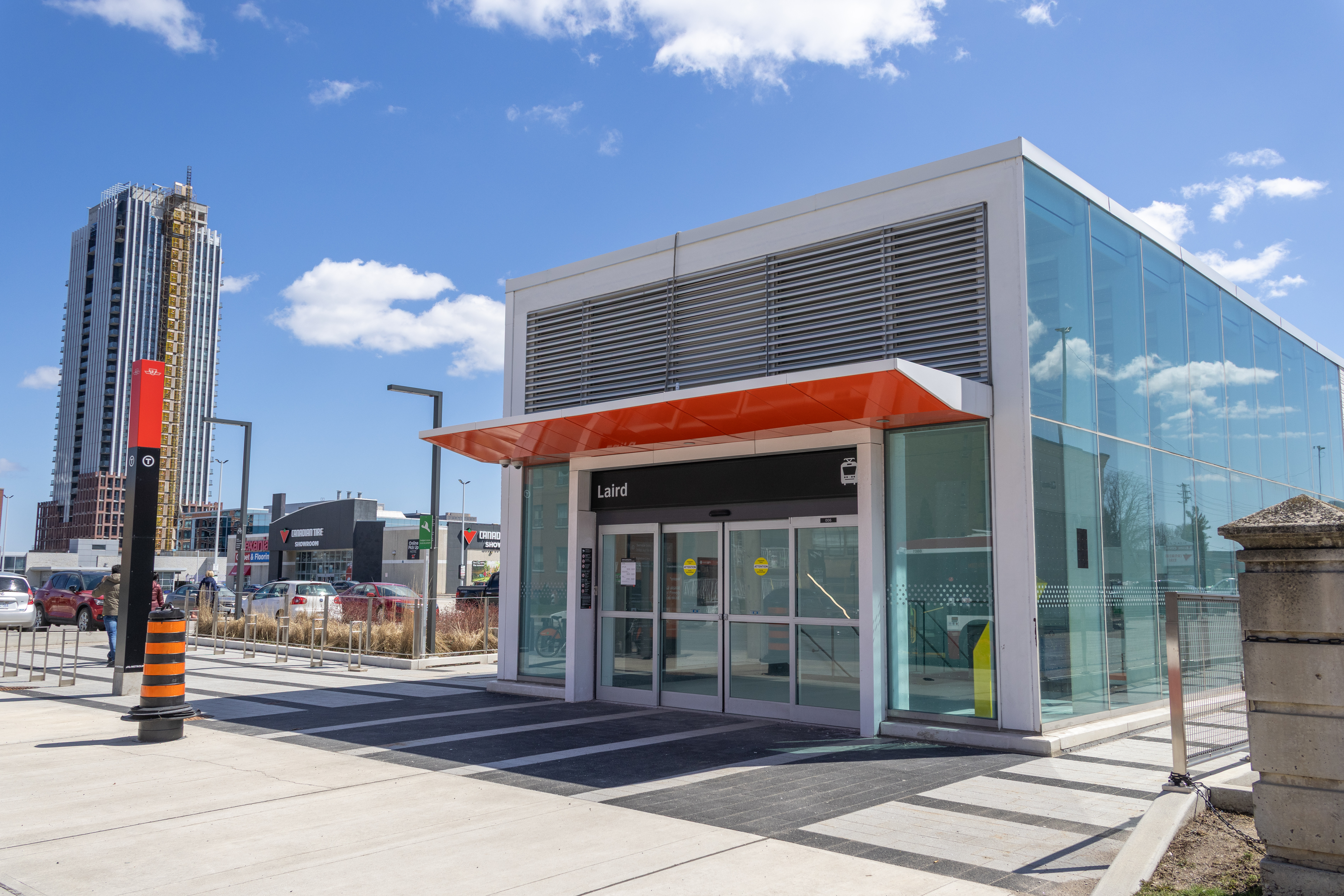
Second entrance to Laird station in April 2026

This station's entrances are both on the south side of Eglinton Avenue. The main entrance is at the southwest corner of the Laird Drive intersection replacing a small strip mall and the secondary one is east of that in the Leaside Centre parking lot, just beyond the Pier 1 Imports store.

On the east side of the station, there is a third track between the eastbound and westbound tracks, either to store a train or to allow a train to change direction due to an emergency or a change in service. On the west side of the station, there is a diamond crossover. Laird station is the easternmost underground station in the main tunnel; the line emerges onto Eglinton about 250 metres (820 ft) east of Brentcliffe Drive and changes to predominantly on-street operation in a dedicated right-of-way in the centre of the street east to Kennedy station.

Destinations include the many commercial establishments to the southeast: Leaside Centre, the SmartCentres on Laird, and the Leaside Business Park on Eglinton.

=== Architecture ===
The station was designed by Arcadis, following an architectural concept designed by architects gh3* from Toronto and Daoust Lestage Lizotte Stecker from Montreal. As with other stations on Line 5, architectural feature includes natural light from large windows and skylights, steel structures painted white, and orange accents (the colour of the line).

== Construction ==
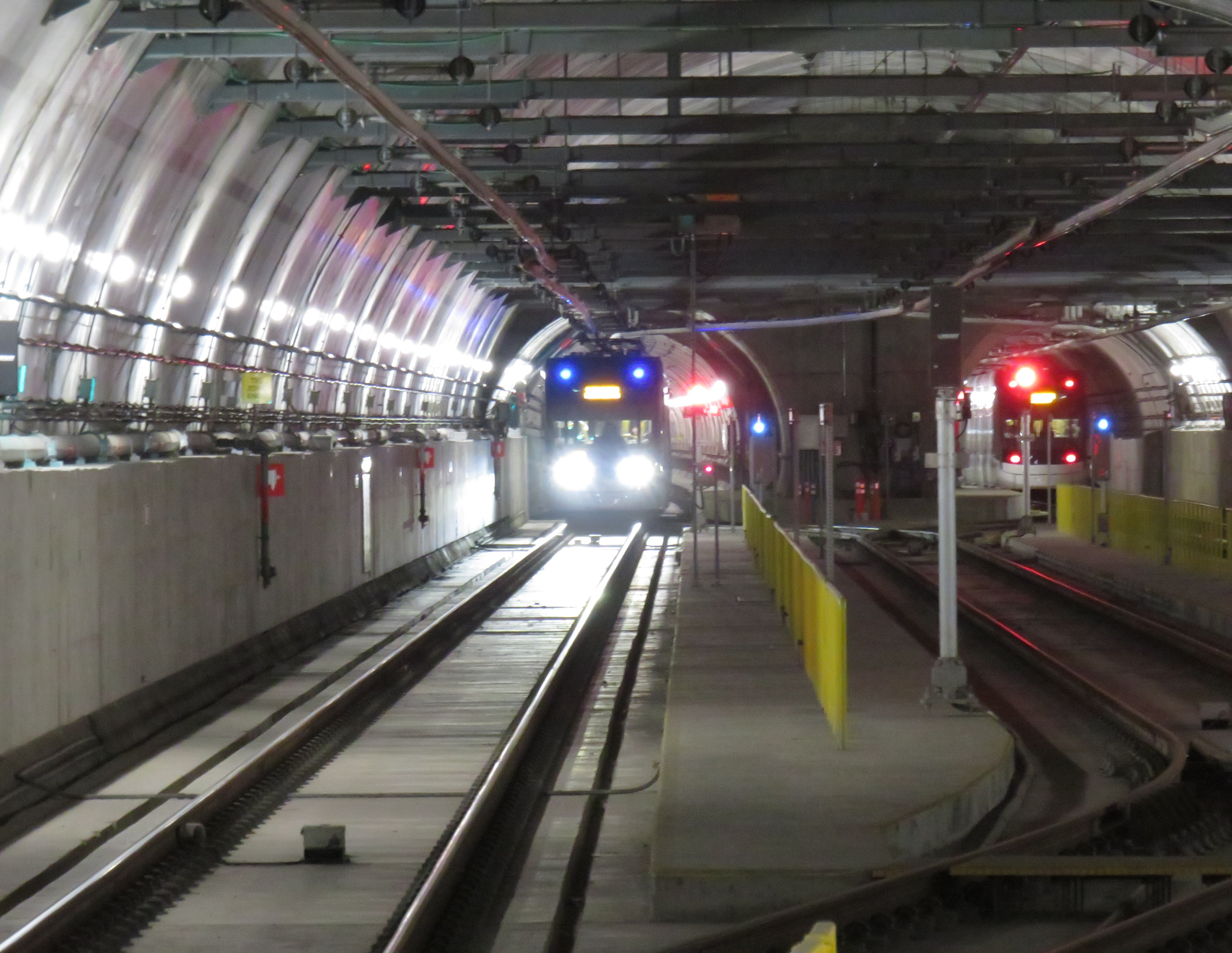
The single tubular tunnel containing the centre storage track east of the station, with trains at the threshold of the twin bored tunnels beyond

Ontario premier Kathleen Wynne officiated at the ground-breaking for the station on June 30, 2016.

The station was constructed using the sequential excavation method (SEM), referred to as "mining". Laird, Avenue and Oakwood stations were all constructed by this method, while the other underground Line 5 stations were built by cut-and-cover. According to Crosslinx, SEM is more common in Europe and the Crosstown is the first project to use the technique in Toronto.

Two shafts were built on the south side of Eglinton Avenue on both the east and west sides of Laird Drive. From the vertical shafts, workers mined horizontally towards and above the twin tunnels created by the tunnel boring machines. Large pipe-like sections are used to support the roof of the excavation. Then, workers gradually excavated down to the liners of the twin tunnels, which were removed. When the excavation was finished, there was a multi-storey cavern with an arched ceiling, which provides enough strength to support the ground above. The tunnel walls were then sprayed with shotcrete. Excavation was done slowly, about 1.5 metres per day; mining work proceeded on a 24-hour, 7-day-a-week basis.

The station's mined cavern is 489 metres (1,604 ft) long because it contains a crossover and a storage track in addition to the train platform. Both the platform and the adjacent trackworks are contained within a single circular tube, and there are no support columns between the tracks. Using cut-and-cover would have disrupted approximately 500 metres (1,600 ft) of Eglinton Avenue.

== Surface connections ==
The following bus routes serve Laird station:

Route	Name	Additional information
34	Eglinton	Westbound to Mount Dennis station and eastbound to Kennedy station
51A	Leslie	Northbound to Leslie station and southbound to Donlands station
51B	Leslie	Northbound to Don Mills Road and Lawrence Avenue East and southbound to Donlands station
88	South Leaside	Westbound to St. Clair station
334A	Eglinton	Blue Night service; eastbound to Kennedy station and westbound to Renforth Drive and Pearson Airport
334B	Eglinton	Blue Night service; eastbound to Finch Avenue East and Neilson Road via Morningside Avenue and westbound to Mount Dennis station
