= Wilson station (Toronto) =

Toronto subway station

Wilson
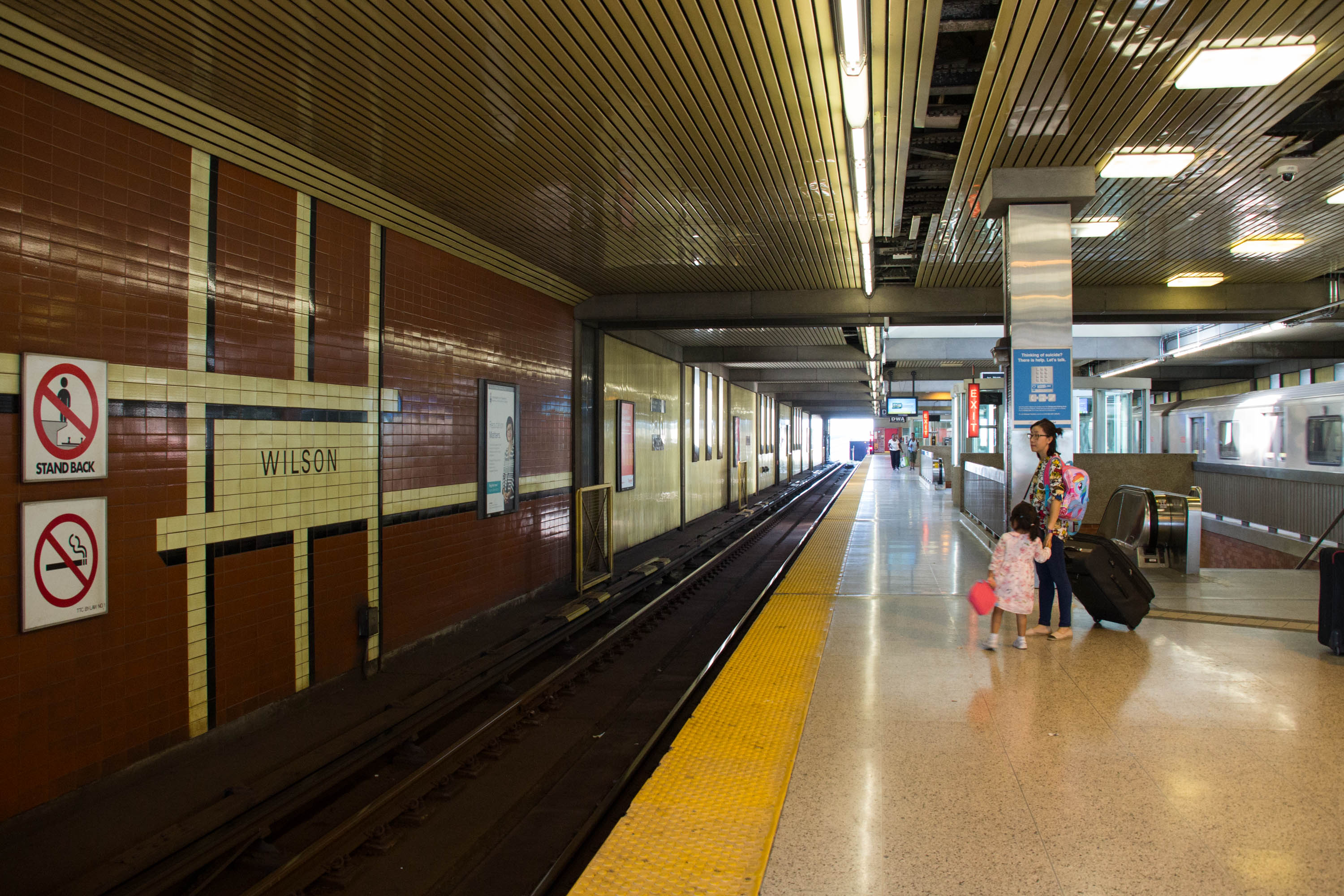
- Wilson station platform

General information
- Location: 570 Wilson Avenue; Toronto, Ontario; Canada
- Coordinates: 43°44′04″N 79°27′00″W
- Platforms: Centre platform
- Tracks: 2
- Connections: TTC buses: 29 Dufferin; 96 Wilson; 101B Downsview Park; 104 Faywood; 118 Thistle Down; 119 Torbarrie; 120 Calvington; 160 Bathurst North; 165 Weston Rd North; 184 Ancaster Park; 329 Dufferin; 396 Wilson; 929 Dufferin Express; 996 Wilson Express

Construction
- Structure type: At grade
- Parking: 72 spaces
- Accessible: Yes
- Architect: TTC in-house architects

Other information
- Website: Official station page

History
- Opened: 28 January 1978; 48 years ago
- Rebuilt: 2018

Passengers
- 2023–2024: 21,579
- Rank: 28 of 70

Services
Preceding station	Toronto Transit Commission	Following station
Sheppard West towards Vaughan	Line 1 Yonge–University	Yorkdale towards Finch
Track layout
Location

Wilson is a station on Line 1 Yonge–University of the Toronto subway in Toronto, Ontario, Canada. It is located in the median of Allen Road at Wilson Avenue. The station is accessible, has commuter parking – including bike parking – and connects to many bus routes.

== History ==
Wilson station was opened in what was then the Borough of North York as the last station in the 1978 subway line extension north from St. George station. According to historian Mike Filey, Wilson Avenue is a misspelling of Arthur L. Willson, who was a clerk and treasurer of York Township for over twelve years around 1875. Among Arthur Willson's accomplishments were writing a "municipal manual", "which has been found of practical value as a guide to those requiring a knowledge of municipal law", according to a history of the County of York.

Wilson was the northwestern terminus of the Yonge–University line for eighteen years and a major hub for TTC bus service, but with the extension to Sheppard West (then named Downsview) in 1996, many of the bus routes serving areas to the north were moved to the new station.

Concurrent with the opening of the Toronto–York Spadina Subway Extension (TYSSE) on 17 December 2017, this station became one of the first eight stations to discontinue sales of legacy TTC fare media (tokens and tickets), previously available at a fare collector booth. Presto vending machines were available to sell Presto cards and to load funds onto them. On 3 May 2019, this station became one of the first ten stations to sell Presto tickets via Presto vending machines.

In November 2018, construction began on three new elevators, automatic sliding doors, and a new accessible washroom, to make the station wheelchair accessible. It was completed on 18 December 2020.

By the late 1990s, over 2,000 commuter parking spaces were available. Two lots were declared surplus in 2013 and have been redeveloped. Until November 2024, 953 parking spaces remained at Wilson; however, in October 2021, the city government reached an agreement with developer Tridel to build 1,484 new homes, a childcare centre and a new park on the main parking lot. Since 18 November 2024, only the Wilson Transit Road Lot with 72 spaces remains available. Following the opening of the subway extension into York Region in 2017, new commuter parking lots are available farther north at stations like Highway 407 and Pioneer Village.

== Architecture and art ==
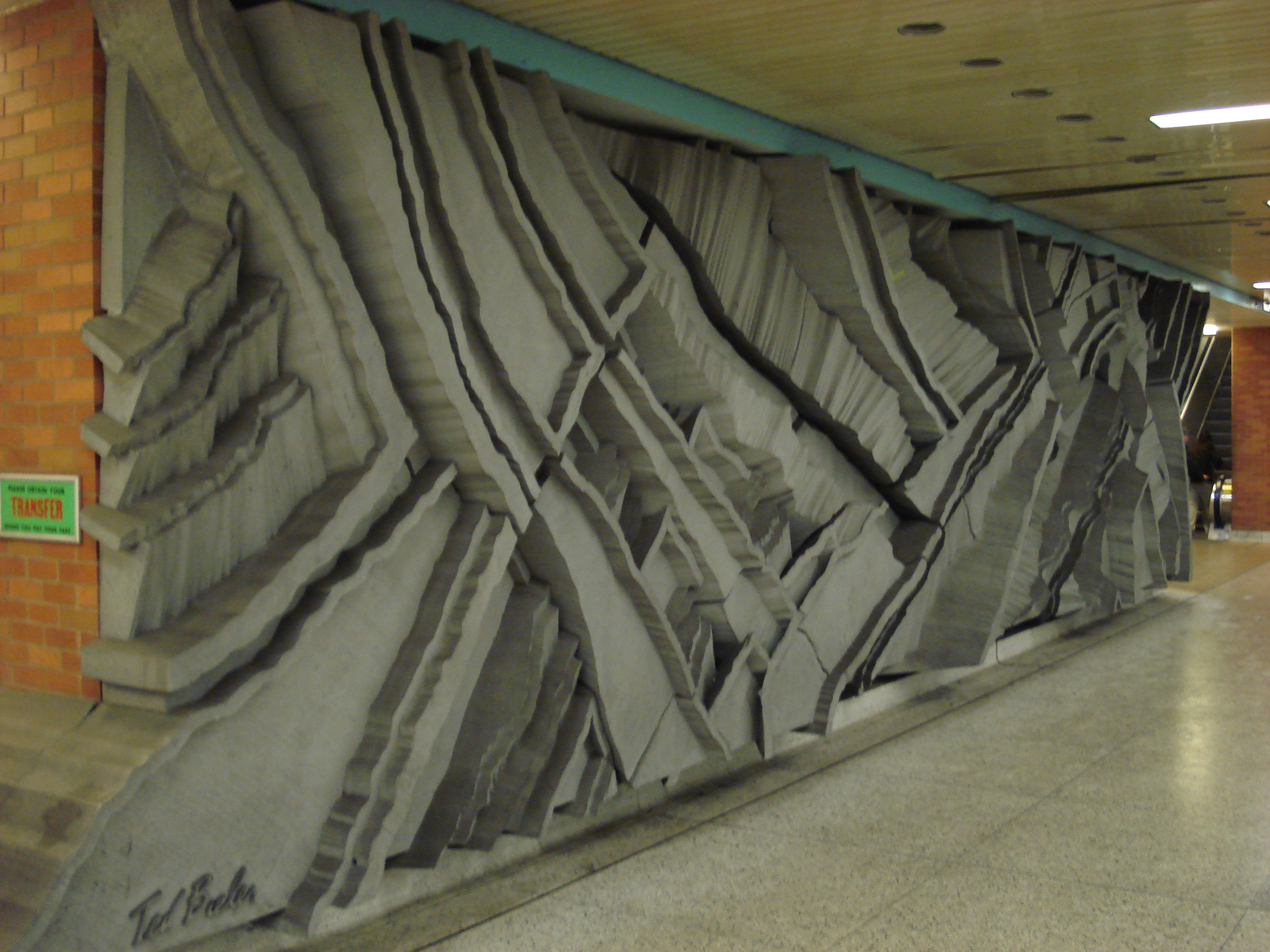
Canyons sculpture by Ted Bieler

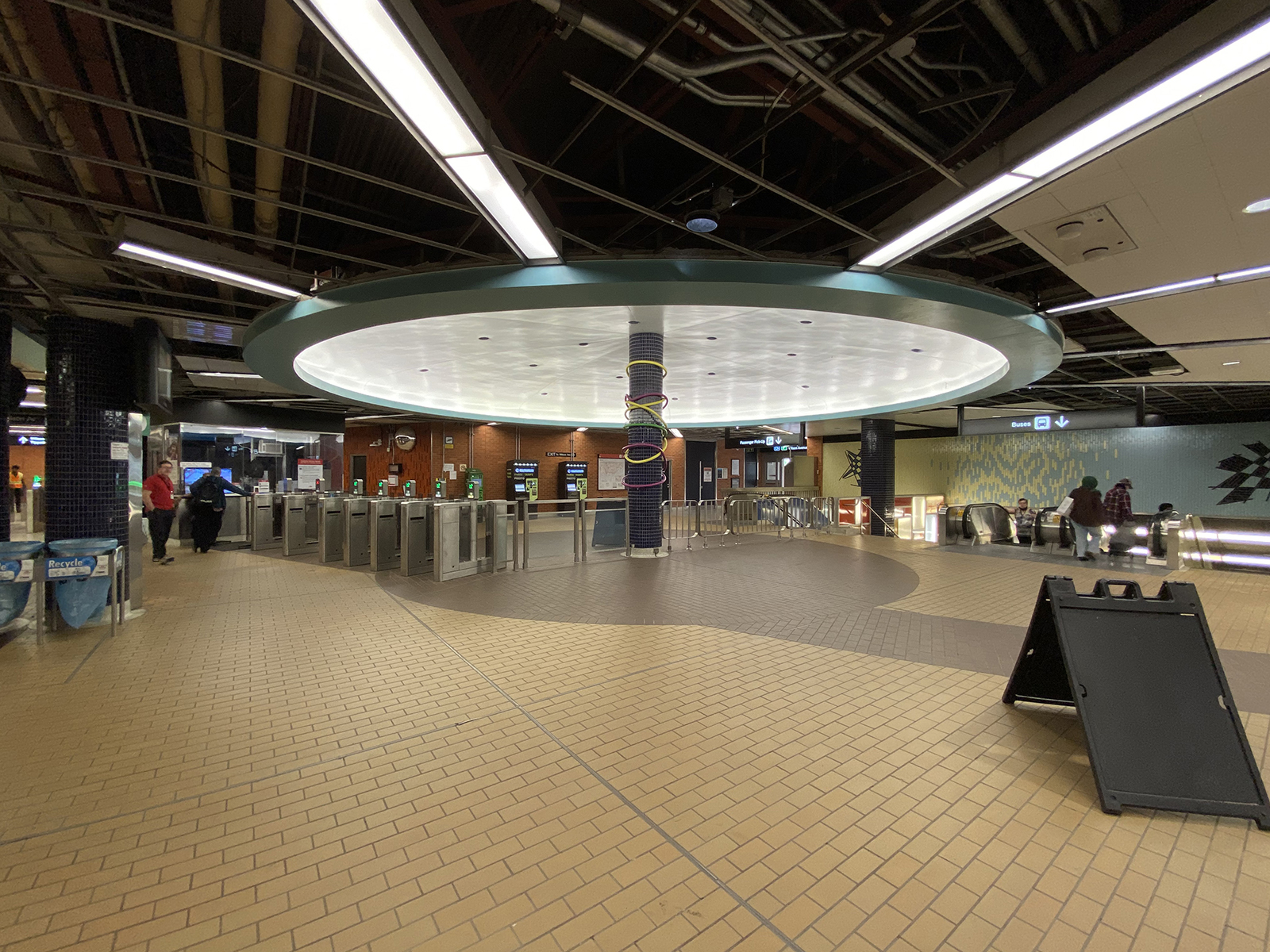
Outside the Lines in concourse

Wilson is one of two Yonge–University line stations on the west side of the line, along with St. Clair West, that were designed by the TTC's in-house architects.

The subway station building is a simple enclosed concrete structure built within the median of Allen Road where it crosses over Wilson Avenue. The mezzanine level connects by a maze of tunnels to the bus terminal, a kiss-and-ride facility and four commuter parking lots with a total of 2257 spaces. An additional island bus platform, no longer needed for the reduced number of connecting buses after the line was extended to Sheppard West Station, was mothballed and now serves as a storage area.

Wilson station is home to multiple art displays. A wall sculpture by Ted Bieler entitled Canyons is located at the mezzanine level. In late 2019, Outside the Lines was installed in multiple parts of the station. The display can be found in various locations, such as the subway platform level, walkway to bus bays, and on the second floor of the bus bays.

In October 2021, a mural named Daily Migration was unveiled. The mural is located on a wall of an entrance south of the station, west of Allen Road.

== Subway infrastructure in the vicinity ==
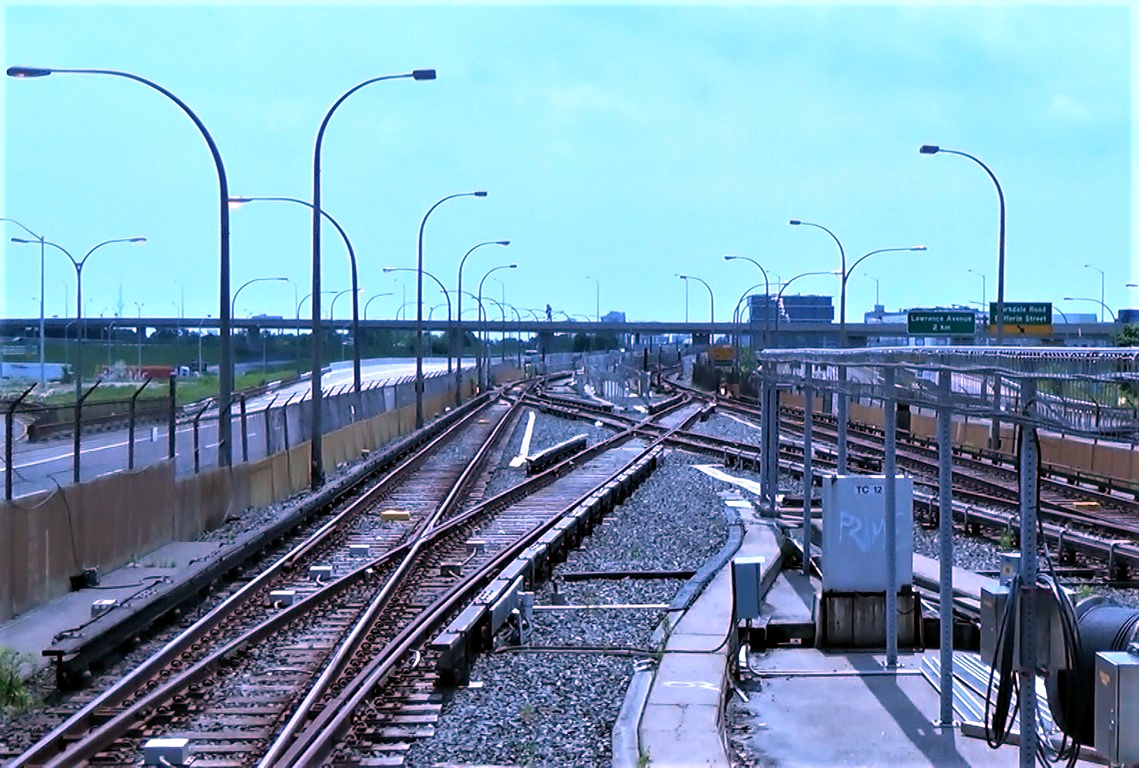
The crossover at Wilson station

Northwest of the station is the Wilson Yard, opened in 1977, which houses the system's largest subway marshalling yard having taken over Yonge-University line operations from Davisville Yard in 1993 and a large bus garage servicing most of the bus routes in north Toronto. The original yard access tracks form part of the mainline north to Sheppard West station, crossing under the southbound lanes of Allen Road and descending, as does the road itself, down to ground level. There is a diamond crossover south of the station, used to reverse trains when the station was a terminus, and still frequently used for short turning.

== Nearby landmarks ==
Nearby landmarks include a Costco store and the southern end of Downsview Park. Across Highway 401 is Yorkdale Shopping Centre. Large events at the park, such as World Youth Day 2002 and Molson Canadian Rocks for Toronto in 2003, have resulted in heavy use of Wilson station.

== Surface connections ==
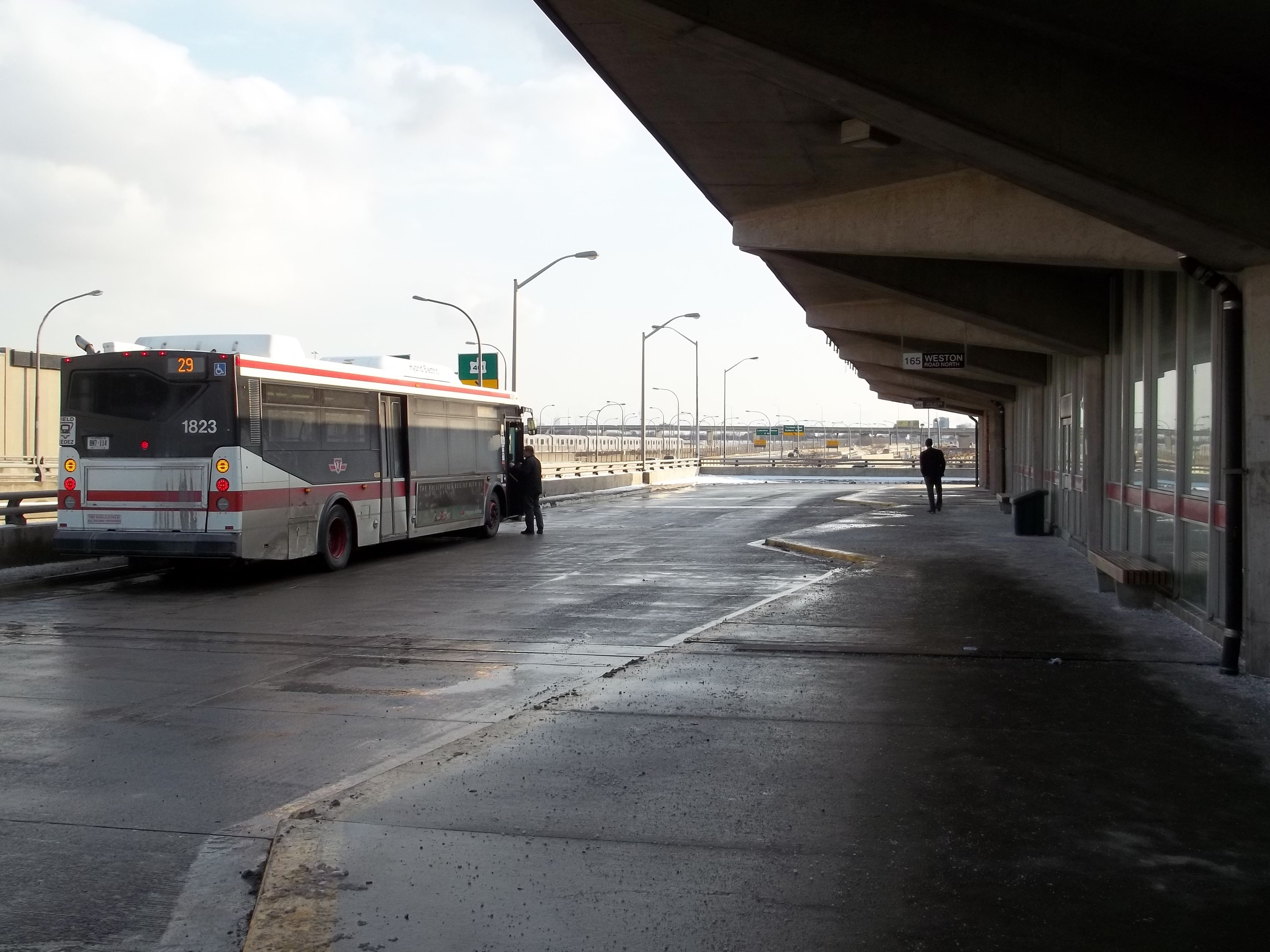
Wilson station bus terminal

Wilson station surface transit connections (upper level)
Bay number	Route	Name	Additional information
1	29A	Dufferin	Southbound to Exhibition Place (Dufferin Gate)
1	29C	Dufferin	Southbound to Exhibition Place (Princes' Gates)
1	929	Dufferin Express	Southbound to Exhibition Place (Dufferin Gate)
2	96A	Wilson	Westbound to Carrier Drive via Kipling Avenue and John Garland Boulevard
2	96B	Wilson	Westbound to Humberline Drive and Albion Road via Westhumber Boulevard and Martin Grove Road
2	96D	Wilson	Westbound to Carrier Drive and Westmore Drive
3	996	Wilson Express	Westbound to Humberwood Boulevard via Humber College (Weekday service)
4	165	Weston Rd North	Westbound to Steeles Avenue West
5	119A	Torbarrie	Westbound to Arrow Road via Clayson Road
5	119A	Torbarrie	Westbound to Arrow Road via Torbarrie Road
5	119B	Torbarrie	Westbound to Milvan Drive via Clayson Road and Fenmar Drive (AM rush hour service)
5	119B	Torbarrie	Westbound to Milvan Drive via Torbarrie Road Fenmar Drive (PM rush hour service)
6	118	Thistle Down	Westbound to Thistle Down Boulevard via Tandridge Crescent
7	101B	Downsview Park	Westbound to Finch West station via Stanley Greene Boulevard and Downsview Park station (Rush hour service)
8	120	Calvington	Westbound to Sheppard Avenue West and Jane Street
8	184	Ancaster Park	Westbound to De Havilland
N/A	329	Dufferin	Blue Night service; northbound to Steeles Avenue West and southbound to Exhibition Loop Overnight service stops on Transit Road and does not enter the station
N/A	396	Wilson	Blue Night service; eastbound to York Mills station and westbound to Martin Grove Road and Steeles Avenue West Overnight service stops on Wilson Avenue and does not enter the station

Wilson station surface transit connections (lower level)
Bay number	Route	Name	Additional information
1	165	Weston Rd North	Eastbound to York Mills station
2	96A/B/D	Wilson	Eastbound to York Mills station
3	996	Wilson Express	Eastbound to Scarborough Centre station via York Mills station (Weekday service)
4	104	Faywood	Northbound to Sheppard West station via Wilson Heights Boulevard
5	Wheel-Trans		
6	160	Bathurst North	Northbound to Centre Street
