= Sheppard West station =

Toronto subway station

Sheppard West
- Sheppard West station platform

General information
- Location: 1035 Sheppard Avenue West; Toronto, Ontario, Canada
- Coordinates: 43°44′57″N 79°27′44″W
- Platforms: Centre platform
- Tracks: 2
- Connections: TTC buses: 84 Sheppard West; 104 Faywood; 105 Dufferin North; 106 Sentinel; 107 Alness–Chesswood; 108 Driftwood; 329 Dufferin; 384 Sheppard West; 984 Sheppard West Express; YRT 105 Dufferin

Construction
- Structure type: Underground
- Parking: 632 spaces
- Accessible: Yes
- Architect: Adamson Associates Architects; Stevens Group Architects

Other information
- Website: Official station page

History
- Opened: March 30, 1996; 30 years ago
- Former names: Downsview (1996–2017)

Passengers
- 2023–2024: 19,495
- Rank: 37 of 70

Services
Preceding station	Toronto Transit Commission	Following station
Downsview Park towards Vaughan	Line 1 Yonge–University	Wilson towards Finch
Location

Sheppard West (formerly Downsview) is a subway station on Line 1 Yonge–University in Toronto, Ontario, Canada. The station, which is located near the intersection of Sheppard Avenue West and Allen Road, opened in 1996 in what was then the City of North York, and the commuter parking lot opened in July 2005. It was the northwestern terminus of the line for over two decades, until the opening of the Toronto–York Spadina subway extension on December 17, 2017.

When this station opened, it was among the first accessible stations of the Toronto subway system, and the first to be purpose-built as such. The station also features Wi-Fi service.

== History ==
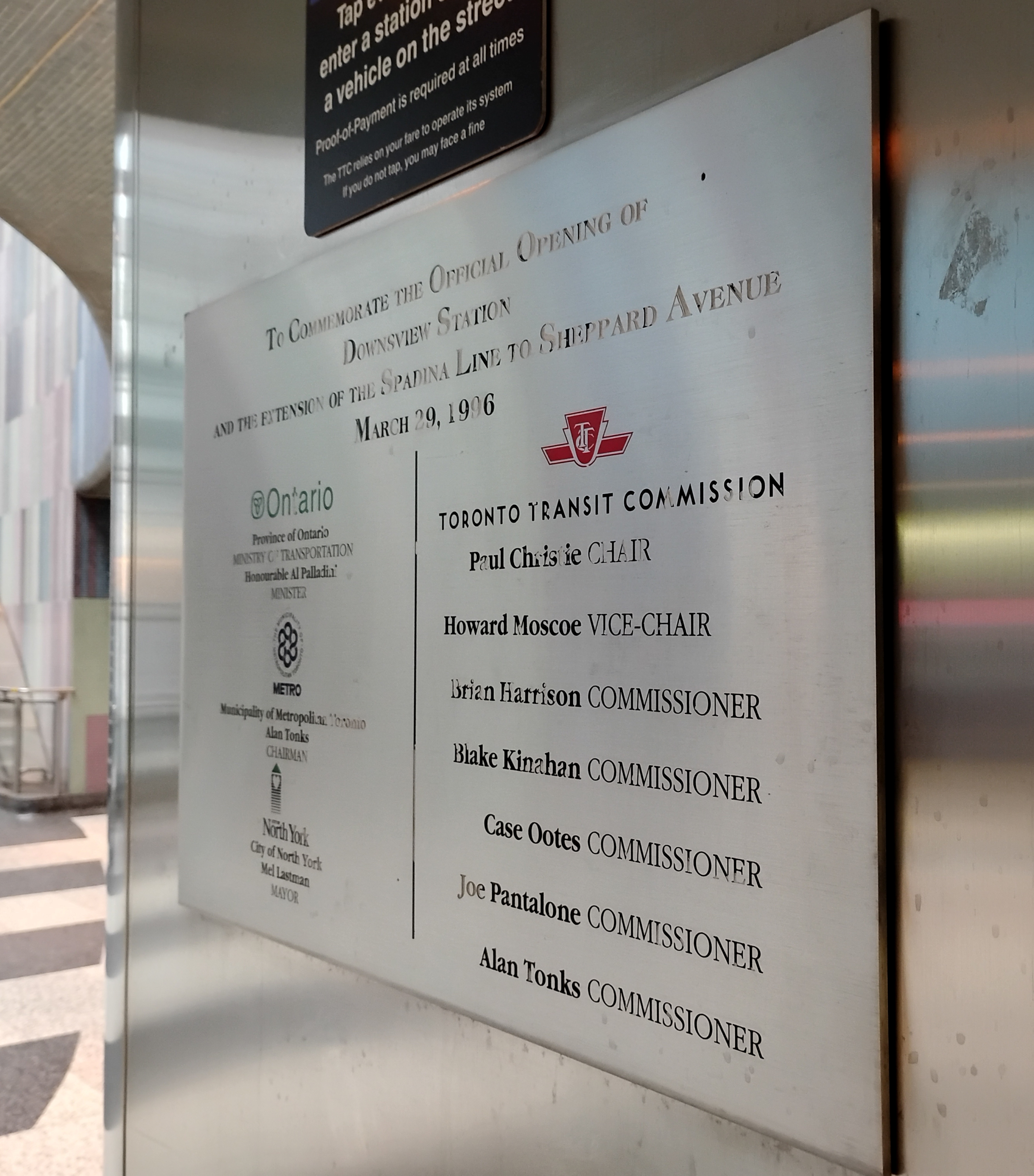
Plaque commemorating the 1996 opening of the station

Sheppard West station (then named Downsview) was opened in 1996 as a one-stop extension north of Wilson station. The reason for such a short extension was that the provincial government was offering funds for subway expansion as part of the Network 2011 plan, but was debating whether an extension should curve east to interline with a future phase of the proposed Sheppard Line (which was only approved with a western terminus at the-then Sheppard station on the Yonge line), or continue farther north as part of a loop to join the Spadina and Yonge line branches, either along the hydro corridor north of Finch Avenue or along Steeles Avenue via York University. The Sheppard line interlining idea was dropped in favour of the loop proposal – itself superseded in 2002 by the Vaughan extension plan, which was ultimately what was built. As a northward extension was chosen as part of the intervening loop plans, the short extension was built with the station constructed on a north–south alignment.

Construction of an access track to Wilson Yard branching off the mainline south of station began in 2009 but was mothballed after a tunnel was completed in 2010. Track was not laid and the tunnel was sealed off with hoarding. However, the tunnel was put into service in 2018 after completion of an ongoing expansion project to expand the Wilson Yard.

Concurrent with the opening of the extension on December 17, 2017, this station became one of the first eight stations to discontinue sales of legacy TTC fare media (tokens and tickets), previously available at the fare collector booth. Presto vending machines were available to sell Presto cards and to load funds onto them. On May 3, 2019, this station became one of the first ten stations to sell Presto tickets via Presto vending machines.

== Name ==
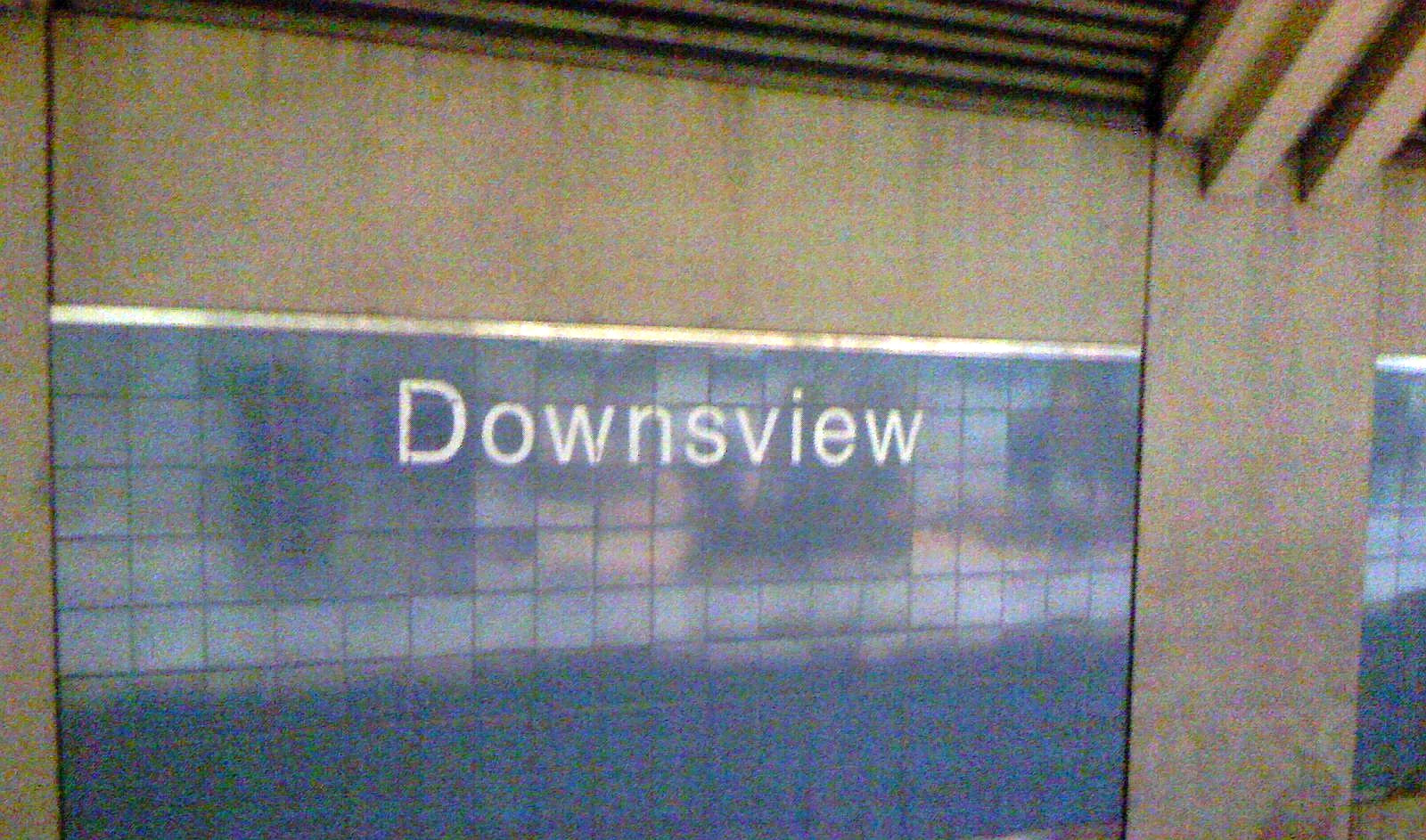
The former station name in mixed-case lettering on the platform wall

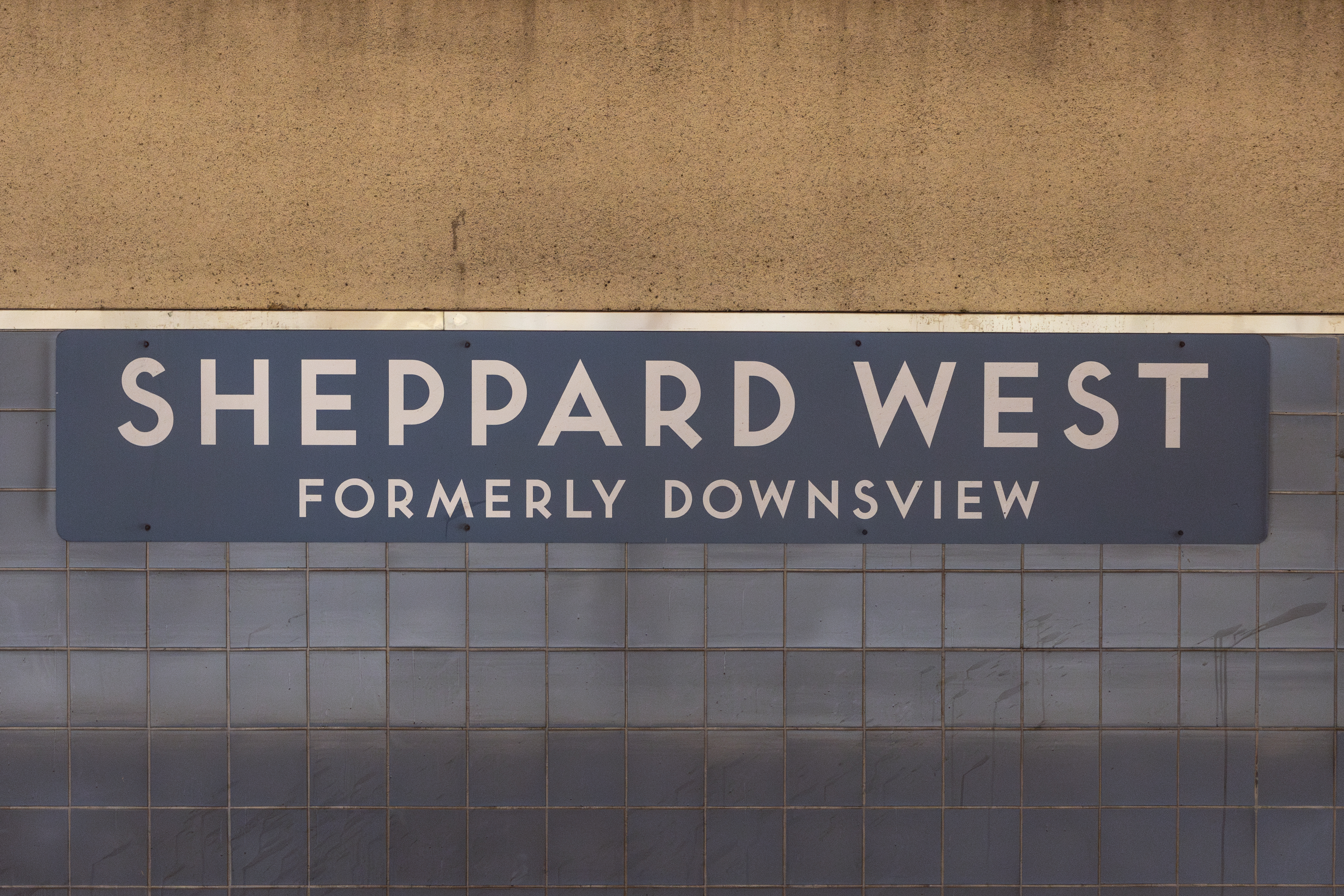
The current station name in uppercase lettering with "formerly Downsview" below

Originally, the TTC named the station Downsview due to its intended role as a transfer point for Line 4 Sheppard, which was planned to extend westward beyond Yonge Street and intersect with the western segment of Line 1. Downsview was the winning entry in a public naming competition. Another name considered was Wilson Heights.

On May 7, 2017, the station was renamed Sheppard West in preparation for the opening of Downsview Park station that same year. The TTC felt the name Downsview did not accurately reflect the station's location and would mislead passengers into thinking Downsview Park was easily accessible from the station, when in actuality, the upcoming northern station would offer a more direct connection to the park. The renaming cost $800,000, which was largely spent on updating the Toronto Rocket subway trains' automated announcement system and destination signs.

Prior to the renaming, the station was the only one in the system to have its name displayed in mixed-case lettering on the platform walls. The new name is rendered in uppercase lettering, using the traditional Toronto Subway typeface, on placards that obscure the old name. Smaller text at the bottom acknowledges the station's previous name.

== Architecture and art ==
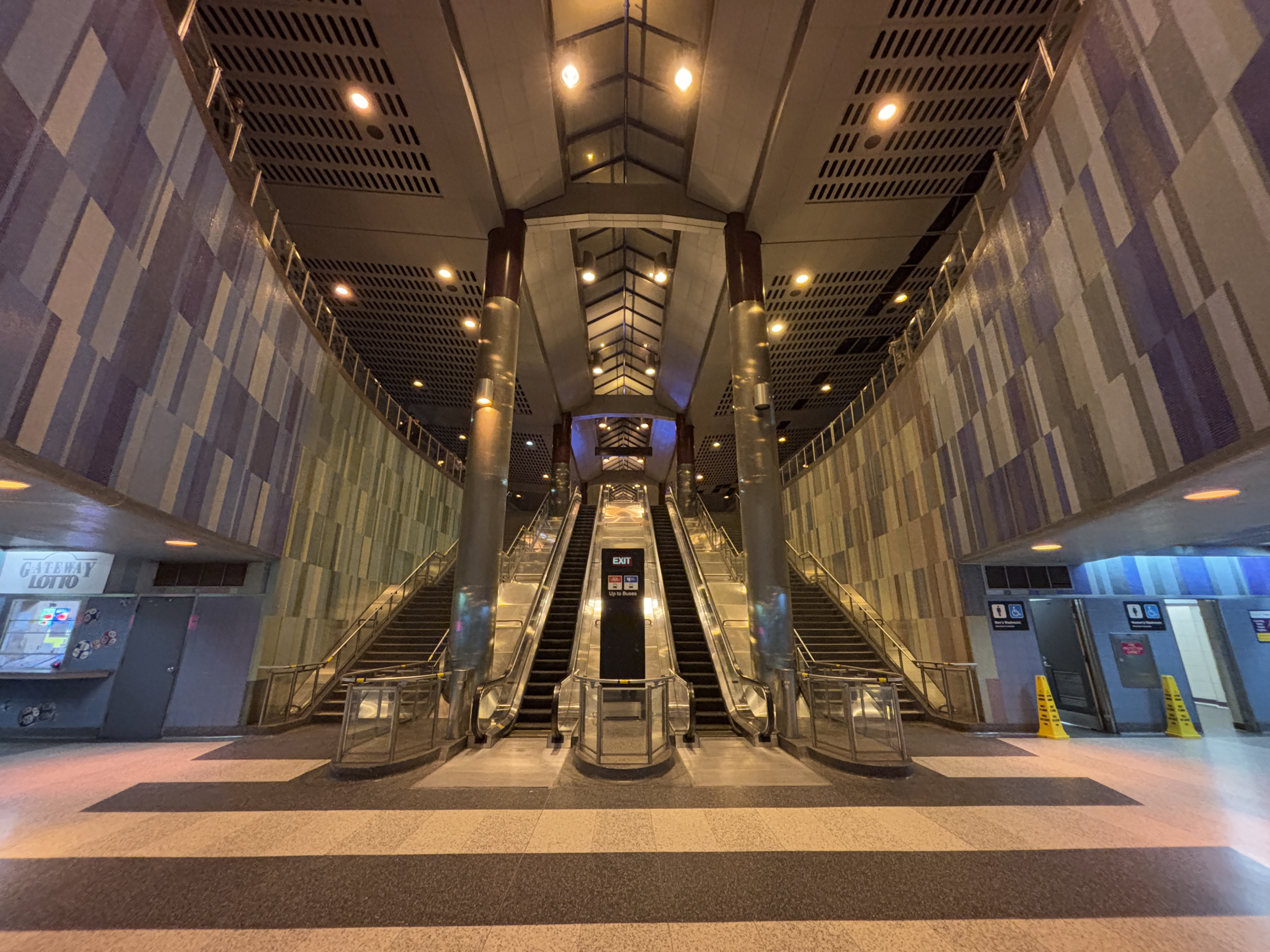
Wall mosaic Sliding Pi by Arlene Stamp

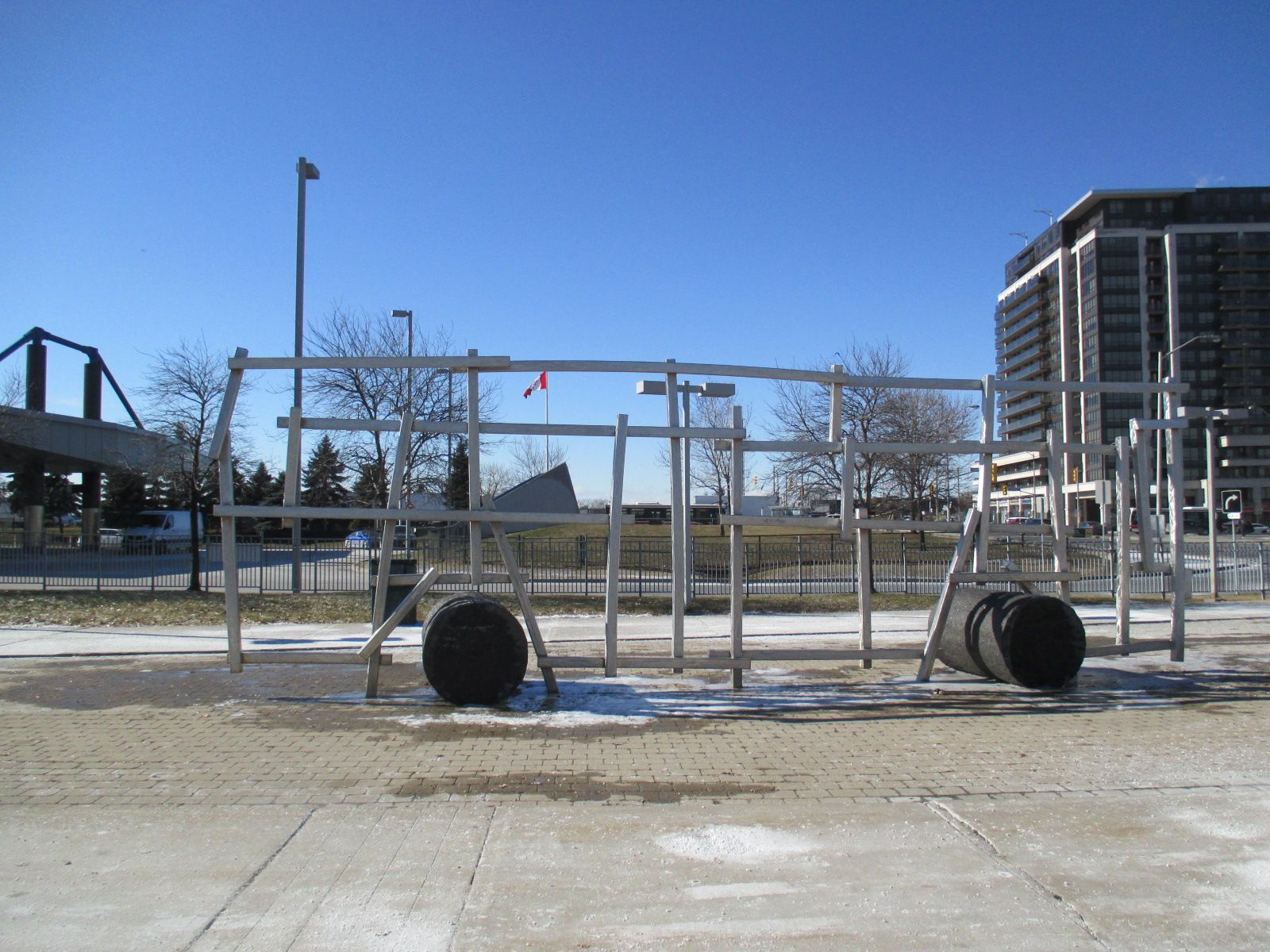
Boney Bus by John McKinnon

The station was designed by Adamson Associates Architects (above grade buildings and mezzanine) and The Stevens Group Architects (below grade). The subway platform lacks pillars and the ceiling is high and curved, evoking an aircraft hangar. High ceilings, skylights and an exceptionally large mezzanine make the station feel open and airy. Natural light reaches all areas of the station including the subway platform. The offset, glassed-in access walkway above the platform overlooks it and gives passengers views of passing trains below. Originally, the walkway was divided by a sinuous barrier as it ran through both the fare-paid and unpaid areas, with the unpaid half leading from an entrance at the north end of the station to the main fare concourse. The barrier was removed after this entrance had Presto card paddle fare gates installed in 2017. As a result, the north side entrance to the station is now a fully automated entrance and is only accessible to those using Presto.

The station features two pieces of artwork:

- Sliding Pi is a large scale wall mosaic by Calgary artist Arlene Stamp. It can be viewed when travelling between the bus platform and the mezzanine level. The work shows colourful overlapping rectangles with the amount of overlap mathematically determined by the digits in the number pi. The overlapping pattern is non-repeating and gives the impression to viewers that the rectangles are sliding to one side.
- Boney Bus, created by John McKinnon in 2000, is located in front of the station and consists of an abstract bus shape made from aluminum beams with basalt "wheels".

== Nearby landmarks ==
Nearby landmarks include Downsview Park, which was the site of the World Youth Day Papal Visit in 2002 and the SARSstock concert in 2003. It is the site of an airstrip once used by a military base (CFB Toronto), and by an aircraft manufacturer (DeHavilland), separating the station area from the original village of Downsview. William Lyon Mackenzie Collegiate Institute lies to the northeast in the Bathurst Manor neighbourhood.

== Subway infrastructure in the vicinity ==
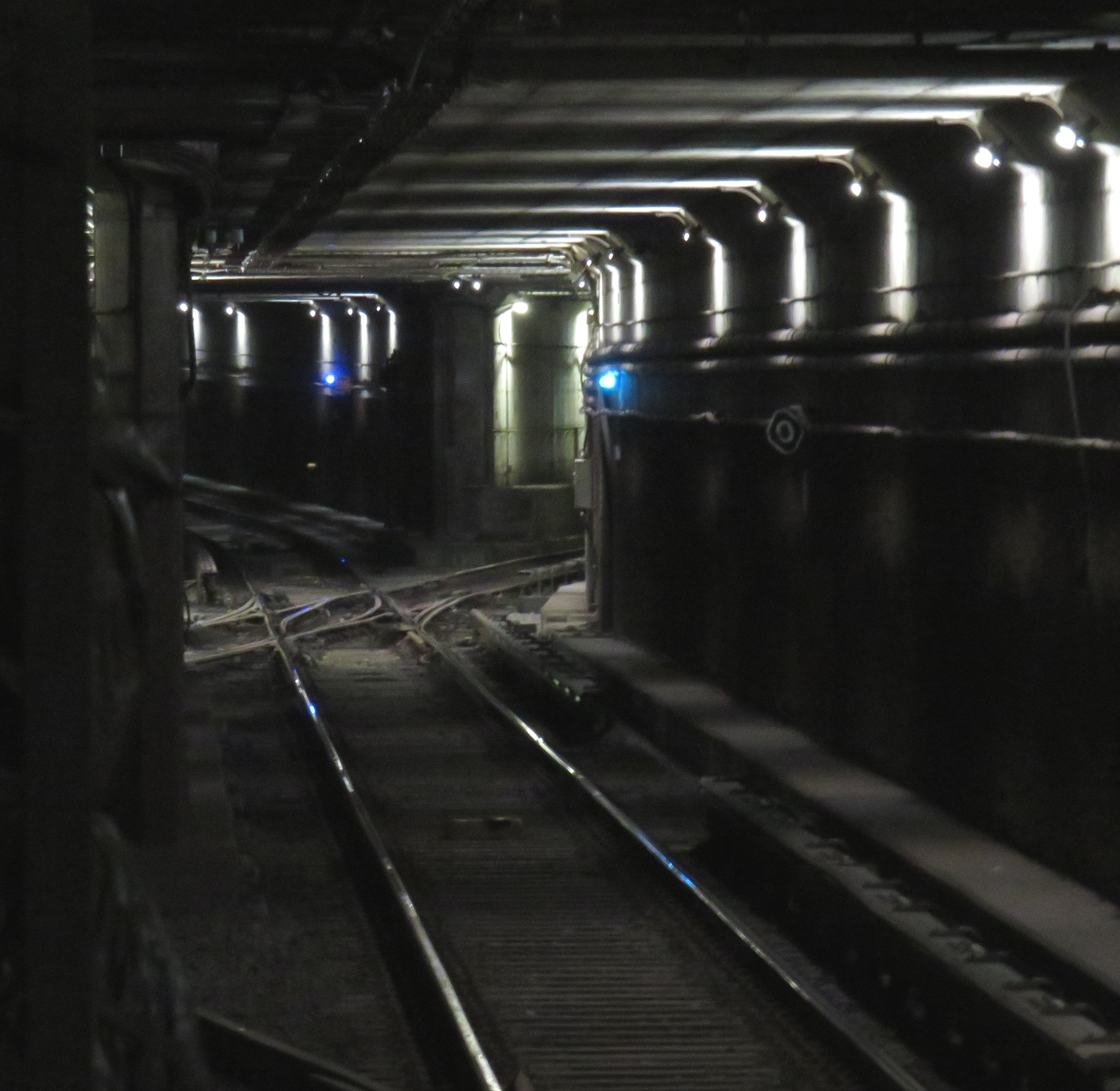
The connecting tunnel to Wilson Yard (diverging off to right)

The subway platform is located underground east of Allen Road. There is a complex crossover just south of the station, which incorporates a switch to a single track which branches off to the west in a tunnel to access Wilson Yard. The line continues underground for 750 metres (2,460 ft) and crosses to the west side of the road; after exiting at the Clanton Park Portal, the line runs on the surface past Wilson Yard and passes the original north access track to it. South of this point, the line partially uses what were originally the non-revenue yard access tracks north of Wilson, the previous terminal station. North of the station, the line turns sharply northwest to cross under Allen Road again, then leaves Allen Road's alignment and heads via a compound curve toward Downsview Park station. Immediately north of the station, there is a trackless third tunnel between the service tunnels, built when the station was a terminus to accommodate a potential third tail track, but which may now be used to house a potential pocket track.

== Surface connections ==
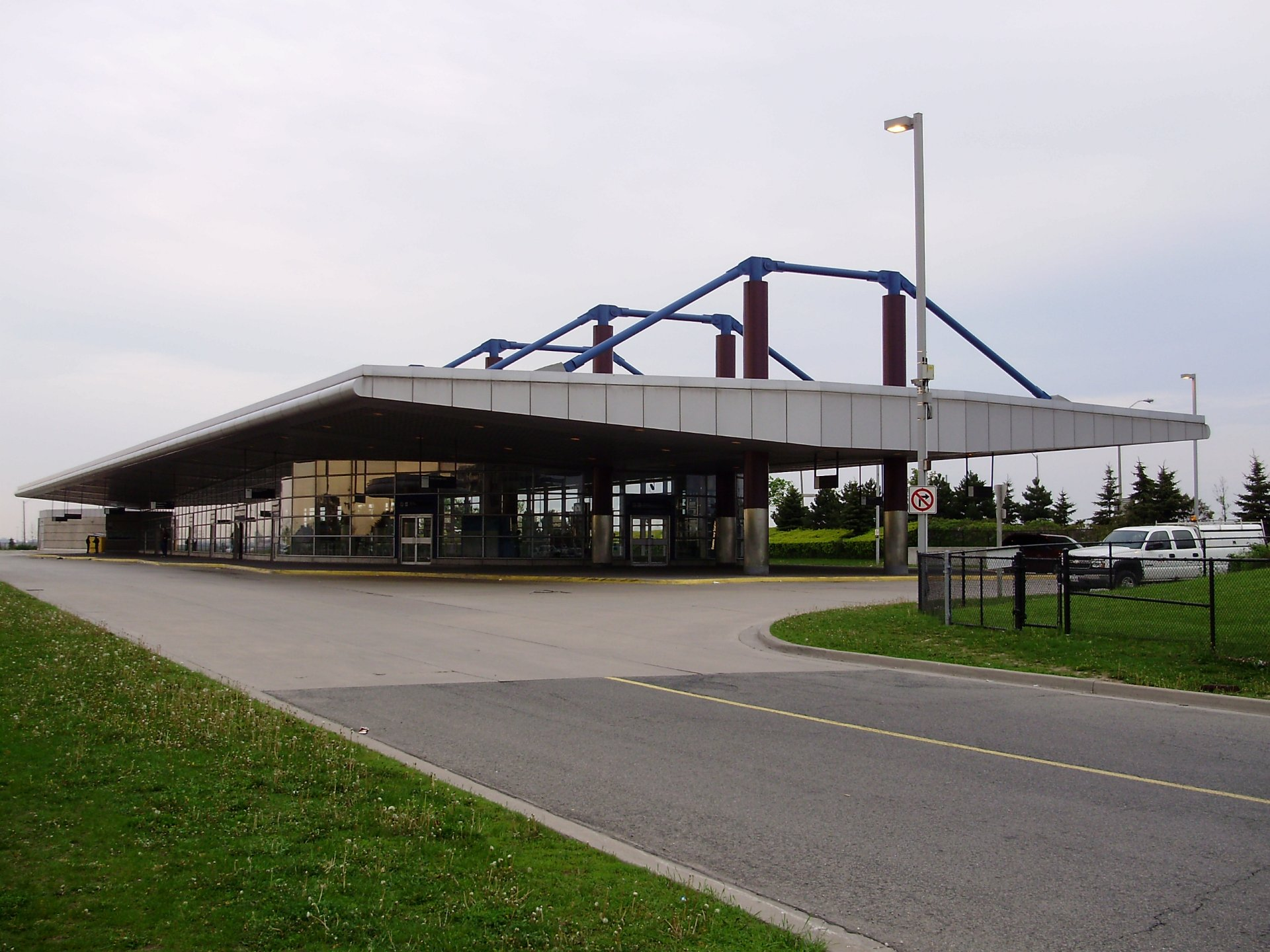
Bus platforms at Sheppard West station

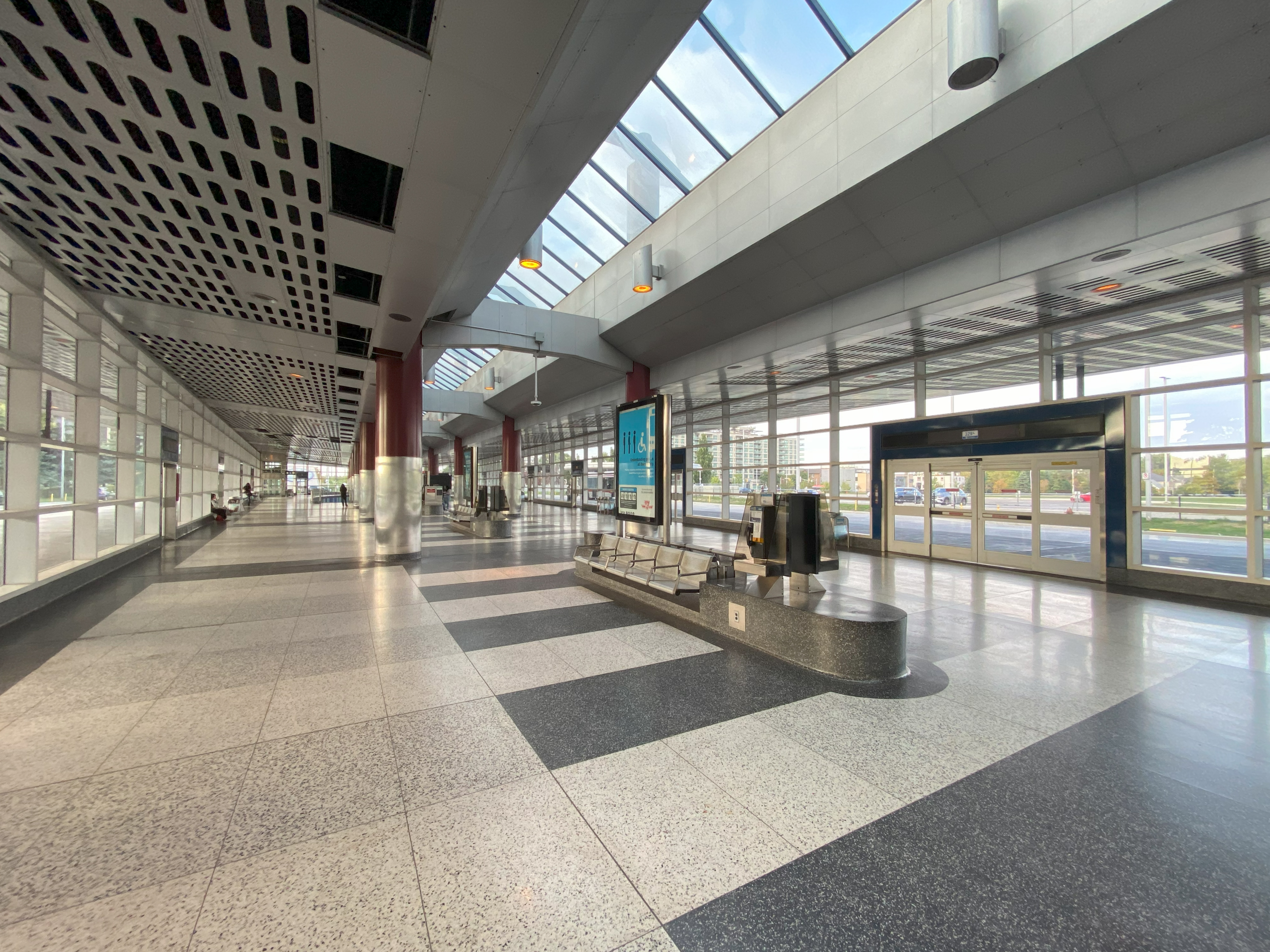
Interior of the bus platforms at Sheppard West station

Several TTC routes serve the station, as does one York Region Transit (YRT) route. For YRT bus riders, disembarking is done on-street outside the station as an additional fare is required – for cash payments – when transferring between the TTC and YRT.

Sheppard West station surface transit connections
Bay number	Route	Name	Additional information
1	84A/C/D	Sheppard West	Eastbound to Sheppard–Yonge station
2	984A	Sheppard West Express	Eastbound to Sheppard–Yonge station (Rush hour service)
3	106	Sentinel	Westbound to Pioneer Village station
4	Spare		
5	107	Alness–Chesswood	Northbound to Finch West station
6	984A	Sheppard West Express	Westbound to Weston Road (Rush hour service)
7	84A	Sheppard West	Westbound to Weston Road
7	84C	Sheppard West	Westbound to Steeles Avenue West via Arrow Road (Rush hour service)
7	84D	Sheppard West	Westbound to Pioneer Village station via Oakdale Road (Rush hour service)
8	108A	Driftwood	Westbound to Pioneer Village station via Grandravine Drive
8	108B	Driftwood	Westbound to Pioneer Village station via Arleta Avenue
9	Wheel-Trans		
10	105	Dufferin North	Northbound to Steeles Avenue West
11	104	Faywood	Southbound to Wilson station
12	Spare		
13	105	Dufferin	YRT route: Northbound to Rutherford Road or Major Mackenzie Drive West
N/A	329	Dufferin	Blue Night service; northbound to Steeles Avenue West and southbound to Exhibition Loop (Overnight service stops on Allen Road and does not enter the station)
N/A	384	Sheppard West	Blue Night service; westbound to Steeles Avenue West and Islington Avenue via Weston Road and eastbound to Sheppard–Yonge station (Overnight service stops on Sheppard Avenue and does not enter the station)

== Proposed Line 4 extension ==
The original plans for Line 4 Sheppard called for it to terminate at this station (then Downsview) and connect there with Line 1, but during construction in the late 1990s, the extension of Line 4 was halted after the first phase due to funding issues. Plans to extend Line 4 became inactive for many years, but some local politicians (such as former Toronto mayor Rob Ford) tried to revive the Line 4 expansion. In 2023, Metrolinx began public consultations for a potential revival of the extension of Line 4 west towards Sheppard West station, as well as east towards Scarborough.
