= Donlands station =

Toronto subway station

Donlands
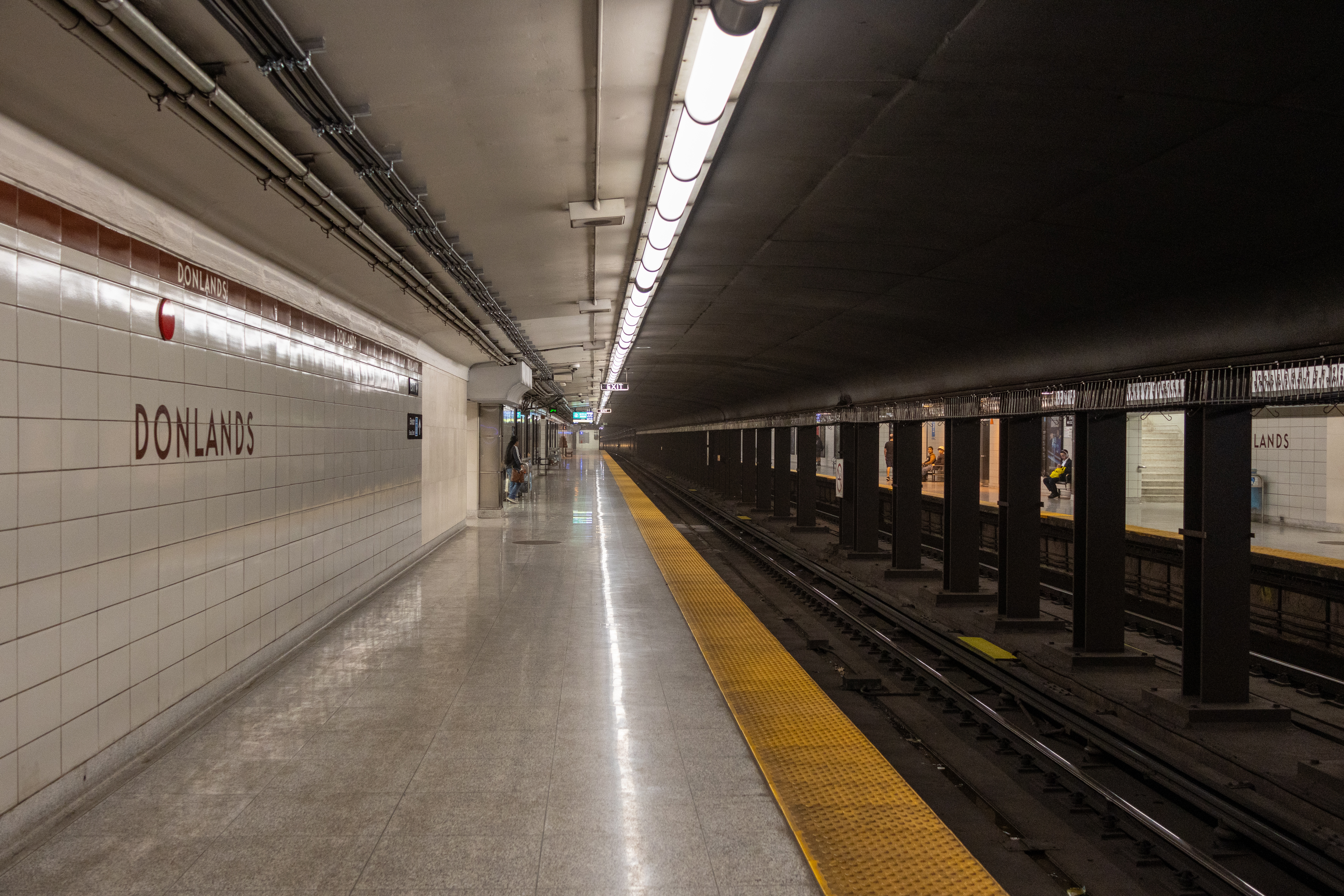

General information
- Location: 30 Donlands Avenue, Toronto, Ontario; Canada
- Coordinates: 43°40′52″N 79°20′16″W
- Platforms: Side platforms
- Tracks: 2
- Connections: TTC buses: 51 Leslie; 83 Jones; 300 Bloor - Danforth

Construction
- Structure type: Underground
- Accessible: Yes

Other information
- Website: Official station page

History
- Opened: 26 February 1966; 60 years ago
- Rebuilt: 2024

Passengers
- 2023–2024: 6,317
- Rank: 61 of 70

Services
Preceding station	Toronto Transit Commission	Following station
Pape towards Kipling	Line 2 Bloor–Danforth	Greenwood towards Kennedy
Location

Donlands is a station on Line 2 Bloor–Danforth of the Toronto subway. The station is located in Toronto's Greektown neighbourhood, at the southwest corner of Donlands Avenue and Strathmore Boulevard, just north of Danforth Avenue.

== History ==
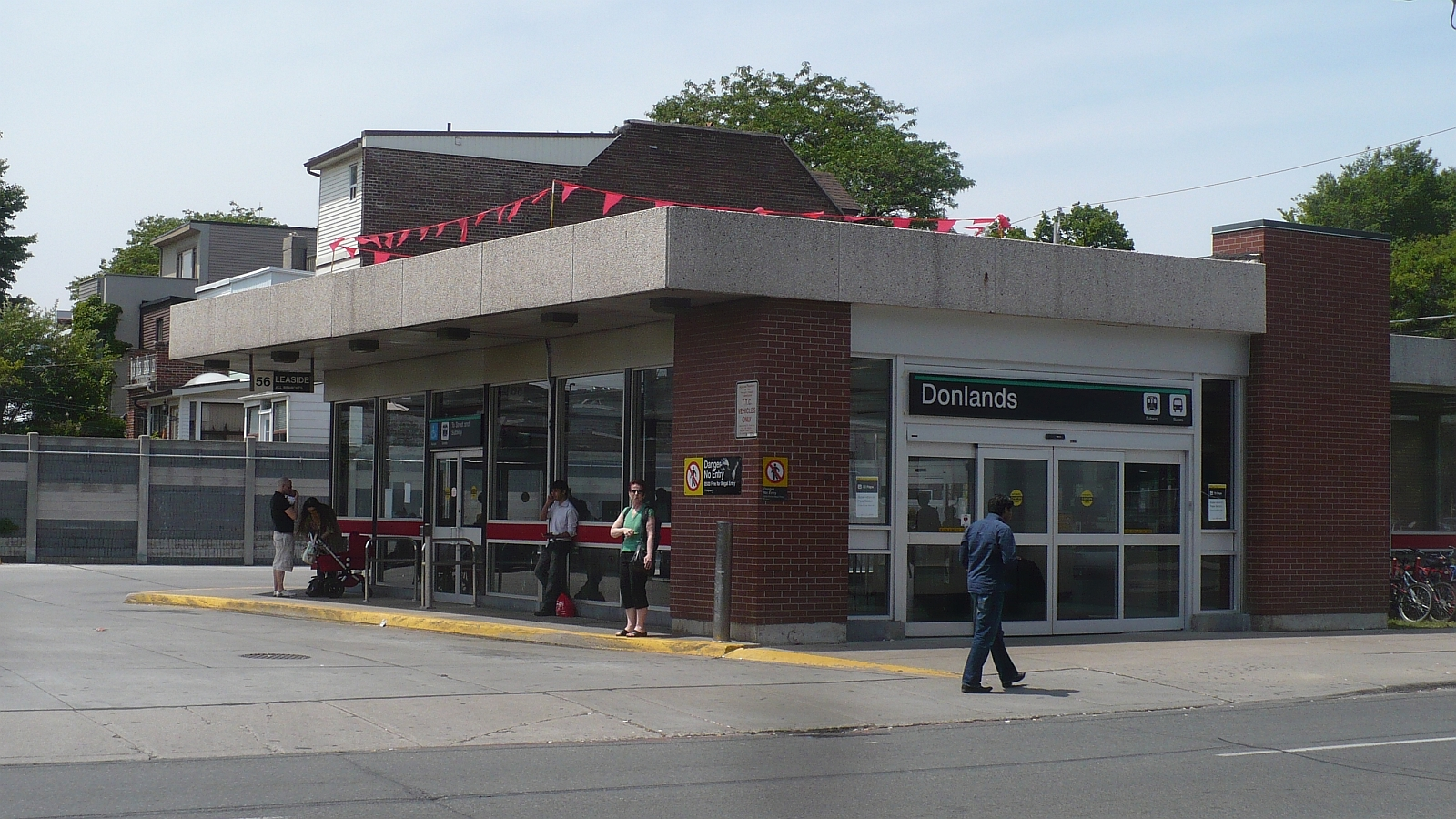
Station exterior

Donlands opened in 1966 as part of the original segment of the Bloor–Danforth line, between Keele station in the west and Woodbine station in the east. Originally only a small structure covered the stairs and escalator. The current building was constructed in the early 1980s and the fare-collection area was relocated from the concourse up to street level, which also brought the bus bays within the fare-paid zone.

On 6 August 1997, a pile of rubber pads being stored in the wye between Donlands station and Greenwood Yard caught fire. It was the TTC's first major subway incident after the 1995 Russell Hill subway accident. The fire shut down the Bloor–Danforth line from Broadview eastward; two thousand passengers had to be evacuated from a pair of trains and nearly 50 were taken to hospital for smoke inhalation. Over 200 emergency personnel responded to the fire.

== Subway infrastructure ==
Between Donlands and Greenwood stations is a full grade-separated, double-track, underground wye junction, allowing trains from either direction to access the TTC's Greenwood Yard, which is on the surface south of Danforth Avenue.

== Nearby landmarks ==
Nearby landmarks include the Madinah Masjid, the Toronto District School Board's Kapapamahchakwew - Wandering Spirit School (formerly First Nations School of Toronto/Eastern Commerce Collegiate Institute), Subway Academy I, and Wilkinson Junior Public School. The station is located near the eastern limits of Toronto's Greektown neighbourhood, which is also served by Pape, Chester and Broadview stations to the west.

== Second exit ==
In June 2010, the TTC announced plans to add second exits to two subway stations on the Bloor–Danforth line. These exits were recommended after a fire safety audit due to the stations only having one primary means of emergency access.

The planned construction would have seen a new exit-only structure built at surface level on Dewhurst Boulevard. In order to build the exit, the TTC planned to expropriate residential land and demolish a home in the area. This decision proved to be controversial in the neighbourhoods affected and after some public outcry, the TTC stated that they would review their plans.

The TTC accepted the City Ombudsman's report that these projects were not handled well by staff on two counts: community outreach, consultation and explanations about the technical and engineering decisions made by staff; and how the TTC communicated with residents whose properties were most affected.

Station improvements were deferred and a complete environmental assessment was to be done for the Downtown Relief Line first, and any potential implications for Donlands station were to be evaluated at that time. As of 2021, the successor to the Downtown Relief Line, the Ontario Line, is planned to interchange with Line 2 at Pape station instead of Donlands.

== Station access upgrades ==
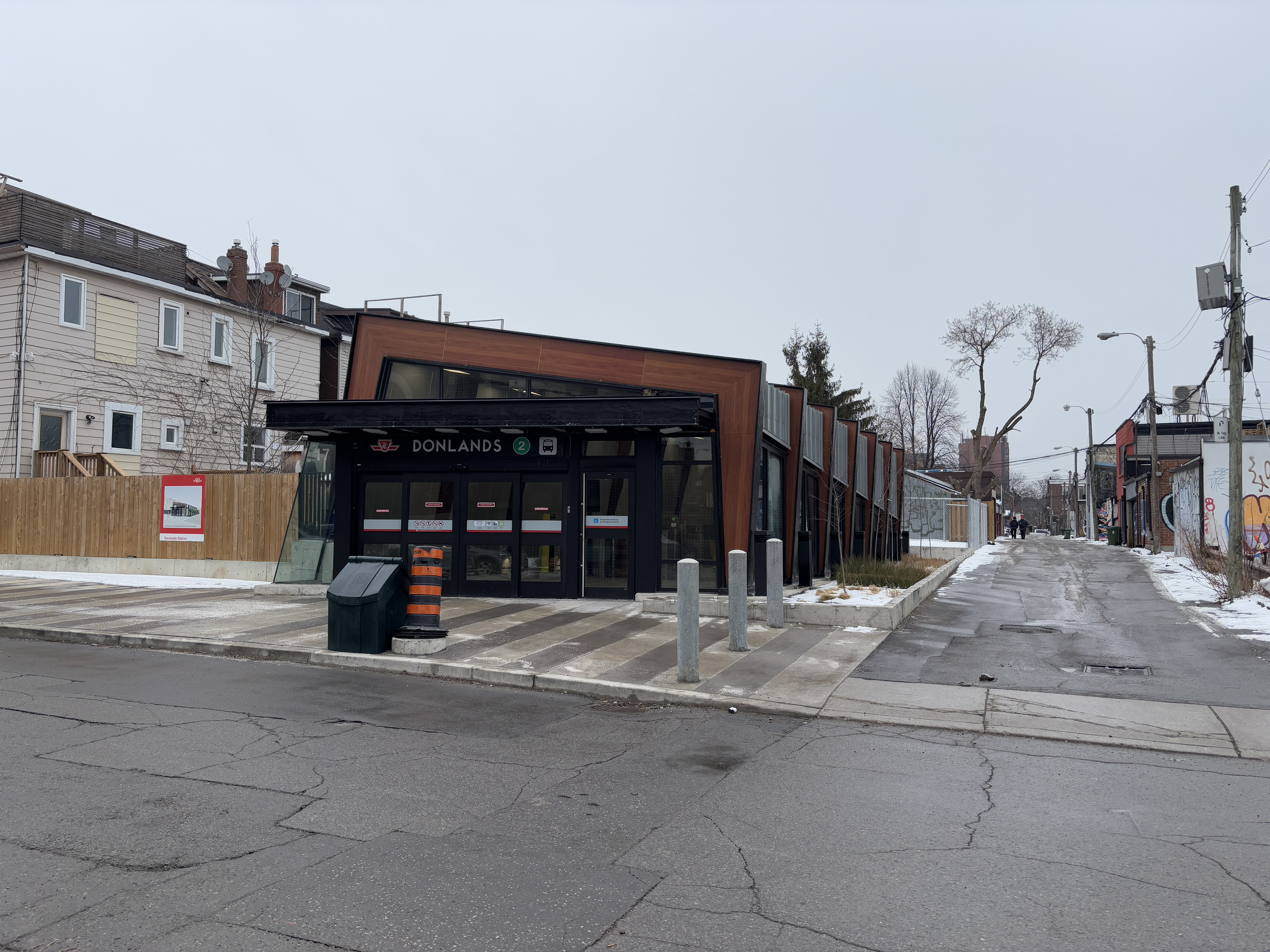
New second entrance and exit

In early 2021, construction work on the second exit, access tunnels and elevators at Donlands station had begun. The second exit is located at 17/19 Dewhurst Boulevard; a residential building was demolished in late 2020 to make way for the second exit. Tunnels from the second exit building extended under Dewhurst and Strathmore Boulevards, connecting to the western end of the existing platforms. The surface–concourse–eastbound platform elevator is located within the existing station property on the southwest corner of Donlands Avenue and Strathmore Boulevard, while the concourse–westbound platform elevator is located underneath the playground of a daycare centre on the northwest corner of the same intersection. The project was completed in August 2024.

== Surface connections ==
TTC routes serving the station include:

Bay number	Route	Name	Additional information
1	51A	Leslie	Northbound to Leslie station via Laird station
1	51B	Leslie	Northbound to Don Mills Road and Lawrence Avenue East via Laird station
2	Spare		
3	83	Jones	Southbound to Commissioners Street
