= Parliament Street (Toronto) =

Street in Toronto, Ontario, Canada

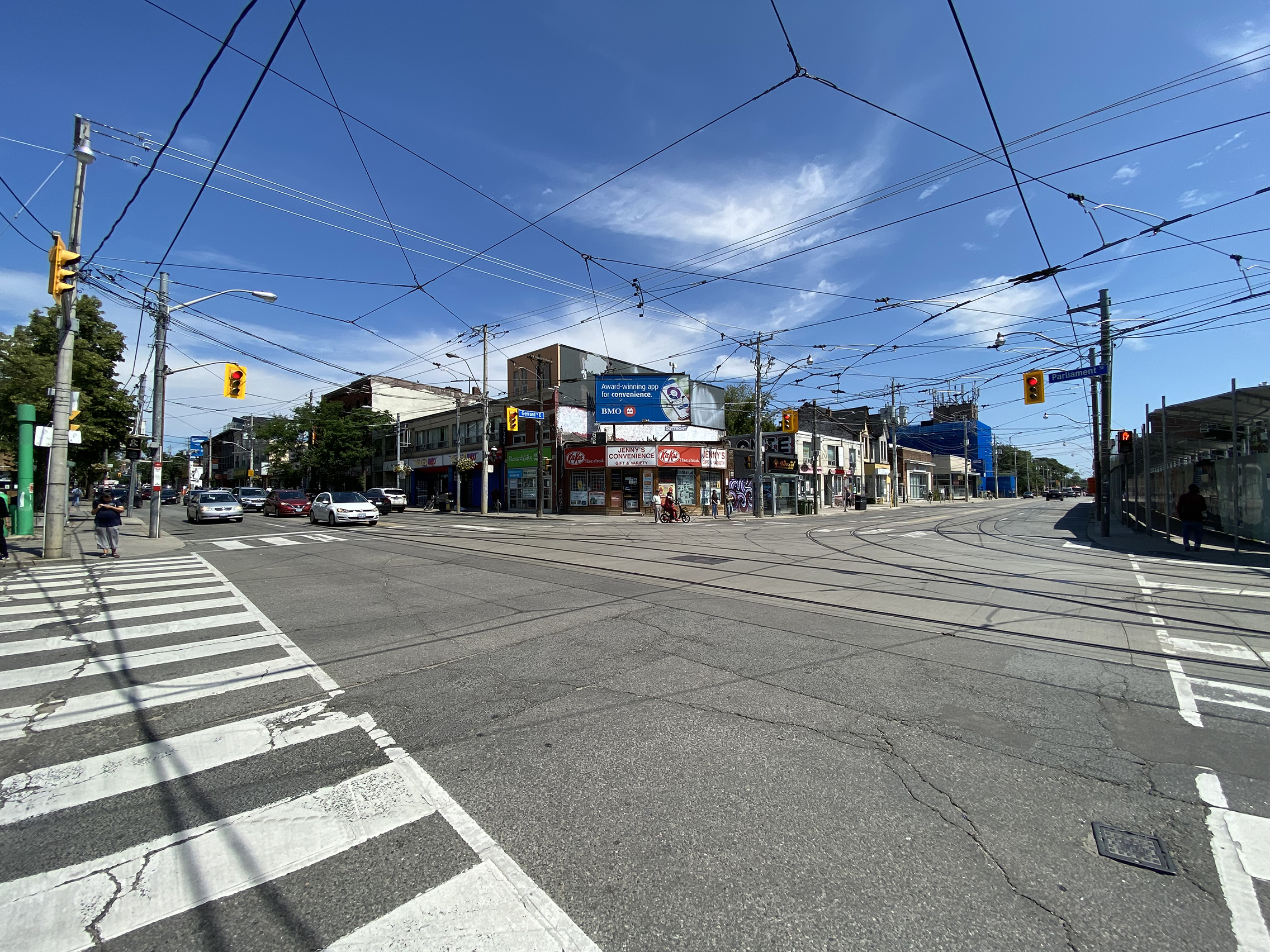
- Parliament Street at Gerrard Street East in 2023

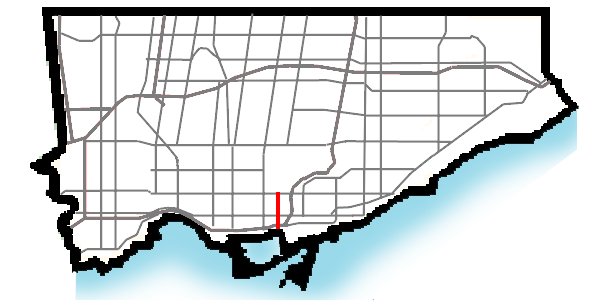
- Maintained by: City of Toronto
- Location: Toronto
- South end: Queens Quay
- North end: Bloor Street

Other
Nearby arterial roads in Toronto
← Sherbourne Street	Broadview Avenue →

Parliament Street is a north–south street in the eastern part of downtown Toronto, Ontario, Canada. The street runs from Bloor Street to Queens Quay and is the first major street west of the Don River.

== History ==
The street is named for the Parliament Buildings of Upper Canada, built in 1794 on the south side of Front Street (originally as King Street and then Palace Street) just west of Parliament Street.

=== Original Parliament Street ===
Berkeley Street was the first "Parliament Street", until the city moved Parliament Street one block east. The street ran from Lot Street (now Queen Street East) to Palace Street.

=== Second Parliament Street ===
The current street route follows a trail originally cut through the woods by Governor John Graves Simcoe to his summer house on the Don River, Castle Frank. While Parliament Street was originally one of the most important boulevards in the city, the street now primarily passes post-industrial areas and housing projects.

Named after legislative buildings later burned to the ground by invading American forces, Parliament Street has been a setting for growth and change for more than 200 years. Shaped by a combination of natural features (Lake Ontario and the Don River Valley) and the built environment (Corktown, Cabbagetown and Regent Park), Parliament Street is a reflection not only of the history of Toronto but of Canada as well.

Established in 1791, the Province of Upper Canada moved its capital to York (Toronto) in 1793. Needing a place to house his new government, the first Lieutenant Governor of Upper Canada (Governor Simcoe) commissioned the construction of two modest Georgian buildings that were dubbed the “Palaces of Government”. Ontario's first Parliament was located on the shore of the bay, just east of Berkeley and south of present-day Front Street. Completed in 1797, the red-brick structures were plagued by bad luck. They were burned by invading American forces in 1813, rebuilt in 1820 and burned again in 1824 (this time by accident). The fires and the “marshy” air by the lake (which was thought to be unhealthy) influenced the relocation of the parliament buildings, although the name of the street remains to this day.

Parliament Street evolved as a Victorian main street serving nearby neighbourhoods (such as working-class Corktown and Cabbagetown), institutions (churches, cemeteries and the Toronto General Hospital on Gerrard) and businesses (breweries, manufacturers and small shops). During the time of William Lyon Mackenzie, development was concentrated south of Queen Street; it moved northward to Winchester Street by about 1885 and Bloor Street by 1895. The Victorian character of these buildings, supplemented by Edwardian commercial structures, underlies today's streetscape.

For several decades, the area between Gerrard and Wellesley Streets offered the attractions of downtown in a residential area. The Eclipse Theatre, the Winchester Hotel and clothier Harry Rosen offered entertainment, lodging, and clothing to the area's residents. Grocery, hardware and jewelry stores, restaurants and barbershops served the community, making it a thriving part of Toronto. As upscale businesses moved to the city's downtown core, Parliament Street became less glamorous.

Major change came to Parliament Street in the mid-20th century. The construction of Regent Park, Moss Park, and St. James Town brought tower block development, new businesses and a multicultural population. Equally important was local resistance to demolishing remaining Victorian buildings to make way for more high-rises. The result is a mixed-use, mixed-income community still focused on its main street.

The last 15 years have brought new life to Parliament Street. New businesses and attractions (from the Distillery District to the 69-acre (28 ha) revitalization of Regent Park) and restorations such as the Toronto Police, 51 Division (West Gas Purifying House, 1899) and the Winchester Hotel (formerly Lakeview Hotel, 1888) have given the community a sense that Parliament Street is returning to its historical roots as an area of intersecting residential, commercial and cultural significance.

== Route description ==
Parliament Street begins at Queen's Quay (and also as Parliament Street Slip), close to the lake shore and Toronto Harbour in an area once the centre of Toronto industry but now largely abandoned. North of the Gardiner Expressway, Parliament marks the eastern border of the St. Lawrence neighbourhood, a former industrial area that has been redeveloped as mixed-income and mixed-use community following the precepts of Jane Jacobs. To the east of Parliament is the Distillery District, a cluster of Victorian industrial buildings that have been converted into a commercial and cultural centre.

North of Queen Street, Parliament passes by the Moss Park and Regent Park housing projects. Both are a series of apartment towers built during the slum clearance programs of the 1950s and 1960s. Regent Park was the first such project in Toronto, but has been beset by high crime and poverty and is in the process of renovation.

Between Gerrard and Wellesley, Parliament serves as the main commercial area for the Cabbagetown neighbourhood. Cabbagetown was originally a poor Irish-immigrant neighbourhood, but recent decades have seen rapid gentrification.

North of Wellesley and west of Parliament is St. James Town a cluster of apartment towers which is the highest-density neighbourhood in Canada. On the other side of the street is St. James Cemetery, one of Toronto's oldest cemeteries.

== Public transit ==
Parliament Street was served by the Toronto Transit Commission's Parliament streetcar line from 1910 to 1966. It ran from Parliament Loop (south of King Street) north to Viaduct Loop, near the current site of the Castle Frank station. Streetcar service ended in 1966 with the opening of the Bloor-Danforth subway, and was replaced by the 65 Parliament bus. Streetcar tracks and overhead wires remain between Carlton and King Streets as the TTC's 506 Carlton still travels along Parliament between Carlton and Gerrard streets, and diversions of other streetcar lines sometimes take them along sections of this street.

Today the 65 serves the entirety of Parliament Street from Lake Shore Blvd to Bloor Street. The 94 Wellesley bus also travels along Parliament between Wellesley and Bloor on its way to and from Castle Frank station, into which both the 65 Parliament and 94 Wellesley routes feed. As mentioned earlier, the 506 Carlton uses Parliament from Carlton to Gerrard.

== Landmarks ==
Landmarks and notable sites along Parliament from south to north

Landmark	Cross street	Notes	Image
Victory Soya Mills Silos	Queen's Quay	Abandoned industrial silos; currently a part of the waterfront revitalization	
Distillery District	Mill St	Former distillery; now a cultural district	
Moss Park	Queen St	Housing project	
Regent Park	Dundas St	Housing project (undergoing renewal)	
Winchester Hotel	Winchester	Historic former hotel	
St. James Town	Wellesley Street		
St. James Cemetery	Wellesley Street		

== See also ==
- Legislative Assembly of Upper Canada
