= National Lampoon's Senior Trip =

- Theatrical release poster
- Directed by: Kelly Makin
- Written by: Roger Kumble; I. Marlene King
- Produced by: Wendy Grean
- Starring: Matt Frewer; Valerie Mahaffey; Tommy Chong
- Cinematography: François Protat
- Edited by: Stephen Lawrence
- Music by: Steve Bartek
- Production companies: New Line Cinema; Alliance Communications
- Distributed by: New Line Cinema
- Release date: September 8, 1995
- Running time: 91 minutes
- Country: United States
- Language: English
- Box office: $4,686,937 (worldwide)

National Lampoon's Senior Trip is a 1995 American adventure comedy film for the National Lampoon magazine franchise, directed by Kelly Makin. This is Jeremy Renner's film debut.

== Plot ==
At Fairmount High School, Ohio in the suburbs of Dayton, a group of teenage students begin their school day with an assembly featuring a band called "High on Life". As the band continues to play onstage, Mark "Dags" D'Agastino and Reggie Barry decide to sabotage the assembly by exposing the band for lip syncing. After a typing class (during which the teacher suffers a heart attack and dies), the seniors cut school and throw a party at Principal Moss' house. Moss finds out about the party from student body president Steve Nisser. He returns home and catches them, then gives the group detention, during which he forces them to write a letter to the President of the United States, explaining what is wrong with the education system.

The next day various newspaper station vans show up at the school with the announcement that the President, amazingly, enjoyed their letter, and has invited them to Washington, D.C. to discuss it. In reality, the invitation is a plot devised by the corrupt U.S. Senator Lerman to humiliate the President.

The trip underway, the bus stops at a convenience store, where Dags and Reggie lock Moss in a flooded washroom, and they steal alcoholic beverages. They are pursued by Travis, a crazed Star Trek fan and crossing guard, who hitches a ride with an Asian family. Principal Moss falls into a deep sleep after taking pills given to him by bus driver Red. With Moss passed out, the students throw a party on the bus, and Carla Morgan, the school slut, applies makeup to the unconscious Moss.

The next day, as the bus is pursued by Travis and the police, Red, the driver, dies from an apparent drug overdose, and the bus nearly plows into a lake. Dags manages to stop the bus in time, but the pursuers' car lands in the water and Travis escapes.

Arriving at Washington, the group checks into a hotel and decides to take a class photo at a cemetery. Miosky lights a fart on J. Edgar Hoover's flame to distract Travis. That night, the seniors secretly lace a box of chocolates with tequila and give it to the chaperone, Miss Milford. Under the influence, Milford seduces Moss. The students seize this opportunity to crash a party at the hotel next door. When Steve Nisser threatens to blow the whistle, Dags orders Miosky to "take care of him". While the other students enjoy the party, Lisa Perkins takes Dags to the rooftop where she seduces him. The next day, she discovers the plot to use the students to embarrass the President.

Senator Lerman surprises Moss and Milford, who wake up, shocked at finding themselves in a room together. When they go to collect the group for their meeting with the President, they find only a trussed-up Steve Nisser. Moss and Milford locate the missing students, and are informed of Lerman's plot. The senator kidnaps Miosky and takes him to the White House with the others in hot pursuit. At the White House, when the senator makes insulting remarks about the seniors, Principal Moss, in spite of everything, unexpectedly stands up for them. The senator's plot is exposed, and the seniors return home. The film ends with a montage of the characters, telling where they end up in later life.

== Cast ==
- Jeremy Renner as Mark "Dags" D'Agostino
- Eric "Sparky" Edwards as Miosky
- Matt Frewer as Principal Todd Moss
- Tommy Chong as Red
- Valerie Mahaffey as Miss Tracy Milford
- Rob Moore as Reggie Barry
- Lawrence Dane as Senator John Lerman
- Kevin McDonald as Travis Lindsey
- Michael Blake as Herbert Jones
- Tara Strong as Carla Morgan (credited as Tara Charendoff)
- Nicole de Boer as Meg Smith
- Sergio Di Zio as Steve Nisser
- Fiona Loewi as Lisa Perkins
- Kathryn Rose as Wanda Baker
- Danny Smith as Barry "Virus" Kemmer
- Kay Tremblay as Mrs. Winston
- Wayne Robson as Frank Hardin
- George R. Robertson as President Davis
- Rachel Wilson as Teen Girl (Susie)
- Ingrid Kavelaars as Twin
- Kim Schraner as Caroline
- Warren Davis as Senator Duffield

== Production ==
The Winchester Hotel in Cabbagetown, Toronto is the exterior of the hotel they stay at in D.C.. Alliance of Canadian Cinema, Television and Radio Artists not Screen Actors Guild or American Federation of Television and Radio Artists and Directors Guild of Canada not Directors Guild of America receive credit.

== Reception ==
=== Box office ===
The film opened to $2,184,901 from 1,397 theaters with an average of $1,563 per site. The United States generated $4,686,937, 100% of the total gross of the film.

=== Critical response ===
The film received overwhelmingly negative reviews, earning a 0% approval rating on Rotten Tomatoes website, but it currently holds a B grade at Yahoo! Movies.
