= Prince Edward Viaduct =

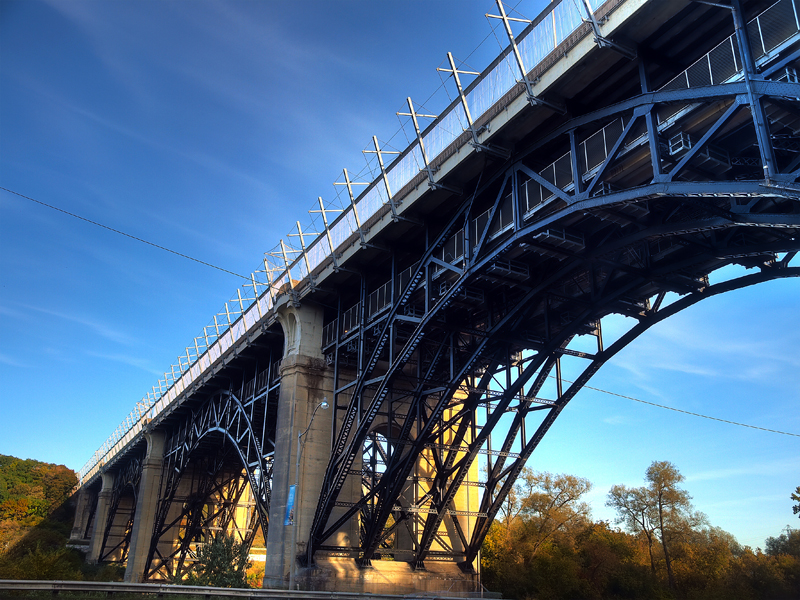
- Coordinates: 43°40′31″N 79°21′50″W
- Carries: Upper: 5 vehicle lanes and 2 bicycle lanes of Bloor Street East / Danforth Avenue; Lower: 2 tracks of the Toronto subway
- Crosses: Don River
- Locale: Toronto, Ontario, Canada
- Other name: Bloor Street Viaduct
- Maintained by: Toronto Transportation Services, Toronto Transit Commission

Characteristics
- Design: double-deck arch bridge
- Total length: 494 metres (1,620 feet)
- Clearance below: 40 metres (131 feet)

History
- Designer: Thomas Taylor
- Constructed by: Hamilton Bridge Company
- Opened: October 18, 1918

Location
- Interactive map of Prince Edward Viaduct

The Prince Edward Viaduct System, commonly referred to as the Bloor Viaduct, is the name of a truss arch bridge system in Toronto, Ontario, Canada, connecting Bloor Street East, on the west side of the system, with Danforth Avenue on the east. The system includes the Rosedale Valley phase (a smaller structure, referred to as the Rosedale Valley Bridge, carrying Bloor Street over the Rosedale Ravine) and the Sherbourne Phase, an embankment built to extend Bloor Street East to the Rosedale Ravine from Sherbourne Street. The Don Valley phase of the system, the most recognizable, spans the Don River Valley, crossing over (from west to east), Bayview Avenue, the Don River, and the Don Valley Parkway.

The roadway has five lanes (three eastbound and two westbound) with a bicycle lane in each direction. The subway level connects Broadview station in the east with Castle Frank and Sherbourne stations to the west.

== History ==
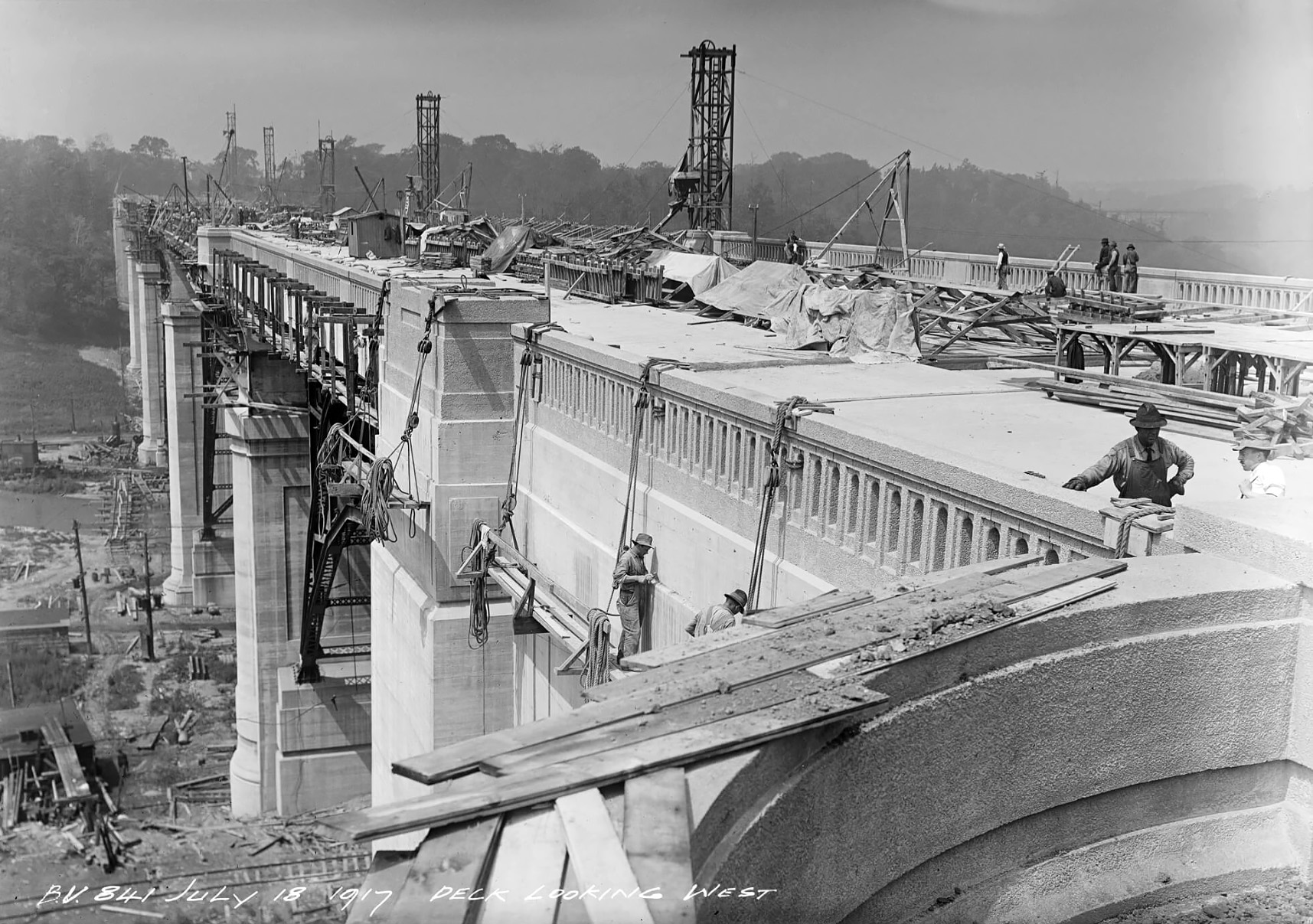
Construction of the Prince Edward Viaduct in 1917

Referendums on the construction of the Prince Edward Viaduct were held in Toronto in every year from 1910 to 1913, with residents voting against its construction in 1912 by 59 votes and in favour in 1913 by 9236 votes. The projected cost of its construction increased from CA$759,000 in 1910 to CA$2.5 million in 1913; its final cost was CA$2,480,349.05 ($45.8 million in 2025 dollars). Upon its completion in 1918, it was named for Prince Edward, Prince of Wales (later King Edward VIII).

The viaduct was designed to facilitate public transit: Its upper deck originally carried the Bloor streetcar line, while both the Don Valley and the Rosedale Valley spans included a lower deck for a potential future underground rapid transit line; controversial at the time because of its high additional cost. The bridge's designer and the commissioner of public works, R.C. Harris, were able to have their way and the lower deck eventually proved to save millions of dollars when the Toronto Transit Commission's Bloor–Danforth subway opened in 1966, which resulted in the abandonment of the Bloor streetcar (save for two short segments beyond the original ends of the subway line which closed two years later when it was extended). The Rosedale Valley span was not used for the subway, as the southward dip of Bloor between the spans at Parliament Street resulted in curves considered too sharp for the subway. For this reason, a separate subway bridge was built over the Rosedale Valley, just west of Castle Frank station.

The Prince Edward Viaduct resulted in more rapid development of those portions of Toronto lying on the east side of the Don Valley.

== Design ==
Designed by Edmund W. Burke, the Prince Edward Viaduct is a three hinged concrete-steel arch bridge with a total span of 494 metres (1,620 feet), at 40 metres (131 feet) above the Don Valley. The bridge consists of a deck made of transverse beams and I-girders, which transfer load to column supports. The column supports then transfer the load to the trusses within the arches, which transfer the load to the arches themselves. Finally, the arches transfer their load through large hinges to a concrete pier and eventually to the ground. Steel was provided by Dominion Bridge Company.

In addition to the Don River, the Don Valley Parkway, and Bayview Avenue, two railway lines, an electrical transmission line and a bicycle trail all pass under the bridge spans.

=== Luminous Veil ===
Over time, the Prince Edward Viaduct became a magnet for suicide, falling bodies posing risk to the traffic underneath. With nearly 500 suicides by 2003, the viaduct ranked as the most fatal standing structure in Canada and the second most in North America, after the Golden Gate Bridge in San Francisco. At its peak in 1997, the suicide rate averaged one person every 22 days. In 1957, a child also climbed onto the railing and fell accidentally while walking along it, but survived. People who have survived the jump have had severe consequences including paralysis, organ damage, broken bones and lifelong pain. Most think that jumping will lead to an instant death but, for many, death is not instant.

The suicides and safety risks prompted the construction of a barrier in 2003, though it was first approved by Toronto City Council in 1998, and delayed because of concerns about funding. During that time, the viaduct was the site of an estimated 48 to 60 suicides. The council originally approved a CA$2.5 million budget. However, the minimum bid for construction was CA$5.5 million. Council eventually endorsed a fundraising campaign to raise the remainder of the money. Construction was completed in 2003 at the cost of CA$5.5 million, with CA$2.5 million coming from taxpayers.

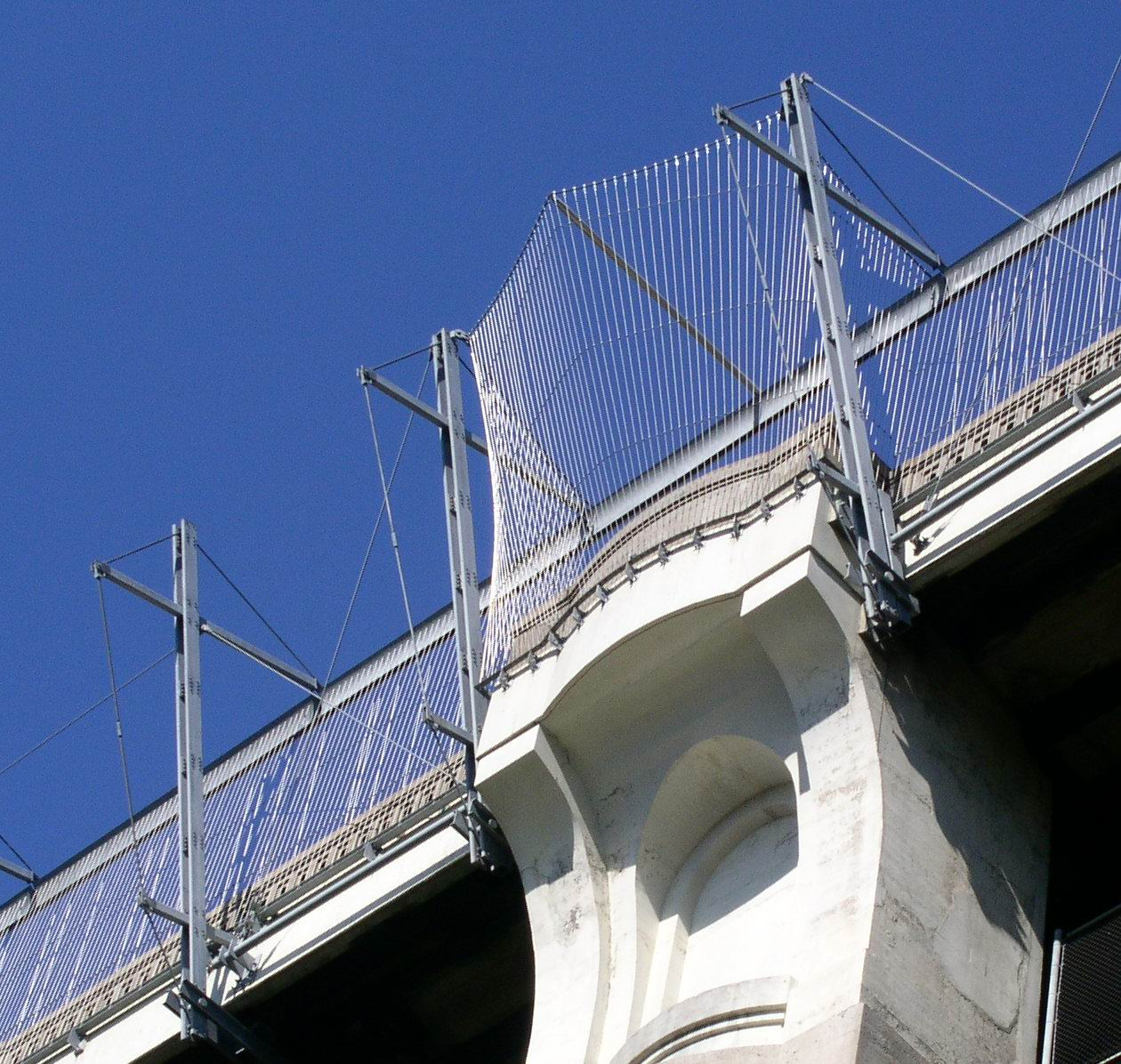
The Luminous Veil in 2005, shortly after its construction

The barrier was called the Luminous Veil. Designed by architect Dereck Revington and engineers at Halcrow Yolles, and completed in 2003, the Luminous Veil consists of over 9,000 steel rods, 12.7 cm (5.0 in) apart and five metres (16 ft) high, stretched to cantilevered girders. The tensile structure was difficult to analyze and required several tests at the University of Toronto. Initially, cost prohibited the planned lighting to be installed on the top horizontal member. The lighting installation was completed in July 2015. The Luminous Veil was the recipient of a 1999 Canadian Architect Award of Excellence.

A 2010 study found that though the barrier prevented suicide attempts from the viaduct, overall rates of suicide by jumping for the City of Toronto have not changed since its construction, as attempts have occurred from other bridges lacking similar barriers, including from the nearby Leaside Bridge. However, a 2017 study with the same lead author found that "over the long term, suicide-by-jumping declined in Toronto after the barrier with no associated increase in suicide by other means". Writer Joe Fiorito wrote about the Luminous Veil in his contribution to the 2013 Canadian anthology "The Stories That Are Great Within Us", edited by Barry Callaghan in which he noted "We jump elsewhere now."

== Popular culture ==
The bridge was shut down for three days to allow the filming of Resident Evil: Apocalypse (2004), where in the film it represented the only way out of Raccoon City.

The Luminous Veil is referenced in the Barenaked Ladies song "War on Drugs", and in the Great Lake Swimmers song "The Great Exhale".

The 1987 novel In the Skin of a Lion, by Canadian–Sri Lankan writer Michael Ondaatje, fictionalizes the lives of immigrants who played a large role in building the city of Toronto in the early 1900s, including prominently the Prince Edward Viaduct.

== See also ==
- Royal eponyms in Canada
- Suicide bridge
- List of bridges in Canada
