= Homeless encampments during Covid-19 in Toronto =

The COVID-19 pandemic made homelessness in Toronto more visible, due to the rise of encampments in public parks. However, homelessness in Canada had been an issue of widespread concern long before the pandemic's arrival. A 2016 report found that at least 235,000 Canadians experience homelessness in a year, and 35,000 Canadians experience it on a given night. A Nanos survey found in 2020 that 72% of Canadians believed it was urgent to work toward ending homelessness in Canada. A 2020 report from the Wellesley Institute argues that there were disproportionately higher rates of evictions in Black neighborhoods, and that Black residents were among the worst hit by COVID-19. As part of its stay at home order in March 2020, the Ontario government instated a ban on evictions, however this was lifted with the emergency order in June 2020. The Ontario government however made evictions easier, according to some critics, due to its passage of Bill 184 which allowed landlords to bypass the Landlord and Tenant Board. One advocacy group deemed the cascading effects of Bill 184 'a bloodbath of evictions'. By December 2020, Toronto tenants were calling for a reinstatement of the moratorium on evictions. The crisis conditions of the pandemic lead to an increase in organizing against what many homelessness advocates deemed to be social murder of the city's unhoused. This ranged from legal lawsuits against the city's shelter system to calls for a city plan that would address the large numbers of unhoused people camping outside, to suits against encampment evictions, to large scale protests against the clearings of public parks. The Covid-19 encampments are best understood as emerging out of a longer history of urban informality in Toronto.

== Shelter space and standards during COVID-19 ==
A public interest groups coalition represented by Goldblatt Partners LLP filed legal proceedings in Ontario's Superior Court of justice, in April 2020, over what was described as 'deplorable conditions in the city's shelter system and respite sites amid the COVID-19 pandemic'. The coalition included the Advocacy Centre for Tenants Ontario, the Black Legal Action Centre, the HIV & AIDS Legal Clinic Ontario, the Canadian Civil Liberties Association, Aboriginal Legal Services, and Sanctuary Ministries. The coalition which had earlier threatened to sue, argued that the City was maintaining discriminatory standards in its operation of its shelter system which violated the right to life and security of the person of shelter residents. In its letter threatening suit, the coalition blamed such standards for the outbreaks at 14 Toronto shelters, with 100 confirmed cases, noting that such a state of affairs was not a surprise. The coalition pointed to the city's failure to comply with its own physical distancing bylaw by ensuring two meters between beds, or with either federal and provincial public health guidance. The lawsuit was shelved in mid-May 2020, following an agreement that the city use its best efforts to ensure appropriate physical distancing and provide more beds amongst other conditions. The agreement was formalized on May 19, 2020 ahead of the scheduled court hearing on June 8, 2020 and required the city to provide regular detailed reports on its compliance over a succeeding two-month period.

An outbreak which lead to the death of two men and the infection of 18 others saw the closure of St. Simon's shelter, in late May 2020, over two weeks for deep cleaning and sanitization. Subsequent widespread testing found a third of the shelter was positive for the virus, and simultaneously asymptomatic. These tests results placed St. Simon's on a list of Toronto's shelters which had been hard hit by COVID-19. The city's data tracked 451 cases connected to the shelter system, with 90 cases having been found at Costi shelter, 21 at the Salvation Army's Evangeline Residence, and 39 at Seaton House.

The coalition of organizations resumed its suit in July 2020, alleging the city had failed to meet the standards outlined in the original settlement agreement. A press release noted that in spite of the city's claims of compliance, Toronto's Central Intake line was still turning away individuals entitled to a shelter bed under the settlement agreement on a daily basis, with the city's data showing that the capacity of the shelter system had declined since the start of the pandemic. The city argued in response that it had met the physical distancing requirements and looked forward to responding to the allegations. The city also took offence in its response, claiming that the coalition's assertions were preposterous, misleading and insulting to Shelter, Support and Housing Administration (SSHA) staff. In mid-October 2020, the public interest groups coalition won their lawsuit against the city. Ontario Superior Court Justice Lorne Sossin found that the city had not used its best effort to achieve the goals set out in the original agreement which heightened the already significant vulnerability of Covid-19 spread to the homeless. Brad Ross, the city's chief communications officer, blamed errors in staff communications for the lack of bed distancing, asserting that just 0.45 per cent of the shelter system was not in compliance, and this had been rectified by September 9, 2020.

With increased acknowledgement that COVID-19 transmission is airborne, advocates began to call for substantial changes to Toronto's shelter provision, citing the lack of widespread access to private spaces as rationale for why some unhoused people would choose to sleep outside rather than risk contracting the virus. They demanded, in December 2020, the city open at least 2,000 new hotel rooms and stop operating shelters with shared sleeping areas and washrooms to mitigate the risk of contraction in the congregate dorms. By late January, 2021, there were reports of outbreaks at ten shelters, with 66 unhoused people infected by the virus. Mary-Anne Bedard of the city's SSHA division maintained that the city had been implementing comprehensive IPAC measures and conducting visits through its quality assurance team to ensure compliance. Further, the city claimed to be focusing on permanent solutions to homelessness.

Unhoused people also reportedly had difficulties accessing shelter space. Analysis of data by FactCheck Toronto and the Sustainability Clinic at Osgoode Hall Law School showed that between Oct. 30 and Feb. 28, at least 13,780 callers were unable to access a shelter bed. Manager of the Toronto Drop-In Network, Susan Bender, claimed that on average, 38 people a day were unable to access shelter space. The city took more than 300 beds offline due to shelter outbreaks according to comments reportedly made by Mary-Anne Bedard at the April 12 Toronto Board of Health meeting. Finding shelter space like running an ‘obstacle course’ - Healthy Debate As of April 27, there were outbreaks at 20 shelters.

According to data provided by the city, there were a total of 26 shelter resident deaths in 2018, 48 in 2019, 74 in 2020, 132 in 2021, and 110 in 2022.

== Calls for city plan ==
By March 2020, advocates were warning the city about the impact of the pandemic on the homeless, and the structural vulnerabilities they faced as a designated at-risk population. While there had been no known cases of COVID-19 in Canadian shelters or encampments, or of community transmission, advocates like Cathy Crowe maintained that given the severe crowded living conditions, and the simultaneous health conditions of many of the homeless, there was an urgent need to be wary. This was framed as part of an ongoing campaign to declare homelessness a public emergency in Toronto. Advocates called instead for the city to assign a public health nurse to each shelter, establish what a quarantine protocol would look like, increase funding for supplies and increase space between beds as part of a preventative plan to forestall infections and death from the virus. The city released a draft report created by its SSHA and United Way in September 2020 which outlined its plan to combat homelessness, as the pandemic worsened the effects of its housing crisis. The report enumerated a number of possible actions the city could take to remedy the state of its shelter system: leasing and purchasing old buildings and office spaces to be converted into permanent housing; the transformation of existing emergency shelter spaces into permanent housing units; the rapid construction of modular housing; and the creation of a more robust network of harm reduction and addiction resources. The call to declare homelessness a public emergency grew in October, this time with NDP MPP Chris Glover joining Toronto residents and community leaders at a news conference in Alexandra Park on October 3, 2020. Glover argued that a declaration would allow for more funds to be used to address the housing crisis, arguing that there was still no winter plan that would prevent people from freezing to death.

The city announced on October 4, 2020 the details of its winter plan for residents which featured 560 new spaces for the unhoused that would be available between November and April. The SSHA General Manager, Mary-Anne Bedard, argued that the 2020-21 winter services plan had been written with a COVID-19 lens in mind to minimize virus spread, a feature that had not been a consideration in previous years' iterations. Further, in the event of an extreme cold weather alert, the city's plan made provision for 150 spaces at four warming centers, an increase from previous years in which the city had not provided more than one warming center. The announced winter plan was criticized by Toronto's advocacy groups and homelessness activists as insufficient to meet the needs created by the crisis. In particular, the use of impermeable barriers between cots or mats to minimize virus spread, was criticized as ineffective against the virus's airborne fn, as well as the proposed distancing guidelines. Advocates noted as well that frontline workers were approximating that 1,000 people would be left outside, more than the city's plan accommodated for, a concern given the city's lack of support to those living in encampments. For the 2020 National Housing Day, dozens of activists constructed 14 green foam domes as a protest outside Mayor John Tory's condo. Activists wanted the city to go further than its current plans to prevent the death of Toronto's homeless during winter. John Tory was labelled as Mayor Scrooge at the protest, with one activist, street pastor Doug Johnson Hatlem reading from Charles Dickens' A Christmas Carol. The city responded with a news release detailing the 'extraordinary steps' taken to 'protect people experiencing homelessness during Covid-19. This spurred the creation of FactcheckToronto.ca, an initiative embarked on by activists seeking to challenge the city's 'aggressive misinformation campaign', arguing that the city's purported increase of spaces for the unhoused was actually 1,158 spaces fewer than the year prior. The reaction to the city's news release reportedly made homeless activists livid, and to seek their own outlet to serve both as a public challenge and public resource. Factcheck Toronto's model relies on the presentation of what it calls 'claims', and subsequent 'facts' that draw on rhetorical and statistical analysis of data and public documents garnered through Freedom of Information requests its organizing collective has been successful in applying for.

== Toronto tiny shelters ==
Toronto Tiny Shelters Collective formed in October 2020 to build small, durable, insulated shelters for those living in Toronto's encampments during the COVID-19 pandemic. Khaleel Seivwright, a 28-year-old carpenter from Scarborough, who served as the collective's public face built some of the structures in a rented Cabbagetown workshop. A single structure uses wooden beams, a thick layer of fibreglass to insulate its walls against up to -20 degrees Celsius weather, has a door, a small casement window and spinning caster wheels at each corner of the base. It is also outfitted with a carbon monoxide and smoke detector, costs $1,000 in new materials, and takes eight hours to construct.

The 'tiny shelters' are built by the group as safe, temporary alternatives for Toronto's unhoused population who can otherwise die in the cold during the winter. Seivwright first built a shelter for himself in British Columbia a few years prior and slept in it through temperatures as cold as -15 degrees Celsius before embarking on this project. The collective's project is largely being funded through an online campaign. Living in one of the shelters was described as warm and dry, offering quiet and privacy, and feeling like a home by one resident. Seivwright claims that his shelters have made his recipients happy. Other Toronto houseless advocates, like Cathy Crowe have noted that the shelters are meant to be a stopgap solution but remain necessary as innovative solutions to the lack of shelter space during the COVID-19 pandemic.

In November 2020, Janie Romoff, general manager of the city's parks, forestry and recreation division, issued a formal written warning to Khaleel Seivwright and the collective demanding the cessation of the "production, distribution, supply and installation of such shelters for the purposes of placement and use on city property". In response, the collective which had raised $200,000 in donations via their GoFundMe page promised instead to build on private property as a workaround, with some churches offering to house the structures. The city claimed in an email to journalists that the shelters create significant health and safety risks and linked the wooden shelters to reports that the Toronto Fire Services had responded to reports of at least 189 encampment fires in 2021. It noted as well that its parks bylaw prohibits any tents or structures in city parks. Fact Check Toronto, a Toronto houseless advocacy collective, disputes the claims raised by the government that encampments and the shelters pose a raised safety risk though government documents obtained by Freedom of Information Access requests. They argue that the city misrepresents and overstates the number of fires by citing data for the number of calls Toronto Fire responded to as opposed to the number of uncontrolled fires found upon arrival. Further, the rate of increased fire calls reported by the city in 2020 which were used to demonstrate an increase in safety risk do not also account for the significant increase in the number and size of encampments, and general park usage during the pandemic.

Following the warning letter there were reports on social media captured by BlogTO of the city removing some of the shelters in December 2019. The obtained video recording shows a shelter being transported into the Parks and Recreation base. The city claimed in response to allegations that it had dispossessed the shelter's occupant that it had been found unoccupied in North York's Charles Sauriol Park. Some houseless activists were described as outraged in response. By late January 2021, the Toronto Tiny Shelters Collective had uploaded a short YouTube video documentary which contains testimonials from residents asking for no more shelters to be removed, "someone lives here. Do not remove". The Toronto Tiny Shelters also inspired similar projects. Eric Lee and his son Henry Lee Heinonen decided to build insulation tube-like shelters called foam domes after witnessing the living conditions of encampment residents.

The city filed an injunction seeking to stop the building of more shelters by Khaleel Seivwright and the Toronto Tiny Shelters Collective on February 12, 2021, on city-owned land. The city cited a downtown encampment fire that result in one death, though it remains unclear who built the structure involved in the fire, arguing that the tiny shelters discourage people from coming into the government-run homeless shelters. Seivwright argued instead that the money being spent on the injunction could be used to create safe housing for those who needed it, and that the injunction served instead as a distraction that shifted attention away from the unhoused who are falling through the cracks. Seivwright was represented by a legal team of three including Danny Kastner, and Samara Secter of Addario Law LLP in his defense against the injunction. On February 28, 2021, an estimated 800 people protested for seven hours the city's decision to apply for an injunction against Seivwright and the Toronto Tiny Shelters Collective. The protest involved many of Toronto's houseless advocates and organizations like the Encampment Support Network, and Greg Cook of the Sanctuary Ministries of Toronto, and the Housing Justice Network. The protesters argued that John Tory, the Mayor of Toronto, was choosing to pick on the carpenter rather than craft effective policy which would address the unhoused crisis. Other prominent Toronto activists like Desmond Cole also spoke out against the injunction. An online petition was launched asking the city to reverse their injunction that garnered more than 80,000 signatures.

On August 28, 2021, Seivwright announced via Instagram that he had reached a settlement with the city of Toronto which required him to agree not to build or place any more structures in parks. Seivwright criticized the settlement noting that, "the future of our city does not depend on ruthlessly enforcing policies that have no regard for the humans being who live here". For its part, the city put out a press statement that lauded the settlement as a step towards ensuring safety for the unhoused.

== Encampment clearings ==
After the city announced its plans to clear encampments, the Ontario Coalition Against Poverty wrote an open letter to Mayor John Tory asking the city call of its plans to dismantle encampments in the Rosedale valley on January 7, 2020. They called instead for the city to focus its resources on adding sufficient shelter spaces, and building rent-geared-to-income housing. The city went ahead with its plans with advocates protesting the decision. They argued that there was inadequate shelter space, pointing to the city's own data which reportedly showed that as of January 6, 2020, shelters were at 94% capacity. In early March 2020, the city imposed a moratorium on the clearing of encampments. This was reinstituted after the city began to implement new temporary measures for the unhoused. In late April 2020, Tory announced that the city would provide temporary housing to encampment residents.

In mid-May 2020 the city moved to clear the homeless encampments under the Gardiner expressway, and at Lakeshore with some concerned passersby attempting to intervene. Standoffs with residents were also reported to have occurred. Several residents were reported to have said that they preferred to camp outside instead of a shelter due to fear about contracting COVID-19. One resident expressed that the camps were a decent environment with social networks for aid that they did not want taken away. City officials began talks in late June, 2020 to clear encampments in George Hislop park and Norman Jewison Park. Tory, in an interview with the CBC disclosed he found the presence of 40 tents across the two tents to be unsatisfactory and had met with residents' representatives and neighboring businesses. The city was reportedly in talks with Sanctuary Ministries, who served as advocates on behalf of the encampment residents.

By mid-July 2020, encampment residents in Moss Park were bracing for a city initiated clearing after receiving Notices of Advice under Toronto Municipal Code Chapter 608. The city did not follow through with that scheduled clearing after residents refused to comply with the notices. Two partnered residents expressed a wish for permanent housing, rather than a room at a shelter hotel where COVID-19 was rampant.

14 encampment residents together with the Toronto Overdose Prevention Society, the Ontario Coalition Against Poverty and Neighborhood Legal Services took the city to court on October 10, 2020 to challenge the city's bylaw preventing encampments. Advocates noted that the city had created a catch-22 situation in which it was refusing to let people set up encampments in public parks but was also not providing adequate and safe shelter space. The court application was originally filed on July 21, 2020.The petitioners sought an interim court order that would allow the homeless stay in Toronto parks until a constitutional challenge of a city bylaw 'that bans living or camping in parks after midnight' could be heard. The city's lawyer argued that the petitioners were creating a false narrative of having to choose between supposedly safe encampments and supposedly dangerous shelters, and further that the risk of contracting COVID-19 in shelters was not as high as the petitioners claimed. The request was eventually denied in late October by Justice Paul Schabas who ruled that "The sweeping relief sought would unjustifiably tie the city's hands in dealing with encampments that raise serious health and safety concerns for an indefinite duration, and would unduly prevent the use of parks by others". Schabas however, did not want his ruling to be taken as a direction by the city to dismantle the encampments in public parks.

In December 2020, series of published letters were published by academics, researchers, lawyers and prominent musicians urging the city to stop encampment evictions and to work instead to find permanent housing solutions. One such letter had 480 signatories of academics and researchers, another had at least 100 lawyers and law students, and a third had hundreds of musicians. At a meeting of the city's economic and community development committee, nearly 40 homeless advocates demanded the city impose a moratorium on encampment evictions. They requested instead for an investment of $1 million in community agencies to provide survival supplies and fire safety equipment to people living in tents and to open 2,000 new rooms in shelter hotels. Tory expressed a lack of certainty in the merit of these demands, and argued that the deputations were based on false premises.

In early January 2021, the city began a shift away from its strategy of attempting to negotiate with the encampments and their supporters. Documents obtained by freedom of information requests filed by activists reveal instead that bureaucrats began formulating plans to clear the big four encampments identified in its Pathways Inside program (Moss Park, Alexandra Park, Trinity Bellwoods and Lamport Stadium). While bureaucrats intended to keep engaging with residents and their supporters, they also began to work towards clearings in April. On March 16, 2021, the city of Toronto announced, via news release, what it described as a new city program that would support people living in encampments with safe and supportive indoor space. The Pathways Inside program was announced in response to the encampments which had sprung up around the city's downtown core during the COVID-19 pandemic. These encampments are described by the city as unsafe and illegal. The program identifies "four priority sites, namely Moss Park, Alexandra Park, Trinity Bellwoods and Lamport Stadium, that are subject to increased health and safety concerns". Prior to the announcement, the city leased the downtown Novotel Toronto Centre Hotel as a shelter to be operated by the housing agency: Homes First Society, to allow for more physical distancing. Housing activists, such as the Encampment Support Network criticized the program as "a rebrand of the city’s ongoing efforts to clear the four biggest encampments in Toronto” and invisibilize homelessness while failing to address the long-term permanent housing needs of encampment residents.

By May 2021 the city had again announced its intentions of a clearing via notices posted on eleven tents in George Hislop Park. Greg Cook, an outreach worker at the neighboring Sanctuary Ministries of Toronto, told journalists that the city via its Streets to Homes program had worked with Sanctuary staff to move 31 people into temporary apartments in North York, however, there were still people on waiting lists. The city moved ahead and cleared out three encampments, at George Hislop Park, Barbara Hall Park, and on a median of University Avenue. City spokesperson, Brad Ross claimed there was enough inside space for all who were approached, and that of those affected all but two people at George Hislop Park accepted offers to move inside. Lorraine Lam, an advocate and Sanctuary outreach worker, present during the clearing at George Hislop Park noted security officers were present. When asked, Brad Ross said the security officers were present to ensure the safety of everyone involved.

The city proceeded with its plans and brought multiple bulldozers and dozens of police officers to evict residents from the encampment at Lamport Stadium on May 19, 2021. Activists from the Encampment Support Network and Toronto residents protested the eviction. On June 22, 2021, the city also moved to clear the encampments at Trinity Bellwoods park. Activists and locals gathered to form a human chain to prevent the action. The clearing reportedly involved police helicopters and a mobilization of multiple logistical and financial resources which many observers criticized on social media as a waste of tax dollars. The clearing was also reportedly rife with high tensions, that however did not culminate in a riot. The city's clearing which involved large numbers of police officers was also criticized as sometimes violent, and also to have attempted to prevent media coverage by the Canadian Association of Journalists. A month later, on July 22, 2021, the city moved to clear encampments at Alexandra Park, this time closing the park early in the morning to the public. They also reportedly denied a journalist from gaining access to the park which was fenced off. At least nine people were arrested as part of the clearing with seven arrested for trespassing.

On September 28, 2021, the office of Toronto’s Ombudsman announced Tuesday that it has launched an investigation into the city’s clearing of encampments in some of its parks. Kwame Addo, the ombudsman, said his office had received complaints about how the encampment clearings were handled. The city earlier that month had revealed it spent almost $2 million removing homeless encampments from three parks. The city said it would cooperate with the investigation. The Toronto Ombudsman office released its report in July 2022 which found the protocol meant to guide city staff in interacting with encampments had not been updated since 2006. For its investigation, the ombudsman’s office says it conducted 50 interviews with city staff and community stakeholders, reviewed approximately 11,000 documents and spoke to 43 people who lived in encampments. The city in a news release said it had accepted all eight recommendations of the report.
