= Sherbourne station =

Toronto subway station

Sherbourne
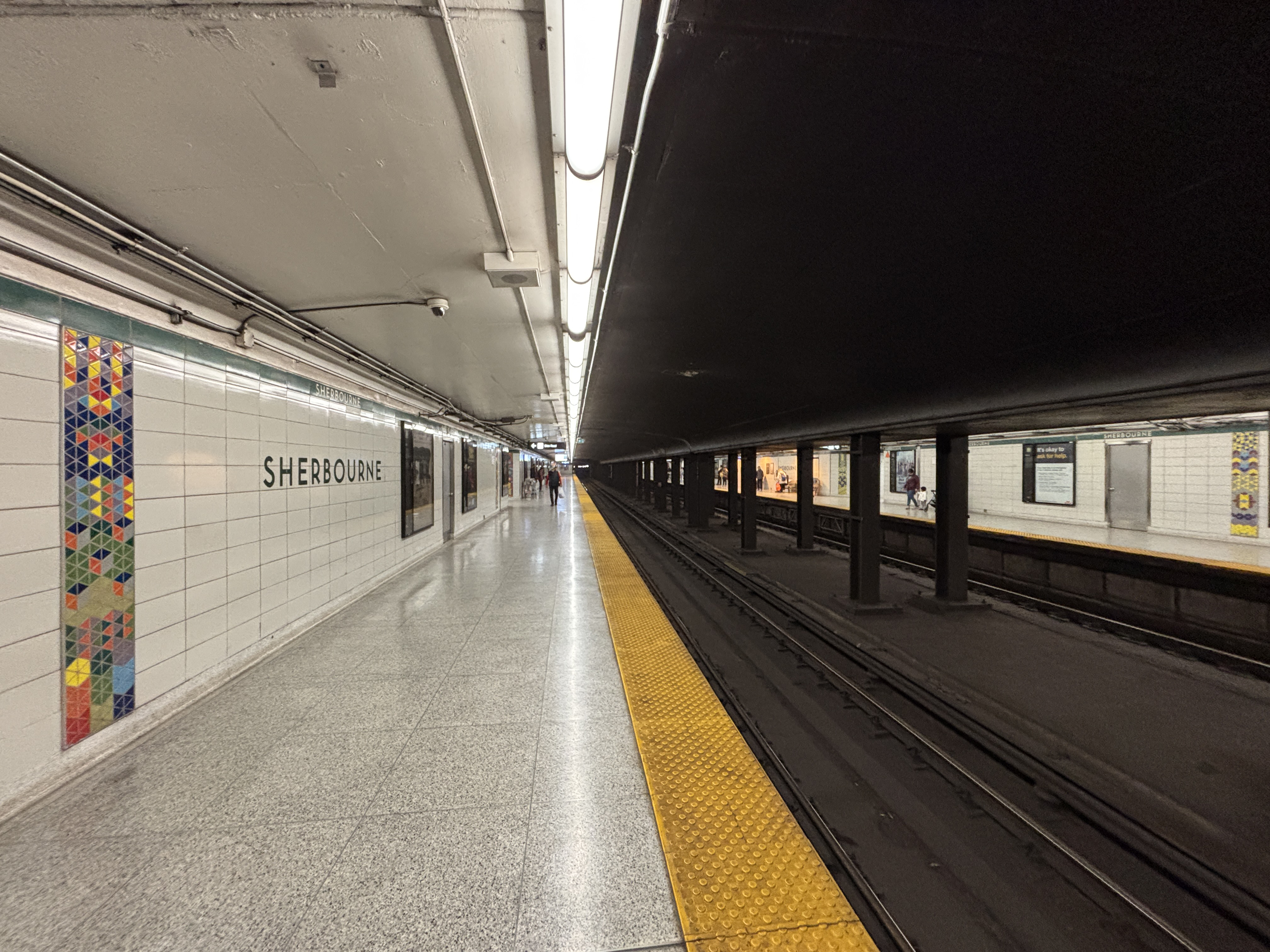

General information
- Location: 633 Sherbourne Street, Toronto, Ontario; Canada
- Coordinates: 43°40′20″N 79°22′35″W
- Platforms: Side platforms
- Tracks: 2
- Connections: TTC buses: 75 Sherbourne; 300 Bloor - Danforth

Construction
- Structure type: Underground
- Accessible: Yes

Other information
- Website: Official station page

History
- Opened: February 26, 1966; 60 years ago

Passengers
- 2023–2024: 24,689
- Rank: 23 of 70

Services
Preceding station	Toronto Transit Commission	Following station
Yonge towards Kipling	Line 2 Bloor–Danforth	Castle Frank towards Kennedy
Location

Sherbourne is a subway station on the Bloor–Danforth line in Toronto, Ontario, Canada. The station, which opened in 1966, is located west of Sherbourne Street on the south side of Bloor Street East. The station primarily serves the St. James Town neighbourhood and the southern portion of Rosedale. In December 2021, this station became an accessible subway station after undergoing renovations that began in August 2019.

== Entrances ==
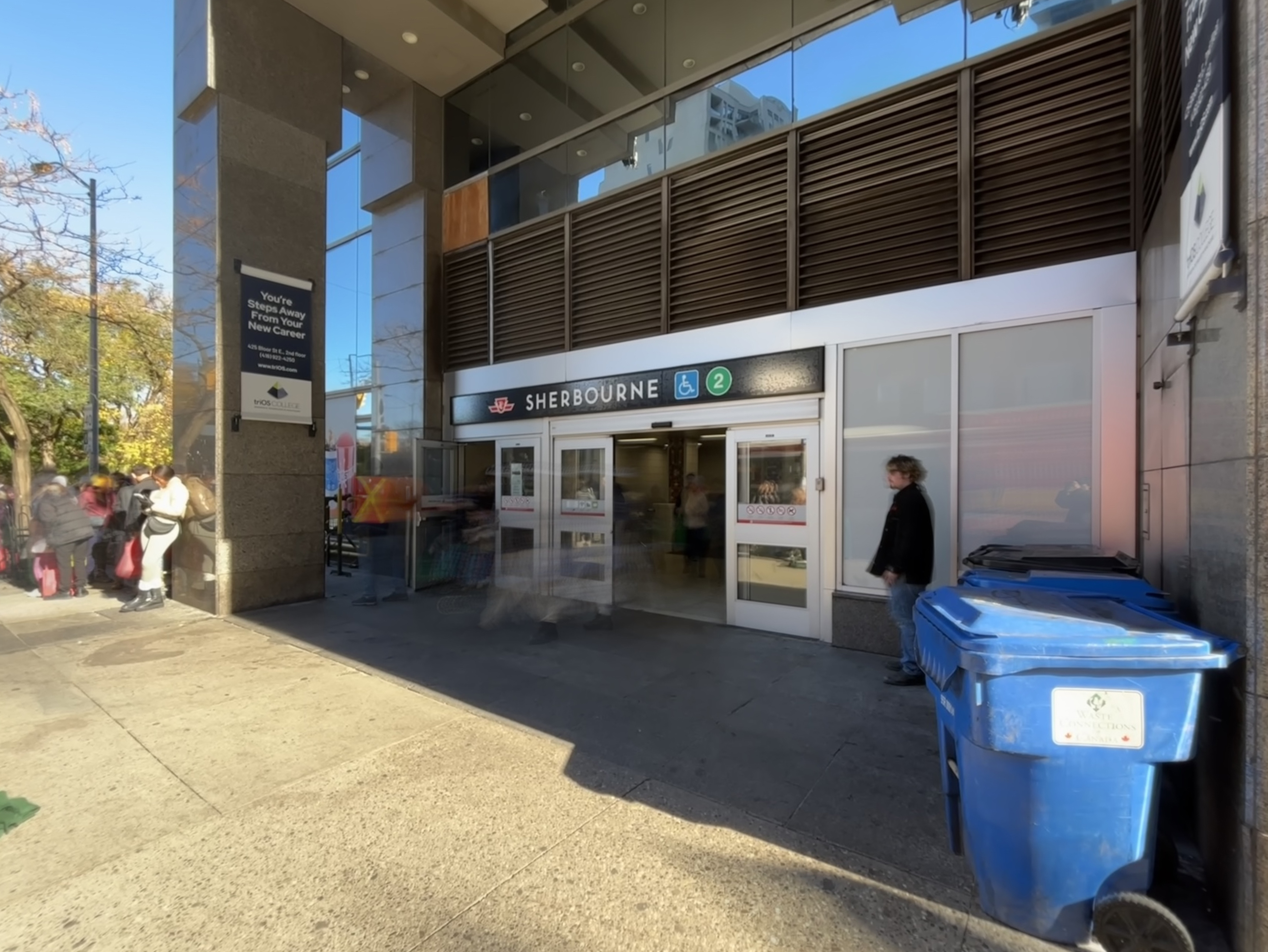
Main entrance

The primary entrance is located on the Sherbourne Street side of the office building at 425 Bloor Street East. An unstaffed second entrance to the east end of the platforms is on Glen Road, a small side street which runs north off Howard Street from the densely populated St. James Town. A pedestrian tunnel under Bloor Street and a footbridge across Rosedale Valley Road provide access to this entrance from Rosedale to the north.

== Former photo ID centre ==
Sherbourne station previously housed the TTC Photo ID Centre. The TTC photographic team now visits most participating colleges and universities at the beginning of each academic year, and the post-secondary student monthly pass is now available only available via the Presto card. In August 2020, the Photo ID Centre at Sherbourne station was permanently closed and relocated to Bathurst station.

== Artwork ==
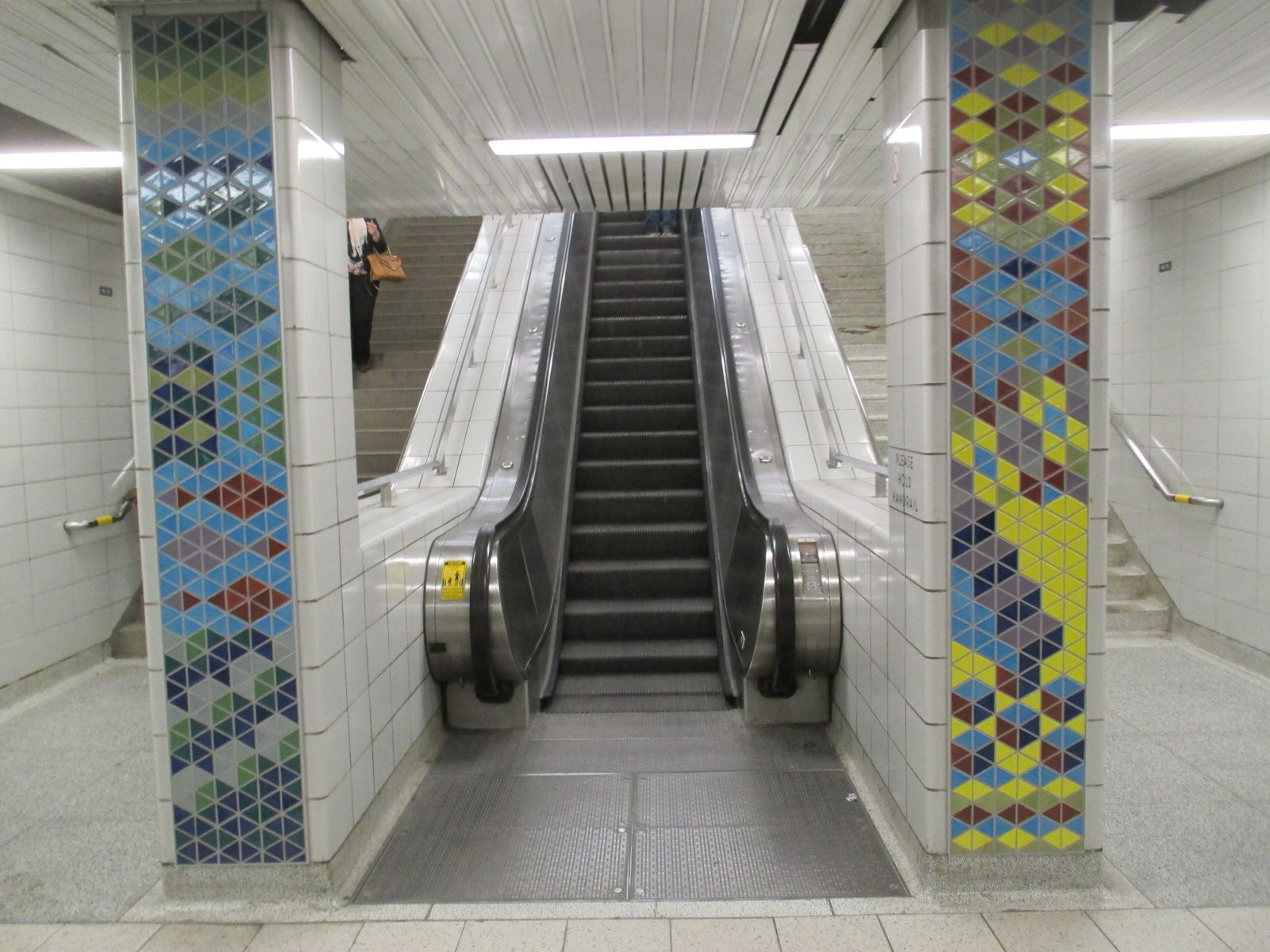
Artwork The Whole is Greater than the Sum of its Parts by Rebecca Bayer

In 2019, the artwork titled The Whole is Greater than the Sum of its Parts by Rebecca Bayer was installed as panels at various locations in the station at the platform and concourse levels. Using custom ceramic tiles, the panels consist of colourful mosaics arranged in geometric, triangular patterns. According to the TTC's Public Art page: "Sherbourne station is an important transit hub for the multicultural neighbourhoods it serves and this artwork intends to reaffirm the station as a shared place where the wider community interacts daily."

== Subway infrastructure in the vicinity ==
This is the only station that was located south of Bloor Street on the original 1966 line. Sherbourne is also uniquely deep underground, which required a 690-metre-long (2,250 ft) section of the tunnel to be bored, rather than constructed using the shallow cut-and-cover method used for most of the line, west to Bloor–Yonge station.

East of the station, the line crosses back under Bloor Street to the north side. It emerges from the tunnel to cross the Rosedale Ravine on a curving covered concrete bridge, and then returns underground just before Castle Frank station. The adjacent bridge that carries Bloor Street across the ravine, although built with provision for a lower deck as part of the Prince Edward Viaduct project, is at such an angle to the subway alignment that it could not be conveniently used. A conventional bridge was planned for the subway line, with a view of the ravine, but local objections forced the Toronto Transit Commission to enclose it in a concrete shell for noise abatement.

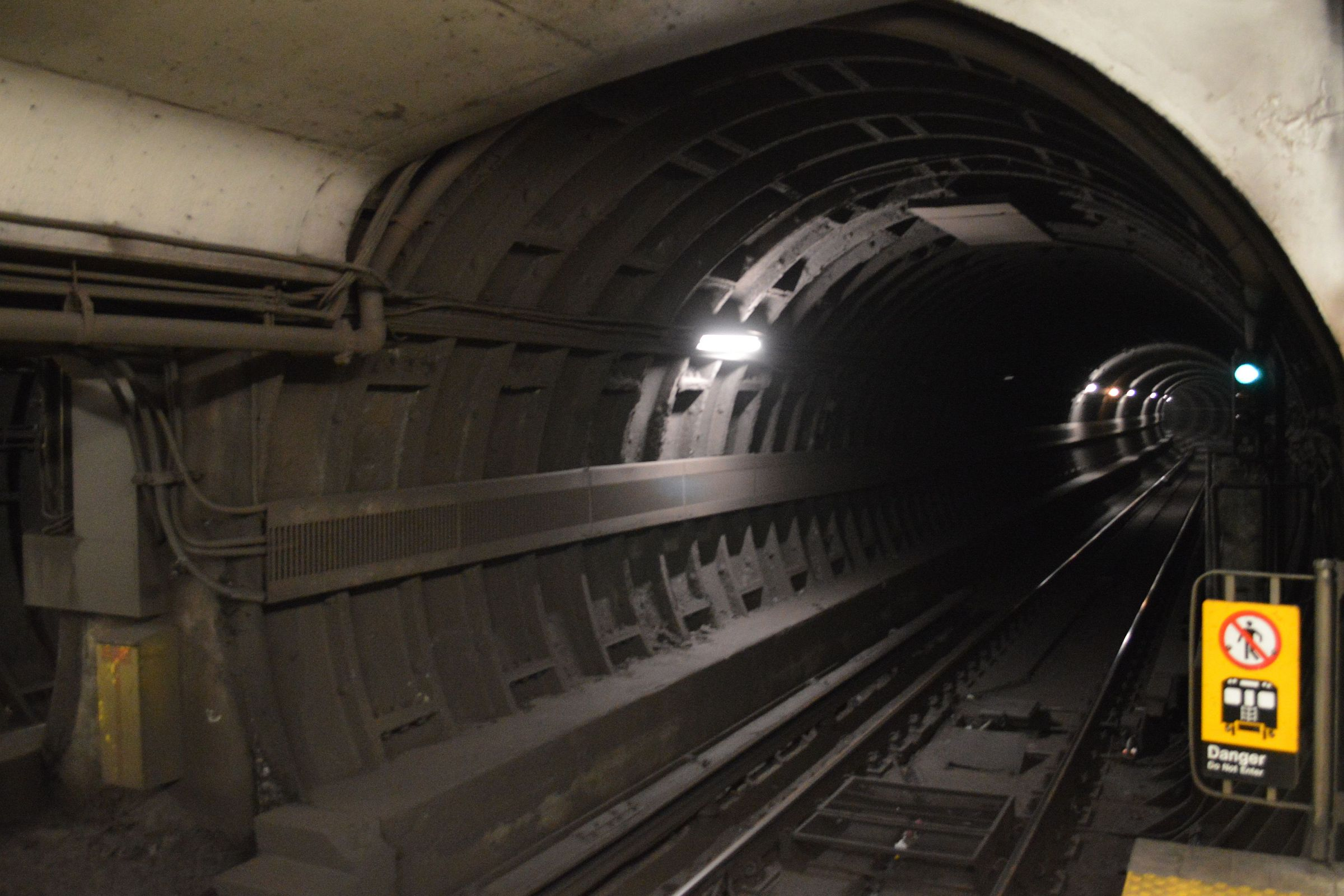
Bored tunnel towards Yonge station

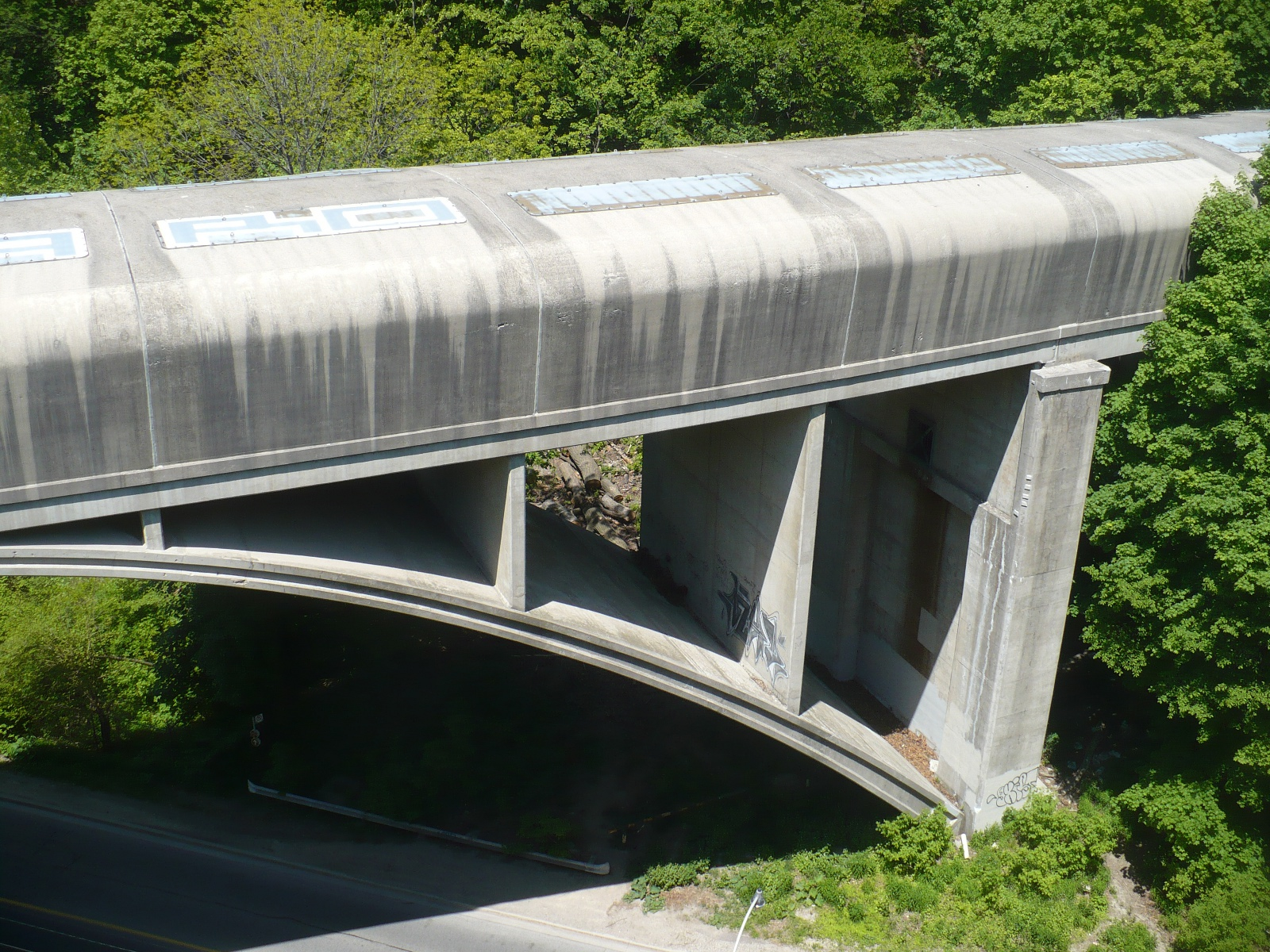
Covered bridge over Rosedale Valley Road

== Surface connections ==
Transfers to buses occur at curbside stops outside this station. TTC routes serving the station include:

Route	Name	Additional information
75	Sherbourne	Southbound to Queens Quay via South Drive
300A	Bloor–Danforth	Eastbound to Warden, westbound to Pearson Airport
300B	Bloor–Danforth	Eastbound to Kennedy station; westbound to West Mall
