= Rosedale Valley Bridge =

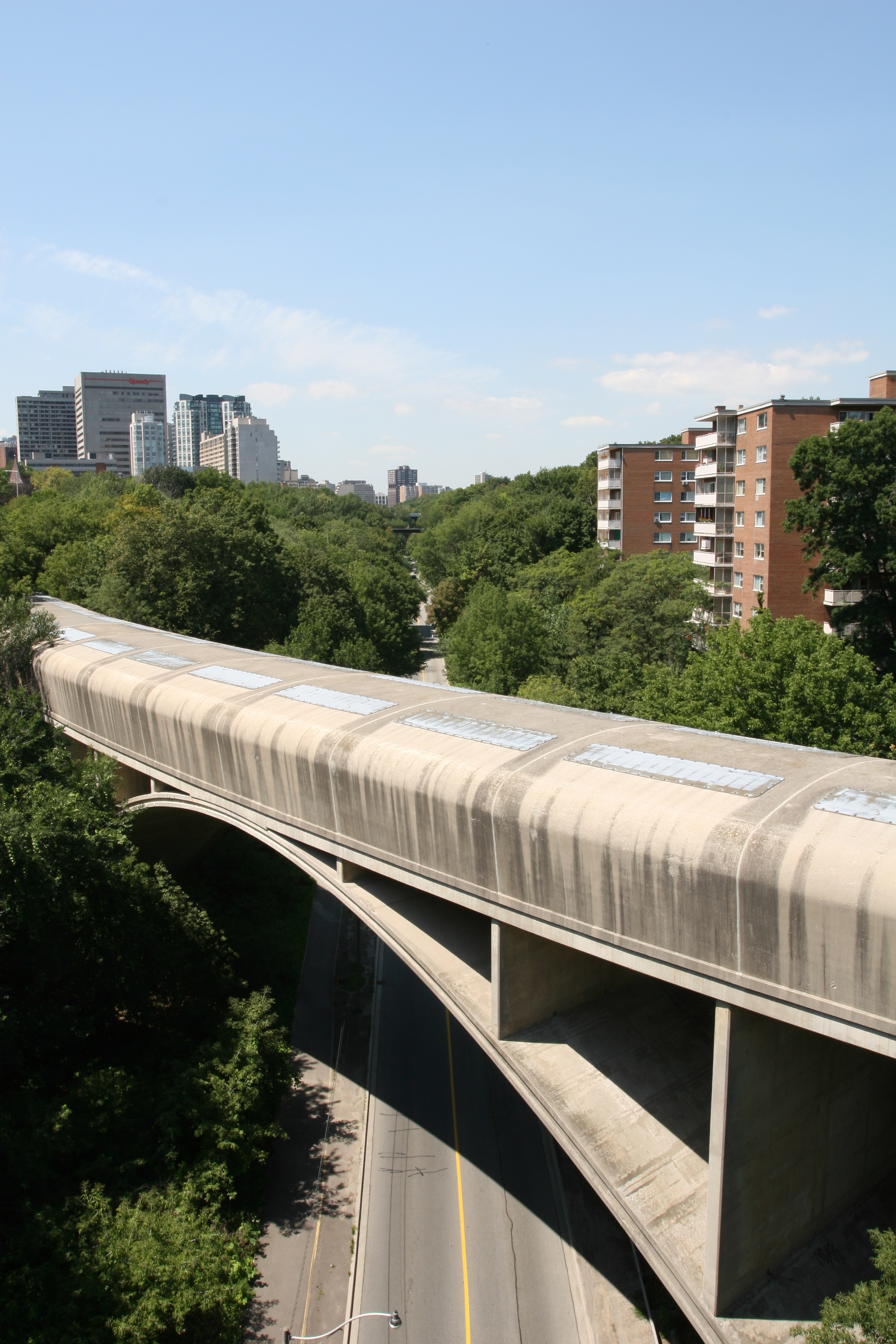
- Coordinates: 43.67263°N 79.37071°W
- Carries: Line 2 Bloor–Danforth
- Crosses: Rosedale Ravine; Rosedale Valley Road
- Locale: Toronto, Ontario, Canada
- Other name: Rosedale Ravine Bridge
- Maintained by: Toronto Transit Commission

Characteristics
- Design: Covered arch bridge
- Material: Steel and concrete
- No. of spans: 1

History
- Constructed by: John B. Parkin
- Construction start: 1965
- Construction end: 1966
- Opened: February 2, 1966

Location
- Interactive map of Rosedale Valley Bridge

The Rosedale Valley Bridge (also called the Rosedale Ravine Bridge) is a covered arch bridge located in the northeast part of Downtown Toronto, Ontario. Built in 1966 by architect John B. Parkin (now part of Delcan Corporation), the concrete bridge carries Line 2 trains of the subway across the Rosedale Ravine.

The eastern end of the Rosedale Valley Bridge is situated at the western end of Castle Frank station. The bridge itself is positioned on the north side of and almost parallel to the Rosedale section of the Prince Edward Viaduct. The viaduct opened in 1918 and had a lower deck over its entire length designed for rail transport. When the first phase of the Bloor subway line opened, its tracks utilized the lower deck of the main phase across the Don River Valley to the east as originally intended. However, since the approach curves leading to the Rosedale section would be too sharp for the trains, the dedicated Rosedale Valley Bridge was built to carry them, and the lower deck of the original viaduct's Rosedale Valley span remains unused.

Although the bridge once had open skylights for ventilation, they were later covered to reduce noise to the surrounding area. It can be seen from the north side of Bloor Street, which crosses from the adjacent Prince Edward Viaduct, or from below on Rosedale Valley Road which it passes over.

== Other bridges ==
Besides the Rosedale Valley Bridge and Prince Edward Viaduct, there are three other bridges that span above Rosedale Valley Road:

- Glen Road Bridge: a pedestrian only deck truss bridge built after the 1950s to replace a late 19th Century road bridge
- Sherborne Street Bridge: The original deck truss bridge was built before 1909, demolished in 1952 and replaced by the current steel beam bridge
- Mount Pleasant Road Bridge: deck truss bridge built in 1943
