= Castle Frank station =

Toronto subway station

Castle Frank
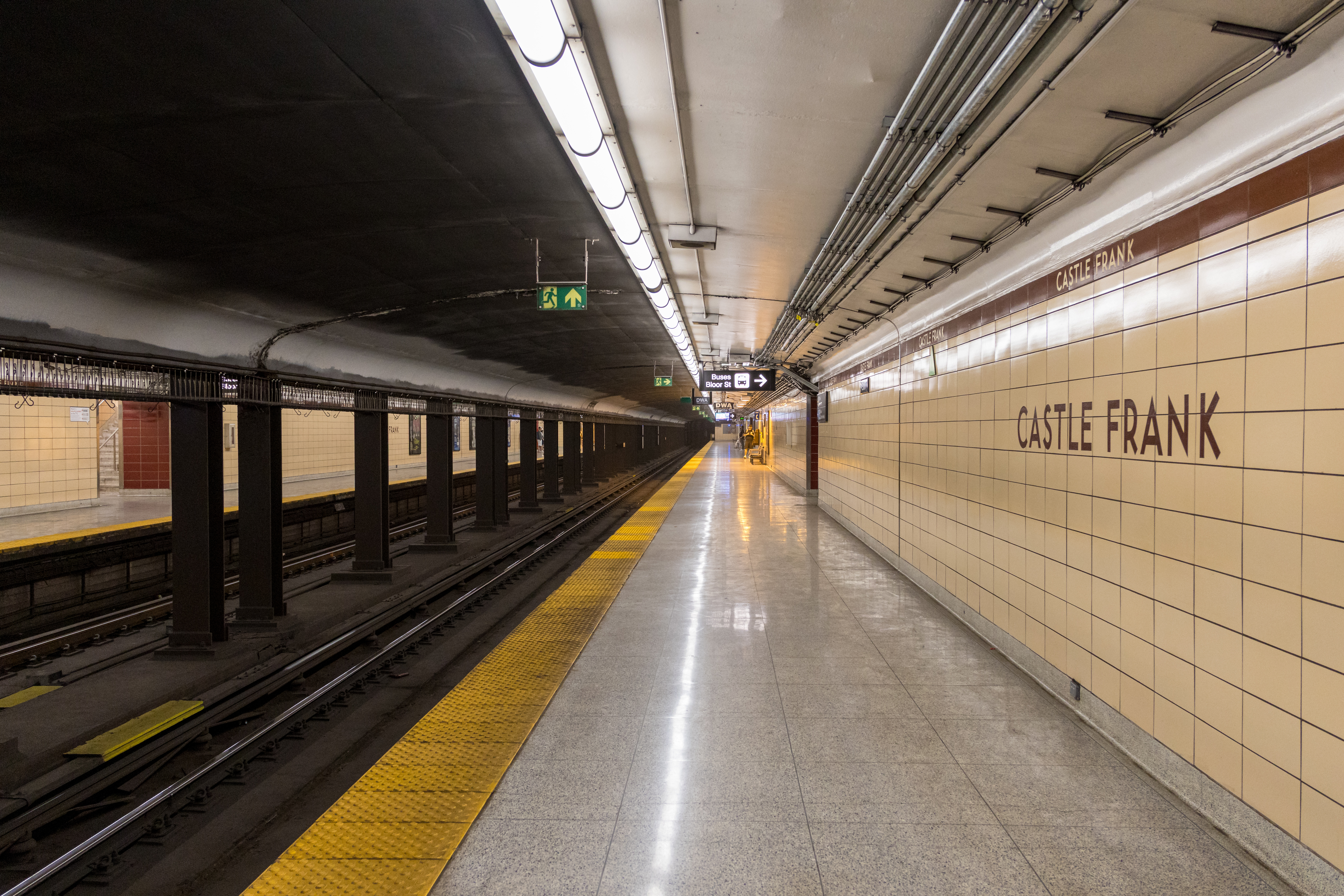

General information
- Location: 600 Bloor Street East; Toronto, Ontario; Canada
- Coordinates: 43°40′25″N 79°22′09″W
- Platforms: Side platforms
- Tracks: 2
- Connections: TTC buses: 65 Parliament; 94 Wellesley; 300 Bloor–Danforth; 365 Parliament

Construction
- Structure type: Underground
- Accessible: Yes

Other information
- Website: Official station page

History
- Opened: February 26, 1966; 60 years ago

Passengers
- 2023–2024: 8,943
- Rank: 59 of 70

Services
Preceding station	Toronto Transit Commission	Following station
Sherbourne towards Kipling	Line 2 Bloor–Danforth	Broadview towards Kennedy
Location

Castle Frank is a subway station on Line 2 Bloor–Danforth of the Toronto subway. It is located at the northwest corner of Bloor Street East and Castle Frank Road.

Without any major commercial, industrial or entertainment destinations, the station primarily serves the residents of South Rosedale, from which it is within walking distance, and St. James Town and Cabbagetown by way of the 65 Parliament and 94 Wellesley bus routes. Nearby landmarks include Rosedale Heights School of the Arts and St. James Cemetery.

== Entrances ==
The entrance to the station is located on the northwest corner of Castle Frank Road and Bloor Street East. The station was rated as high priority in the requirement for a second exit which, although scheduled to be finished by January 2010, finally opened in December 2012 after many delays. This project still did not make the station accessible, although the stairs give subway riders a direct connection to the bus bays. Only an exit is provided through turnstile gates, without any way to get into the station using a pass or token that is available at the secondary entrance to many other stations.

Late in the fourth quarter of 2021, construction started to install two elevators to make Castle Frank station accessible, connecting the street-level concourse to each of the east- and westbound platforms. The project was completed in October 2024.

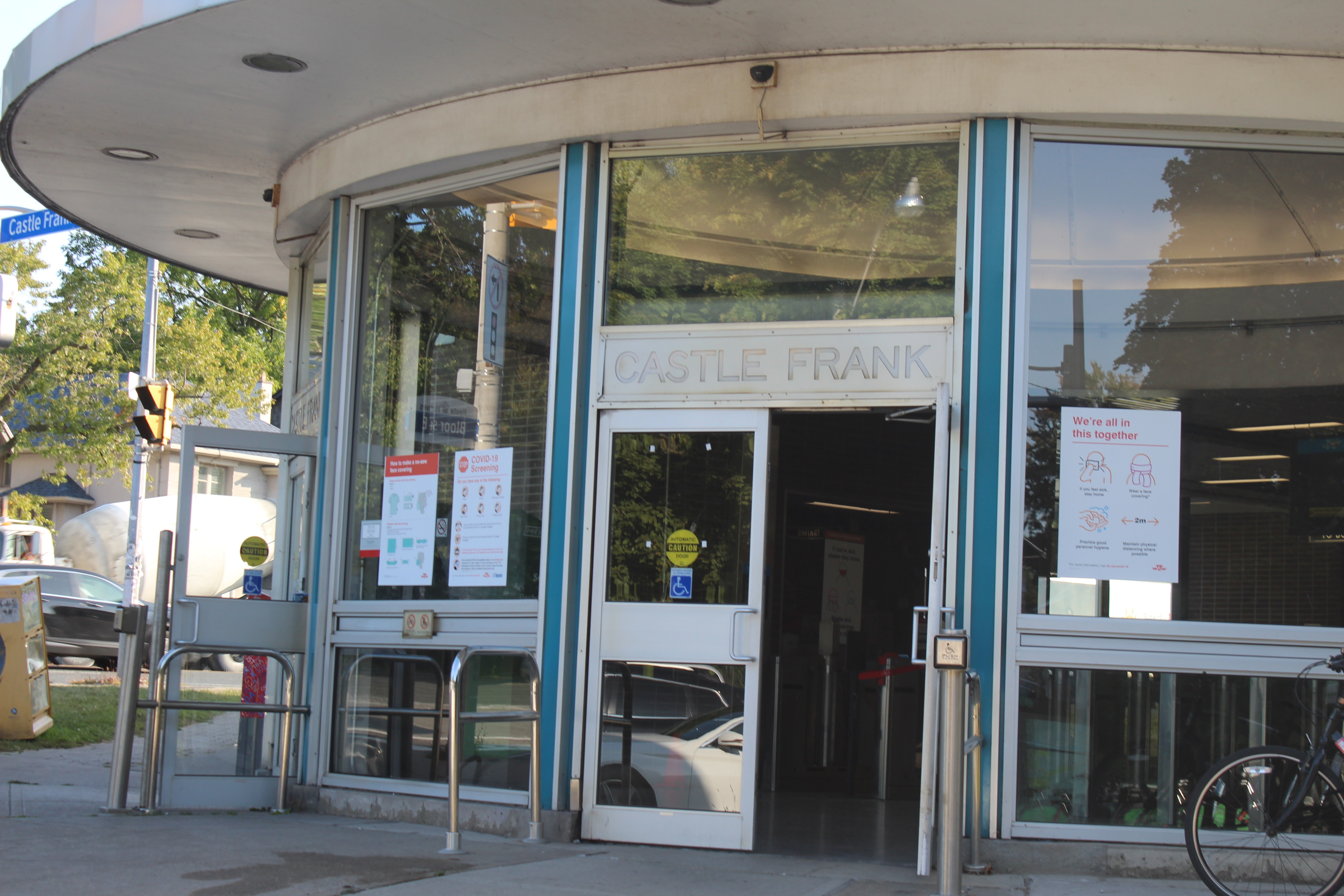
Station entrance

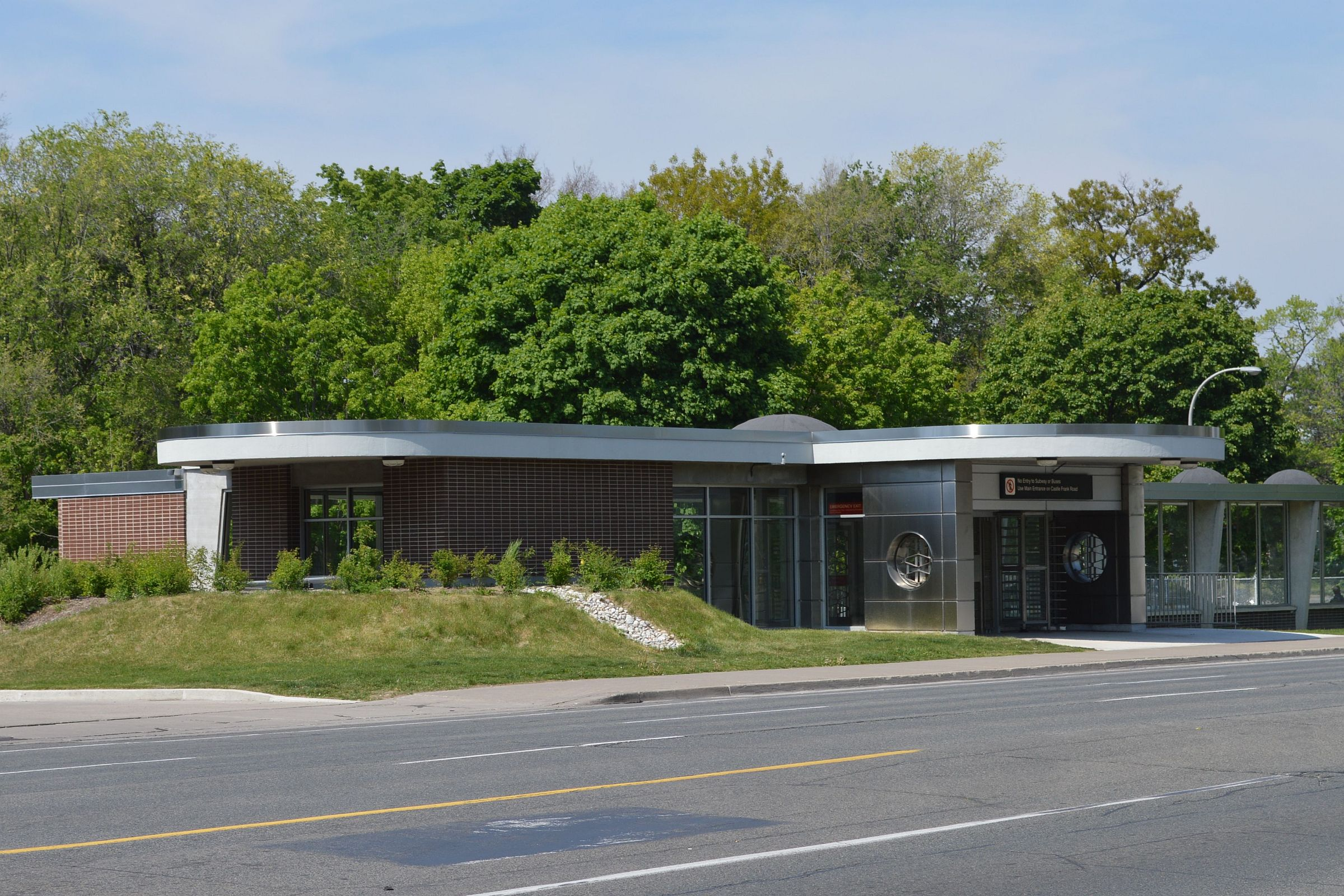
The much-delayed second exit, which opened in 2012

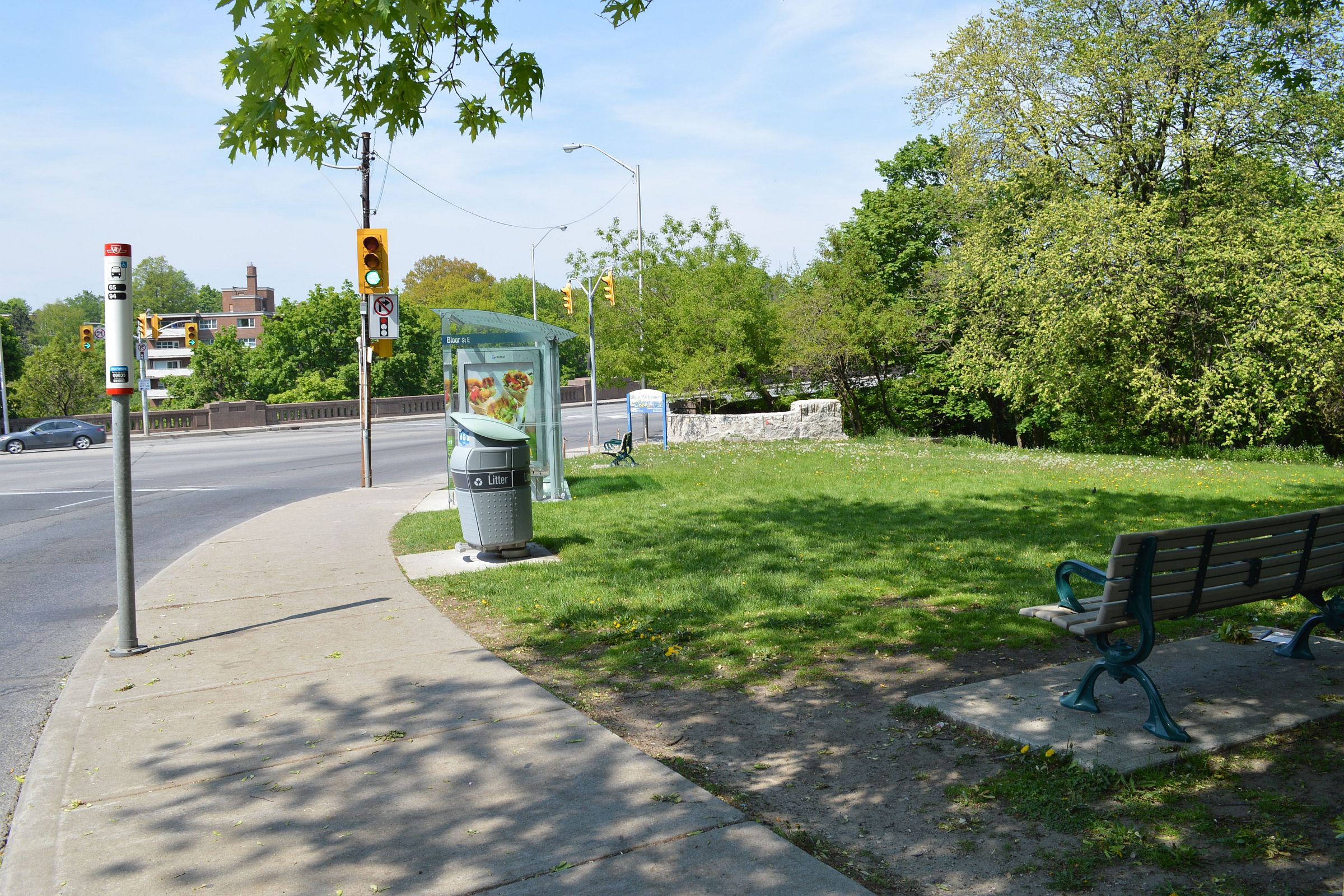
Bloor–Parliament Parkette in 2013 has a bus stop beside it

== History ==
Castle Frank station, opened in 1966, is named after the community that it serves. Its streets, and the brook that flows through it, are in turn named after John Graves Simcoe's summer residence in the area overlooking the Don River, which burned down in 1829. The residence was named after his son Francis Simcoe. In 1954, a historical marker was placed in Prince Edward Viaduct Parkette, near the site of the historic Castle Frank residence, on the south side of Bloor Street at Castle Frank Road.

The Parliament streetcar line operated to its northerly terminus at the Viaduct Loop until 1966. No consideration was given to construct the short connection, from that location at Bloor Street East and Parliament Street across the Rosedale Ravine, which would have made the streetcar route a major feeder line to the subway station. The site of the streetcar loop is now Rekai Family Parkette.

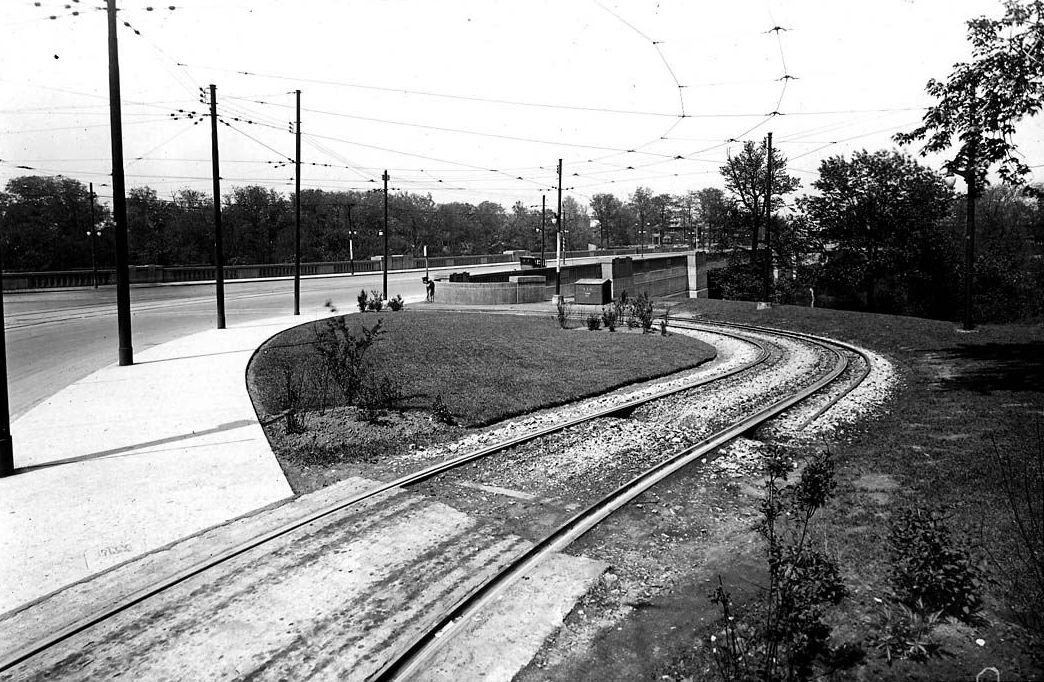
Viaduct Loop in 1926 was a terminus for streetcars

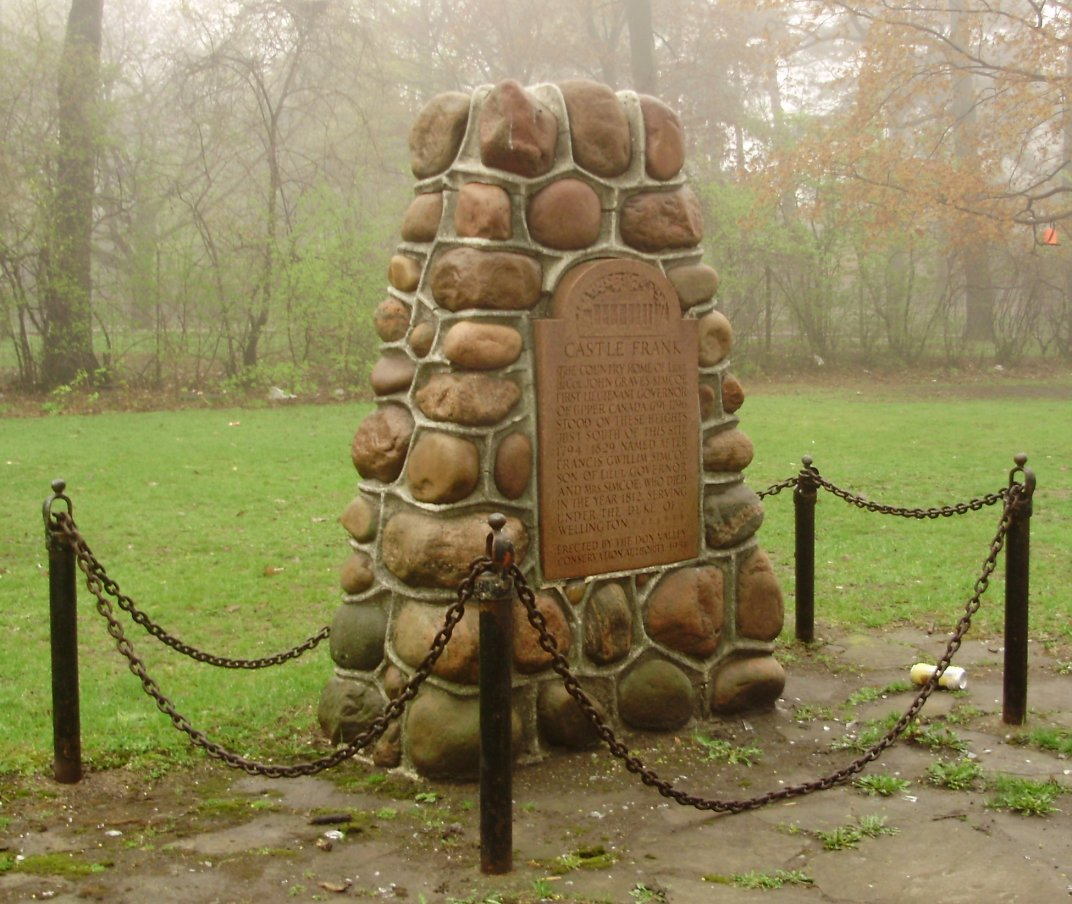
Castle Frank historical marker

== Subway infrastructure in the vicinity ==
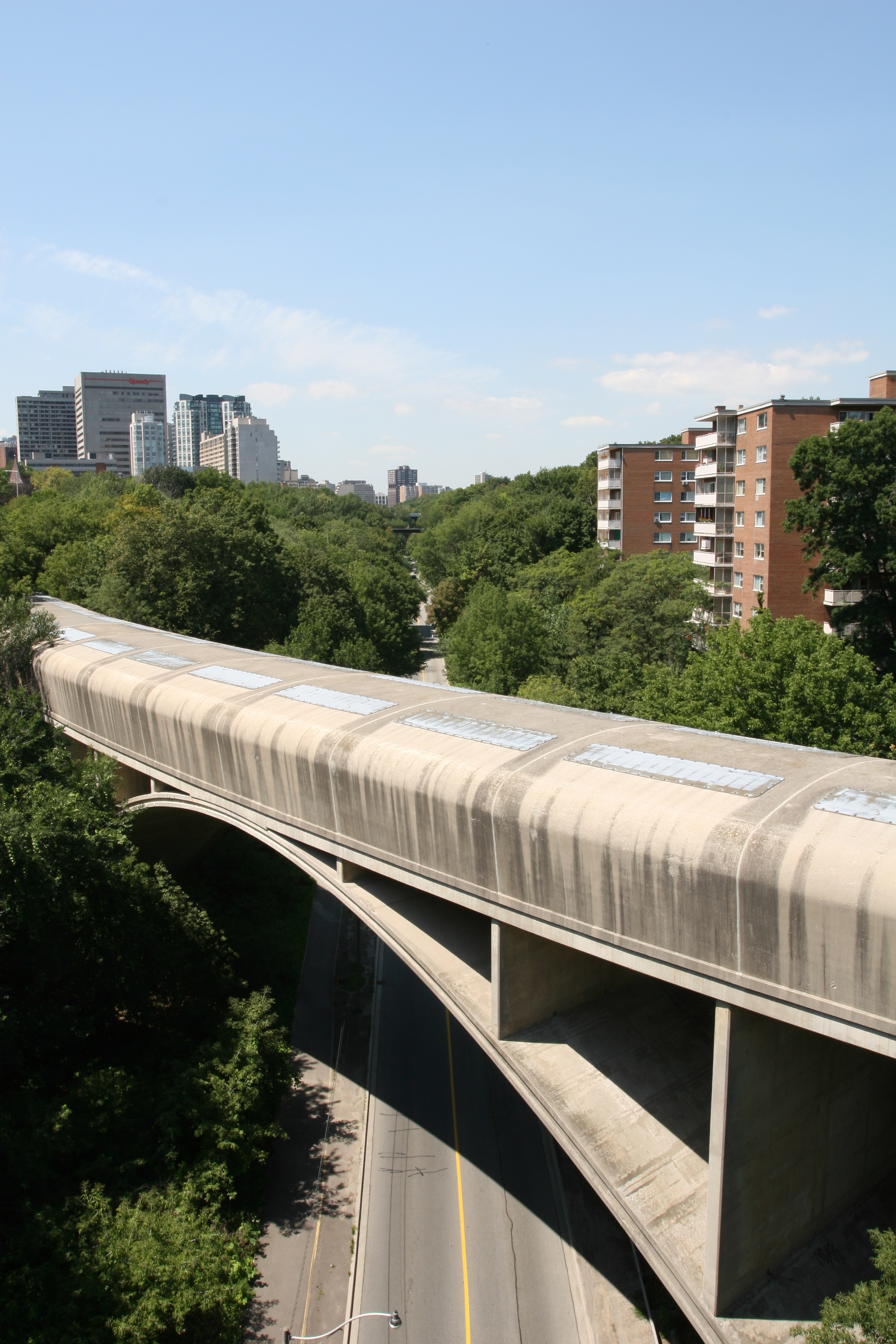
Covered bridge spanning Rosedale Valley Road

East of the station, the line runs under Bloor Street to use the lower deck of the Prince Edward Viaduct. At the end of the Viaduct, it swings to parallel Danforth Avenue on the north side. Immediately west of the station, the line crosses the Rosedale Ravine in a covered concrete bridge, then continues in a tunnel to Sherbourne station.

== Surface connections ==
When the subway is closed, buses do not enter the station. TTC routes serving the station include:

Bay number	Route	Name	Additional information
1	Unloading		
2	65	Parliament	Southbound to Queens Quay & Lower Sherbourne
2	Wheel-Trans		
3	94A	Wellesley	Westbound to Ossington station via Wellesley station
3	94B	Wellesley	Westbound to Wellesley station
N/A	300A	Bloor–Danfoth	Westbound to Pearson Airport; eastbound to Warden Avenue
N/A	300B	Bloor–Danfoth	Westbound to West Mall; eastbound to Kennedy station
N/A	365	Parliament	Blue Night service; southbound to the Esplanade
