= Winchester Hotel =

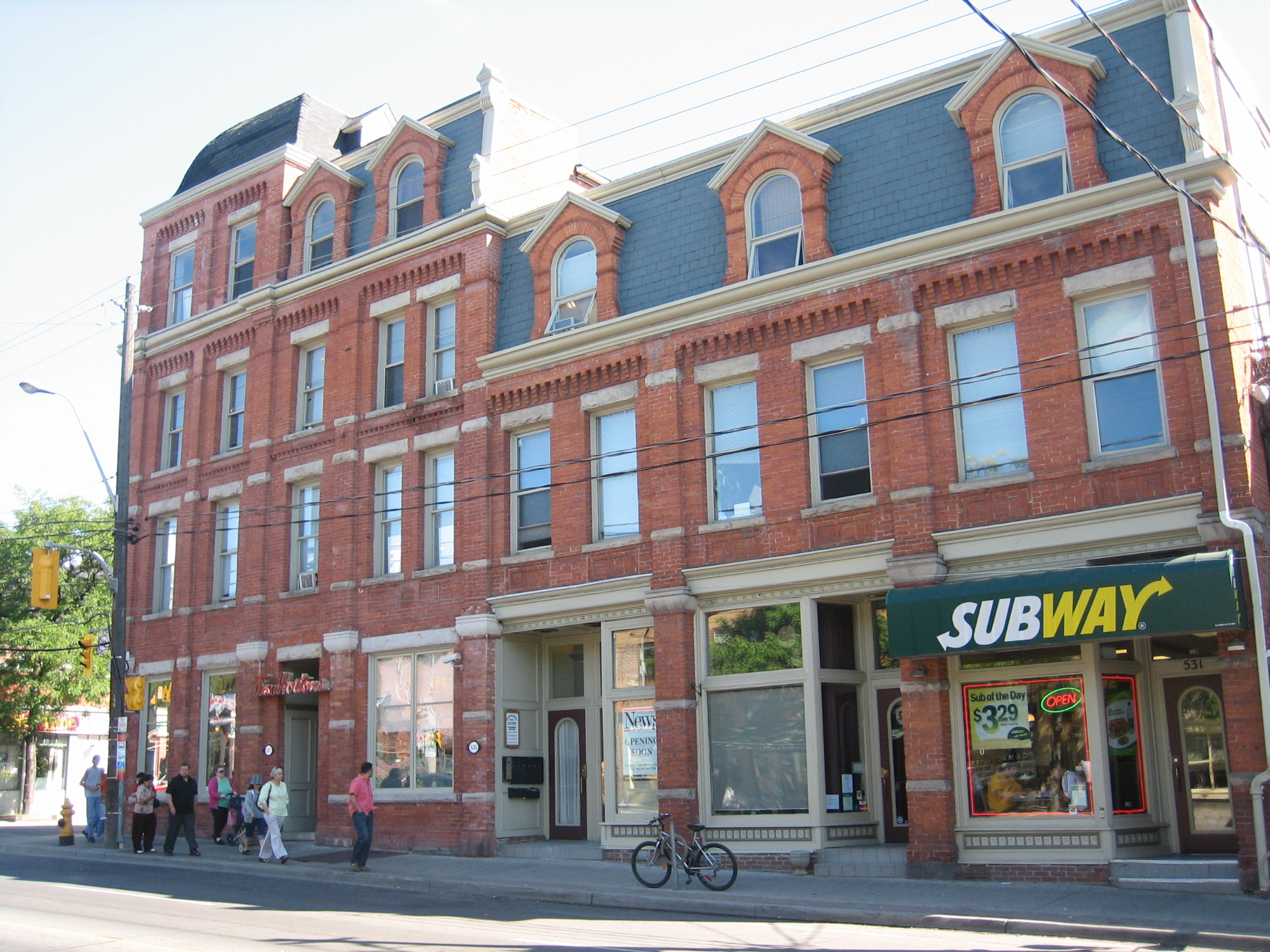
- Building shown in 2007.
- Interactive map of the Winchester Hotel area

General information
- Architectural style: Second Empire (exterior), Art Moderne (interior)
- Location: 531 Parliament Street, Toronto
- Year built: 1880, 1888
- Renovated: 1941

Technical details
- Material: red brick
- Floor count: 3½-storey Winchester Hotel with 2½-storey south wing

Design and construction
- Architects: Thomas Kennedy (1880 building), Benjamin Swartz (1941 alterations)
- Architecture firm: Kennedy and Holland (initial building)

Ontario Heritage Act
- Official name: 531 Parliament St
- Designated: 1995

The Winchester Hotel is a preserved commercial building, located at 531 Parliament Street, in Cabbagetown, Toronto. The former hotel building was listed as a heritage building by the city in 1975 and was designated under Part IV of the Ontario Heritage Act in 1995.

It was one of the five or six major hotels in Toronto when it was built, until the King Edward Hotel opened in 1903.

The building was designed by architect Thomas Kennedy in the 1880s. It was known for having a dome on the roof, with a flagpole "that was visible throughout the city"

Plans to bring a Tim Hortons to the site in 2005 caused consternation among local residents and heritage activists.

== Heritage details ==
The building currently known as the Winchester Hotel opened in the 1880s as the Lakeview Hotel. It once had a lantern mounted atop a cupola on the roof, that was removed, either in 1941 when it was given an Art Moderne facelift, or in 1954 (sources are unsure). A replica was added in 2021, using the same architectural firm that was renovating Massey Hall at the time. Its listing on the Canadian Register of Historic Places notes: "The imposing 3½-storey red brick Winchester Hotel with a 2½-storey red brick south wing, and the adjoining two-storey red brick Winchester Hall are located on the southeast corner of Parliament Street and Winchester Street in the Toronto neighbourhood of Cabbagetown.”
