= Castle Frank Brook =

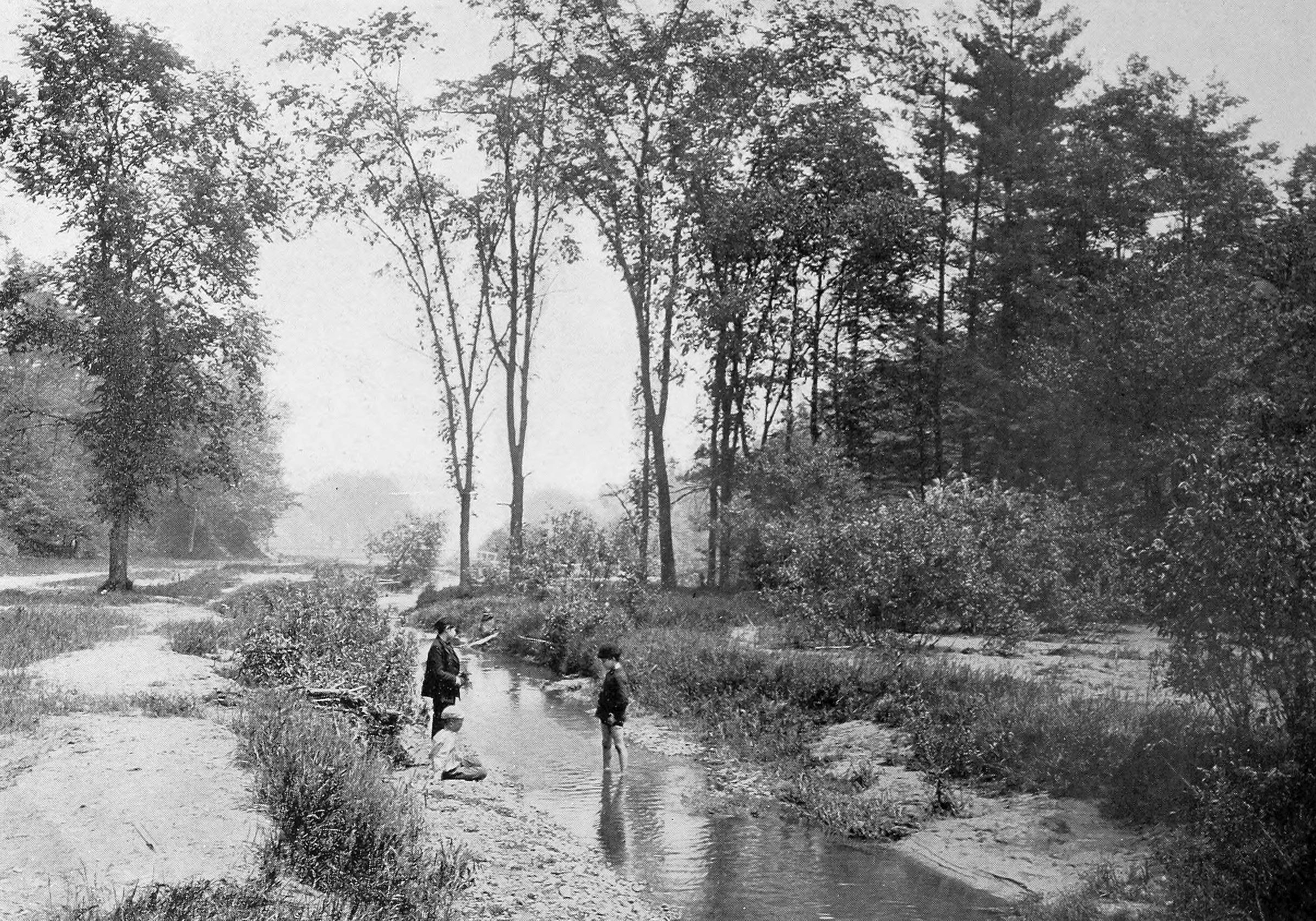
- Rosedale Ravine, 1890

- Location of the mouth of Castle Frank Brook in Toronto
- Etymology: Named after the summer residence of John Graves Simcoe, that had been named for his son Francis

Location
- Country: Canada
- Province: Ontario
- Region: Greater Toronto Area
- Municipality: Toronto

Physical characteristics
- Source: Fairbank Reach
  - coordinates: 43°42′58″N 79°27′16″W
  - elevation: 177 m (581 ft)
- Mouth: Don River
  - coordinates: 43°40′11″N 79°21′31″W
  - elevation: 76 m (249 ft)
- Length: 12 km (7.5 mi)

Basin features
- Tributaries
  - left: Mashquoteh Creek, Forest Hill Stream, Cedarvale Stream
  - right: Lamb's Creek, Parson Stream

Castle Frank Brook is a buried creek and south-west flowing tributary of the Don River in central and north-western Toronto, Ontario, Canada, originating near the intersection of Lawrence Avenue and Dufferin Street.

Residential and industrial development in the former suburban cities of York and North York have obliterated nearly all traces of its original course and topography in the uppermost reaches, but the original stream valley is evident in several older districts bordering the lower reaches. Sections of the lower valley include Cedarvale Park ravine, the Nordheimer Ravine near the intersection of St. Clair Avenue and Spadina Road, and the Rosedale Ravine just above the brook's confluence with the Don. Water still runs in short segments in Cedarvale Park and the Nordheimer Ravine but this is only a collection of surface runoff and ravine slope seepage. The channels are all artificially created and run into a storm sewer that carries the remnants of the brook.

The southern section of Vaughan Road roughly parallels the brook's course, bypassing the steep slopes of the Cedarvale ravine. The brook's topographic influence is still evident at Ramsden Park, to the north of the intersection of Avenue Road and Davenport Road, representing the boundary of the densely developed Yorkville district. The Toronto Transit Commission's Spadina subway line follows the path of the creek from Cedarvale station to St. Clair West station, finally deviating southward at Spadina Road.

The brook is named for the summer residence of Ontario's first colonial governor, John Graves Simcoe, which in turn was named for Simcoe's son, Francis Gwillim. It was built either on the west side of the Don River near the modern Prince Edward (Bloor) Viaduct, or on the east side of Cabbagetown near the river. The home featured a façade in the Georgian architectural style. It was abandoned when Simcoe returned to England in 1794, and burned down in 1829. Castle Frank subway station takes its name from the former residence. A second home of the same name was built north of this site by Sir Edward Kemp. It was demolished in 1962 for the current Rosedale Heights School of the Arts. The site of the original summer home can be seen from aerial photos as a partially cleared area with a ring-like shape.

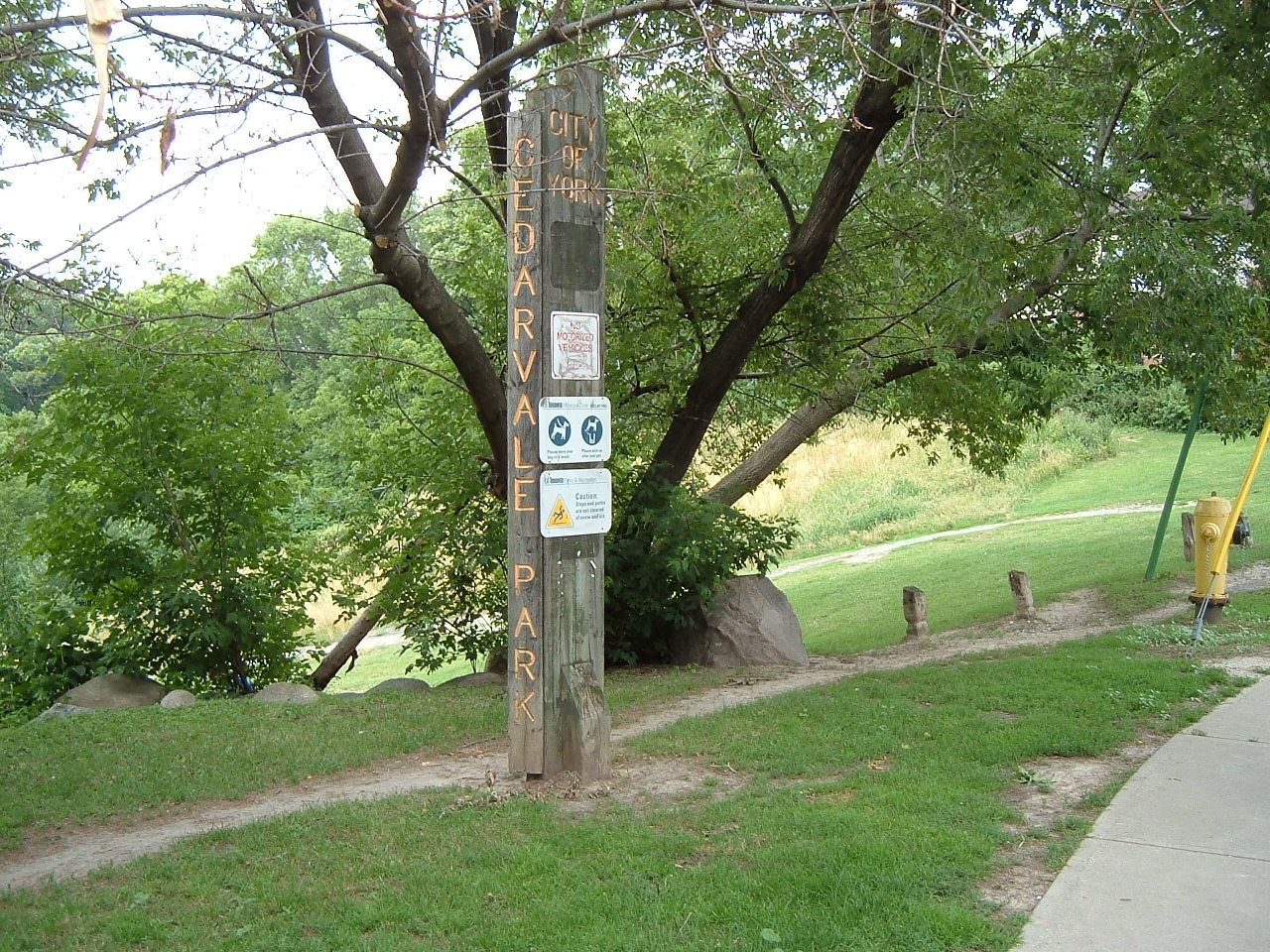
Cedarvale Park

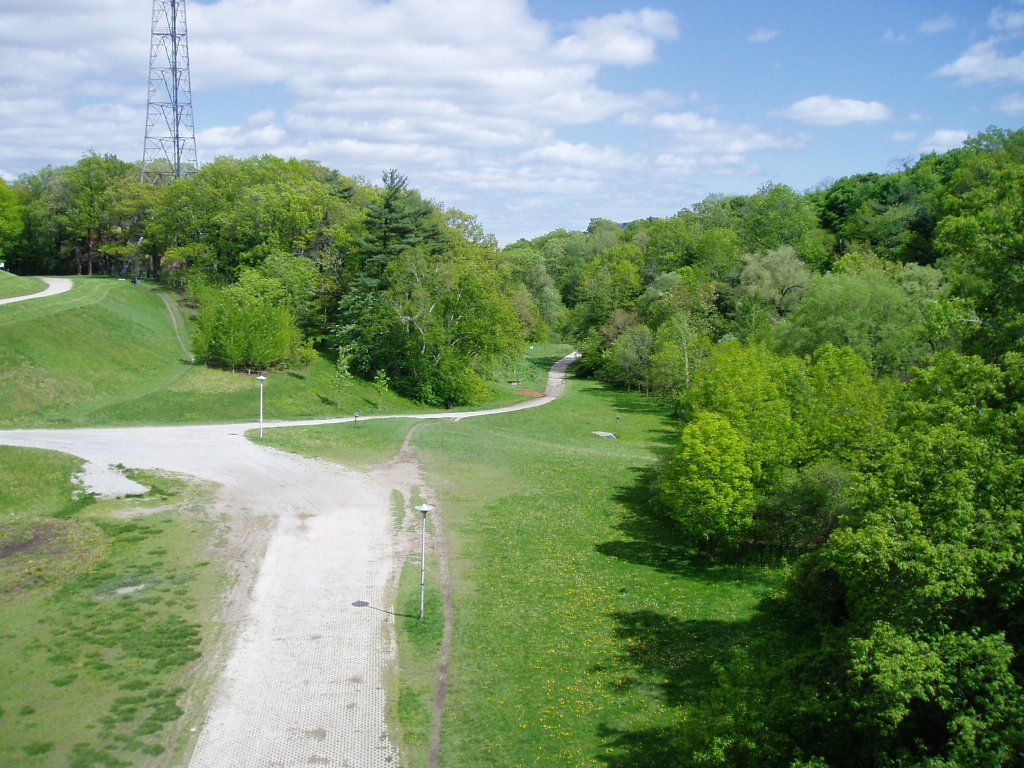
The Nordheimer Ravine, named after Samuel Nordheimer, a piano importer who lived nearby

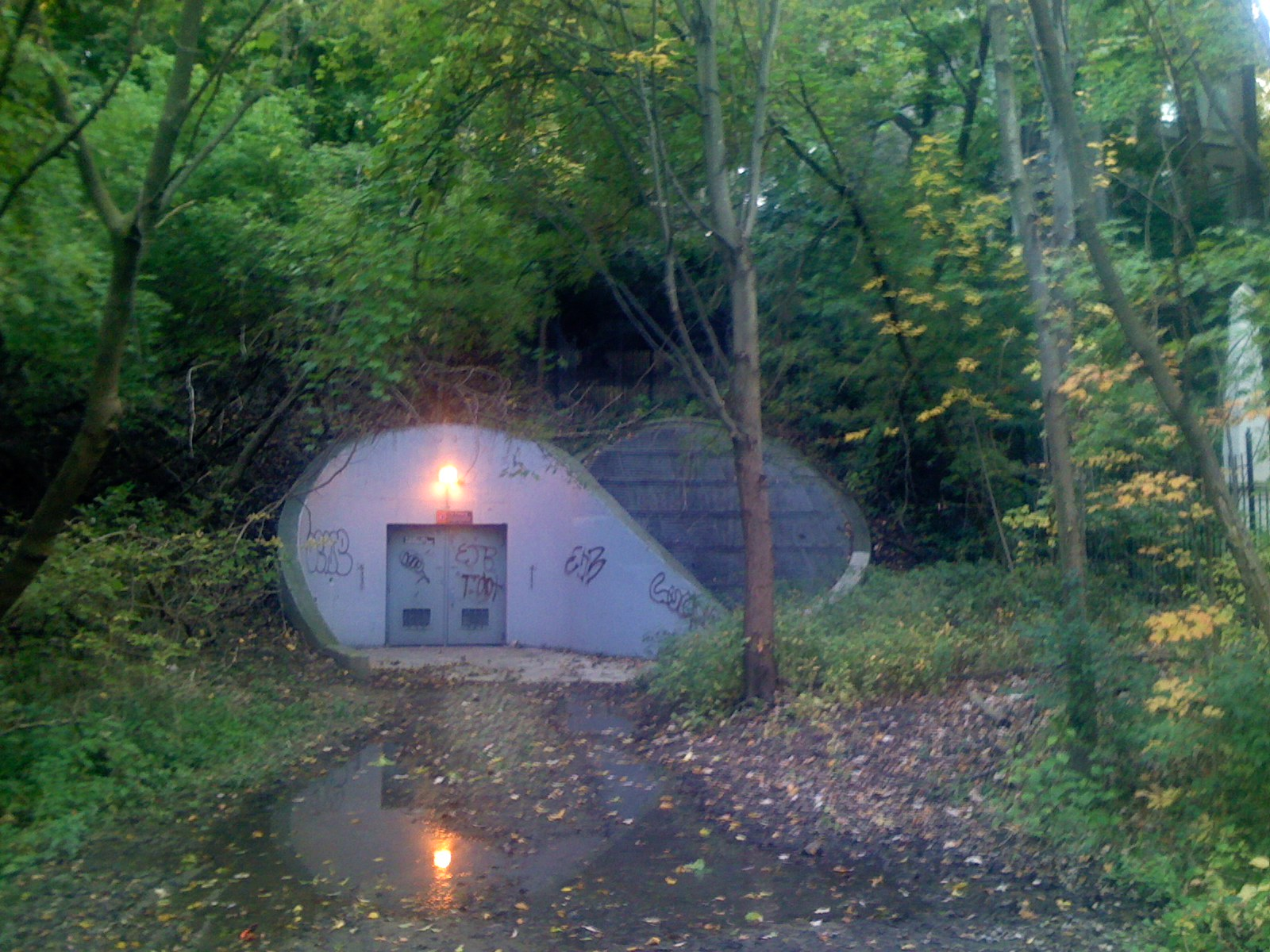
The Russell Hill Emergency exit located in Winston Churchill Park

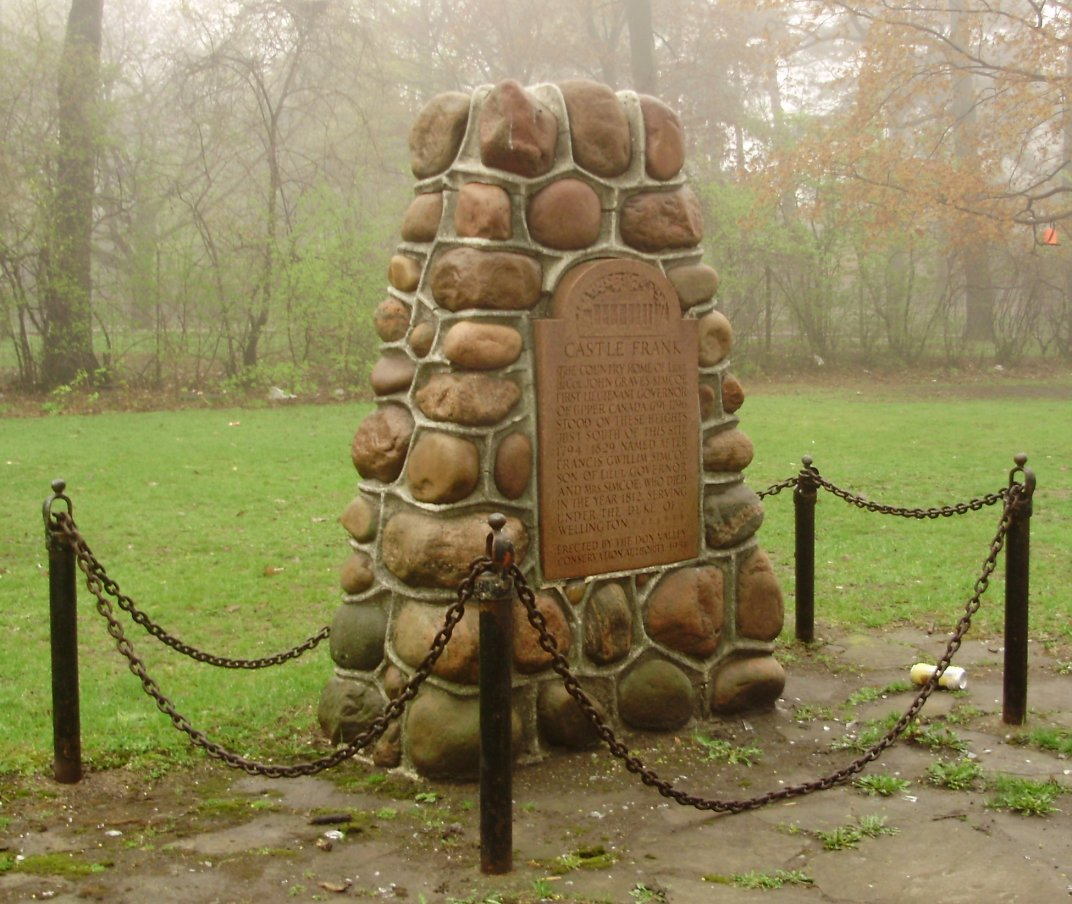
Historical marker, located south of Bloor Street adjacent to Castle Frank station, was placed on the approximate site of the historic Castle Frank residence in 1954

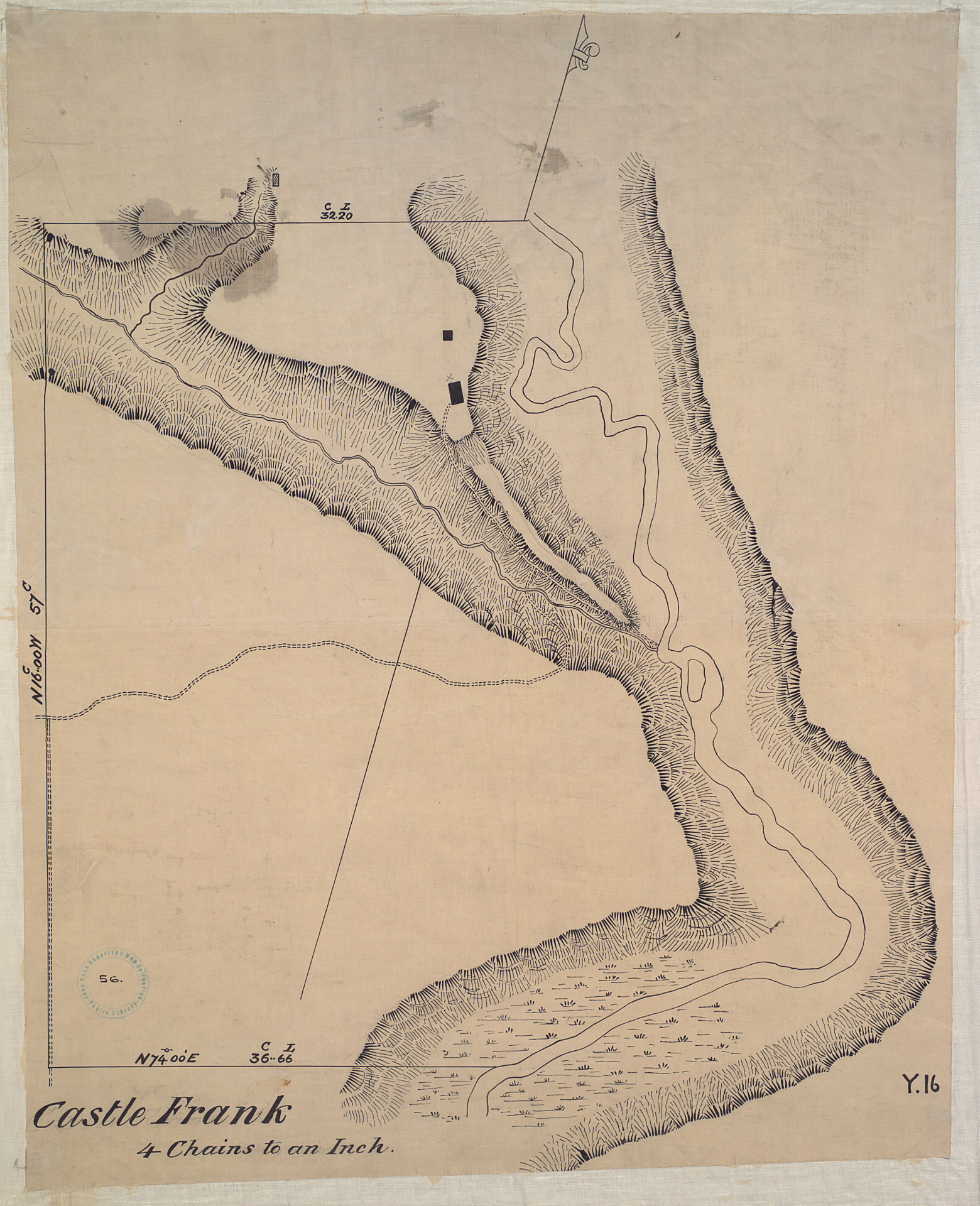
Map of Castle Frank

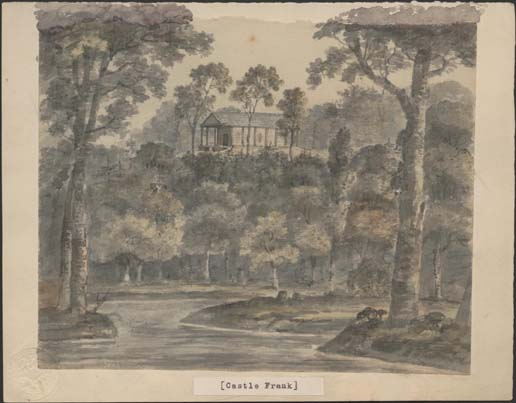
Sketch of Castle Frank by Elizabeth Simcoe, 1796

The waterway was once referred to as Severn Creek after local brewer John Severn. Severn also operated breweries in San Francisco and Davenport, Iowa (Severn Ale Brewery) during his brief absence from Toronto in 1858-1863.

== See also ==
- List of rivers of Ontario
