= Rosedale Heights School of the Arts =

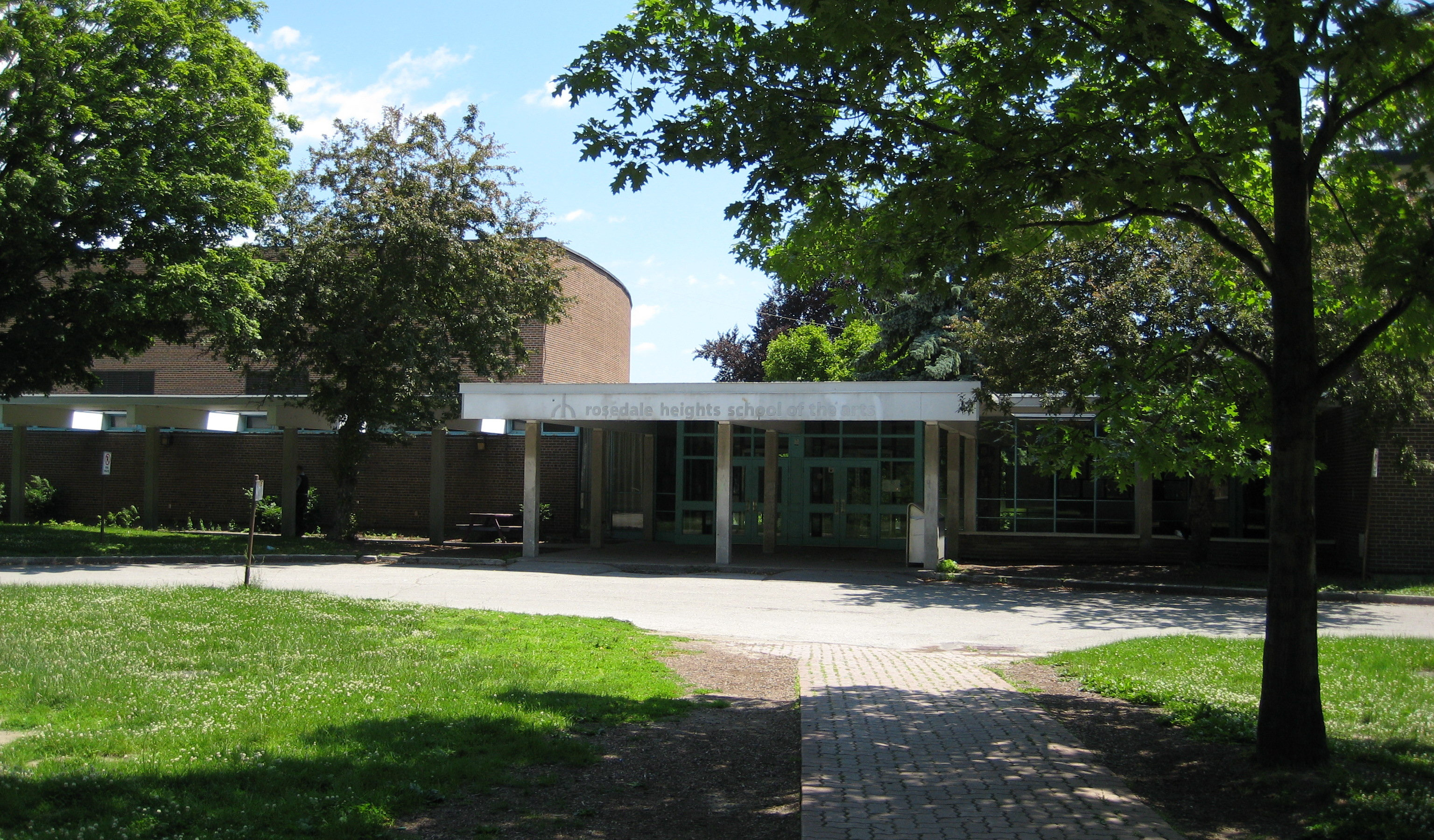

Location
- 711 Bloor Street East; Toronto, Ontario, M4W 1J4; Canada; 43.673968°N 79.365830°W

Information
- School type: Arts High School
- School board: Toronto District School Board
- Superintendent: Jennifer Chan
- Area trustee: Deborah Williams
- School number: 5630
- Principal: Joe Ghassibe
- Grades: 9-12
- Enrolment: 1,079 (2021-22)
- Language: English
- Schedule type: Semestered
- Colours: Black, Green
- Mascot: Raven
- Newspaper: The Spectacle
- Website: rhsa.ca
- Last updated: September 16, 2026

Rosedale Heights School of the Arts (RHSA) is an arts-based high school in Toronto, Ontario, Canada.

== History ==
Formerly Castle Frank, the school has been reinvented and re-purposed by Principal Barrie Sketchley. Castle Frank School was opened in 1963 on a site that had historical significance — Sir Albert Edward Kemp, a Conservative Member of Parliament and militia minister during the First World War, had previously built a 24-room manor on the property, which he also named Castle Frank in honour of the area's colonial history. That manor was demolished in 1962 to make way for the school. The institution operated as Castle Frank until the 1990s, when a change in educational model led to a rebrand, first as Rosedale Heights Secondary School and later as Rosedale Heights School of the Arts. It is a semestered school with an emphasis on the arts. Students can take dance, dramatic arts, music-instrumental (band or strings), vocals, visual and media arts. In 2005, Maclean's Magazine named RHSA one of the best arts-focus high schools in Canada, as well as one of the three best special-focus schools in Canada.

In 2023, principal Barrie Sketchley was honored by the Toronto School Administrators Association for being the "longest-career principal in TDSB history and in the province of Ontario", having worked as a TDSB principal for the past 40+ years, and as the Rosedale Heights School of the Arts principal since its founding more than 30 years ago.

In 2025, the TDSB made a decision to transfer Sketchley to retirement. On June 12, students at Rosedale walked out of class to protest the board's decision. A change.org petition was also set up during the protests and gained approximately 2909 signatures. In August, Jennifer Chan said in a letter to the school community that the TDSB allowed Principal Sketchley to remain at the school for 2025-26 school year before retiring in June 2026 and Joe Ghassibe becoming principal.

On October 13th, 2026, former principal Barrie Sketchley died of unknown complications at 85. In response, the school plans to rename their library to the Barrie Sketchley Library, while also hosting a secondary celebration of life, following the previous private funeral.

== Overview ==
RHSA accepts students from all over the Greater Toronto Area. It is the only arts school in the Toronto District School Board that encourages students to explore interdisciplinary arts by not expecting students to choose a "major" in one art and making students select a variety of arts courses in their first two years at the school.

RHSA has a 670-seat auditorium, two band/orchestra rehearsal spaces, three fully equipped dance studios, two drama rooms, a dark room, a vocal room, and various visual art studios used for printmaking, graphic design, etc. The school is also home to an Olympic-size swimming pool.

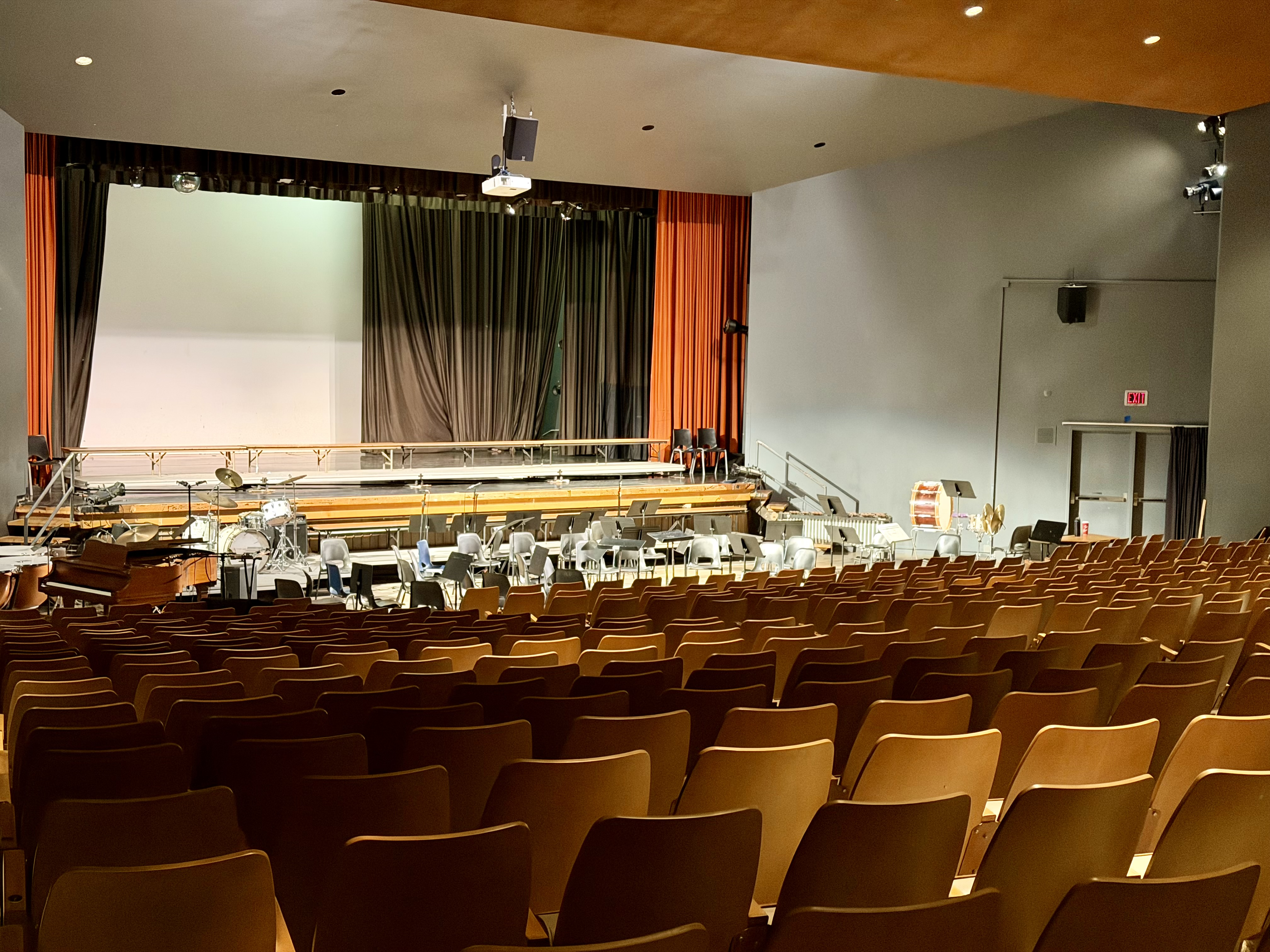
The auditorium, 2026

== Musical theatre performances ==
2012-present
Performance	Year
Anything Goes	2006
Hair	2013
Cabaret	2014
Rent	2016
Spring Awakening	2018
Mamma Mia!	2023
The Addams Family	2024
Les Miserables	2025
Anything Goes	2026

Rosedale Heights cancelled a performance of Anything Goes in 2020 due to the COVID-19 pandemic. It was later performed in 2026.

== Notable alumni ==
- Petra Collins - photographer
- Laysla De Oliveira - actress
- Leandra Earl - keyboardist, The Beaches
- Leland Whitty - Canadian instrumentalist part of BadBadNotGood
- Eliza Enman-McDaniel - drummer, The Beaches
- Jordan Miller - singer and bassist, The Beaches
- Kylie Miller - lead guitarist, The Beaches
- Kristy Yang - actress

== See also ==
- Education in Ontario
- List of secondary schools in Ontario

== See also ==
- List of high schools in Ontario
