= Scarborough Centre Bus Terminal =

Bus station in Toronto, Ontario, Canada

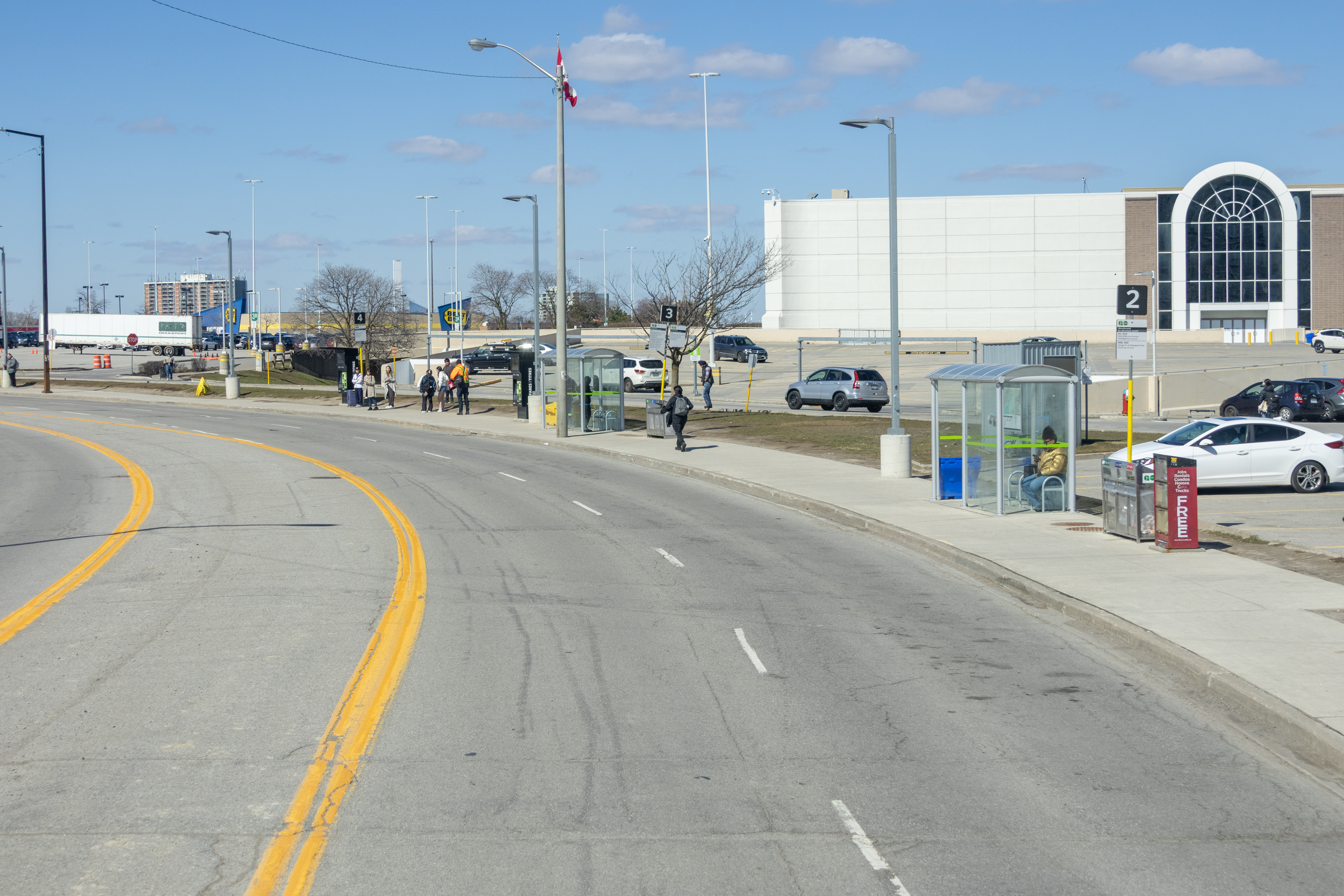

General information
- Location: 300 Borough Drive, Toronto, Ontario, Canada
- Coordinates: 43°46′29″N 79°15′24″W
- Owner: City of Toronto
- Bus stands: 6
- Bus operators: GO Transit; Megabus (Coach Canada)
- Connections: Scarborough Centre (TTC)

Other information
- Station code: GO Transit: SCAR

History
- Opened: 1985
Location

Scarborough Centre Bus Terminal is a regional and intercity bus terminal in Scarborough City Centre in Toronto, Ontario, Canada, located near its namesake rapid transit station on Line 3 Scarborough of the Toronto subway. It is served by GO Transit buses. The terminal is near the Scarborough Town Centre shopping mall and the Scarborough Civic Centre. Until 2022, Megabus (Coach Canada), and other private coach services used the terminal, but have moved to temporary on-street locations nearby due to subway construction.

The original regional bus terminal opened in 1985 adjacent to the Line 3 station but was relocated to a temporary on-street terminal on Borough Drive starting October 1, 2022. Line 3 closed permanently in 2023 and was replaced with TTC bus service, which is expected to continue until 2030 when the Scarborough extension of Line 2 Bloor–Danforth is scheduled to open for revenue service. The TTC required more space to handle replacement buses and required GO Transit and intercity buses to vacate the original terminal. A new Scarborough Centre Bus Terminal is expected to be completed in 2030 east of Scarborough Town Centre as part of the planned new Scarborough Centre station. The future bus terminal will also be the western terminal of the proposed Durham–Scarborough bus rapid transit corridor.

== Operators ==
=== GO Transit ===
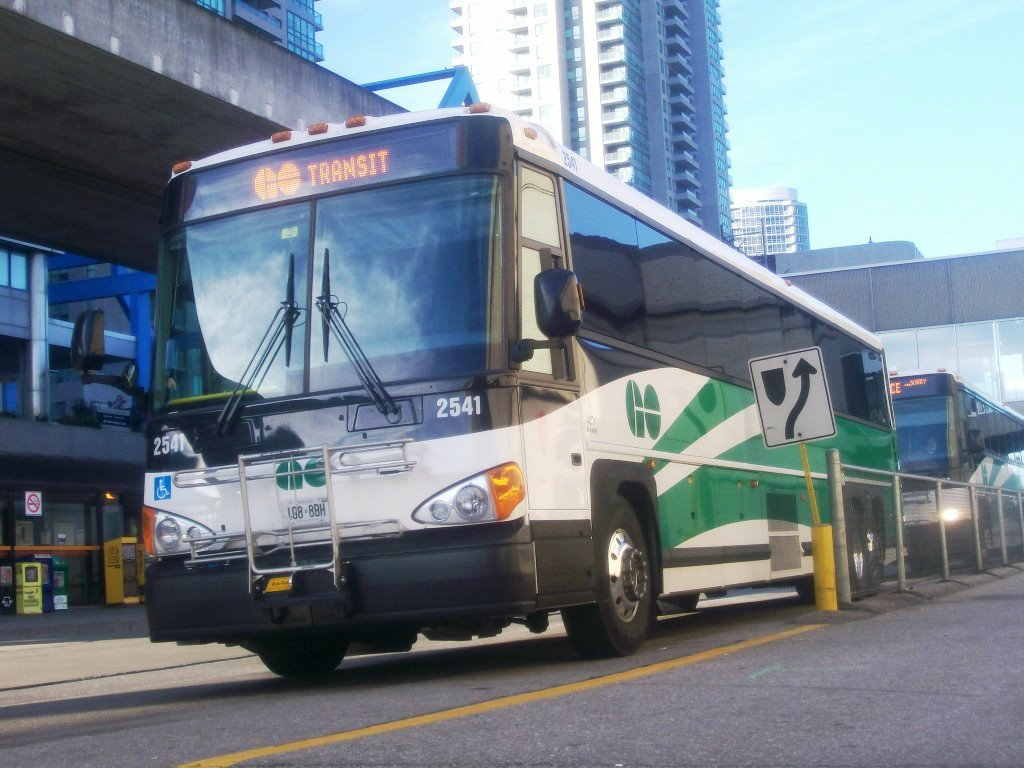
GO Transit MCI bus at the terminal

- Hwy 407 East GO Bus service (route 41) between Hamilton GO Centre and Pickering GO Station via Centennial College and University of Toronto at Scarborough
- Oshawa/Yorkdale GO Bus service (route 92) via Scarborough Centre Bus Terminal and York Mills Bus Terminal
- Durham College / UOIT GO Bus service (route 93)
- Oshawa/Finch Express GO Bus service (route 96) via Whitby GO Station, Ajax GO Station, and Sheppard–Yonge station

=== Relocated services ===
The private inter-city bus lines operate nearby at on-street locations.

- Megabus service to Kingston, Montreal, and Ottawa
- Orleans Express service to Kingston and Ottawa
- FlixBus – Ottawa

== Terminal location ==
=== Original terminal (1985–2022) ===
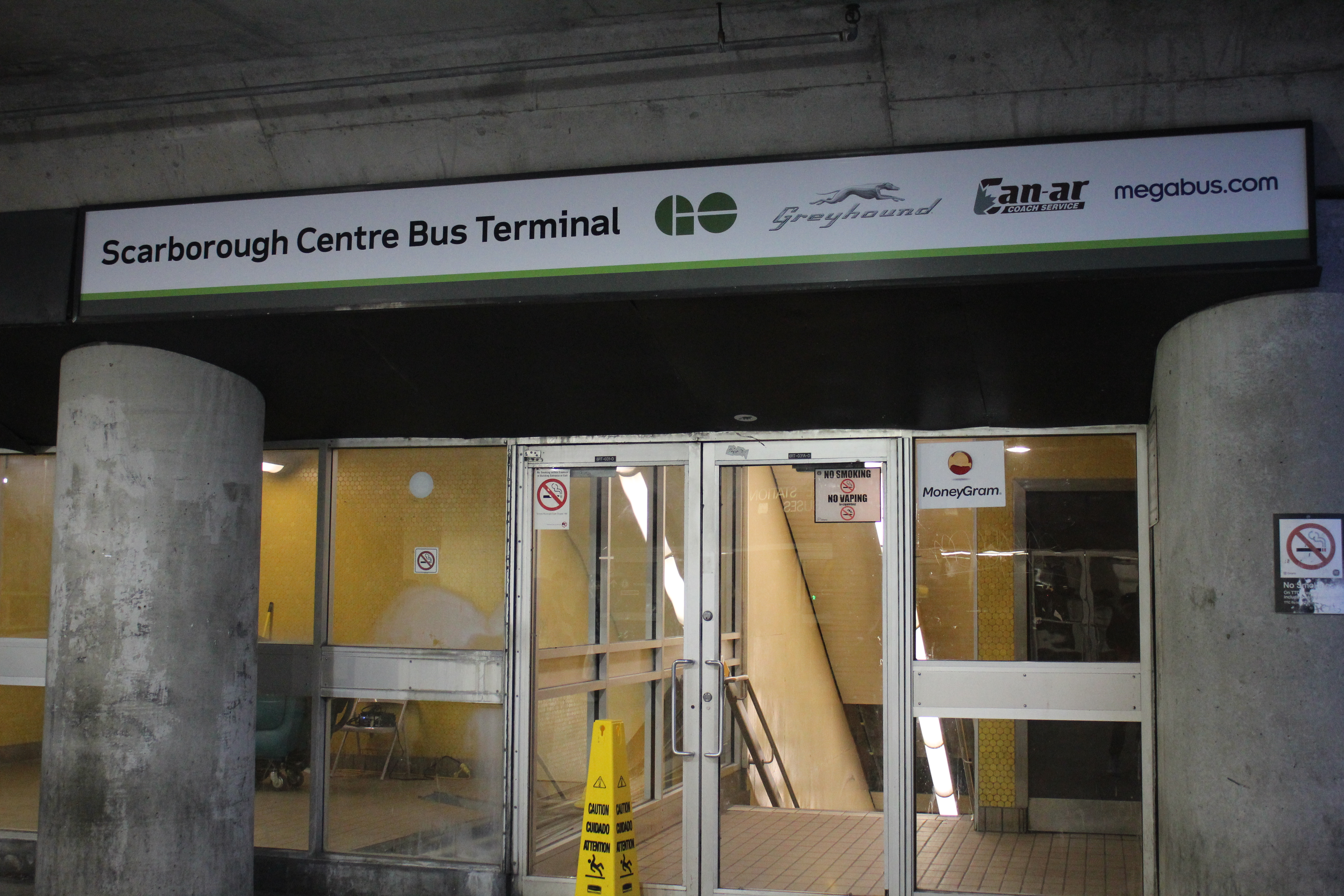
Entrance to former bus terminal in 2019

Opened in 1985, the regional bus terminal was originally located adjacent to Scarborough Centre station on Line 3 Scarborough of the Toronto subway. With the closure of Line 3 in 2023 and its replacement by TTC bus service until about 2030, the TTC needed the terminal space for its own buses. Thus, GO Transit and intercity buses had to vacate the original location so that the area could be reconfigured for more TTC buses. On October 1, 2022, the regional bus terminal was relocated to Borough Drive on the west side of Scarborough Town Centre.

=== Temporary terminal (2022–2030) ===
On October 1, 2022, a temporary on-street terminal opened, replacing the original bus terminal. The temporary terminal has six bus bays located on the east side of Borough Drive between Progress Avenue and Triton Road. The terminal location is near the west side of Scarborough Town Centre shopping mall. TTC bus routes 21 Brimley and 43 Kennedy have stops within 50 to 250 metres (160 to 820 ft) from the temporary terminal. This temporary terminal will be replaced by a future terminal expected to open in 2030.

=== Future terminal (from 2030) ===
A new Scarborough Centre Bus Terminal is expected to open in 2030 east of Scarborough Town Centre as part of the planned new Scarborough Centre station on the Scarborough extension of Line 2 Bloor–Danforth. It will be adjacent to a new Scarborough Centre station, which will be located on the east side of McCowan Road, north of the Line 3 right-of-way next to the site of McCowan station. The new bus terminal will also be the western terminal of the proposed Durham–Scarborough bus rapid transit corridor.

== Nearby landmarks ==
Located in Scarborough's city centre, nearby landmarks include Scarborough Town Centre shopping mall, the Scarborough Civic Centre, Albert Campbell Square, the Canada Centre government offices, Consilium Place and the Scarborough YMCA.

== See also ==
- Union Station Bus Terminal
- Toronto Coach Terminal
