= Durham–Scarborough bus rapid transit =

Proposed bus corridor in eastern Greater Toronto Area, Canada

Overview
- Locale: Toronto (Scarborough), Pickering, Ajax, Whitby, Oshawa
- Transit type: Bus rapid transit

Operation
- Operation will start: 2041 (estimated)

Technical
- System length: 36 km (22 mi)

Durham–Scarborough bus rapid transit (DSBRT) is a future bus rapid transit corridor proposed by Metrolinx for the eastern part of the Greater Toronto Area in Southern Ontario, Canada. The 36-kilometre (22 mi) bus corridor will run from downtown Oshawa to Scarborough Town Centre in Toronto, mainly along Durham Region Highway 2 (formerly Ontario Highway 2) in Durham Region and Ellesmere Road in the Scarborough district of Toronto. Dedicated bus lanes will be used where feasible. Buses of the Toronto Transit Commission, Durham Region Transit and GO Transit would use the busway. Metrolinx has indicated that the BRT could be easily converted to LRT in the future if required.

The BRT will be 36 kilometres (22 mi) long with 49 stops and is estimated to cost $585 million. The BRT would operate mostly in curb-separated lanes in the middle of the road. Metrolinx expects construction of segments in Durham Region to begin in 2022, and estimates that the BRT will carry 38,000 passengers per day by 2041.

== Route ==
From Scarborough Town Centre, the Durham–Scarborough BRT corridor would run east along Ellesmere Road to Kingston Road (Highway 2). The DSBRT would continue further east along Kingston Road crossing the Rouge River into Durham Region, passing through the municipalities of Pickering, Ajax and Whitby, and terminating in downtown Oshawa.

=== Scarborough ===
The western terminus of the DSBRT will be a future Scarborough Centre Bus Terminal adjacent to a future Scarborough Centre station to be located on a planned extension of Line 2 Bloor–Danforth in Toronto. The new bus terminal, subway station and subway extension are all in the planning stage and are expected to open in 2030. There is an existing Scarborough Centre Bus Terminal adjacent to Scarborough Town Centre, but it is expected to close in 2022 in preparation for the decommissioning of Line 3 Scarborough in 2023.

Fourteen of the BRT's 49 stops will be in Scarborough. During peak periods, TTC, DRT and GO Transit buses combined would provide a 2-minute bus frequency; however, the majority of buses using the BRT in Scarborough will be those of the TTC. Most of the BRT will be in the centre of the road; however, if that is impractical, some sections may have bus lanes on the side of the road with curbside stops.

As of July 2021, the plan for the corridor would have dedicated bus lanes along Ellesmere Road between McCowan Road and Kingston Road. Between Military Trail and Kingston Road, this would require the widening of Ellesmere Road and the possible removal of trees along this residential street. Thus, the Highland Creek Community Association objected to the proposal in this area. Local residents preferred either that the BRT detour via Sheppard Avenue and Morningside Avenue or used mixed traffic on the disputed section.

Major sources of ridership along within Scarborough would be the University of Toronto Scarborough and Centennial College’s Morningside campus. As of November 2021, the Scarborough section of the BRT is not yet funded.

=== Pickering ===
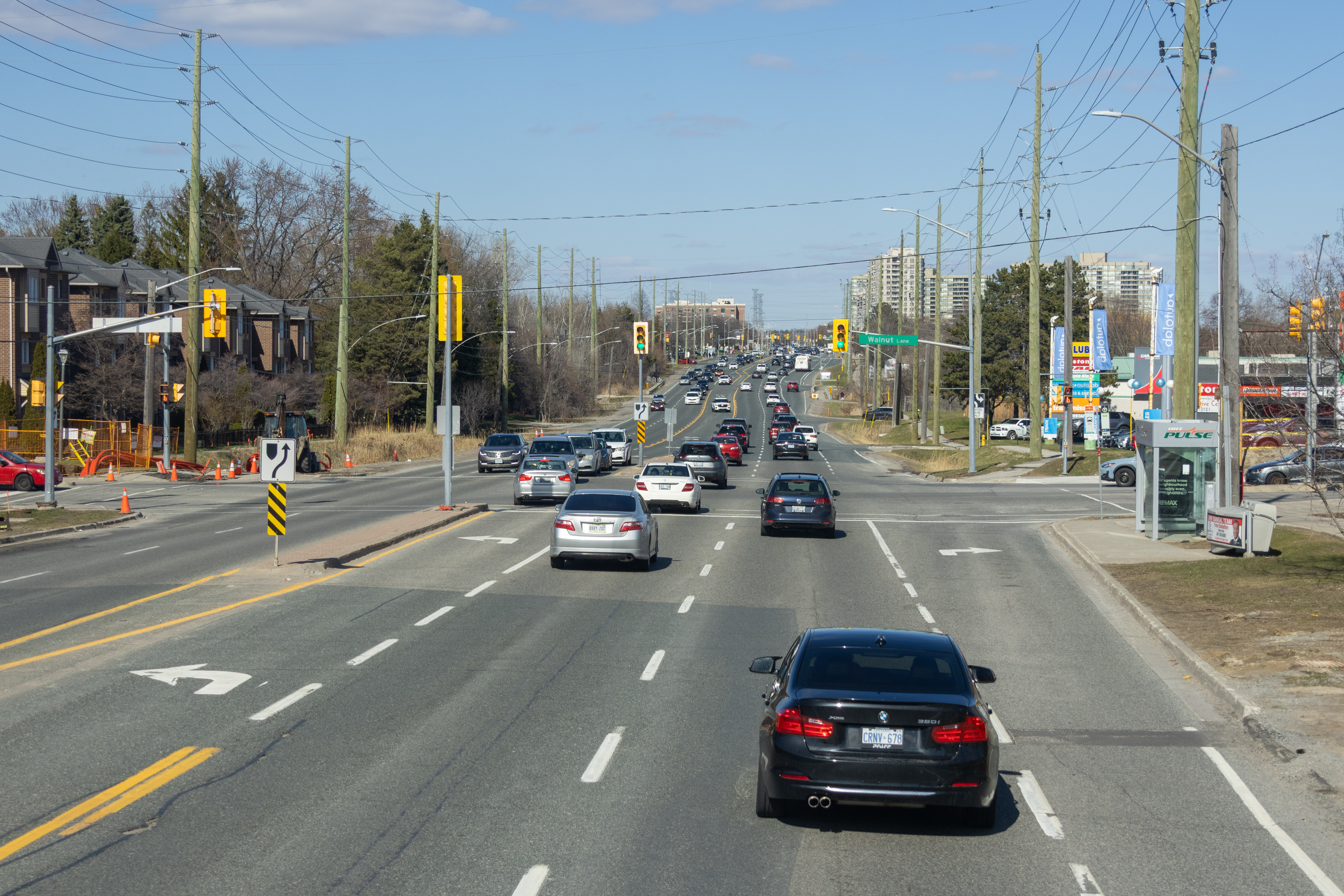
Kingston Road in Pickering where part of the BRT corridor is to be constructed

The 7.5-kilometre (4.7 mi) section along Kingston Road within Pickering would have reserved median bus lanes, 20 bus stops with shelters and bicycle lanes. In August 2021, the governments of Canada, Ontario and Durham Region reached a funding agreement to build this portion of the DSBRT within Pickering. The estimated cost was $114.4 million.

=== Ajax ===
Ajax has a pinch point along Kingston Road between Elizabeth Street and Rotherglen Road within its Pickering Village district. The street is four lanes wide, and buildings are close to the property line. At this pinch point, Metrolinx prefers to convert the curb lanes to dedicated bus lanes with bus stop shelters along the sidewalk. Outside the pinch point, Metrolinx proposes a six-lane road including two centre-median lanes dedicated for buses.

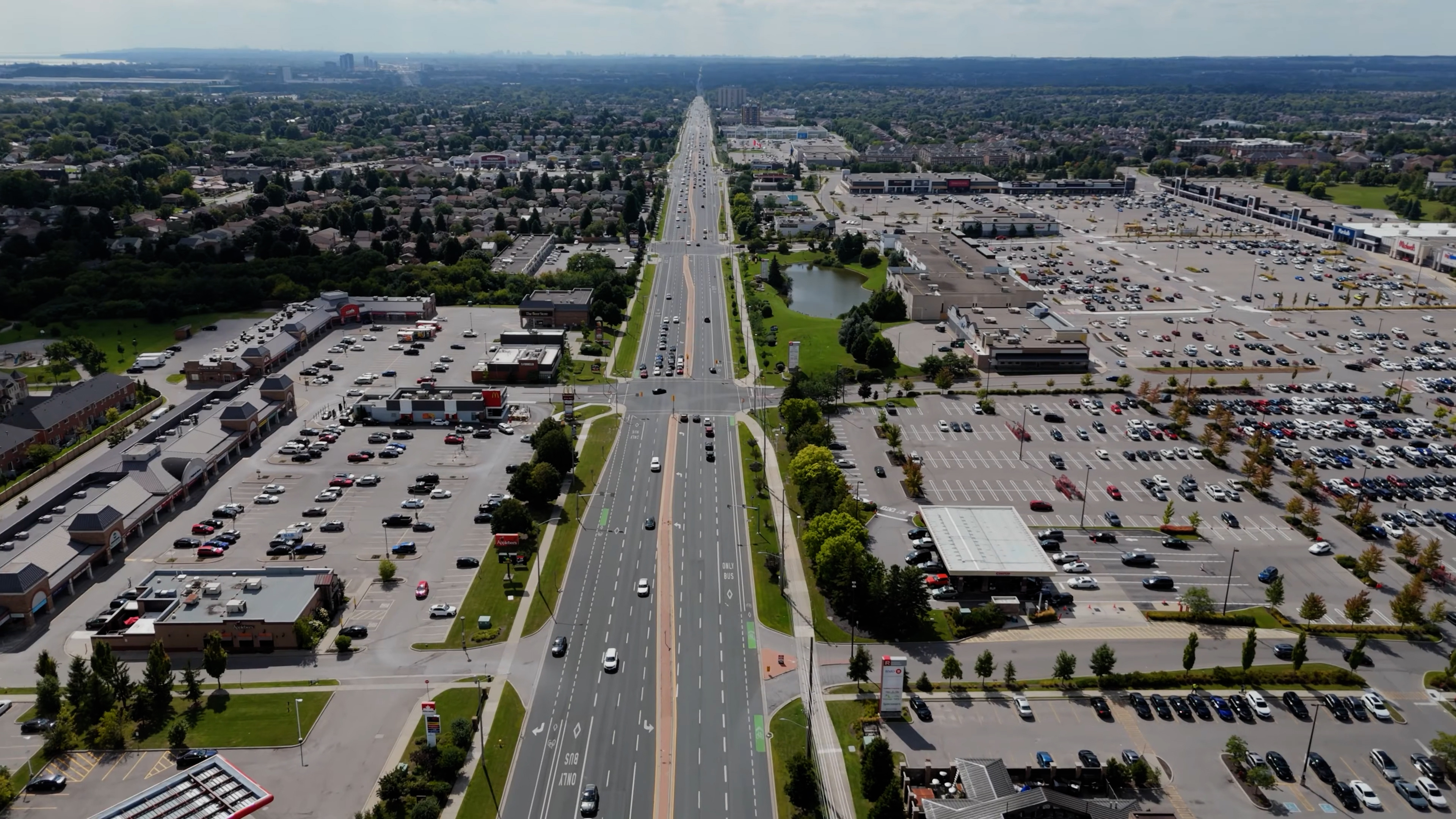
Aerial view of Kingston Road near Salem Road in Ajax where part of the BRT corridor is to be constructed

In 2021, Durham Region along with the provincial and federal governments have pledged $58.7 million to build sections of the BRT in Ajax, Whitby and Oshawa.

=== Whitby ===
Dundas Street (Highway 2 beyond Kingston Road's eastern terminus) within downtown Whitby between Frances Street and Garden Street is a four-lane street of which two lanes are used for on-street parking. The sidewalks are narrow and buildings are located close to the property line. Originally, Metrolinx preferred to convert both curb-side lanes from parking to dedicated BRT lanes.

As of May 2021, a revised plan within downtown Whitby called for a three-lane design along Dundas Street between Perry Street and Byron Street. The design included three lanes of traffic: one eastbound lane for cars, one dedicated eastbound lane for buses and one westbound shared lane for both cars and buses. There would also be space for on-street parking on one side of the street. Otherwise, outside of the downtown area, Dundas Street would be widened to provide separate bus lanes between Lakeridge Road and Thornton Road (Oshawa).

=== Oshawa ===
Within Oshawa, the DSBRT plan (as of May 2021) would have six stops running along King Street (eastbound Highway 2) and Bond Street (westbound Highway 2), from Simcoe Street in downtown Oshawa, west to the city limits with Whitby. King Street and Bond Street are a one-way street pairing each having three lanes. On both streets, one traffic lane would be converted into a reserved curbside bus lane between Waverly Street and Simcoe Street. West of Waverly Street, King Street would be widened to accommodate two bus-only centre-median transit lanes without reducing the number of lanes for general traffic. Along the centre-median section, transit stops would be located at signaled intersections and have raised and barrier-protected platforms.

Trent University Durham GTA would be a source of ridership for the DSBRT.

== History ==
On June 15, 2007, Ontario premier Dalton McGuinty announced a $16 billion transit plan called MoveOntario 2020. One component of the plan was a bus rapid transit line on Highway 2 between Pickering and Oshawa.

About 2010, Durham Region was considering light rail transit to replace the Highway 2 BRT all the way east to Courtice Road in Clarington and west into Scarborough in Toronto. It would have been complemented by two further LRT lines: on Simcoe Street in Oshawa (from Bloor to Highway 407) and on Taunton Road (from Simcoe Street in Oshawa to Whites Road in Pickering). This would have been augmented by further BRT on Whites Road and Brock Road in Pickering; Harwood Avenue and Salem Road in Ajax; Brock Street and Baldwin Street in Whitby; Highway 7 from the western Pickering border to Simcoe Street in Oshawa; and Taunton Road westerly beyond Whites Road into Toronto on Steeles Avenue. By 2015, Durham Region had installed reserved bus and bicycle lanes on Kingston Road (Highway 2) between Harwood Avenue and Salem Road in Ajax. These curb-side lanes were delineated by painted markings on the road surface and diamond signs over the lanes.

In 2021, Metrolinx proposed the Durham–Scarborough BRT along Highway 2. However, Metrolinx indicated that the BRT could be easily converted to LRT in the future if required.

== See also ==
- Dundas Street bus rapid transit
