= Scarborough City Centre =

- Neighbourhood
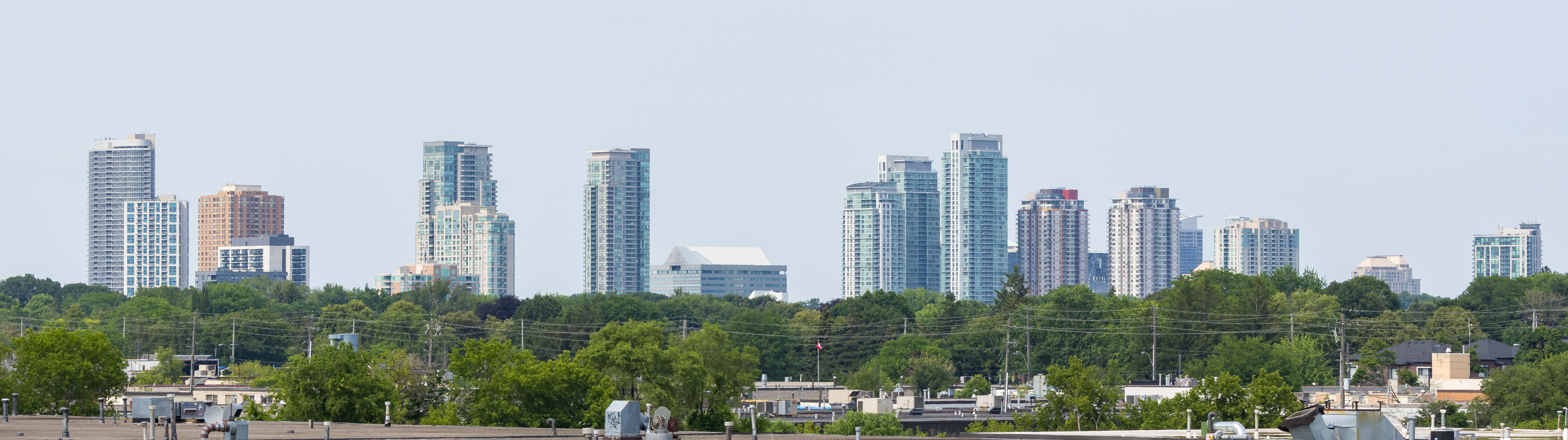
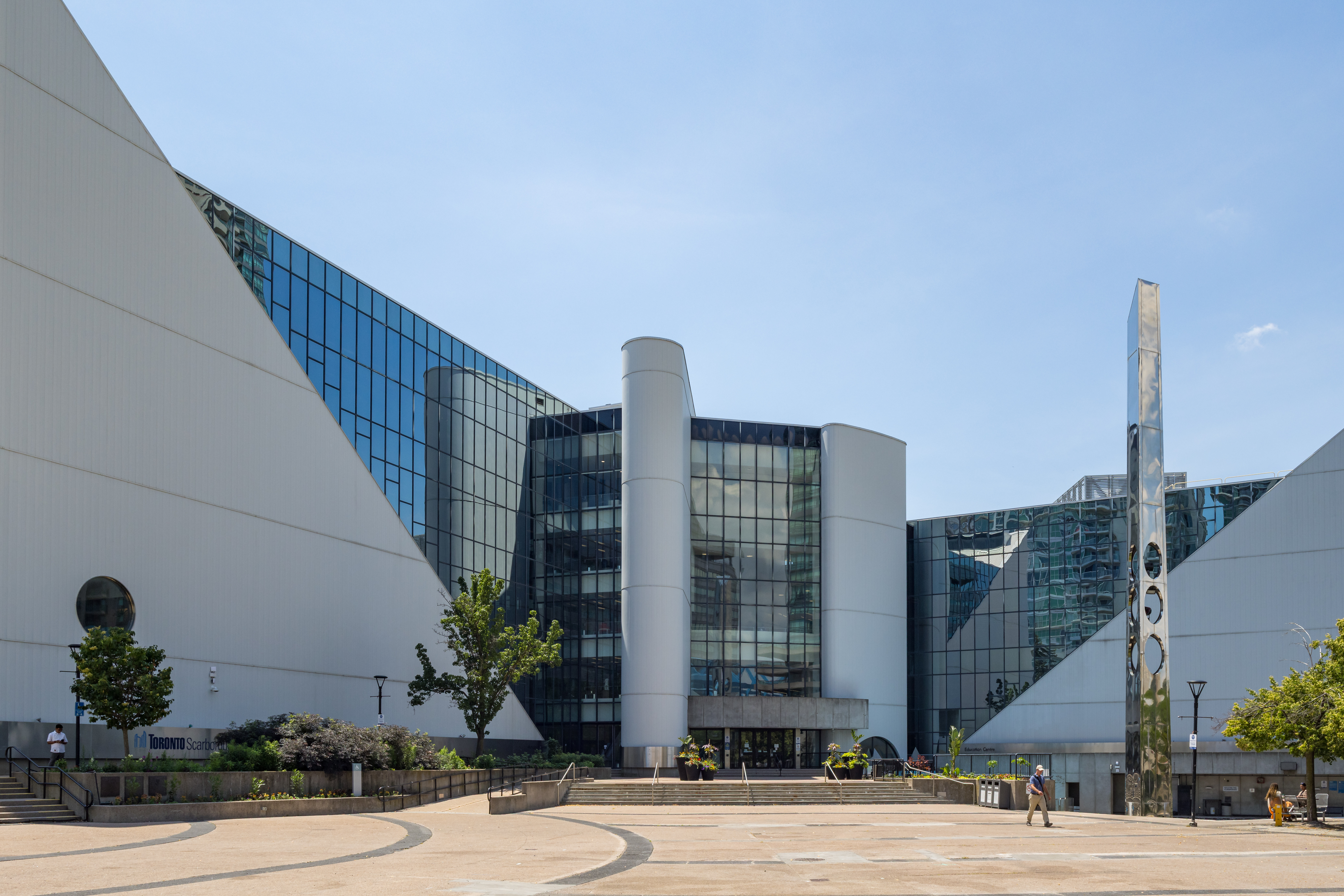
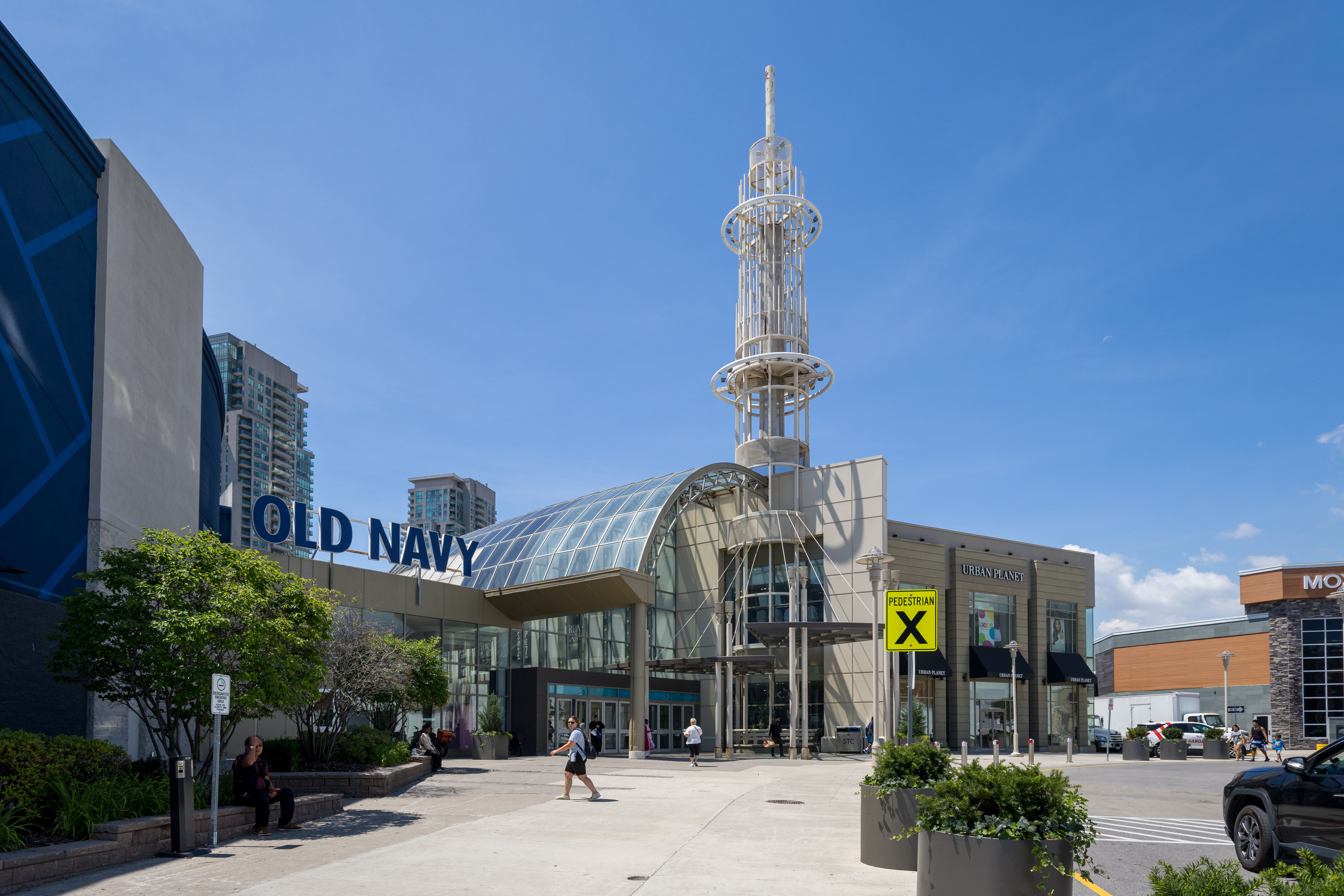
- Scarborough City Centre skyline in 2026 Scarborough Civic Centre Scarborough Town Centre

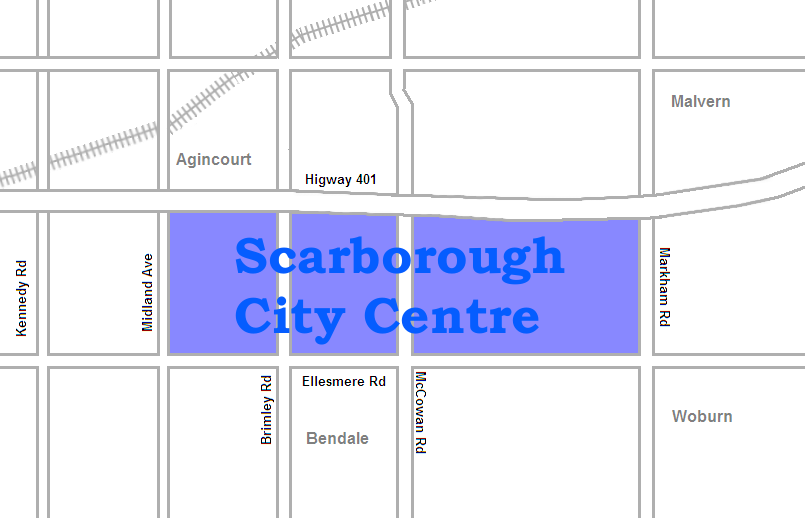
- Coordinates: 43°46′22″N 79°15′27″W
- Country: Canada
- Province: Ontario
- City: Toronto
- Changed Municipality: 1998 Toronto from Scarborough

Government
  - MP: Salma Zahid (Scarborough Centre)
  - MPP: David Smith (Scarborough Centre)
  - Councillor: Michael Thompson (Ward 21 Scarborough Centre)

Scarborough City Centre is a commercial district in Toronto, Ontario, Canada. It was the central business district for the former city of Scarborough, which amalgamated with Toronto in 1998. Scarborough City Centre remains one of the central business districts outside Downtown Toronto.

== Character ==
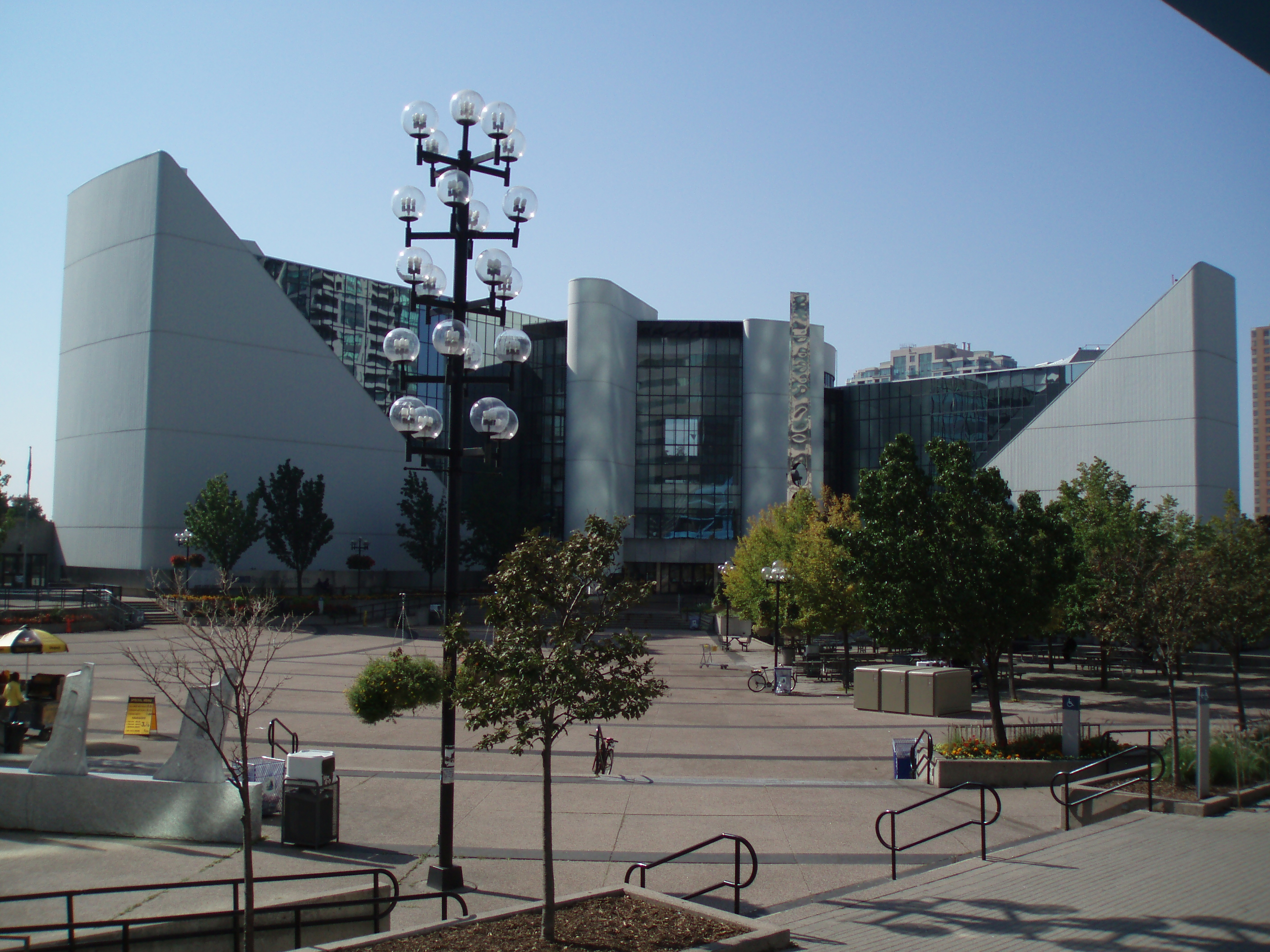
Scarborough Civic Centre and Albert Campbell Square are located at the centre of Scarborough City Centre.

It is roughly bounded by Kennedy Road and Dorset Park to the west, Markham Road and Woburn to the east, Ellesmere Road and Bendale to the south, and Ontario Highway 401/Agincourt to the north. At its centre core is the Scarborough Civic Centre, Albert Campbell Square, Scarborough Town Centre shopping mall, and the Canada Centre Building.

Condominium high-rises surround these central buildings and public spaces, forming the skyline of the neighbourhood. The major office towers in the area include those situated at Consilium Place, which was completed in 1991. In a band around the southern side of the city centre are densely forested parklands, between Borough Drive and Ellesmere Road. The areas outside the immediate city centre is primarily made up of industrial parks, and low-density housing.

== History ==
Prior to the 1940s, the area was primarily agricultural, with the closest communities being Agincourt and Malvern. Early farms in the area included the farm of George and Lena Bick, who founded the Bick's Pickle brand from pickles grown and processed on their farm. Although the farm was eventually converted to residential and industrial land, the production facility continued to operate on Progress Avenue until 2001.

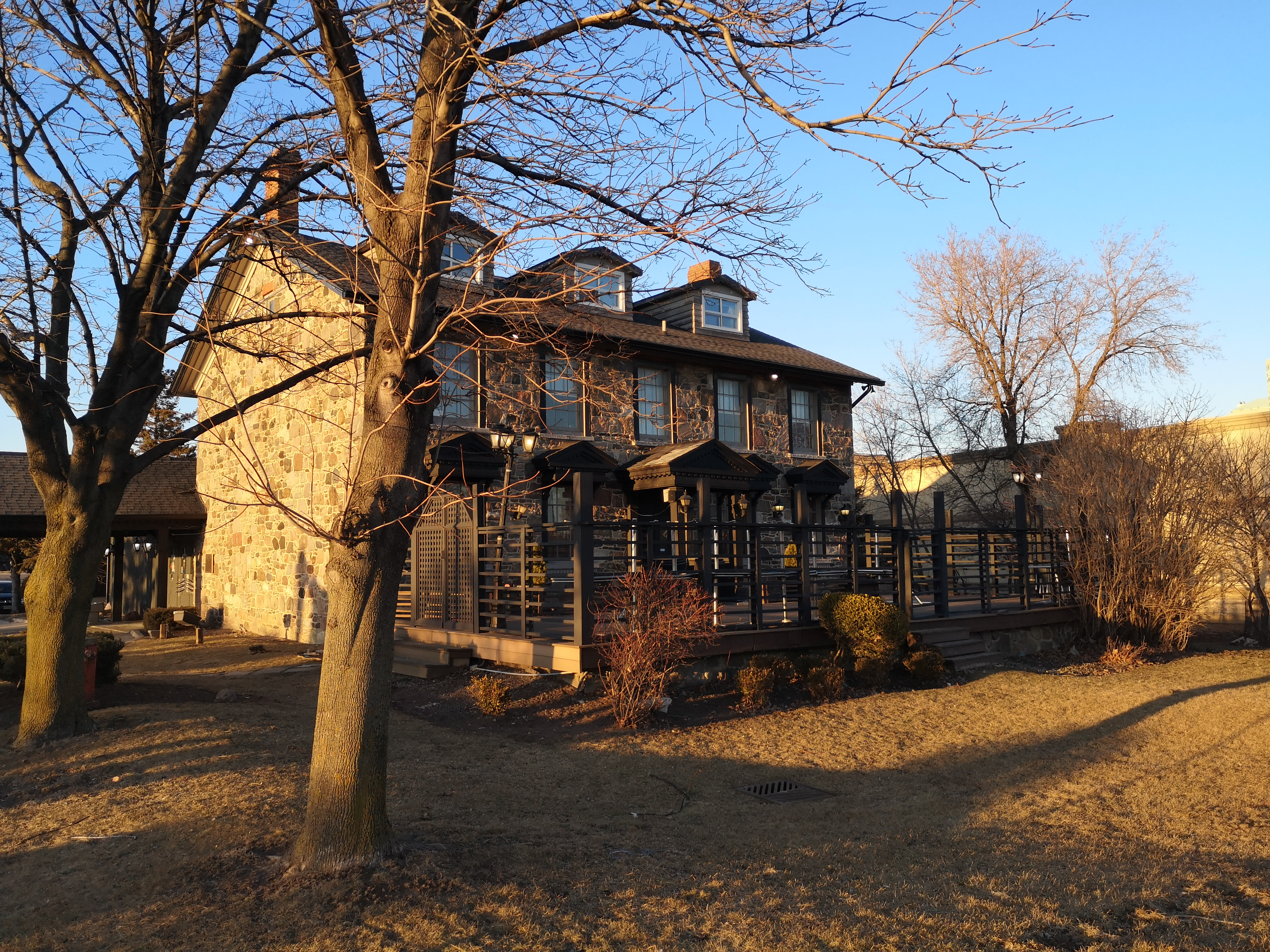
Built in 1841, Scott House was a former residence located in Scarborough City Centre. The building was later converted into a restaurant.

Development in the area had first come in the 1950s when Ontario Highway 401 was built through the area. One early development was the TV studios of CFTO-TV at the intersection of the 401 and McCowan Road, known as 9 Channel Nine Court. Scarborough became part of Metropolitan Toronto in 1954 when "Metro" was carved out of York County. As part of the metropolitan government’s planning policy, plans were put forth to develop the city centres of municipalities surrounding the City of Toronto, which originated as rural townships rather than distinct urban settlements. Scarborough Civic Centre, which was built to house offices of Scarborough's municipal government, and Metropolitan Toronto, and the Scarborough Town Centre were built in the 1970s. The Toronto Transit Commission's Scarborough RT line was completed in 1985.

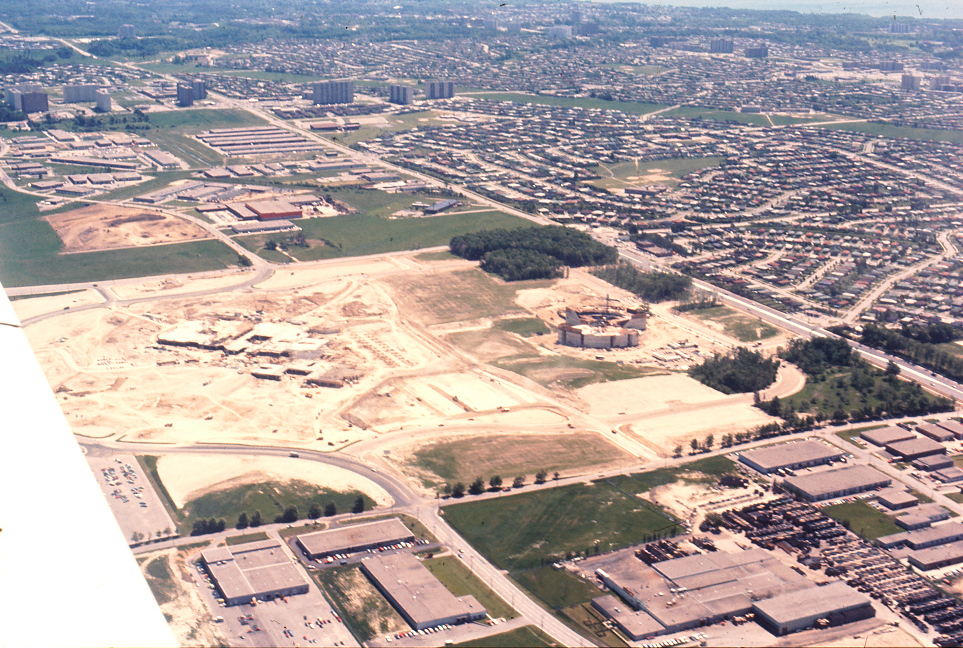
Aerial view of Scarborough City Centre in 1972, showing the construction of the Scarborough Town Centre and Civic Centre.

The beginning of the 21st century saw the development of several condominium high-rises and office complexes in the area.

The area was formerly represented as Ward 38 Scarborough Centre, in the 44 Ward city council model. However in 2018, a 25 Ward model was adopted, resulting in Wards 38 and 37 merging to create Ward 21 Scarborough Centre.

In December 2018, plans by Oxford Properties and AECOM were unveiled, proposing massive changes to the City Centre area. Specifically between McCowan Road, Brimley Road and the 401. The proposal includes the realignment of Progress Avenue around the Scarborough Town Centre, the introduction of 36 new residential buildings to the area, and brand new park spaces.

== Transportation ==
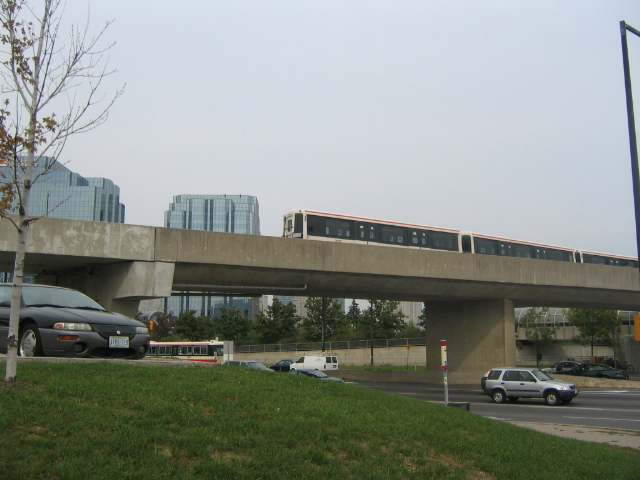
A train from Line 3 Scarborough between McCowan station and Scarborough Centre station (circa 2005).

The neighbourhood is connected to public transit services at operated by the Toronto Transit Commission (TTC). Scarborough Centre station is the primary station of the city centre, used by the TTC bus system, and formerly Line 3 Scarborough trains. In addition to Scarborough Centre station, two other stations from Line 3 Scarborough were situated in Scarborough Centre. Midland station was a station west of Scarborough Centre, situated along the centre's western boundary, while McCowan station was situated east of Scarborough Centre station, and acted as the line's terminus. Line 3 was demolished and in its place, Line 2 Bloor-Danforth will be extended, relocating Scarborough Centre station by 2029–30. Once extended, Line 2 will provide a one-seat ride to Downtown Toronto from Scarborough City Centre. The Scarborough busway was opened on the former Line 3 right of way in 2026.

In addition to municipal transit, the Scarborough Centre Bus Terminal is a commuter bus service operated by GO Transit bus services. In addition to GO Transit, the terminal is also used by several inter-city coach services. The Scarborough Centre station and the Scarborough Centre Bus Terminal are situated adjacent to one another, next to the Scarborough Town Centre and Scarborough Civic Centre.

The neighbourhood is bounded by Ontario Highway 401, a major east-west controlled access highway that bisects the City of Toronto.

== See also ==
- List of neighbourhoods in Toronto
