= Consilium (disambiguation) =

Consilium may refer to:

- Consilia, a literary genre
- Consilium de Emendanda Ecclesia, a 1536 report commissioned by Pope Paul III on the abuses in the Catholic Church
- Consilium Place, an office complex in the Scarborough district of Toronto, Canada
- Consilium ad exsequendam Constitutionem de Sacra Liturgia, a commission entrusted with the reform of the liturgy, including the Mass of Paul VI
- Council of the European Union, or Consilium, institution in bicameral legislature of the European Union
- Aulic Council or Consilium Aulicum, of the Holy Roman Empire
- Sacrosanctum Concilium, a conciliar constitution, after the Second Vatican Council

== See also ==
- Concilium (disambiguation)
