= McCowan District Park =

Municipal park in Toronto, Canada

Coordinates: 43.73377°N 79.23755°W

McCowan District Park is a 8.1-hectare (20-acre) recreational park in the Eglinton East neighbourhood of Scarborough, Toronto, Ontario, Canada. The park is located along McCowan Road, south of the Lakeshore East commuter rail line of GO Transit.

== Development ==
The park is set upon brownfield land, previously used by the former City of Scarborough as public works yard. In 2004, the Toronto Parks, Forestry and Recreation Division published a two-phase plan to redevelop the land into a park. The first phase opened in 2006 with urban open space, trails, a multi-use sports field, and a playground. The second phase began construction in 2014 and completed in 2017 which includes an outdoor ice rink and recreation buildings. The outdoor ice rink is the second such rink in Scarborough since 1973, after Albert Campbell Square.

== Safety ==
Regular visitors of the park have requested a pedestrian crossing at the park's McCowan Road entrance at Bridlegrove Drive after a fatal motor vehicle collision occurred in 2007.
