= Canada Centre Building =

Canadian federal office building in Scarborough, Toronto

Coordinates: 43°46′28″N 79°15′24″W

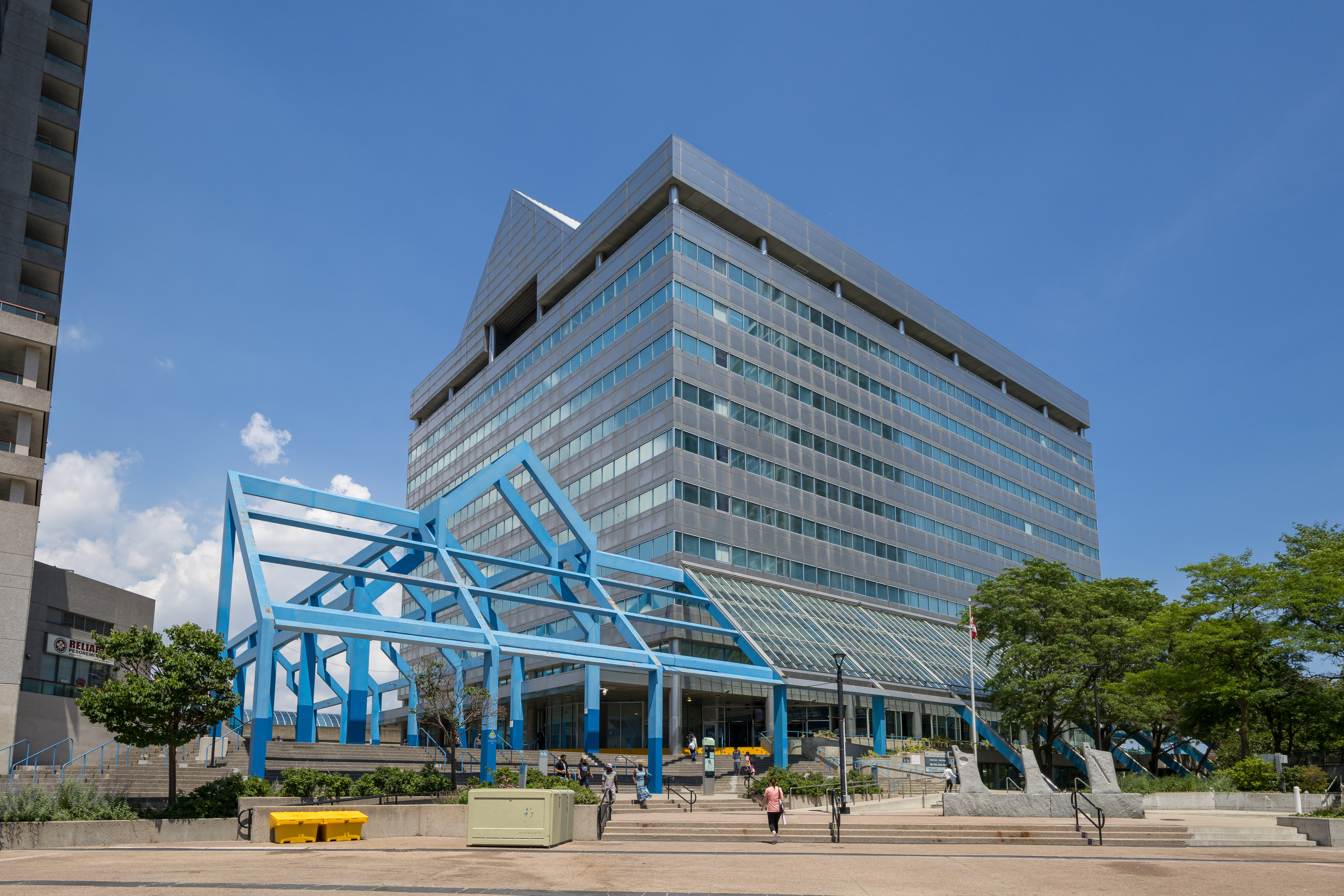
The Canada Centre Building in 2026

The Canada Centre Building (Note: Officially known as the Government of Canada Building (GOCB) at 200 Town Centre Court, it is referred to as the Canada Centre Building in common usage.) is a 12-storey postmodern federal government office building in the Scarborough district of Toronto. It is located at 200 Town Centre Court, between the Scarborough Civic Centre and Scarborough Town Centre shopping mall, and next to Scarborough Centre station. (Note: Scarborough Centre station is a bus terminal which had light-rail transit until 2023.) The building houses offices of Service Canada, Employment and Social Development Canada, Passport Canada, Forensics Canada and the Canada Revenue Agency, providing services for Scarborough and Central Ontario. Opened in 1985, the building is most notable for its energy-conservation systems, which include one of the first successful full-scale applications of aquifer thermal energy storage (ATES).

The building was designed by architects Moriyama and Teshima (Note: Moriyama and Teshima also designed the Scarborough Civic Centre and other iconic Toronto architecture.) with a postmodern influence reflective of the surrounding public buildings. (Note: There is a strong consistency of design among the Town Centre buildings constructed during the 1970s and 1980s, when the official plan for development included height, orientation and design of buildings for a "strong, consistent, identifiable image" and a "recognizable skyline for the Town Centre".) It is situated at the western side of a 2.2-hectare (5.4-acre) rectangular property and is twelve stories tall, with the lower two levels reserved for parking. The building provides 30,000 square metres (320,000 sq ft) of office space to accommodate 1,900 office workers. Its distinctive roofline is replicated in a blue-framed galleria structure which provides a pedestrian walkway between Scarborough Centre station and Albert Campbell Square.

The building was constructed during 1983–1985. While excavating and drilling for the foundations in 1980–81, two potential aquifers were found, allowing an ATES system to be integrated into the design. The system uses four 60-metre-deep (200 ft) production wells supplying 10–30 L/s (0.35–1.06 cu ft/s) of groundwater, with an additional fifteen observation wells on the property. It was set up as a full-scale research facility with $200,000 of scientific instrumentation to monitor its operations, which began in 1985.

In addition to the ATES, the building's heating and cooling systems include 700 square metres (7,500 sq ft) of roof-mounted solar heat collectors, forced-draft cooling towers, centrifugal chillers, plate heat exchangers, electric boilers, and concrete storage tanks. A large computing facility was added in 1986–87 to control and monitor these systems, selecting the most efficient usage. In 1989, the chillers were converted to heat pumps to meet cooling demand due to increased occupancy. Following this conversion, annual energy purchases were about 250 kWh per square metre or 5000 kWh per workplace.

Engineering firm H. H. Angus and Associates received a 1986 Award of Excellence (mechanical) from Canadian Consulting Engineer magazine for their contributions to the design and implementation of the Canada Centre's energy systems. A 2021 study identified the Canada Centre Building for heritage consideration due to its design and association in the context of the growth of the Scarborough Civic Centre location.
