= Concilium =

Concilium is a Latin word that means "a council, a meeting." It may also refer to:

- Concilium (journal), a worldwide journal of Catholic theology
- Concilium Germanicum (c. 742), the first major Church synod to be held in the eastern parts of the Frankish kingdoms
- Concilium Plebis, the principal popular assembly of the ancient Roman Republic
- Magnum Concilium (Great Council), an assembly established in the reign of the Normans
- Sacrosanctum Concilium (Constitution on the Sacred Liturgy), one of the constitutions of the Second Vatican Council

== See also ==
- Consilium (disambiguation)
