= Scarborough Centre station =

Toronto bus station

Scarborough Centre
- The station's bus bay in 2026

General information
- Location: 290 Borough Drive, Toronto, Ontario; Canada
- Coordinates: 43°46′28″N 79°15′28″W
- Platforms: Side platforms
- Tracks: 2 (Line 3)
- Bus routes: TTC buses: 9 Bellamy; 16 McCowan; 21 Brimley; 38 Highland Creek; 43B Kennedy; 129 McCowan North; 130 Middlefield; 131 Nugget; 132 Milner; 133 Neilson; 134 Progress; 169 Huntingwood; 406 Scarborough-Guildwood community bus; 903 Kennedy Station – Scarborough Express; 904 Sheppard Kennedy Express; 938 Highland Creek Express; 939AB Finch Express; 996 Wilson Express
- Bus operators: Toronto Transit Commission; Durham Region Transit
- Connections: Scarborough Centre Bus Terminal

Construction
- Structure type: Elevated
- Accessible: yes

Other information
- Website: Official station page

History
- Opened: March 22, 1985; 41 years ago
- Closed: July 24, 2023; 3 years ago (Line 3)

Passengers
- 2019: 24,399
- Rank: 39 of 75 (2019)
Former services
Preceding station	Toronto Transit Commission	Following station
Midland towards Kennedy	Line 3 Scarborough	McCowan Terminus
Location

Scarborough Centre is a bus terminal station in Toronto, Ontario, Canada, serving multiple bus routes of the Toronto Transit Commission (TTC) and one Durham Region Transit (DRT) bus route. It was also a rapid transit station serving Line 3 Scarborough of the Toronto subway system until Line 3's closure on July 24, 2023. It is located north of Ellesmere Road between Brimley and McCowan Roads, just south of Highway 401. It was adjacent to the former Scarborough Centre Bus Terminal, which was a station for GO Transit buses and other intercity coach services until the TTC modified the facility for TTC buses.

A new Scarborough Centre station is planned to be built along the Line 2 extension east of the existing station, which is set to open circa 2030.

== History ==
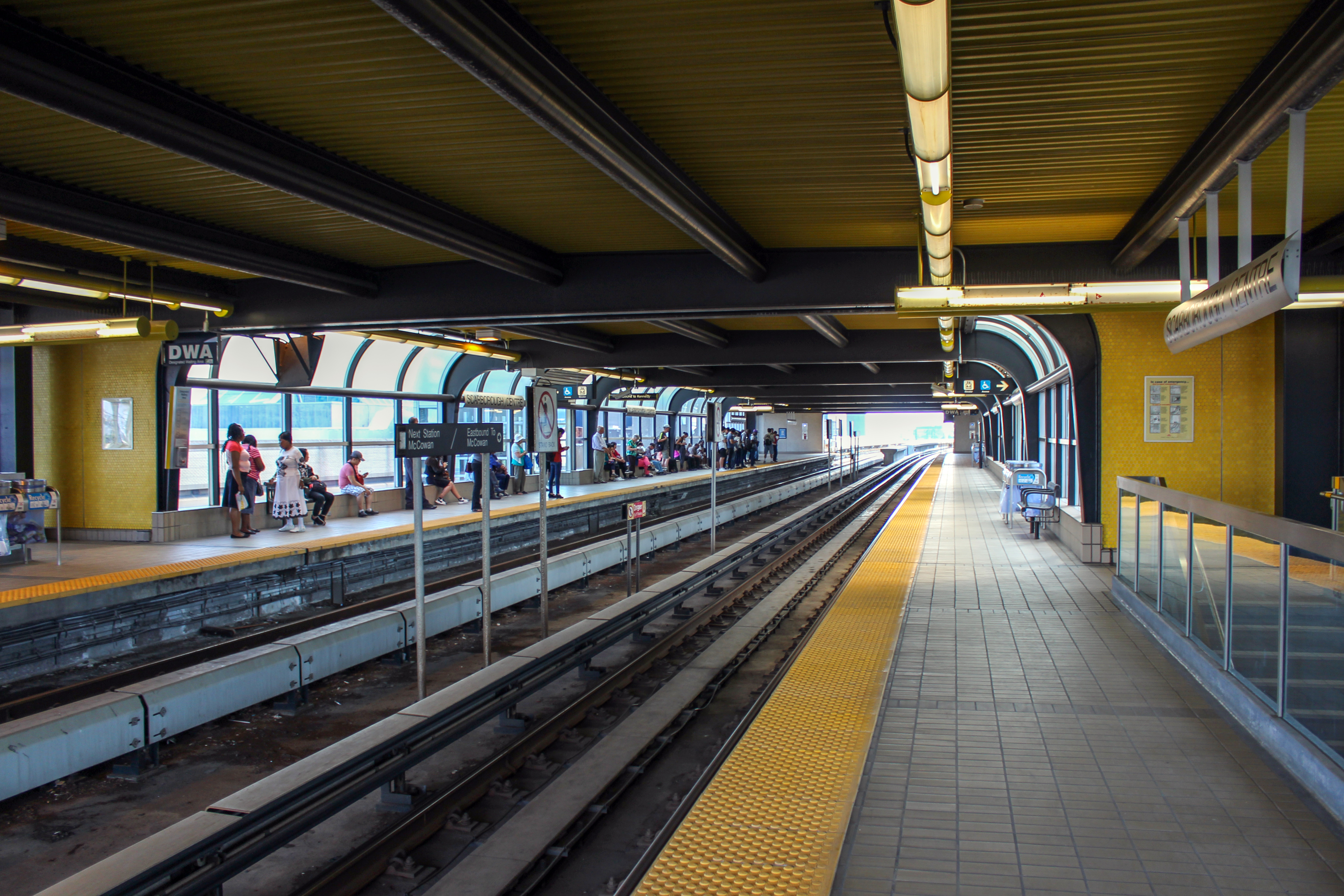
The former Line 3 platform in 2018

Scarborough Centre station was opened in 1985 along with the rest of Line 3. The station replaced transit access to the Scarborough Town Centre shopping mall's south side (at ground level along roadway).

In 2000, this station became accessible with elevators.

The Toronto Transit Commission had planned to extend Line 4 Sheppard southeast from its current terminus at Don Mills to Scarborough Centre. The 904 Sheppard–Kennedy Express bus currently links the two stations, making limited stops along Sheppard Avenue. In March 2007, however, the TTC dropped this plan when it announced its Transit City proposal to build the Sheppard East LRT. The LRT proposal was later replaced by a plan to extend Line 4 eastwards from Don Mills station to McCowan Road.

Around 2011, there was a proposal to convert Line 3 to light-rail with an extension of the Eglinton Crosstown line (Line 5 Eglinton) over the Line 3 right-of-way.

In 2013, the proposal was changed to abandon the Line 3 right-of-way and build an underground extension of Line 2 Bloor–Danforth along McCowan Road. This would result in the decommissioning of all Line 3 stations beyond Kennedy station. A new Scarborough Centre station would be built east of the current station and would be oriented on a north–south alignment rather than the east–west alignment of the current station. Between 2013 and 2016, the new Scarborough Centre station was planned as a through-station. In order to save money for another transit project, the plan was revised in 2016 to make it a terminal station. However, in 2019 the plan was revised again to make the new Scarborough Centre station a through-station.

In February 2021, the TTC recommended the closure of Line 3 in November 2023 and its replacement by bus service until the completion of the Scarborough extension of Line 2 Bloor–Danforth. However, the rail portion of this station permanently closed following a derailment on July 24, 2023, after which the TTC decided not to reopen Line 3.

== Station description ==
=== Existing station ===
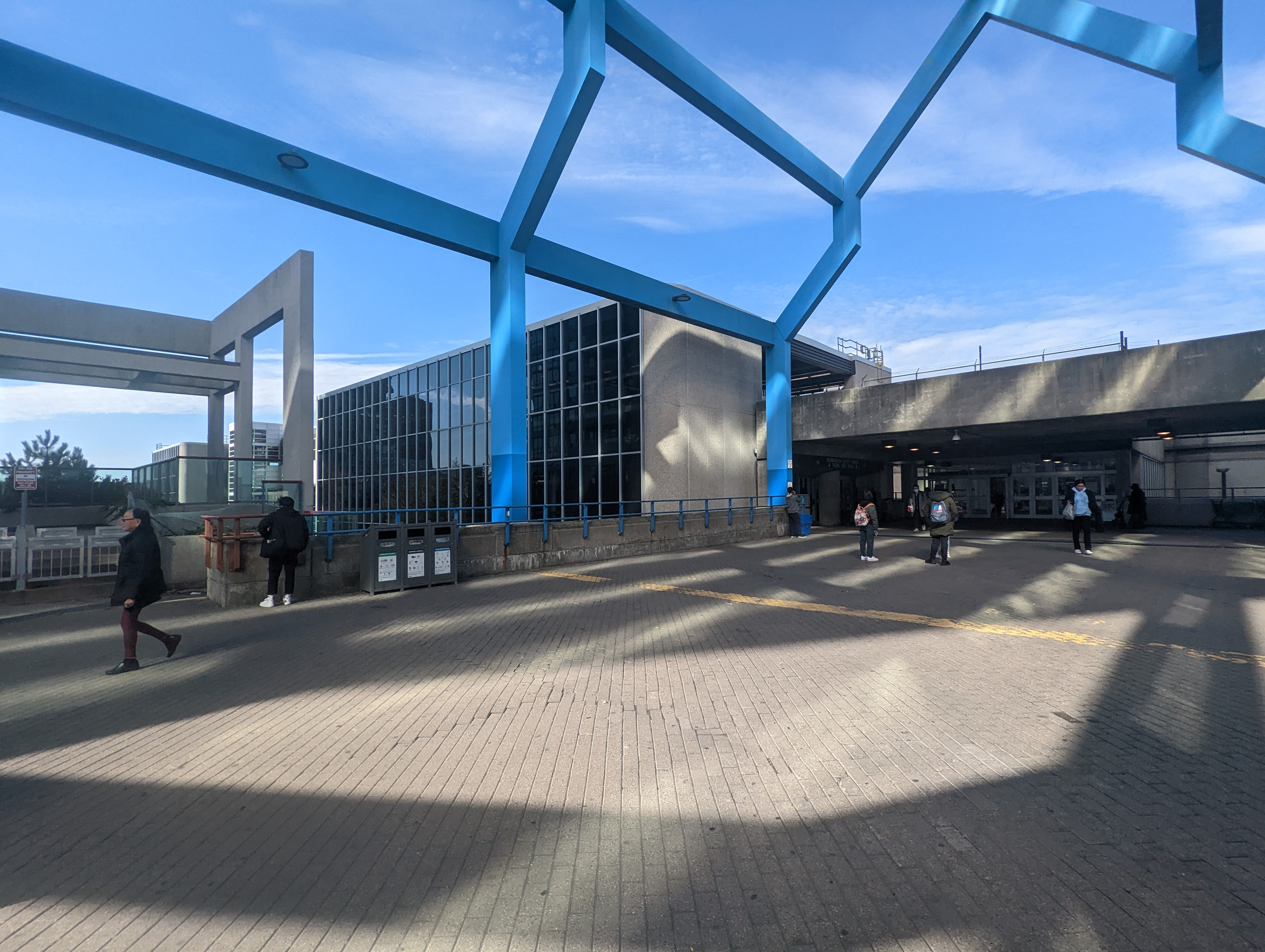
Station entrance

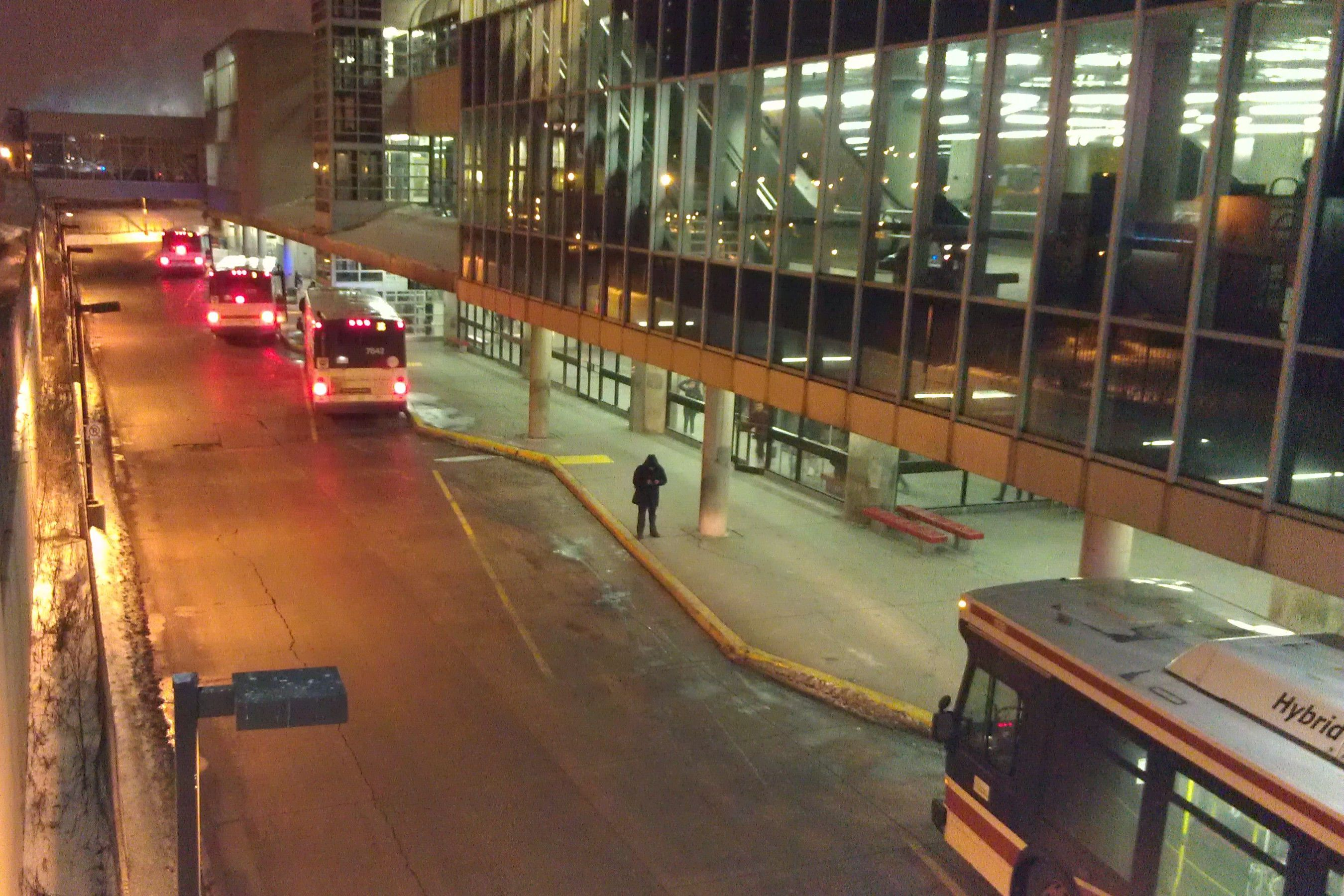
Bus bays with the concourse and train platform levels above

The existing station is located north of Ellesmere Road, between Brimley and McCowan Roads on the south of the Scarborough Town Centre. The station was built on three levels: Line 3 used to operate through the upper level; the mezzanine, passenger entry from the mall, and an automatic entrance from Brian Harrison Way are on the middle level; and two bus terminals were located at ground level, one for TTC buses connected by an automatic entrance to the Scarborough Centre Bus Terminal for intercity buses. (In October 2022, the intercity terminal was relocated so that the TTC bus terminal could expand into its space.) There is elevator access for TTC services, making this station fully accessible to anyone with disabilities.

East of the current station, the Line 3 continued travelling east on an elevated bridge until McCowan station. West of the station, the Line 3 ran on an elevated bridge which descended after passing over Brimley Road. It continued to descend until reaching Midland station.

The TTC permanently closed the Line 3 portion of the existing station after a derailment on July 24, 2023; however, the adjacent bus facilities will be kept in operation until 2030 with its bus bays reconfigured.

=== Future replacement station ===
The provincial transit agency Metrolinx is building a new underground Scarborough Centre station parallel to McCowan Road along an extension of Line 2 Bloor–Danforth. The new station will be on a north–south alignment to the east of Scarborough Town Centre. The new station will have a new Scarborough Centre Bus Terminal serving TTC and GO Transit buses as well as the Durham Region Transit bus rapid transit line. The new station will be located 500 metres (1,600 ft) east of the former station, on the east side of McCowan Road north of the Line 3 right-of-way next to the site of McCowan station. The new station and bus terminal are expected to open in 2030.

== Nearby landmarks ==
Located in Scarborough City Centre, nearby landmarks include the Scarborough Town Centre shopping mall, Scarborough Civic Centre, Albert Campbell Square, Canada Centre government offices, and Scarborough YMCA.

== Surface connections ==
=== Toronto Transit Commission Bus Terminal ===
Bus routes serving the bus terminal include:

Bay number	Route	Name	Additional information
1	920 (DRT)		Eastbound to Harmony Terminal
2	134B	Progress	Northbound to McNicoll Avenue via Tapscott Road (Rush hour service)
2	134D	Progress	Northbound to Finch Avenue East via Centennial College and Tapscott Road
2	134D	Progress	Northbound to Finch Avenue East via Centennial College and Crow Trail
2	903A	Kennedy Station–Scarborough Express	Eastbound to Centennial College
3	131	Nugget	Eastbound to Old Finch Avenue and Morningview Trail
4	939A	Finch Express	Westbound to Finch station
4	939B	Finch Express	Westbound to Finch West station via Finch station
5	129A	McCowan North	Northbound to Major Mackenzie Drive
5	129B	McCowan North	Northbound to Steeles Avenue East
6	904	Sheppard–Kennedy Express	Westbound to Don Mills station
7	133	Neilson	Northbound to Morningside Heights via Centenary Hospital
8	38A	Highland Creek	Eastbound to Rouge Hill GO Station
8	38B	Highland Creek	Eastbound to University of Toronto Scarborough
8	938	Highland Creek Express	Eastbound to University of Toronto Scarborough (AM rush hour service)
9 - 13	38	Highland Creek	Southbound to Kennedy station via Midland Avenue (Line 3 express bus replacement service)
9 - 13	129	McCowan North	Southbound to Kennedy station via Midland Avenue (Line 3 express bus replacement service)
9 - 13	131	Nugget	Southbound to Kennedy station via Midland Avenue (Line 3 express bus replacement service)
9 - 13	133	Neilson	Southbound to Kennedy station via Midland Avenue (Line 3 express bus replacement service)
9 - 13	903	Kennedy Station–Scarborough Express	Southbound to Kennedy station via Midland Avenue (Line 3 express bus replacement service)
9 - 13	904	Sheppard–Kennedy Express	Southbound to Kennedy station via Midland Avenue (Line 3 express bus replacement service)
9 - 13	938	Highland Creek Express	Southbound to Kennedy station via Midland Avenue (Line 3 express bus replacement service)
9 - 13	939	Finch Express	Southbound to Kennedy station via Midland Avenue (Line 3 express bus replacement service)
14	21C	Brimley	Southbound to Kennedy station
14	43B	Kennedy	Southbound to Kennedy station via Progress Avenue
15	9	Bellamy	Southbound to Warden station
15	130A	Middlefield	Northbound to Steeles Avenue East
15	130B	Middlefield	Northbound to Steeles Avenue East via Maybrook Drive (Rush hour service)
16	16	McCowan	Southbound to Warden station
16	406	Scarborough-Guildwood	Southbound to Guildwood GO station (Community bus)
16	Wheel-Trans		
17	996	Wilson Express	Westbound to Humberwood Boulevard via York Mills station and Wilson station and Humber College (Weekday service)
18	132	Milner	Northbound to McLevin Avenue and Hupfield Trail
18	169A	Huntingwood	Westbound to Don Mills station via Van Horne Avenue
18	169A	Huntingwood	Westbound to Don Mills station (Rush hour service)
19	21C	Brimley	Northbound to Steeles Avenue East

=== Other operators ===
==== GO Transit and intercity bus services ====
Scarborough Centre station was also home to the Scarborough Centre Bus Terminal, which was located directly east of the TTC bus platform. Until it closed, the former bus terminal was served by GO Transit and interurban buses, which now stop at various on-street locations near Scarborough Centre station.

==== Durham Region Transit ====
Since September 2023, Durham Region Transit (DRT) route 920 buses serve the TTC Scarborough Centre bus terminal. With the introduction of Ontario's One Fare Program, a GTHA-wide fare integration program introduced on February 26, 2024, customers paying by Presto, credit or debit card are able to transfer between TTC and DRT buses without incurring an additional fare during the 2-hour transfer window. As the station is located inside the TTC's fare-paid zone and as free card transfers need to be recorded for the province to reimburse participating transit agencies as well as to enforce double fares for customers ineligible for free transfers, passengers heading towards Durham Region board the DRT buses inside the TTC bus terminal, while those heading towards Scarborough Centre alight at nearby on-street stops outside of the station. The DRT buses previously terminated at McCowan station.
