= Consilium Place =

Office complex in Toronto, Ontario, Canada

Coordinates: 43.777547°N 79.251959°W

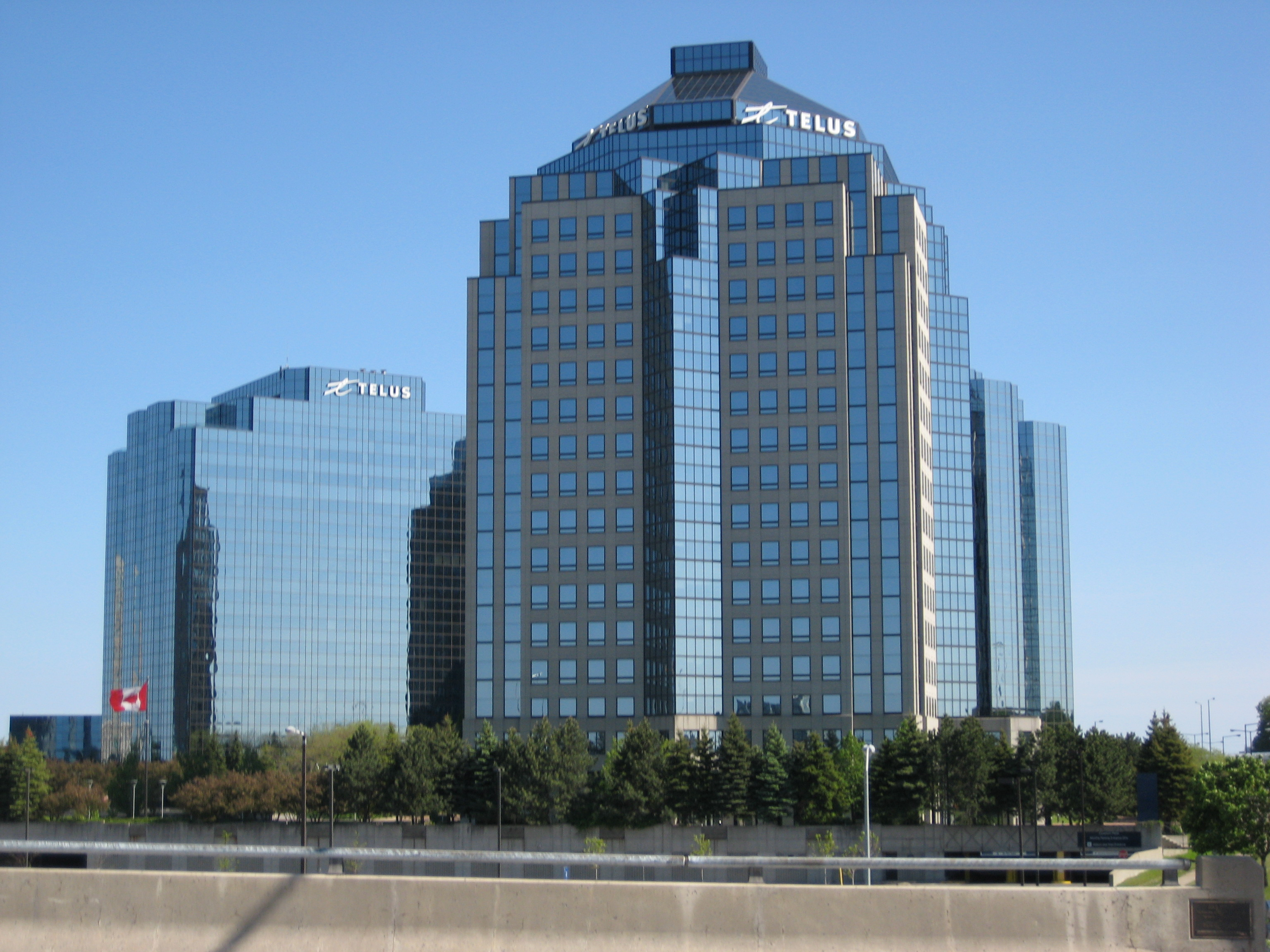
Consilium Place

Consulium Place is an office complex in Scarborough City Centre in Toronto.

- 17 storey 100 Consilium was built in 1984 - main tenant is Telus (former tenant was State Farm Insurance; they left in 2006)
- 17 storey 200 Consilium was built in 1985 - main tenant is Telus (original main tenant was Prudential Insurance 1985–1998)
- 18 storey 300 Consilium was built in 1989 - main tenant is Telus
- 19 storey Conard International Hotel was planned for 1980s, but was never completed.

All the buildings were designed by Bregman + Hamann Architects.

News reported that over 800 migratory birds collided into this building between 2008 and 2009, a phenomenon known as bird–skyscraper collisions.
