= Albert Campbell Square =

Square in Scarborough, Toronto, Canada

- Public square
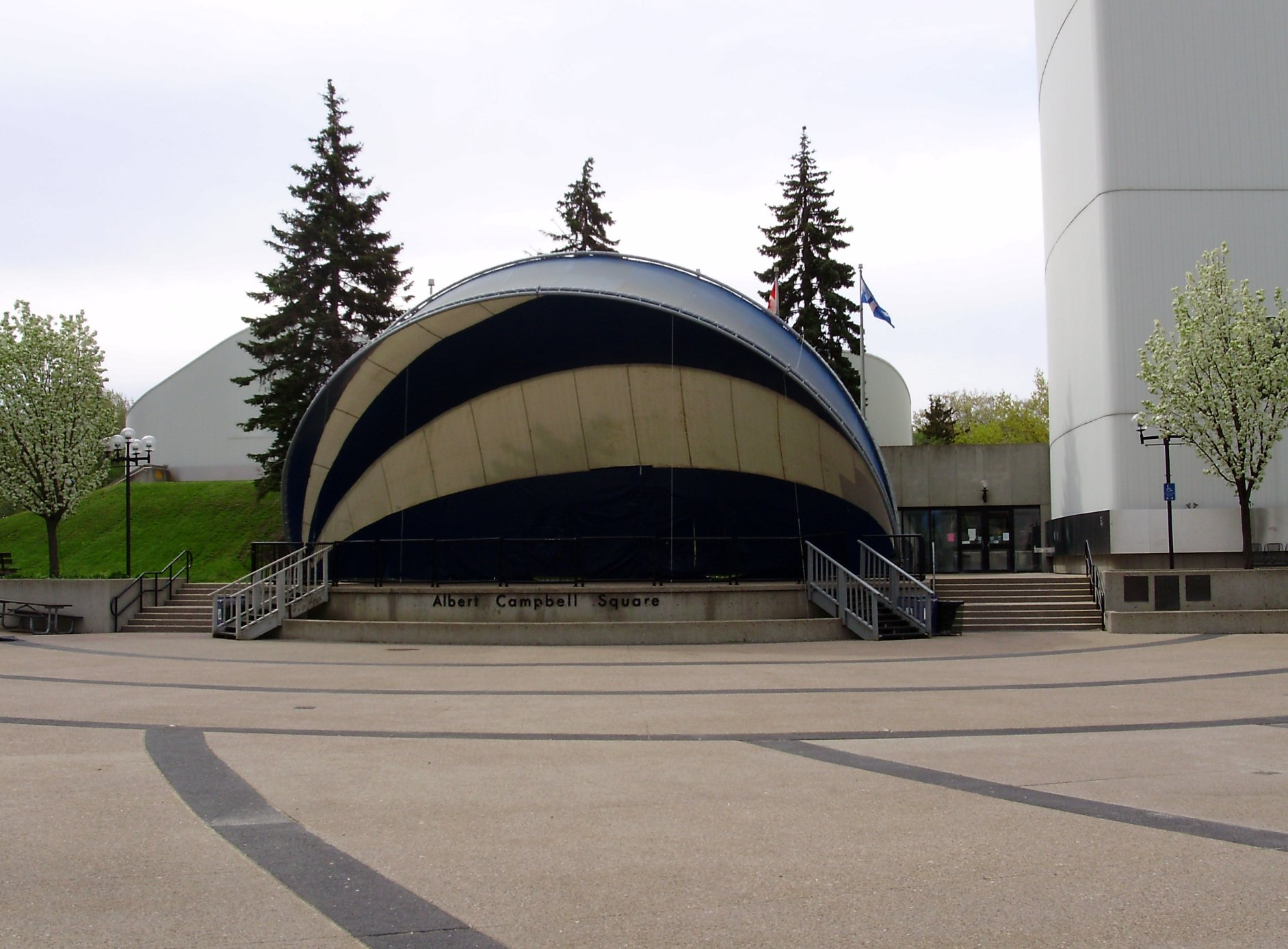
- Outdoor performance stage at Albert Campbell Square
- Features: Concert stage, Skating Rink
- Opened: 1973
- Surface: concrete
- Owner: City of Toronto government
- Address: 150 Borough Drive; Toronto, Ontario, Canada
- Location of Albert Campbell Square in Toronto
- Coordinates: 43°46′25″N 79°15′25″W
- Website: Toronto Parks

Albert Campbell Square is a public square in Scarborough City Centre in Scarborough, Toronto, Ontario, Canada. It is named after Albert Campbell, the first mayor of the Borough of Scarborough and former chairman of the Municipality of Metropolitan Toronto. Albert Campbell Square is located at 150 Borough Drive, adjacent to the Scarborough Civic Centre south of Scarborough Centre station and Scarborough Town Centre shopping mall.

== Features ==
The Albert Campbell Square was modelled after Nathan Phillips Square (built 1965) in Downtown Toronto and in turn inspired Mel Lastman Square (built 1989) in North York City Centre. Part of the Albert Campbell Square is an outdoor ice rink, which held its status of being Scarborough's only permanent outdoor ice rink until the construction for an outdoor ice rink at McCowan District Park began in 2014.

== Events ==
Albert Campbell Square has hosted a number of events. It has served as the starting point of the annual Scarborough Canada Day Parade, one of two Canada Day parades produced by the City of Toronto government. On 11 July 1980, crowds gathered at Albert Campbell Square to witness the arrival of Canadian athlete Terry Fox, whose scheduled stop was at Scarborough Civic Centre during his Marathon of Hope. On 24 July 2016, Rick Tocchet, retired NHL right wing, at the time coach of the Pittsburgh Penguins and Scarborough native, exhibited the Stanley Cup at the square after the team won the 2016 Stanley Cup Finals. Albert Campbell Square also hosted viewing parties during the 2019 NBA Finals, which featured the Toronto Raptors.

The square has been a popular venue for multicultural events, including the Toronto International Dance Festival (from 2018 - present), Scarborough Afro-Carib Festival (2001–present), Scarborough Community Multicultural Festival (2015–2017), and the Sri Lankan Kothu Fest (2015–present).

== Public Art ==
Albert Campbell Square and the immediate surrounding area is home to a large number of sculptures and other public works of art. Some of the works, such as the Hand of God by Carl Milles date back to the building of the Scarborough Civic Centre in the 1970s. In 1994 Scarborough hosted the International Granite Sculpture Symposium, which added a further 8 works. As of 2017, there are over 10 pieces of public art on display. Albert Campbell Square has also hosted temporary exhibits for Nuit Blanche and public performances of contemporary art.

== See also ==
- Nathan Phillips Square
- Pecaut Square
- Mel Lastman Square
