= Scarborough Town Centre =

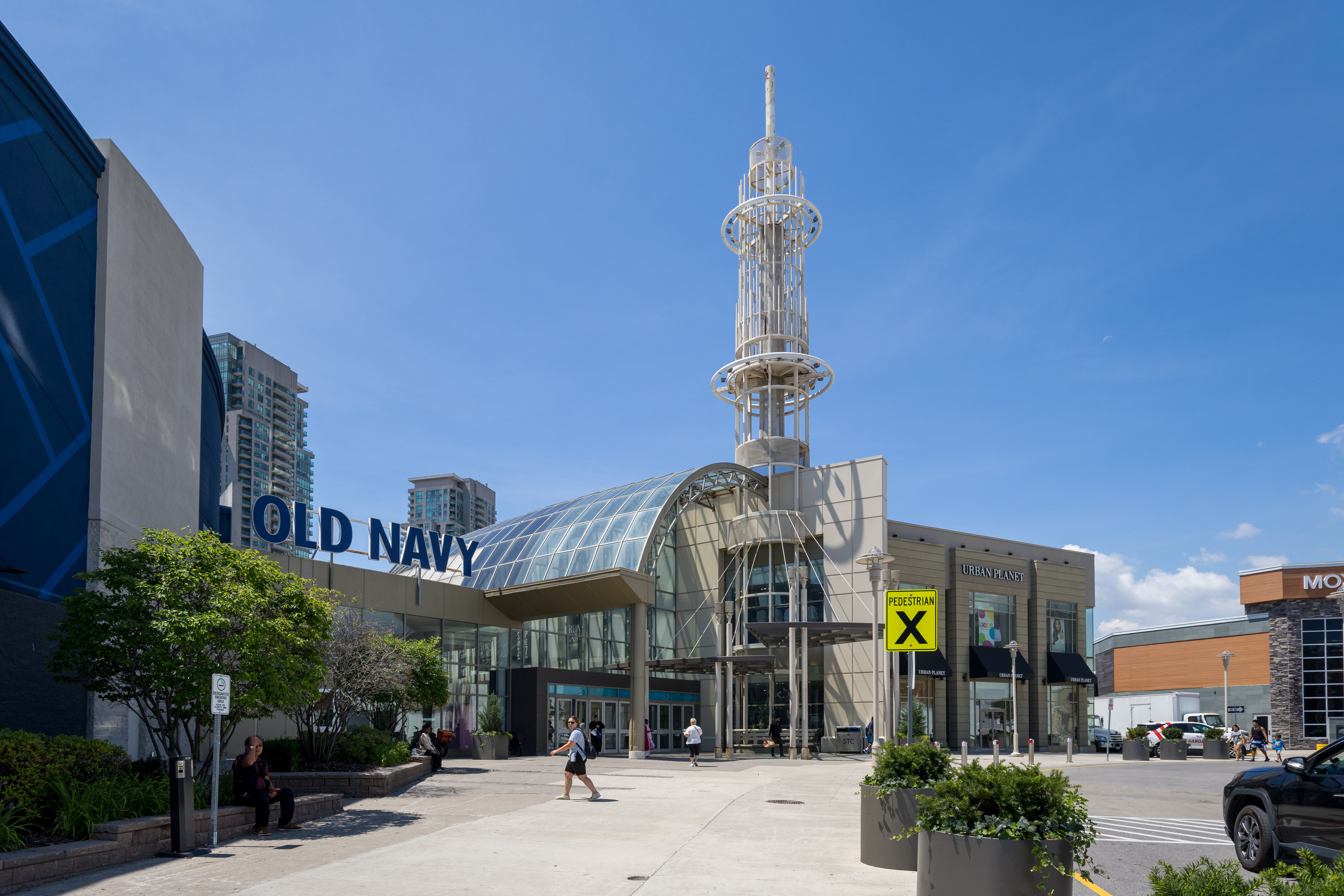
- Location: Toronto, Ontario, Canada
- Coordinates: 43.776354°N 79.258279°W
- Address: 300 Borough Drive
- Opened: May 2, 1973
- Developer: Trizec Corporation
- Manager: Oxford Properties
- Owner: Alberta Investment Management Corporation and OMERS
- Num. of stores: 250+
- Num. of anchor tenants: 3
- Floor area: 121,000 m^{2} (1,300,000 sq ft)
- Floors: 2
- Parking: 3000 spaces
- Public transit: Scarborough Centre Bus Terminal; Toronto Transit Commission Buses
- Website: scarboroughtowncentre.com

Scarborough Town Centre (STC or Scarborough Town) is a shopping mall in Toronto, Ontario, Canada. Central to the Scarborough City Centre district, it is adjacent to Scarborough Centre station, the Scarborough Centre Bus Terminal and the CTV Toronto studios (9 Channel Nine Court). Opened in 1973, the mall is the fourth largest shopping mall in Canada and third in Toronto by retail space.

== Description ==
The mall is located on the north side of Albert Campbell Square, across from the Scarborough Civic Centre.

The mall is served by Highway 401 and can also be reached through a turnaround ramp on McCowan Road, Progress Avenue, and Brimley Road. The TTC's Line 3 Scarborough had a station adjacent to the mall, Scarborough Centre, opened in 1985 with service running southwest to Kennedy station on the Bloor–Danforth line and east to McCowan Station, but it closed permanently in 2023. Scarborough Centre is a busy terminal for a number of TTC, GO Transit and Durham Regional Transit bus routes.

Scarborough Town Centre currently includes Walmart, and Cineplex Cinemas as its anchors. It has more than 121,000 m^{2} (1,300,000 sq ft) and about 250 plus stores, making it the fourth-largest shopping centre in Greater Toronto, after Square One Shopping Centre, Yorkdale Shopping Centre, and Toronto Eaton Centre.

The mall itself and most of the land surrounding it are owned by OMERS (the Ontario Municipal Employees Retirement System) pension fund under their Oxford Properties division.

=== Scarborough Walk of Fame ===
In 2006, ten prominent members of Scarborough's community were inducted into the Scarborough Walk of Fame, and this was the first annual ceremony. The stars (plaques) of the Walk of Fame are located behind the main atrium, in front of H&M. Formerly, they were located on a walkway between the food courts of the mall, on the upper level.

The first inductees were burn-unit founder Dr. Lloyd N. Carlsen, educator Dr. R. H. King, NBA player Jamaal Magloire, pulmonary scientist Dr. Charles C. Macklin, artist Doris McCarthy, Lieutenant Governor of Ontario and former television personality, The Honourable David Onley, Olympic hockey player Vicky Sunohara, pioneer David Thomson, hip-hop artist Wes Williams, and geriatric care entrepreneur Dr. Joseph Yu Kai Wong.

== History ==
The mall was constructed in 1972 and opened on May 2, 1973. At that time, it included two major Canadian department stores, Simpson's and Eaton's. Miracle Food Mart, a supermarket, was also located in the mall; part of the Steinbergs chain, it was co-located with a Miracle Mart, a discount department store. It was designed to serve as part of the civic and commercial centre of what was then the Borough of Scarborough. Scarborough Town Centre opened with 130 stores adjacent to the borough's administration buildings. It provided a central landmark in an otherwise newer suburban area of Toronto.

Originally Y-shaped, with its stem towards the Civic Centre, a second phase of construction added the northern former The Bay department store and two wings. The construction added 22,000 m^{2} (240,000 sq ft) of retail space and was opened on August 8, 1979. This made STC the second shopping mall in history (after Quebec's Promenades Saint-Bruno) to simultaneously have Eaton's, Simpson's and The Bay.

In 1991, Simpson's rebranded as The Bay. The former The Bay store was emptied and extensively refurbished before reopening on September 25, 1991, as a Sears with essentially the same staff as the previous occupant. It was the largest of the eight locations that Sears acquired from the dismantling of the Simpsons chain.

In 1998-1999, the mall was expanded once again to allow more anchor stores and retail space.

After Eaton's closed, Sears relocated to the space on July 17, 2000, becoming one of the company's largest stores nationwide. Walmart opened its 160,000 square foot store on July 26, 2001.

The mall's latest renovation in 2010, branded "Lighten Up," gave retailers such as Victoria's Secret interest in retail space. Victoria's Secret opened one of Canada's first Pink stores in the former Disney Store in July 2010. Other major retailers, Forever 21 and Aritzia, have replaced Sport Chek and Birks. The mall has the largest Zara store in the east GTA at 2,200 m^{2} (24,000 sq ft).

On August 4, 2016, the new food court opened below the existing food court and was branded as TASTE MRKT. The upper level of the food court is now closed and has reopened as a mall space with a unique dining atmosphere for shoppers by offering more upscale, interior-patio-style seating underneath the existing skylight. Later a Jollibee, Tim Hortons, and a Ramen Place opened. The Disney Store closed and became a Game Store, which moved to the old Skechers location in early-mid 2025, with the new Sukoski Mart location opening there

The Sears store closed in late 2017 as part of the liquidation of Canadian operations. The Sears store is expected to be redeveloped by the mall in the future, though they have not yet said what is planned. The 1st floor has been remodelled into Urban Behavior. In 2018, the mall opened a Muji store near the Centre Court. The store is the 5th in the GTA. A Miniso also opened outside of Walmart, in the former Roots Canada, which has relocated next to Aritzia. In February 2021, it was announced that the second level of the former Sears location had been prepared as a large-scale clinic for distribution of the COVID-19 vaccine during the COVID-19 pandemic in Toronto. On August 23, 2023, an IKEA store opened on the lower level of the former Sears space. On October 14, 2023, a Decathlon store opened on the upper level of the former Sears space and on May 13, 2024, a Toys "R" Us opened. Hudson’s Bay closed on June 1 as part of the company’s liquidation. In Summer 2025 a Winners is set to open replacing Gap and also replacing The Old Sukoski Mart Store, Victoria's Secret, and Muji. Decathlon closed on July 31st 2025, which became a temporary location for Urban Behaviour, which reappeared in the mall.

On June 1, 2025, Hudson's Bay permanently closed after 47 years of operation.

On June 25, 2025, it was announced the Decathlon would be permanently closing along with all other GTA locations; the store was closed on July 31, 2025.

On August 21, 2025, a man was shot and killed in a shooting inside the family washroom near the lower-level food court. The victim was identified as 19-year-old Daniel Amalathas. Police have deemed the shooting a homicide. On August 29, two 17-year-old boys were arrested and charged with second-degree murder in connection with the shooting.

On October 7, 2025, it was announced that IKEA City would be closing down after two years of operation, with the location permanently closed on January 5, 2026.

After Christmas 2025, the Toys "R" Us permanently closed after one year of operation along with 40 other Canadian stores.

== Proposed development ==
Currently, multiple plans are proposed for the shopping mall and its surroundings.

=== Scarborough Subway Extension ===
The extension of TTC's Line 2 Bloor-Danforth subway line is currently under construction, which will extend the line 7.8 kilometers. The extension will start from Kennedy station and go north towards McCowan Road and Sheppard Avenue with a station at the centre. This will replace the current Line 3 Scarborough that passes through the centre. The extension is expected to be complete around 2030.

=== Redevelopment of the centre ===
A proposal was created by Oxford Properties to redevelop the centre. For the first phase, the existing Cineplex Cinemas would be demolished to create space for the subway extension to the mall and a new transit hub. The current theatre would be replaced with a new movie theatre adjacent to the former Sears location. The Sears location would be renovated and divided into at least 18 retail units with three levels. A pedestrian walkway will connect the mall with the new movie theatre.

== Gallery ==
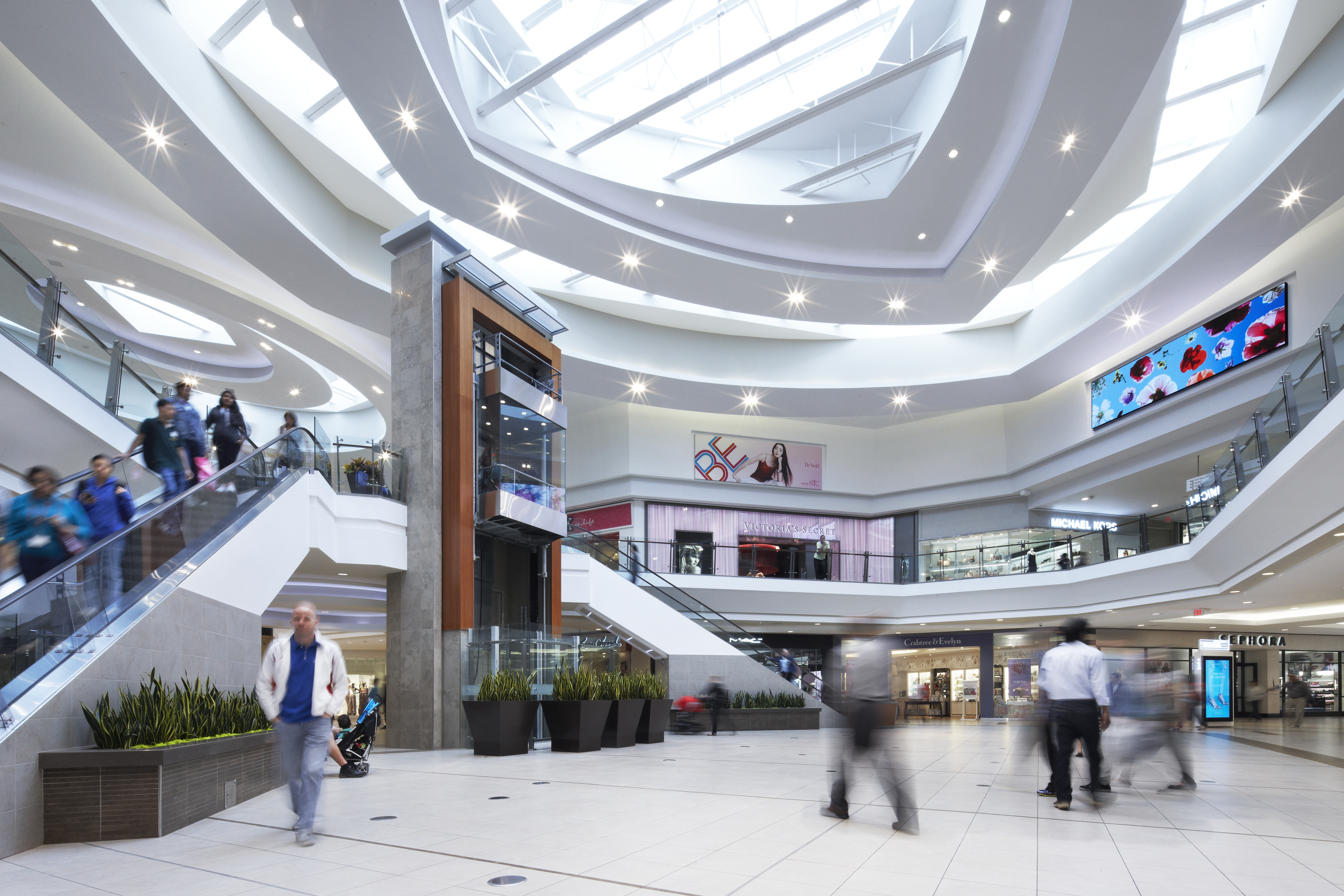
Centre court, 2015

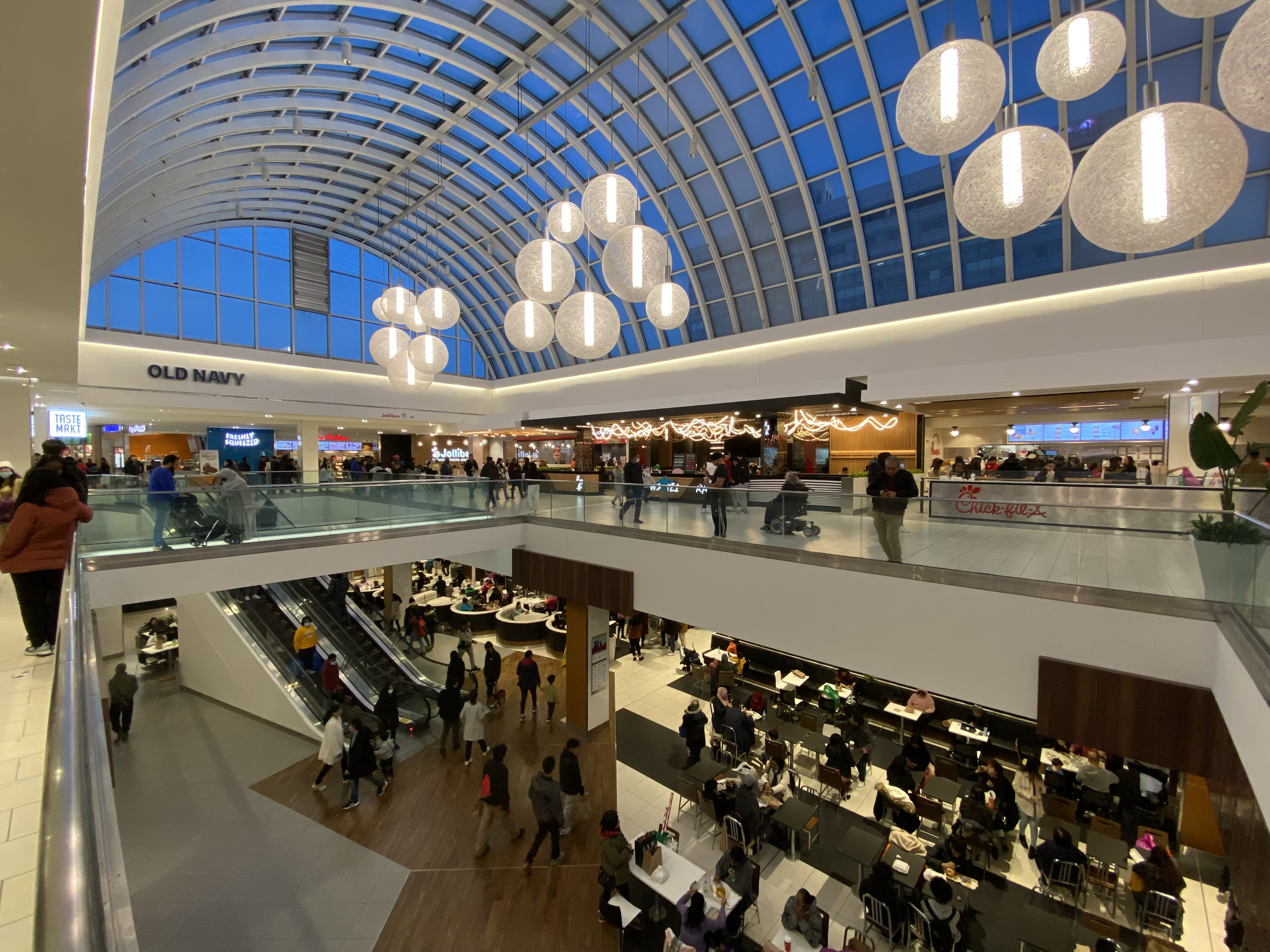
Food court, 2022

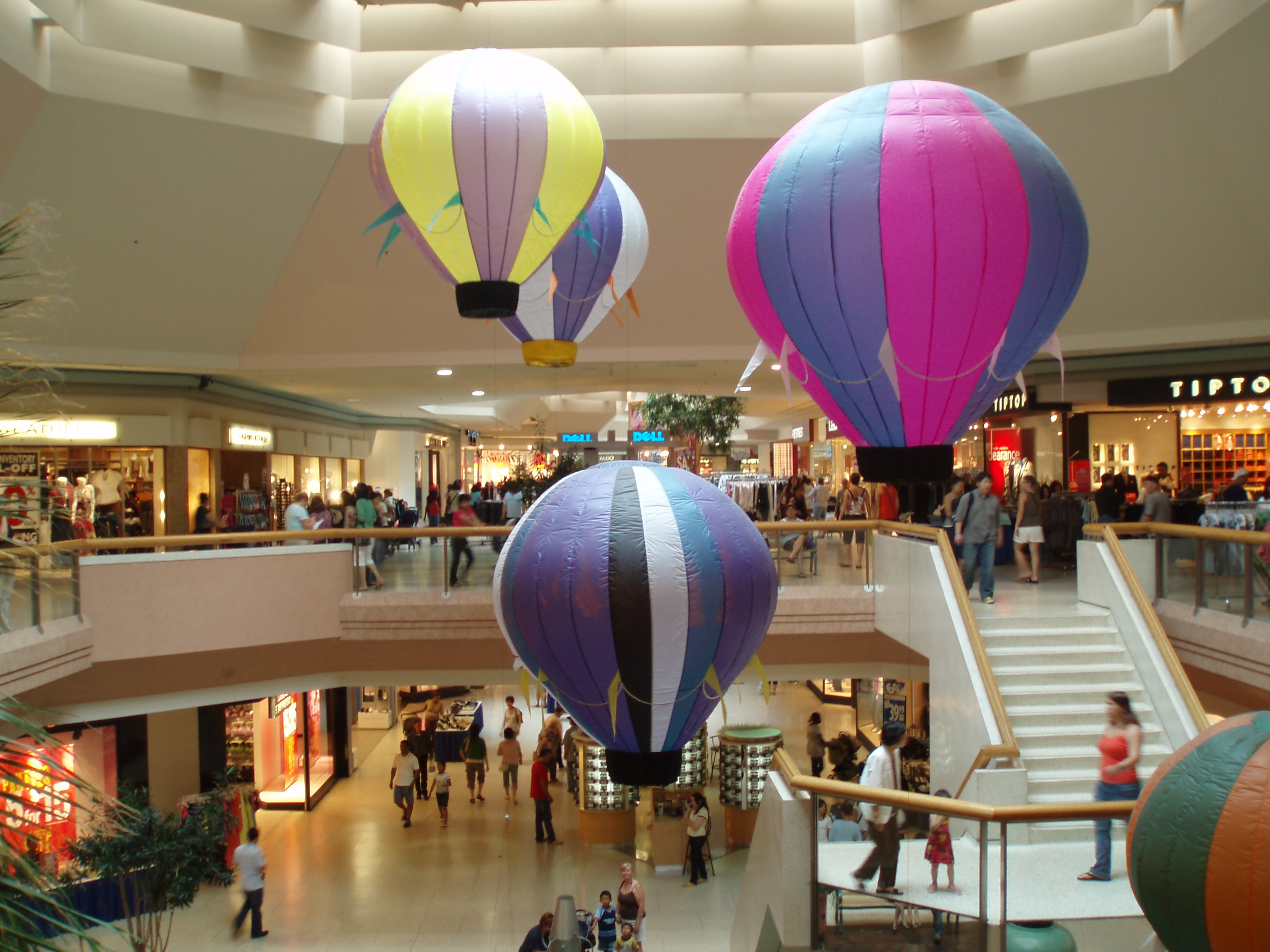
The mall in the mid-2000s with miniature hot-air balloons

=== Anchors ===
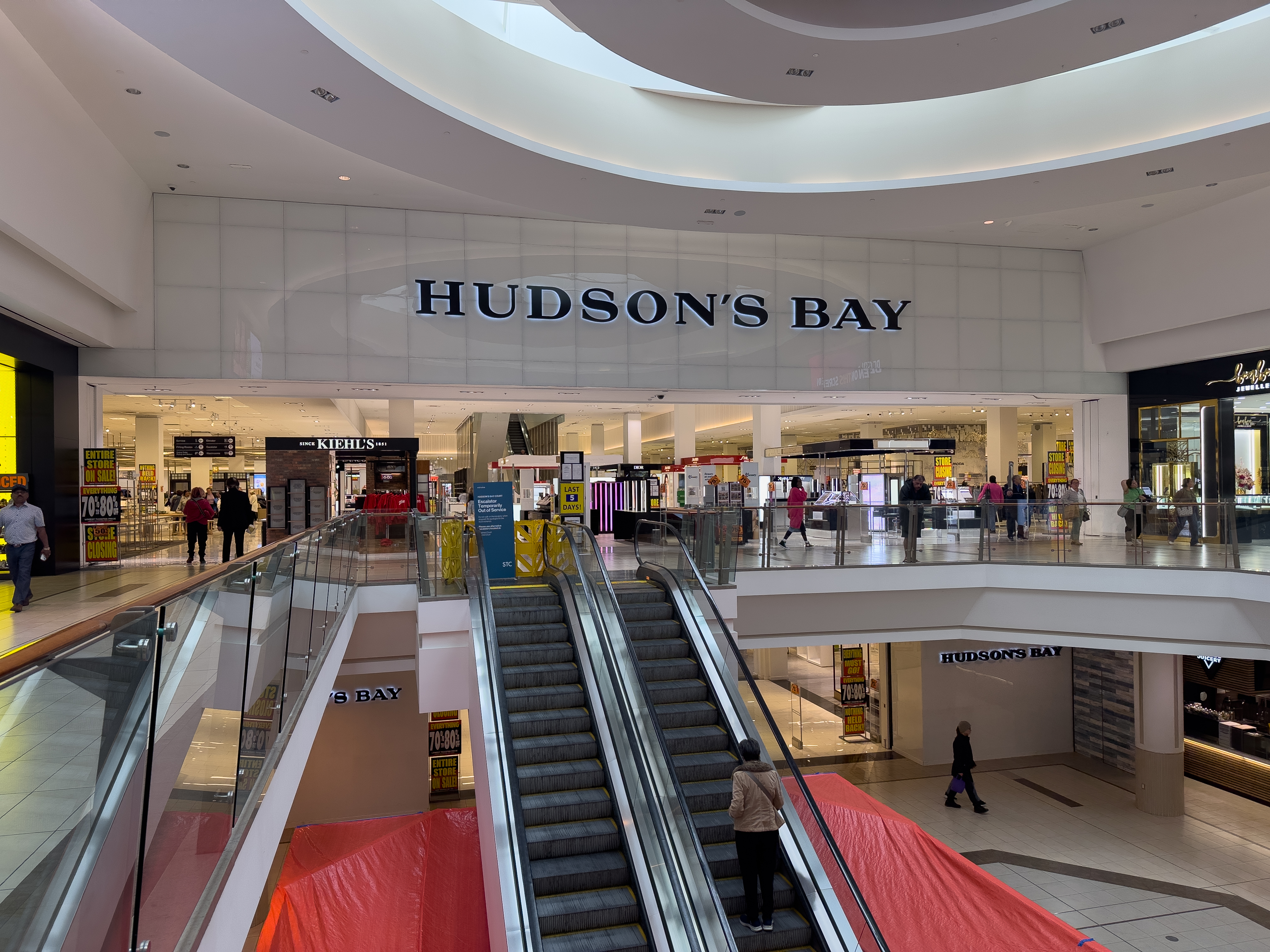
Former mall entrance of Hudson's Bay

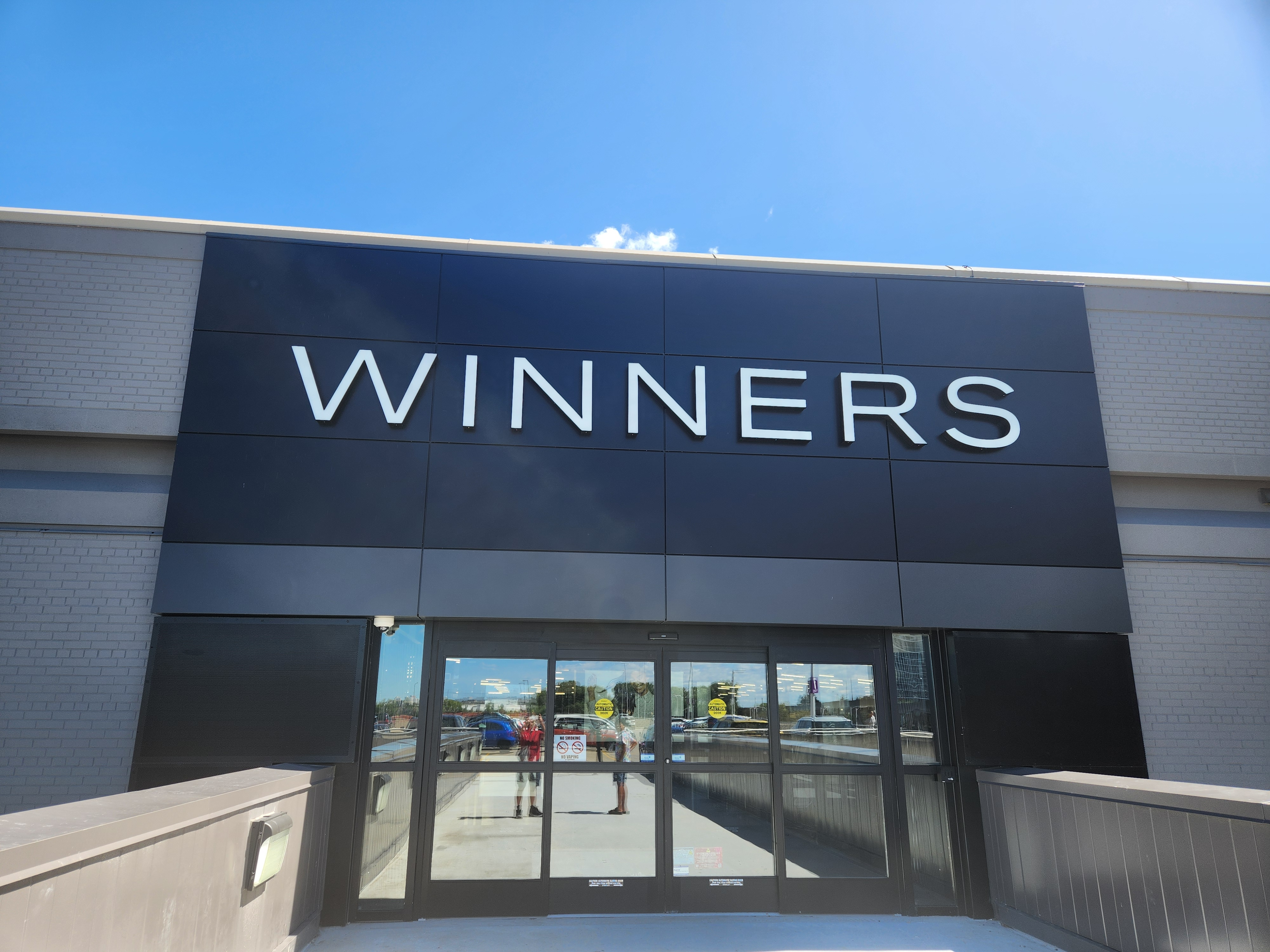
Winners formerly Gap

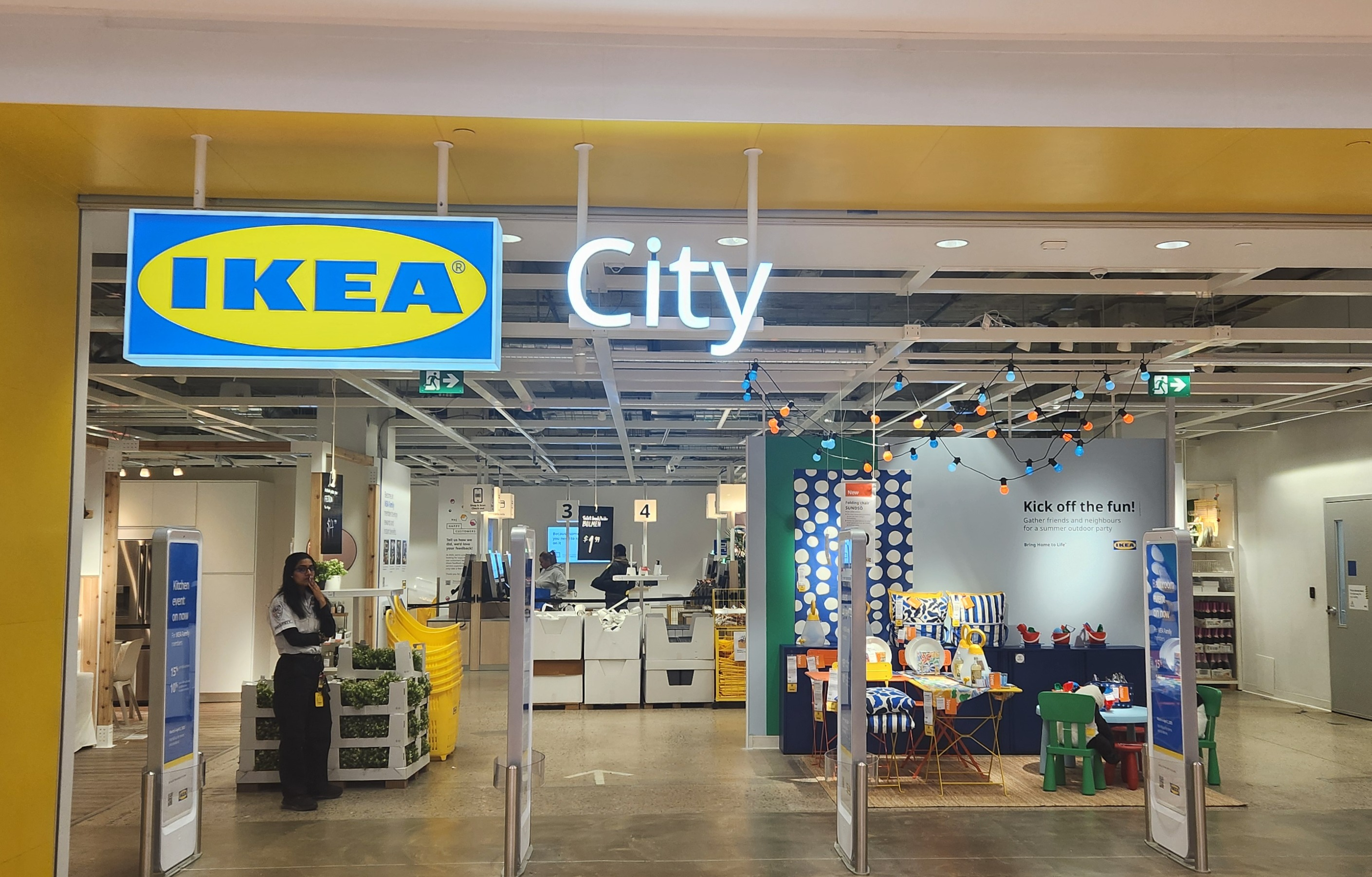
Former IKEA City

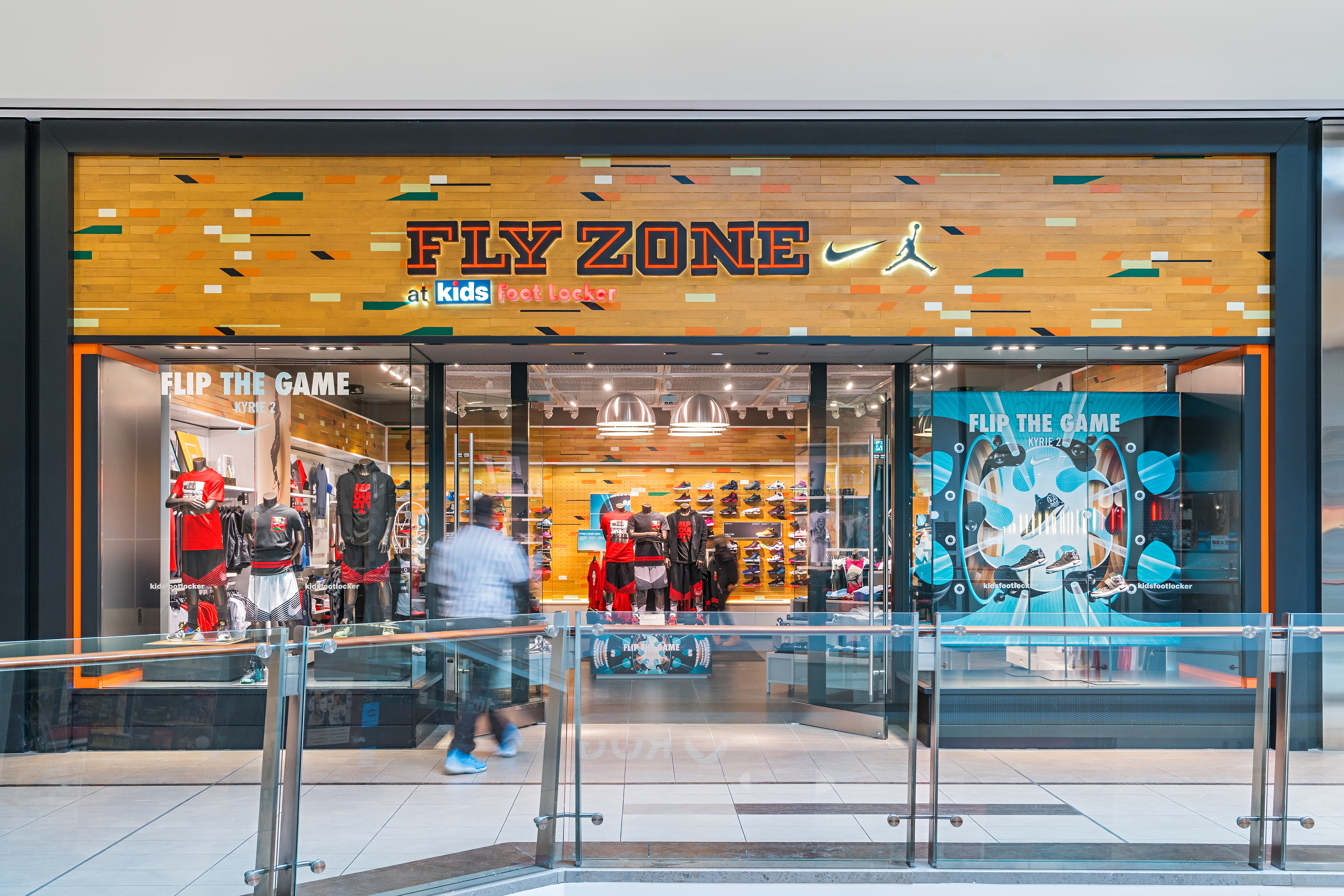
Kids Footlocker Fly Zone

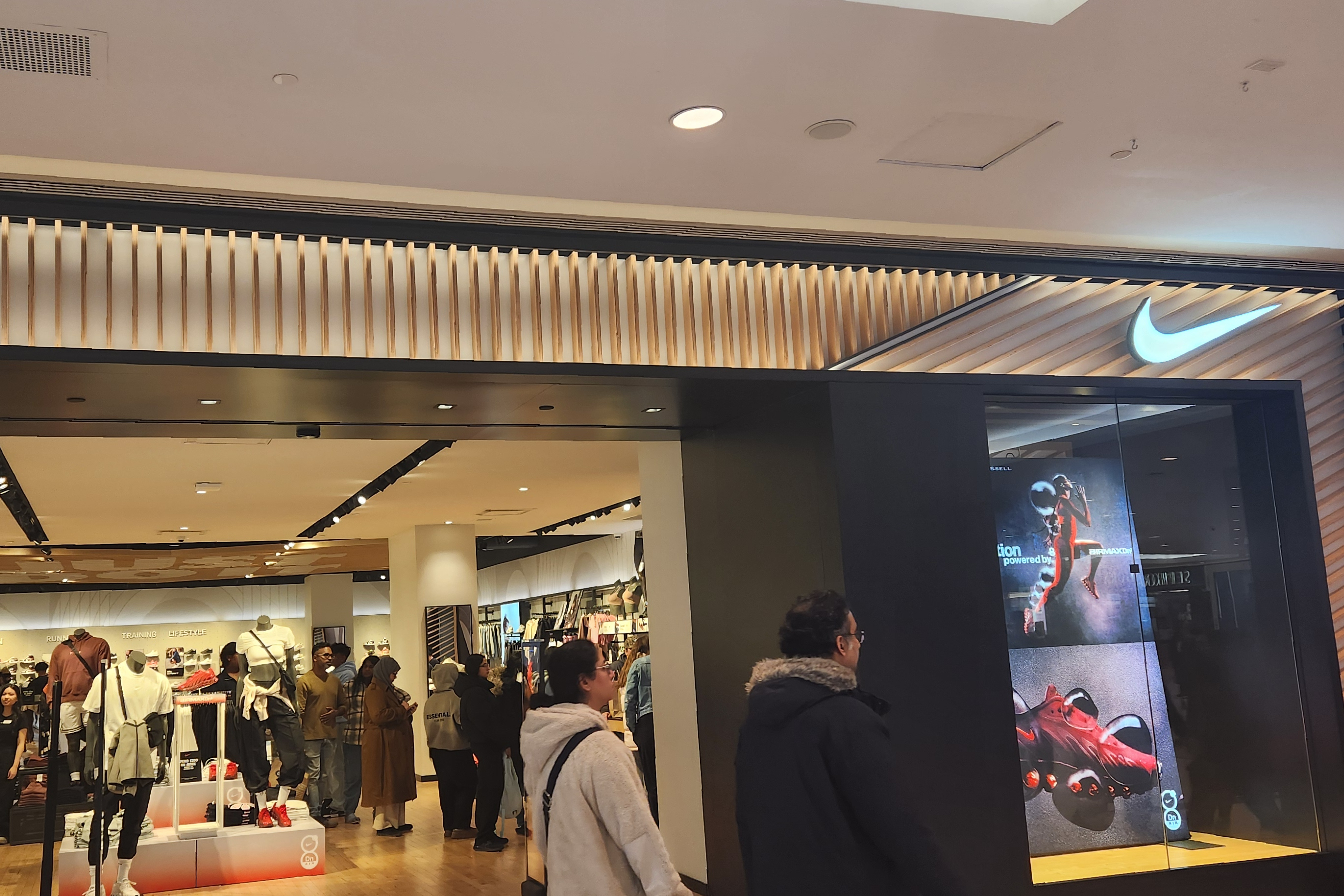
Nike

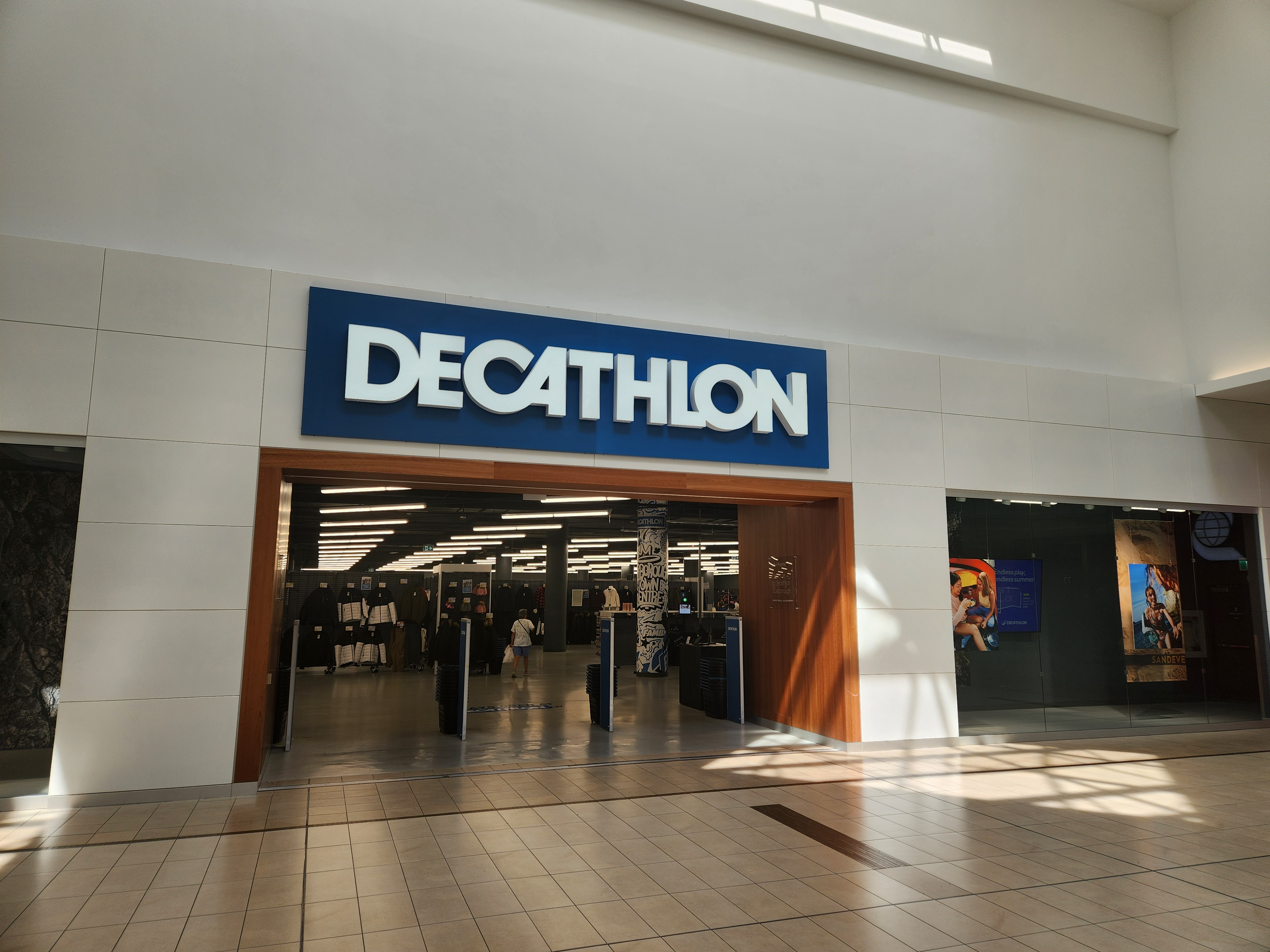
Decathlon This store has now closed.

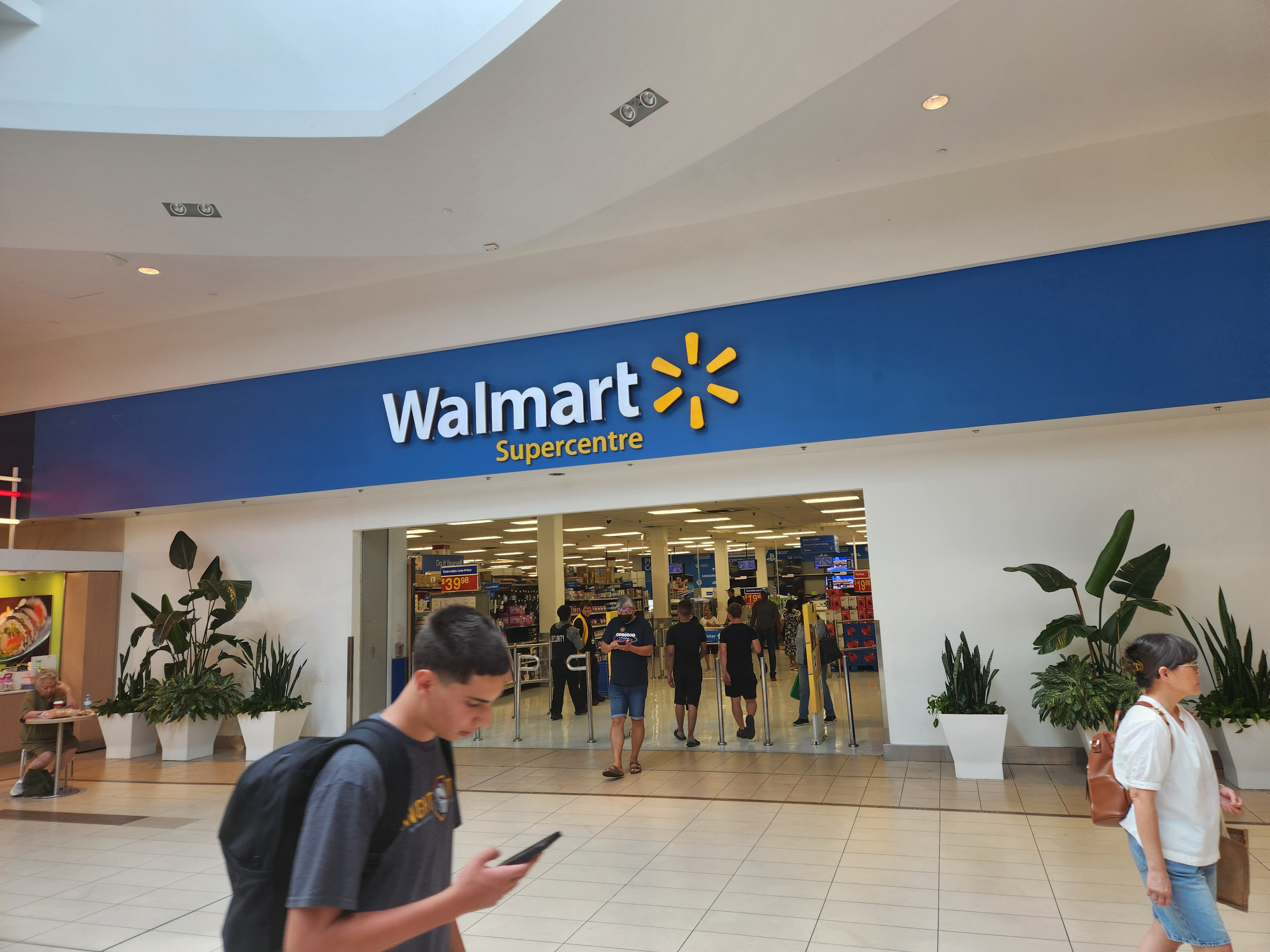
Walmart

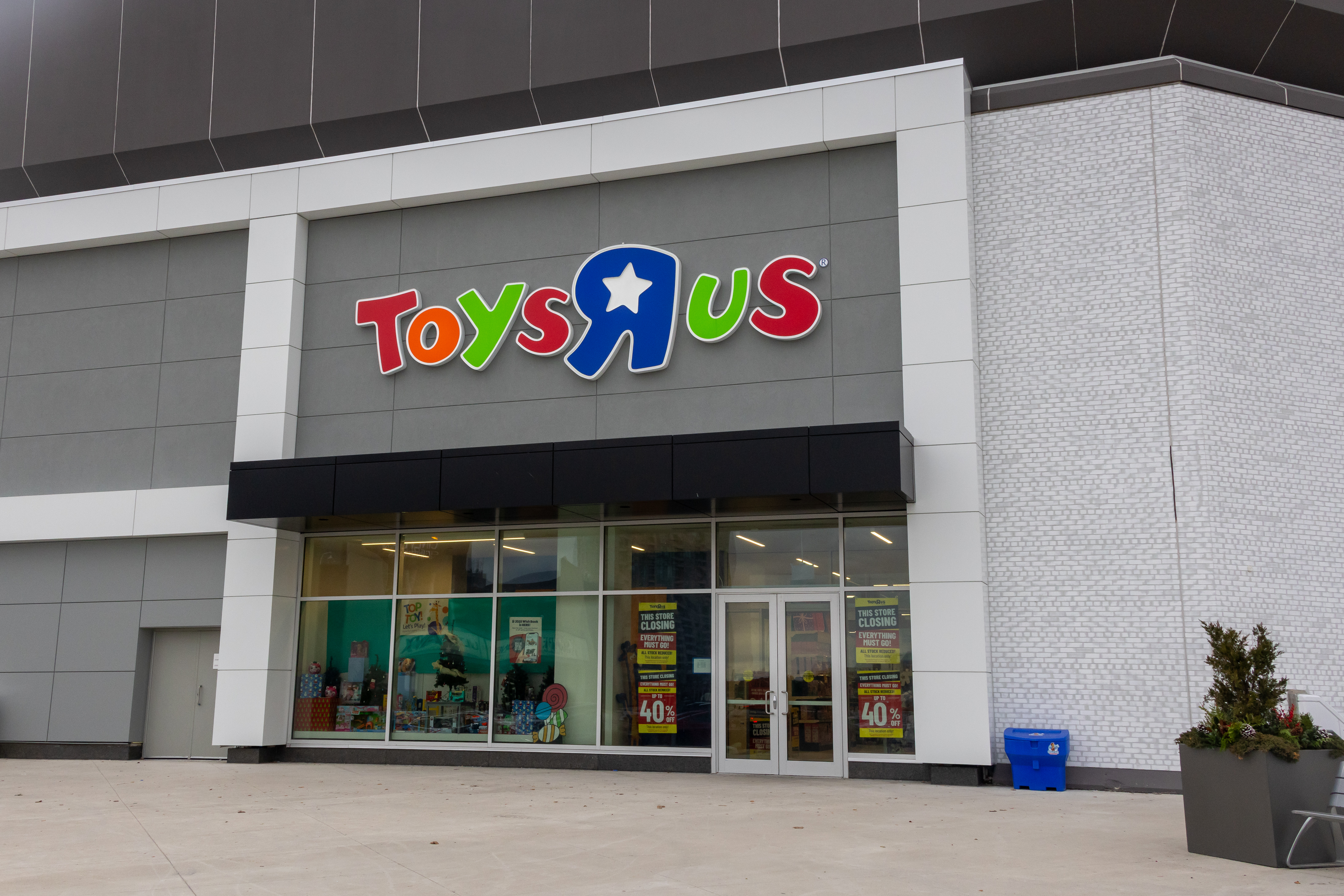
Former Toys "R" Us

== See also ==
- List of shopping malls in Canada
- List of shopping malls in Toronto
- List of largest enclosed shopping malls in Canada
