= S series (Toronto subway) =

Former Toronto subway light metro rolling stock

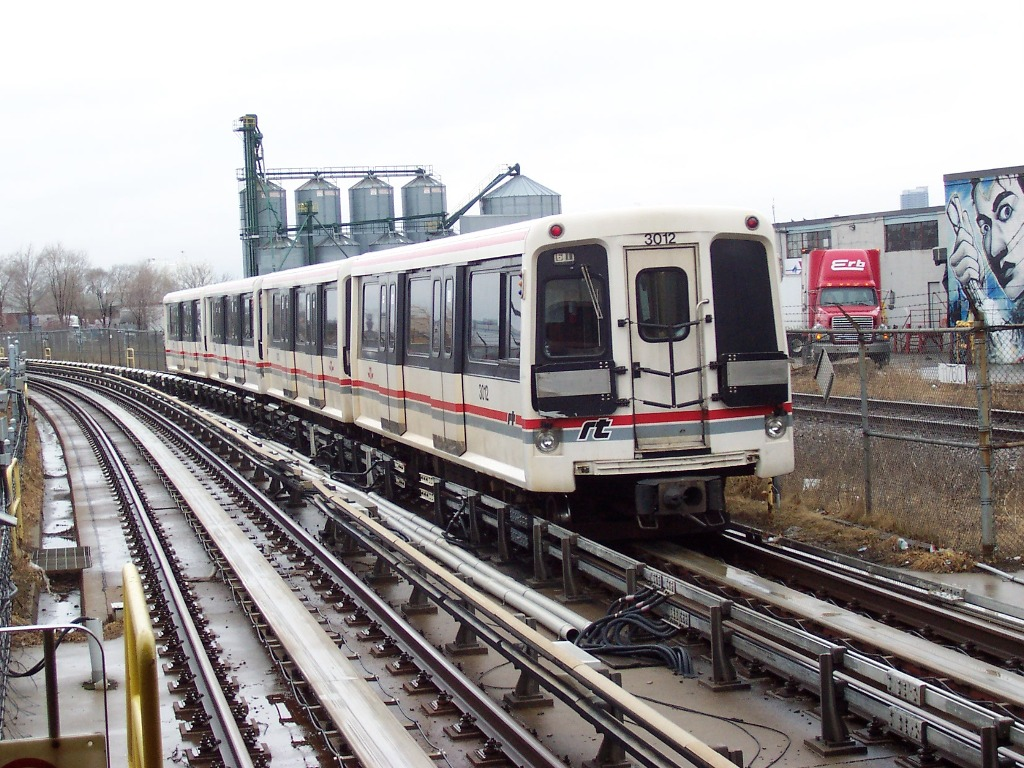
- An S-1 train in its original livery

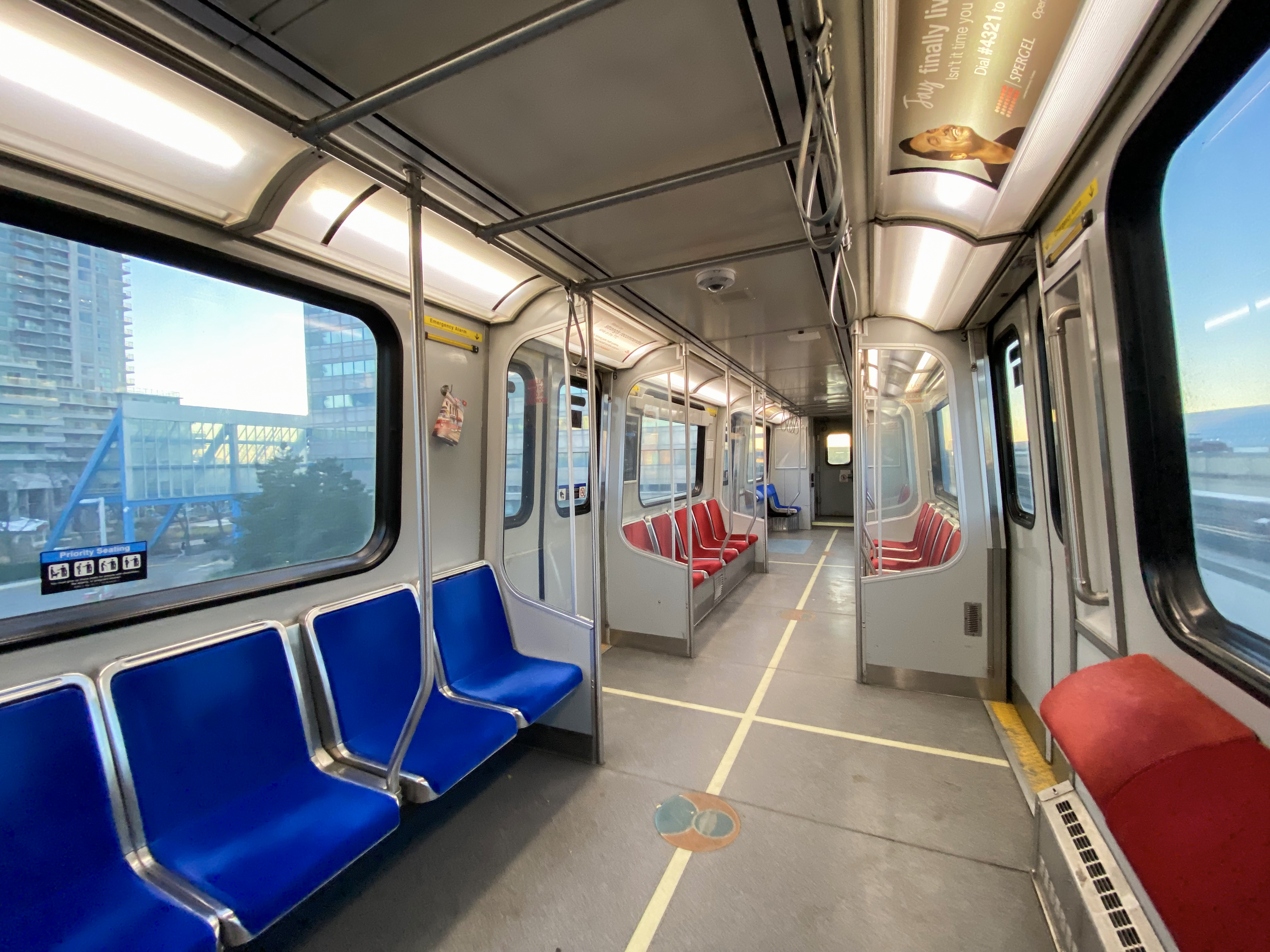
- Interior of an S-series train after refurbishment
- In service: 1985–2023
- Manufacturer: Urban Transportation Development Corporation
- Family name: ICTS
- Constructed: 1983–1986
- Refurbished: 2015–2016
- Number built: 28
- Number preserved: 2
- Number scrapped: 1
- Formation: Toronto: 4-car trains (2 sets of semi-permanently mated pairs); Detroit: 2-car trains
- Fleet numbers: 3000–3027; 2 unnumbered test cars used for testing by UTDC
- Capacity: 30 seated, 55 standing
- Operators: Toronto Transit Commission (until 2023); Detroit People Mover (future)
- Depot: McCowan Yard
- Line served: Line 3 Scarborough

Specifications
- Car body construction: Aluminum
- Car length: 12.70 m (41 ft 8 in)
- Width: 2.49 m (8 ft 2 in)
- Doors: 4 sets (2 sets per side) per car
- Maximum speed: 70 km/h (43 mph)
- Weight: 15,440 kg (34,050 lb)
- Traction system: GTO-VVVF (UTDC)
- Traction motors: 3-phase AC linear induction motor
- Power output: 89.5 kW (120 hp)
- Electric system: 600 V DC
- Current collection: Linear induction
- Track gauge: 1,435 mm (4 ft 8 1/2 in) standard gauge

The S series was the light metro rolling stock used on Line 3 Scarborough, part of the subway system of Toronto, Ontario, Canada. They were built from 1983 to 1986 for the Toronto Transit Commission (TTC) by the Urban Transportation Development Corporation (UTDC) in Millhaven, Ontario. The trains use UTDC's proprietary linear motor-based Intermediate Capacity Transit System (ICTS, now branded as Bombardier Innovia Metro) and are its Mark I model, which is also used by the Vancouver SkyTrain and the Detroit People Mover. They consist of 14 married pair sets (28 cars total) with fleet numbers 3000 to 3027, and are not compatible with the trains on other Toronto lines, which use conventional motors.

Test runs took place in 1984 and full service began in 1985. When the line opened, 12 sets operated individually as two-car units. In 1986, two more sets were added, allowing sets to be coupled to form four-car units as ridership grew. All trains operated automatically without human intervention. Although they were capable of unmanned operations, as in Vancouver and Detroit, the TTC opted to use one-person train operation on all Line 3 trains.

After the retirement of the remaining H-series trains in 2014, the S-series trains were the oldest in operation on the entire subway system until their retirement in 2023. They were also the only TTC rapid transit trains with a painted livery since the G series, consisting of a unique lowercase "rt" logo, referring to the line's original name of "Scarborough RT". Starting in 2015, the cars underwent refurbishment, which included the addition of blue shrink wrap on their exterior to prolong their lifespan until the line's closure in 2023.

In December 2023, the TTC proposed selling five trainsets to Detroit for use on the Detroit People Mover, with two trainsets being retained for preservation. In June 2024, the Detroit People Mover transit system announced the purchase of the Mark I train sets and equipment from Line 3. Their transportation to and integration with the Detroit People Mover was projected to take over a year and a half. The purchase would replace the system's existing train sets with upgraded features, along with providing much-needed parts needed to keep the system functional.

In November 2024, the TTC announced that two cars would be preserved at the Halton County Radial Railway in Rockwood, Ontario, and one car would be put on display at the Toronto Zoo.

== Gallery ==
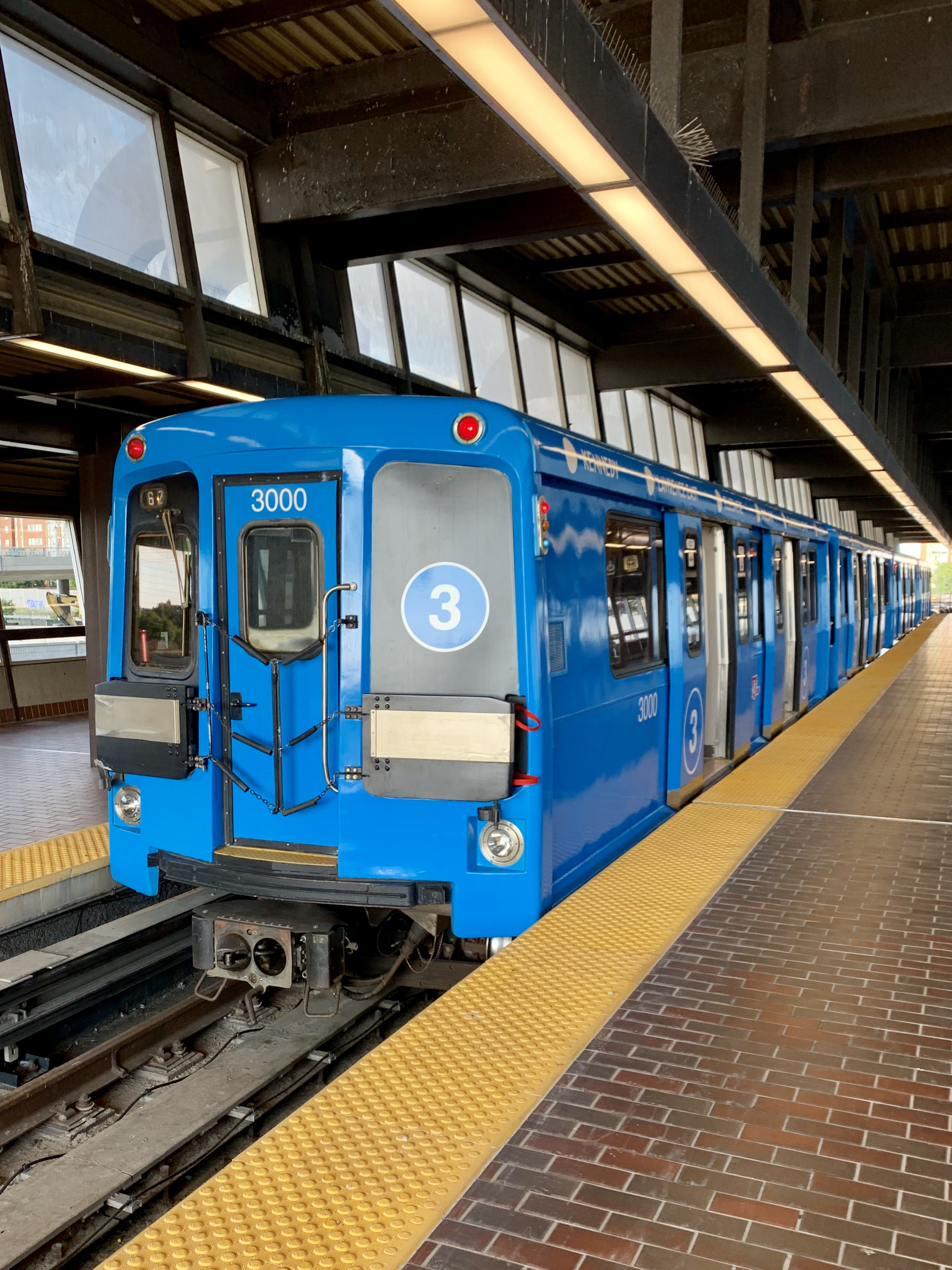
An S-series train at the Line 3 platform of Kennedy station

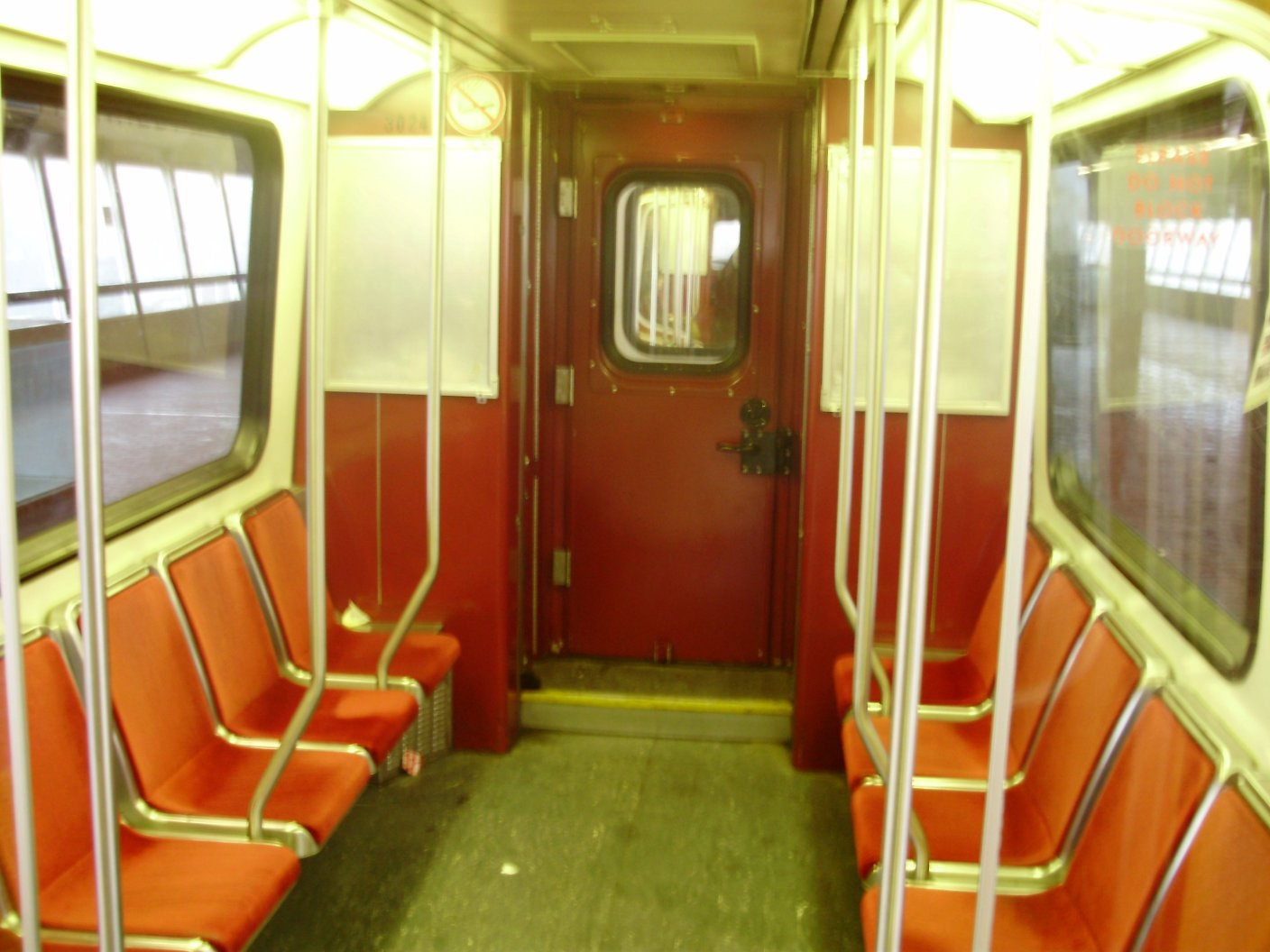
Older interior prior to refurbishment

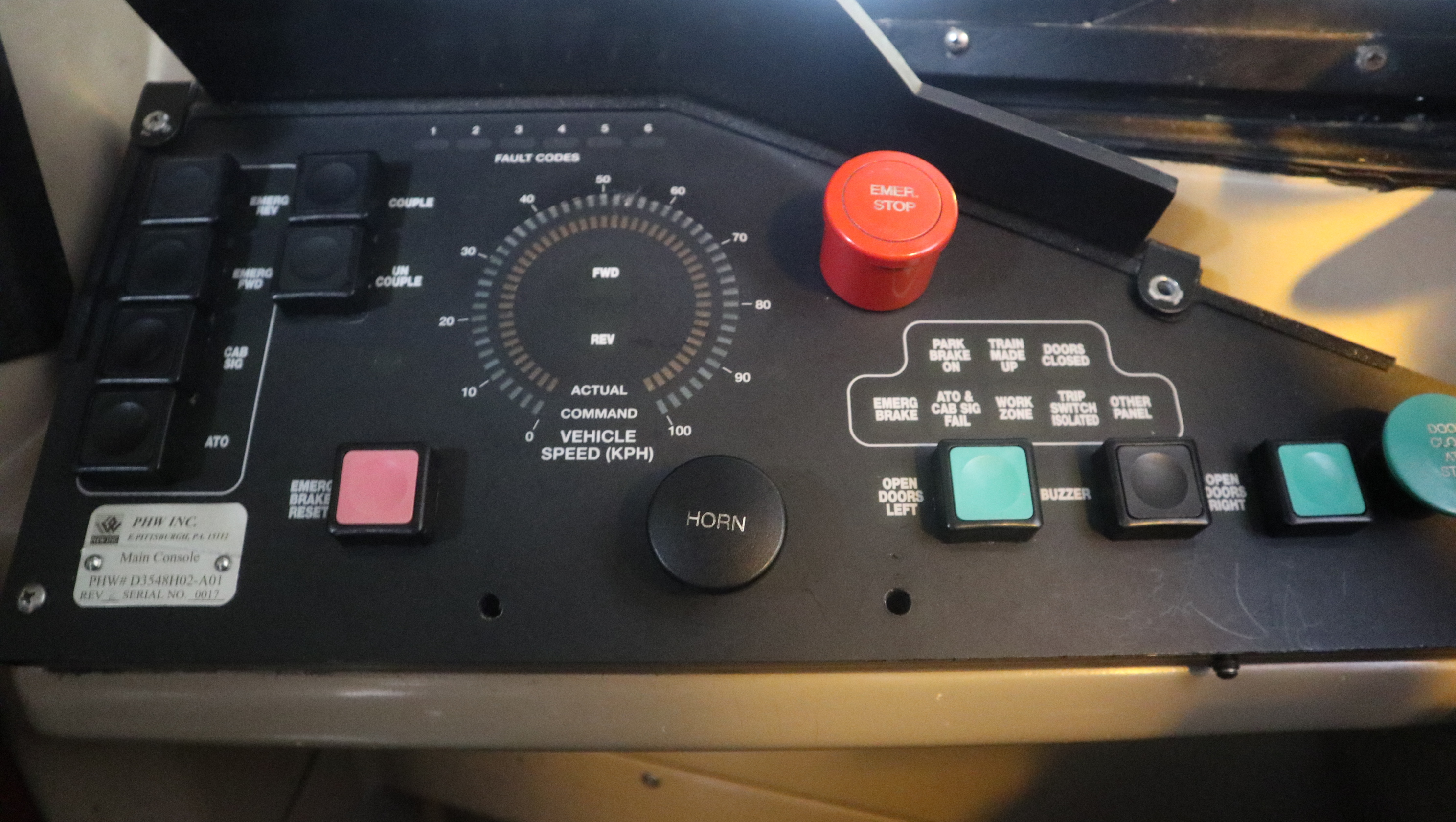
S-series control panel

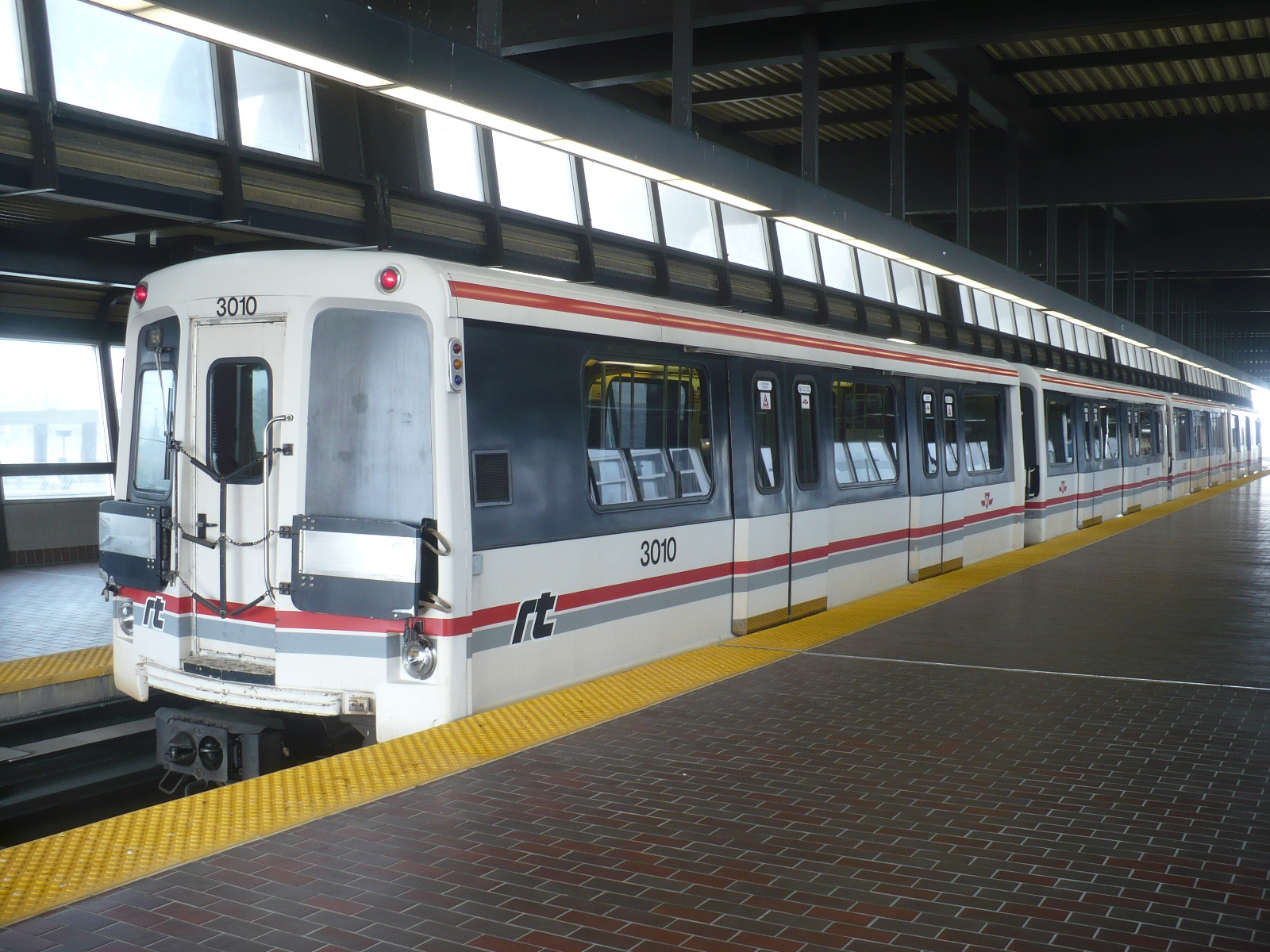
S-series with older livery at Kennedy station

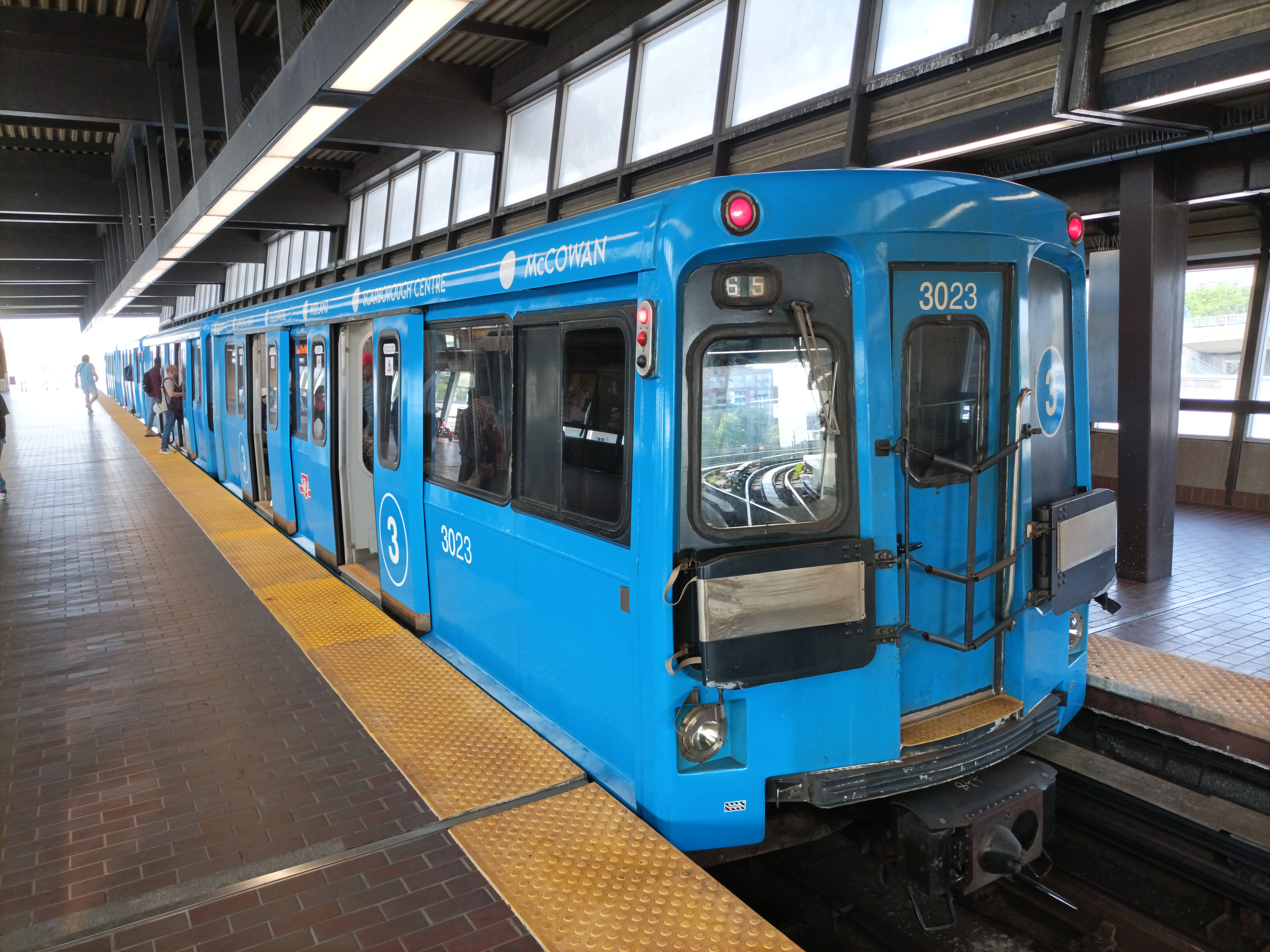
S-series with newer livery at Kennedy station

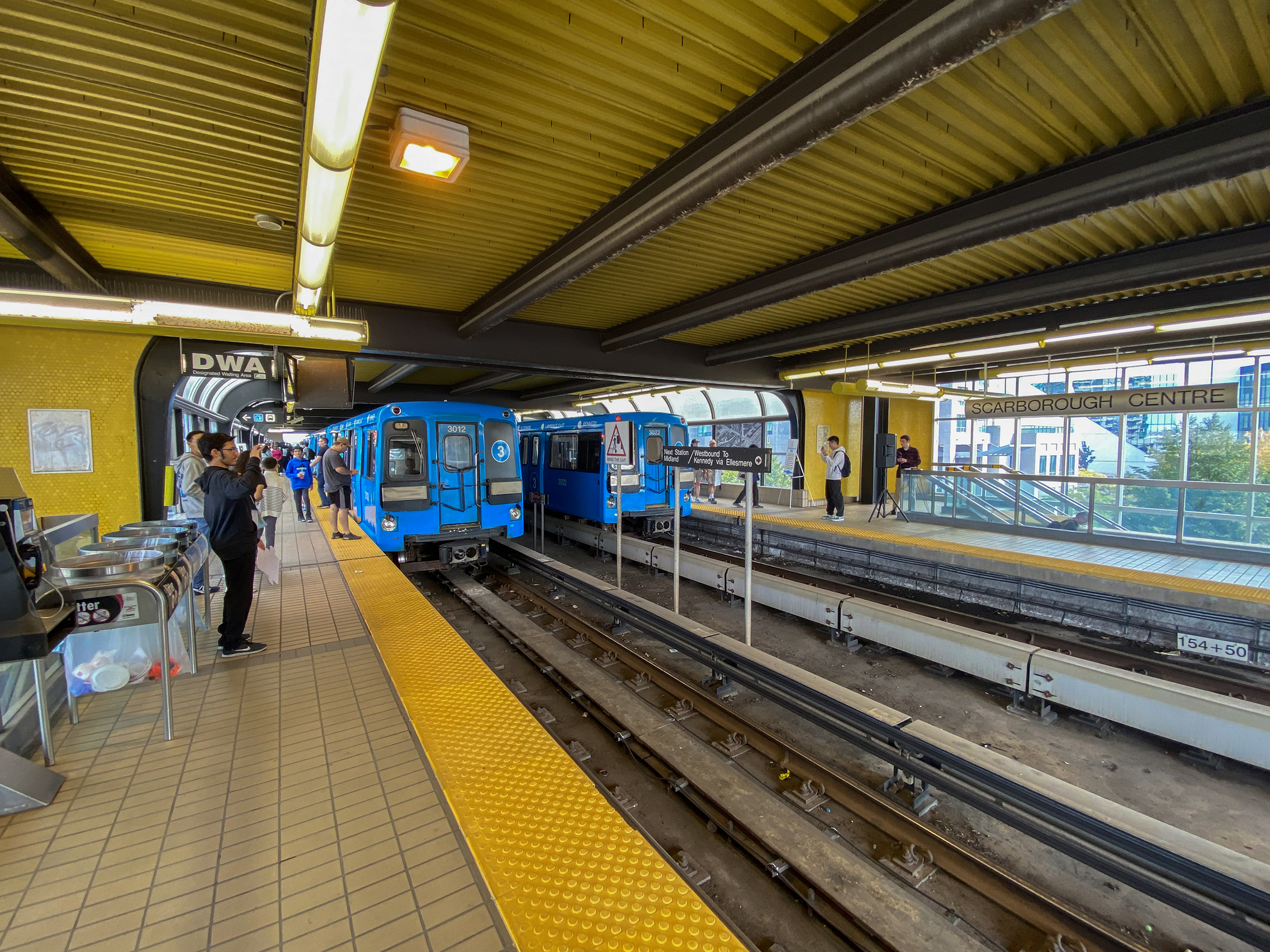
Two S-series trains at Scarborough Centre station during the Farewell Line 3 event
