= McCowan Yard =

Rail yard in Toronto, Canada

Coordinates: 43.7746°N 79.2469°W

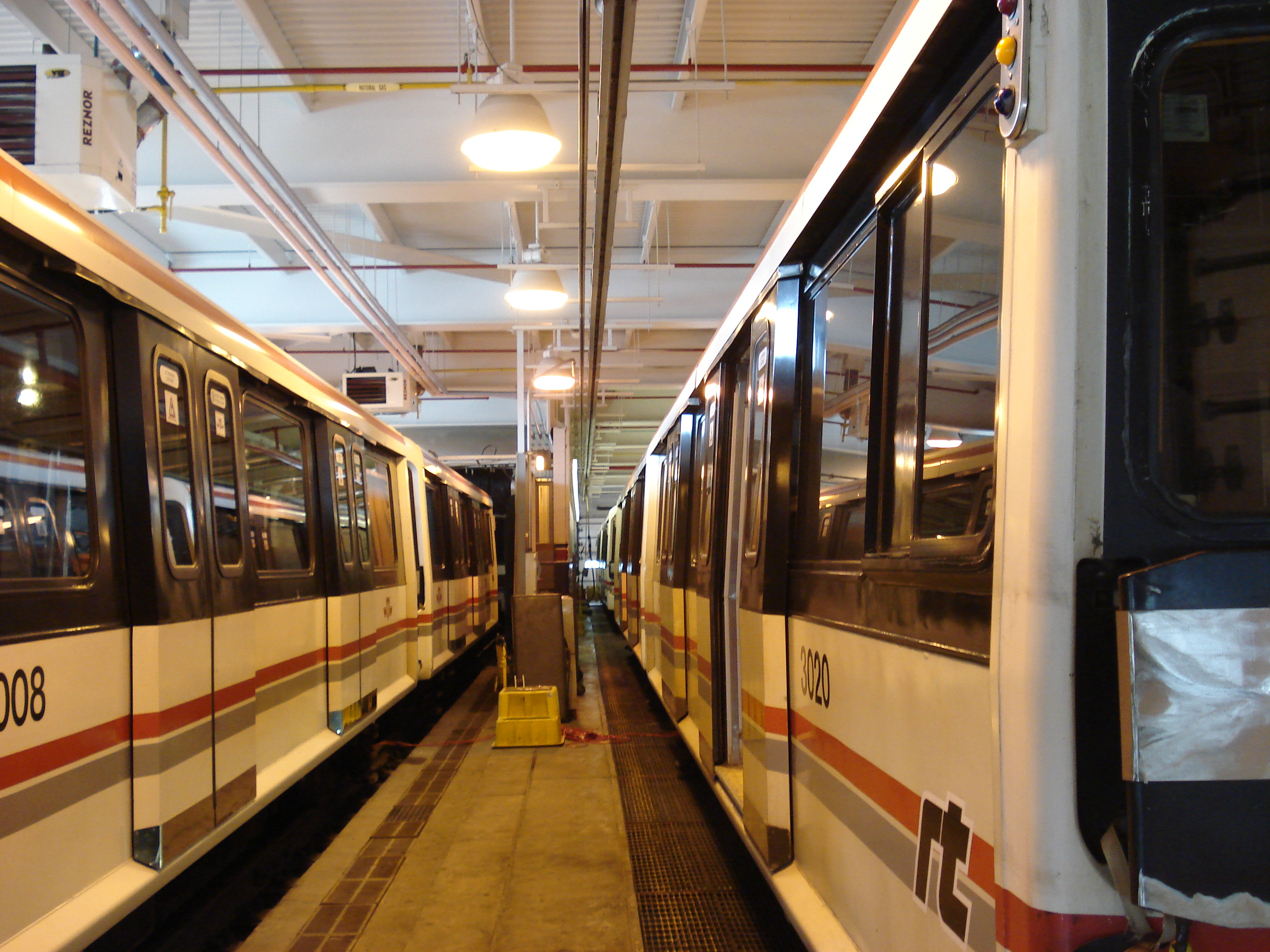
- Interior of the McCowan Carhouse
- Interactive map of McCowan Yard

Location
- Location: Scarborough, Toronto

Characteristics
- Operator: Toronto Transit Commission
- Rolling stock: S series

History
- Opened: March 23, 1985; 41 years ago
- Closed: July 24, 2023; 3 years ago

McCowan Yard is an inactive rail yard on the Toronto Transit Commission's (TTC's) Line 3 Scarborough of the Toronto subway system. Line 3 permanently closed following a derailment on July 24, 2023.

== Facilities ==
McCowan Yard is situated on a 4.5-acre (1.8 ha) site located east of McCowan Station, the eastern terminal of the former Line 3. The yard's street entrance is at 1720 Ellesmere Road, Scarborough, Toronto.

The yard provided facilities for the storage, cleaning, and maintenance of the 28 Intermediate Capacity Transit System (ICTS) vehicles used on Line 3 Scarborough. The yard employed a staff of 40.

The yard had a carhouse made of prefabricated metal designed by the TTC's Engineering and Construction Department. The carhouse contained one wash track and two repair/maintenance tracks. Outside, there were four storage tracks for passenger vehicles and a turning loop of 70 ft (21 m) radius was used to store work vehicles. The yard also had a power substation.

McCowan Carhouse was limited to light repairs and maintenance. Major maintenance work had to be performed at the Greenwood Yard shop. Because of gauge and technology differences, ICTS cars had to be transported by truck between the McCowan and Greenwood yards.

== Future ==
McCowan Yard was to have been a temporary facility pending an expansion of the line to Malvern. However, the City of Toronto has decided to replace Line 3 with an extension of Line 2 Bloor–Danforth estimated to open in 2030. With the closure of Line 3 in 2023, McCowan Yard was shut down and decommissioned. As of 2026, the TTC announced that the McCowan Yard will be demolished in order to construct a new operations building. Demolition of the facility is expected to start in June 2026.
