= Line 3 Scarborough =

Defunct light rapid transit line in Toronto, Canada

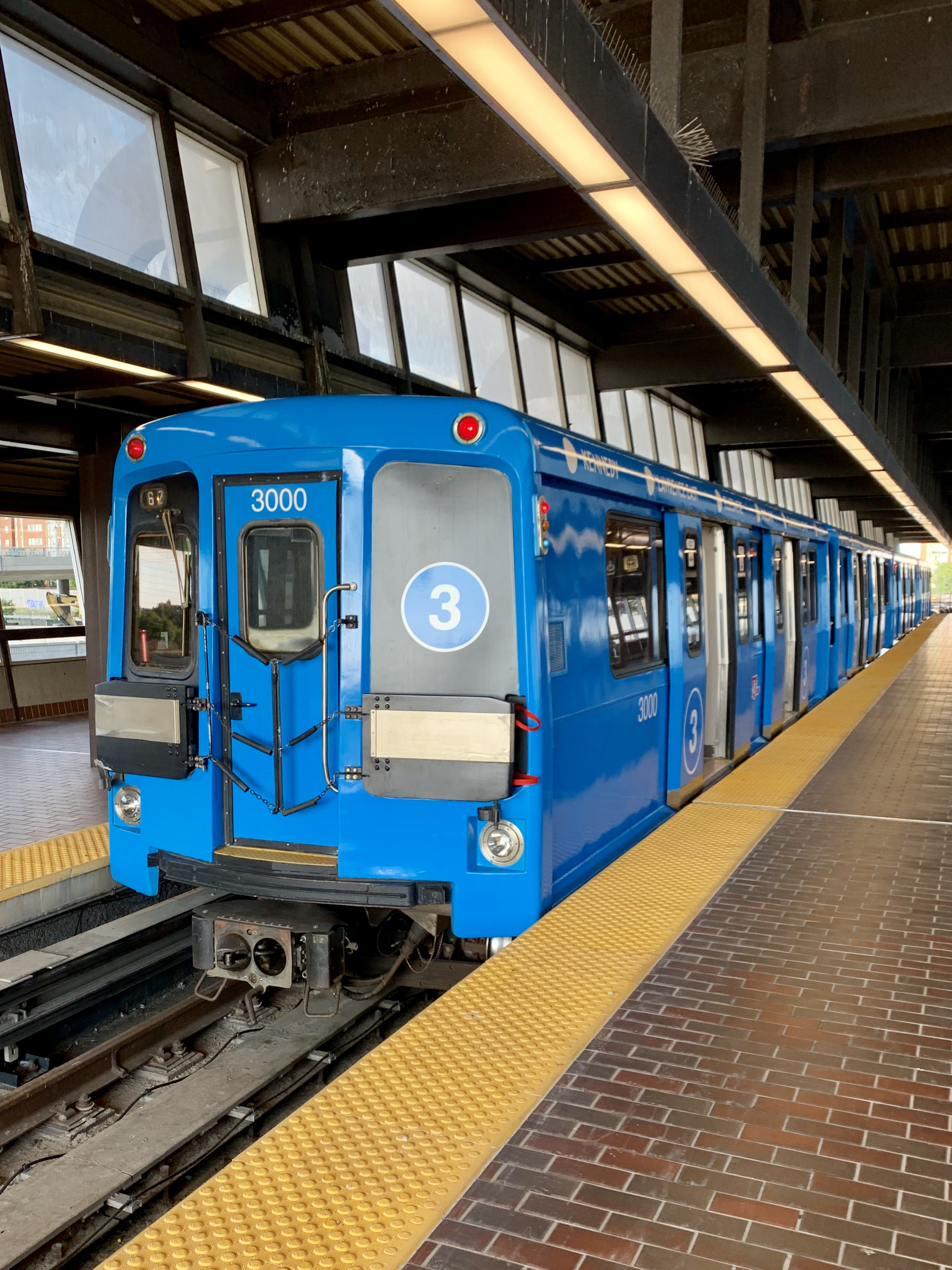
- An S-series train at the Line 3 platform of Kennedy station

Overview
- Status: Defunct
- Owner: Municipality of Metropolitan Toronto (1985–1998); City of Toronto (1998–2023)
- Locale: Toronto, Ontario, Canada
- Termini: Kennedy; McCowan
- Stations: 6
- Website: Official route page

Service
- Type: Light rapid transit
- System: Toronto subway
- Operator: Toronto Transit Commission
- Depot: McCowan Yard
- Rolling stock: S series

History
- Opened: March 22, 1985; 41 years ago
- Closed: July 24, 2023; 3 years ago

Technical
- Line length: 6.4 km (4.0 mi)
- Track gauge: 1,435 mm (4 ft 8 1/2 in) standard gauge
- Electrification: 600 V DC fifth rail
- Signalling: Thales SelTrac CBTC
Route map
Line 3 Scarborough highlighted in blue

Line 3 Scarborough, originally known as the Scarborough RT (SRT), was a medium-capacity rapid transit line that was part of the Toronto subway system of the Toronto Transit Commission in Toronto, Ontario, Canada. The line ran entirely within the eastern district of Scarborough, encompassing six stations and 6.4 kilometres (4.0 mi) of mostly elevated guideway track. It was connected with Line 2 Bloor–Danforth at its southwestern terminus, Kennedy, and terminated in the northeast at McCowan. Until its closure in July 2023, the system had a ridership of 4,720,000 passengers per year.

The rolling stock of Line 3 consisted of smaller, semi-automated, medium-capacity trains, rather than the larger heavy-rail subway trains used on Lines 1 and 2 in the system. Designated by the Toronto Transit Commission (TTC) as the S series, these were Intermediate Capacity Transit System (ICTS) Mark I trains built by the Urban Transportation Development Corporation (UTDC). The trains were powered by linear induction motors and operated on 1,435 mm (4 ft 8 1/2 in) standard gauge tracks, unlike the heavy-rail subway lines and the Toronto streetcar system, which use the unique 1,495 mm (4 ft 10 7/8 in) Toronto gauge.

The line remained mostly unchanged from its opening in 1985 until its closure in 2023 and contained two of the least-used stations in the system. Beginning in the late 2000s, Toronto City Council debated over competing plans to revitalize and expand the line, to convert its right-of-way for use by modern light rail vehicles, or to close the line and extend Line 2 Bloor–Danforth farther into Scarborough along a different route. In 2013, the council decided on a three-station extension of Line 2 to replace Line 3 along a different route. In 2016, in order to free up funds for another transit project, the city reduced the extension to include only one station, which was set to be completed by 2026. In 2019, Progressive Conservative premier Doug Ford reinstated the three-station Scarborough subway extension and committed to completing it by 2030, with all construction costs to be borne by the province.

The TTC planned for Line 3 to cease operations in November 2023, with shuttle buses running in place of Line 3 train service until the Line 2 Bloor–Danforth subway extension to the existing Scarborough Centre station opened for service, which was estimated to be in 2030. However, a train derailment in July 2023 resulted in the line permanently closing four months ahead of schedule. By March 2023, a plan existed to convert a portion of the existing right-of-way between Kennedy and Ellesmere stations into a bus right-of-way known as the Scarborough busway, including an additional stop at Mooregate Avenue / Tara Avenue, located near a pedestrian bridge that spans over the former Line 3 and GO Transit's Stouffville line between Eglinton Avenue and Lawrence Avenue. In 2023, the busway was targeted for completion by 2025.

== Name ==
From when the line opened in 1985 until 2015, it was known as the Scarborough RT or SRT. The "RT" in Scarborough RT stood for "rapid transit". The name Scarborough Line was used on the official TTC website and 2014 TTC Ride Guide. In October 2013, the TTC announced plans to give the lines official numbers to help riders and visitors to navigate the system. The line was numbered 3, as it was the third rapid transit line to open in the system. New signage was installed in March 2014. In 2015, the name was simplified to Line 3 Scarborough.

== History ==
The original Scarborough RT logo (1985–2015)

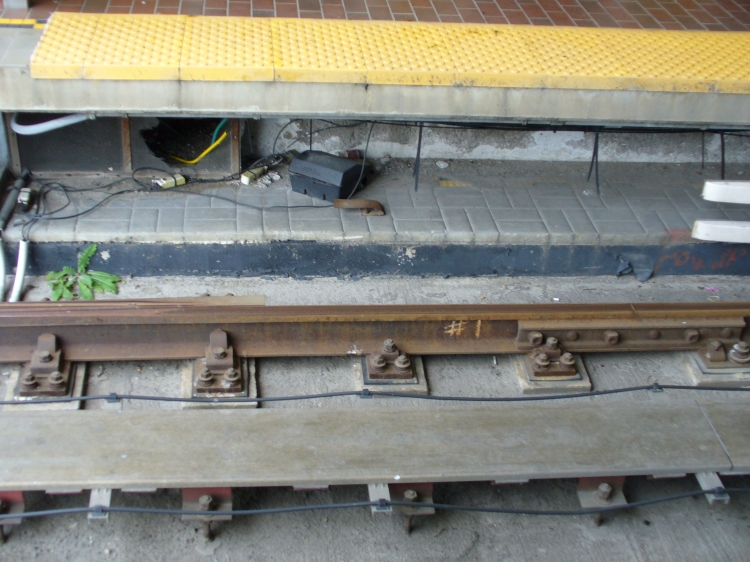
The original tiled streetcar platform can be seen at Kennedy station. This image also clearly shows the reaction rail for the linear motor between the rails, and the two inductive communications wires on either side of the plate.

=== Proposal and construction ===
In 1972, the Government of Ontario announced the GO-Urban plan to build an intermediate capacity transit system across suburban Toronto, particularly in Scarborough and Etobicoke, using the experimental Krauss-Maffei Transurban. However, KraussMaffei was forced to abandon development when the West German federal government declined further funding. GO-Urban then used some of the technologies from the Transurban to develop a simpler steel-wheeled version, the ICTS system.

During this period, the TTC had been working on plans to extend its own network with a series of streetcar systems using a new and greatly enlarged streetcar design, the Canadian Light Rail Vehicle (CLRV). The Ontario government, in charge of GO Transit, was looking for a test site for the ICTS system and demanded that the TTC use it for one of their planned streetcar projects, selecting the Scarborough extension. The TTC initially refused to make the change, arguing it was both the wrong solution and that since the construction of the line had already commenced this would be a waste of money. However, as the Ontario government was providing 75 percent of the funding for the line, they changed their minds when the government threatened to cut the funding.

At Kennedy station, there are clues revealing that it was originally built for streetcar operation; it is possible to see old low-level streetcar platforms protruding under the current high-level platforms, and the loop to turn streetcars proved too sharp for safe operation of the ICTS cars, which did not have a reason to turn around, so the loop was replaced by a single-track Spanish solution-like crossover. Ontario wanted to develop and promote its new technology, which had been designed for a proposed GO Transit urban service known as GO-ALRT, first proposed in 1982. Changes to federal railway regulations had made the new system unnecessary for GO, so the government hoped to sell it to other transit services in order to recoup its investment.

=== Opening and service ===
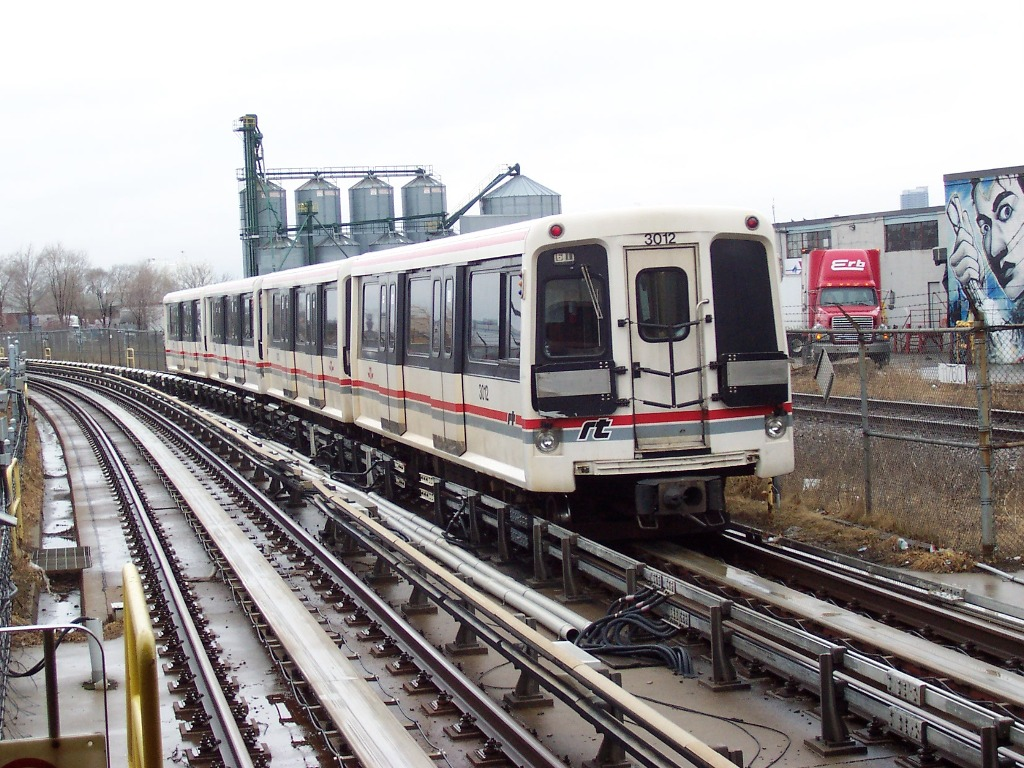
An S-series train in its original (1985–2015) livery in 2006

The Scarborough line was formally opened (as the Scarborough RT) to invited guests on March 22, 1985, and began revenue service on March 24, 1985. Three years after it opened, the TTC renovated its southwestern terminus at Kennedy station because the looped turnaround track, designed for uni-directional streetcars under the earlier plan and not needed for the bi-directional ICTS trains, was causing derailments; it was replaced with a single terminal track and the station was thus quasi-Spanish solution, with one side for boarding and another side for alighting, though the boarding side was also used for alighting during off-peak hours, weekends and holidays.

When the line was approaching the end of its useful life, the TTC reduced the frequency of service in mid-September 2012 to reduce wear and tear on both the aging rolling stock and the infrastructure.

In 2015, the TTC started work on the cars to keep them operational until the line could be replaced by another mode of rail technology. This included shrink-wrapping the rolling stock with a blue vinyl finish to emphasize the line's colour and displaying the number 3, a linear diagram of the Scarborough line, and the TTC logo. The original "RT" logo was no longer featured on the trains, except when the Line 3 shrink wrap was removed but not re-applied yet. These were followed by interior upgrades, such as using coloured velour seating.

On December 13, 2016, Presto fare gates were installed at Lawrence East station, making all stations along this line Presto-enabled.

On April 18, 2017, the TTC awarded a $6.8-million contract to Bombardier to repair corrosion damage under the floors of the S-series cars. If the problem were not rectified, there would be the risk of serious structural damage to the cars. That would have prevented the cars from lasting until 2026 when the Scarborough subway extension was originally scheduled to replace Line 3. The repair work required service to be reduced from 6 four-car trains down to 5.

=== Closure ===
On July 24, 2023, the last car of a train on Line 3 Scarborough (car 3001) derailed south of Ellesmere station. There were 45 people on board, with five injuries reported. The TTC closed the line while the cause of the incident was being investigated. Although the investigation and closure was expected to last several weeks, the city accelerated work to support the replacement buses. On August 24, 2023, the TTC announced that the line would not reopen ahead of the planned November closure. In late September 2023, the TTC explained that bolts that held the linear induction rail to the roadbed had come loose in the July incident, causing the magnetically attracted induction rail to rise up, strike and derail the last car of the train. This was due to lack of maintenance on the line because of the upcoming closure.

Immediately following the derailment, replacement bus service was implemented initially by shuttle buses serving the closed stations along Line 3. On September 3, 2023, the TTC replaced the shuttle bus service with route 903 Kennedy–Scarborough Centre Express, running northbound on Kennedy Road and southbound on Midland Avenue in reserved lanes between Kennedy and Scarborough Centre stations. Unlike the shuttle service, route 903 did not serve the closed Lawrence East, Ellesmere, Midland and McCowan stations. On November 19, 2023, the TTC extended eight bus routes from Scarborough Centre to Kennedy station, eliminating the need to transfer to route 903 at Scarborough Centre station.

On November 30, 2023, the consulting firm Systra submitted a report to the TTC, which found that, prior to the derailment, maintenance procedures on Line 3 were weak or non-existent and that track inspection staff lacked experience to understand how various defects could create an operating risk.

On October 4, 2024, EllisDon began work to demolish and remove the Line 3 train tracks between Eglinton Avenue and the north end of Ellesmere station in preparation for constructing a busway parallel to the Stouffville line.

On September 30, 2026, the Scarborough busway opened, running between Kennedy station and Ellesmere station on the line's former right-of-way

=== Farewell event ===
A farewell event for Line 3 was hosted at Scarborough Centre station on September 23, 2023, two months after the line's closure. The event featured trains, complimentary food and beverages, a photo area, and posters depicting archival photos and trivia, and it was free to attend.

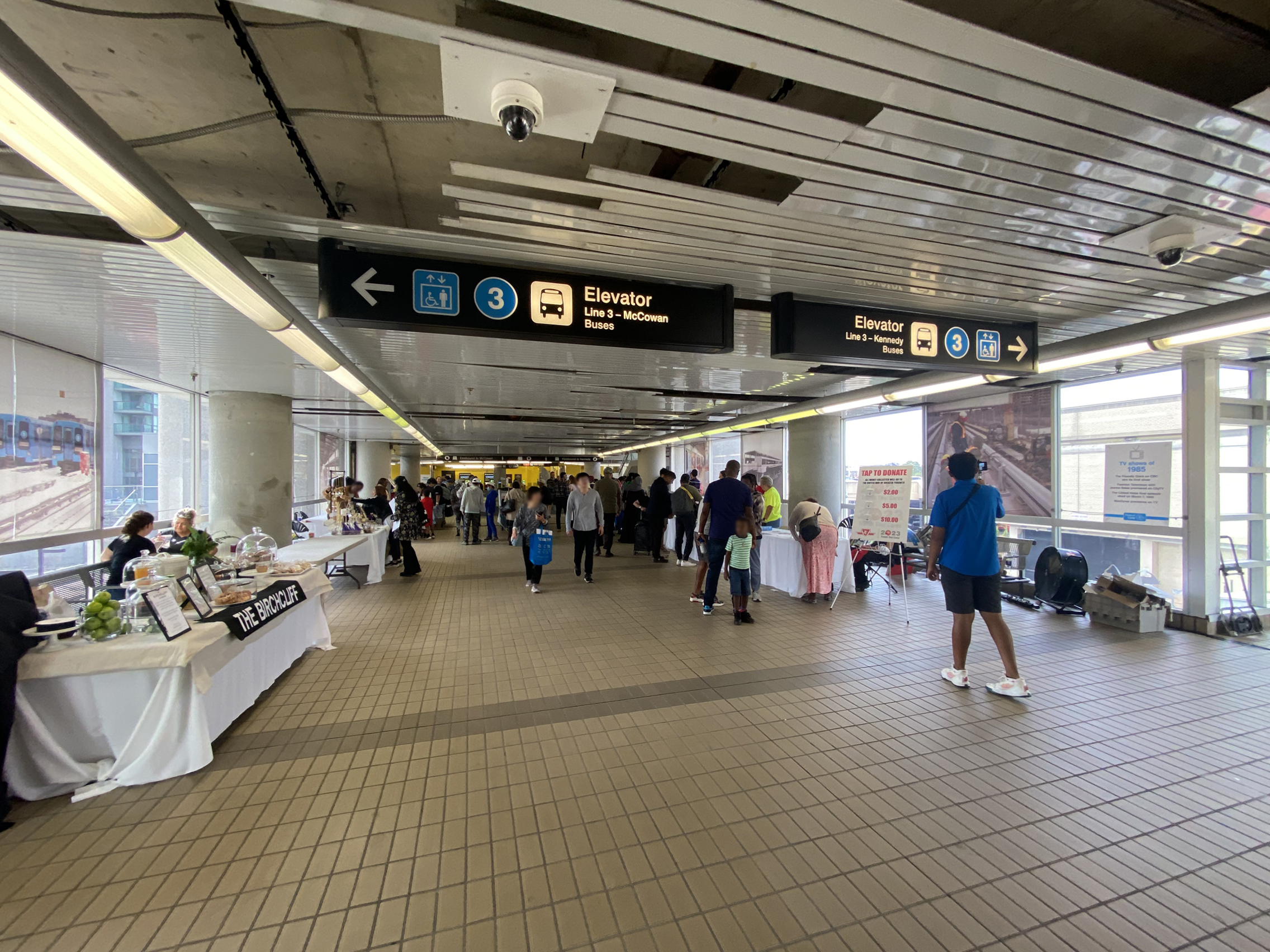
Farewell Line 3 booth in Scarborough Centre station concourse

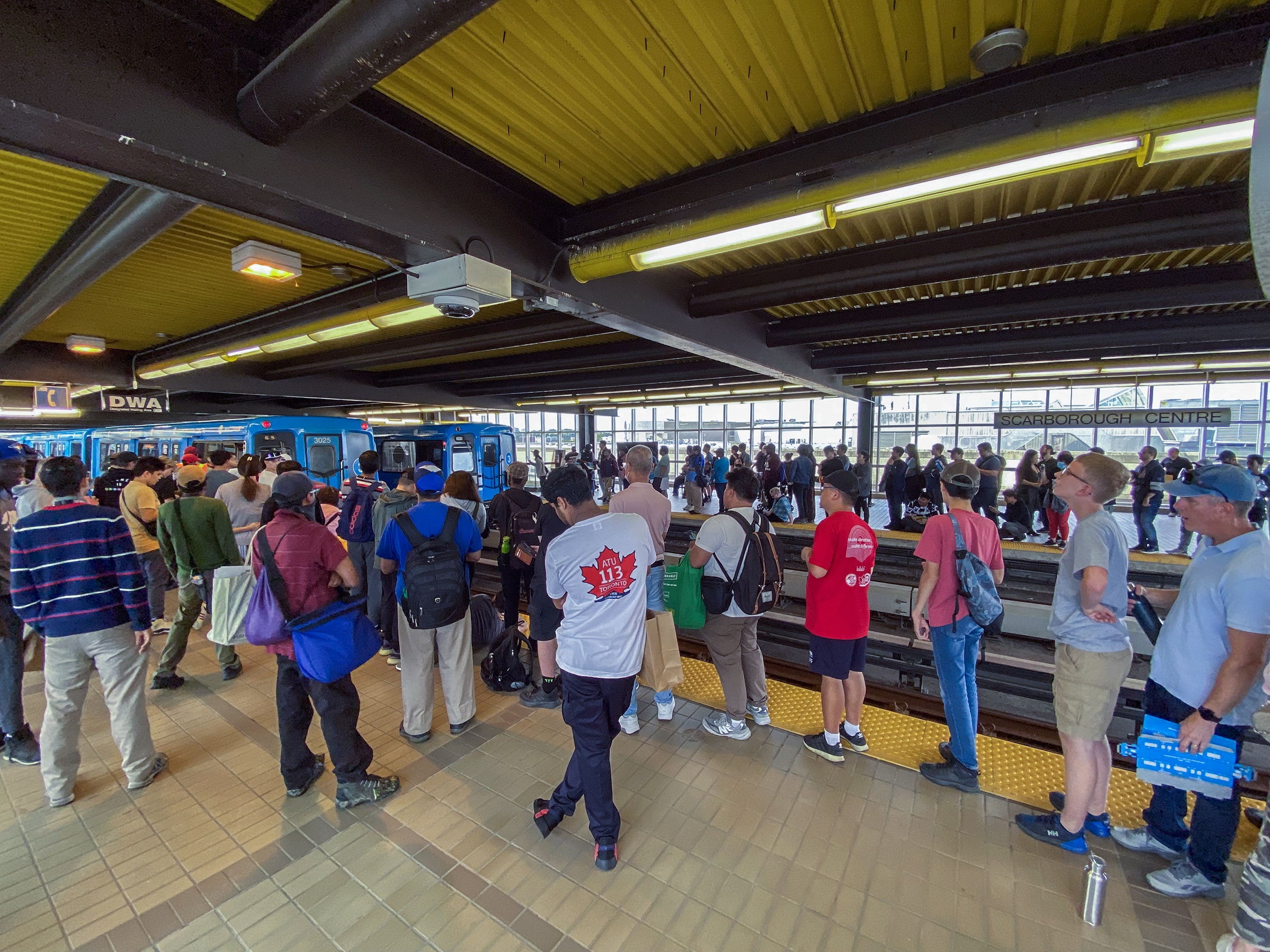
People taking photos during the Farewell Line 3 event on September 23, 2023

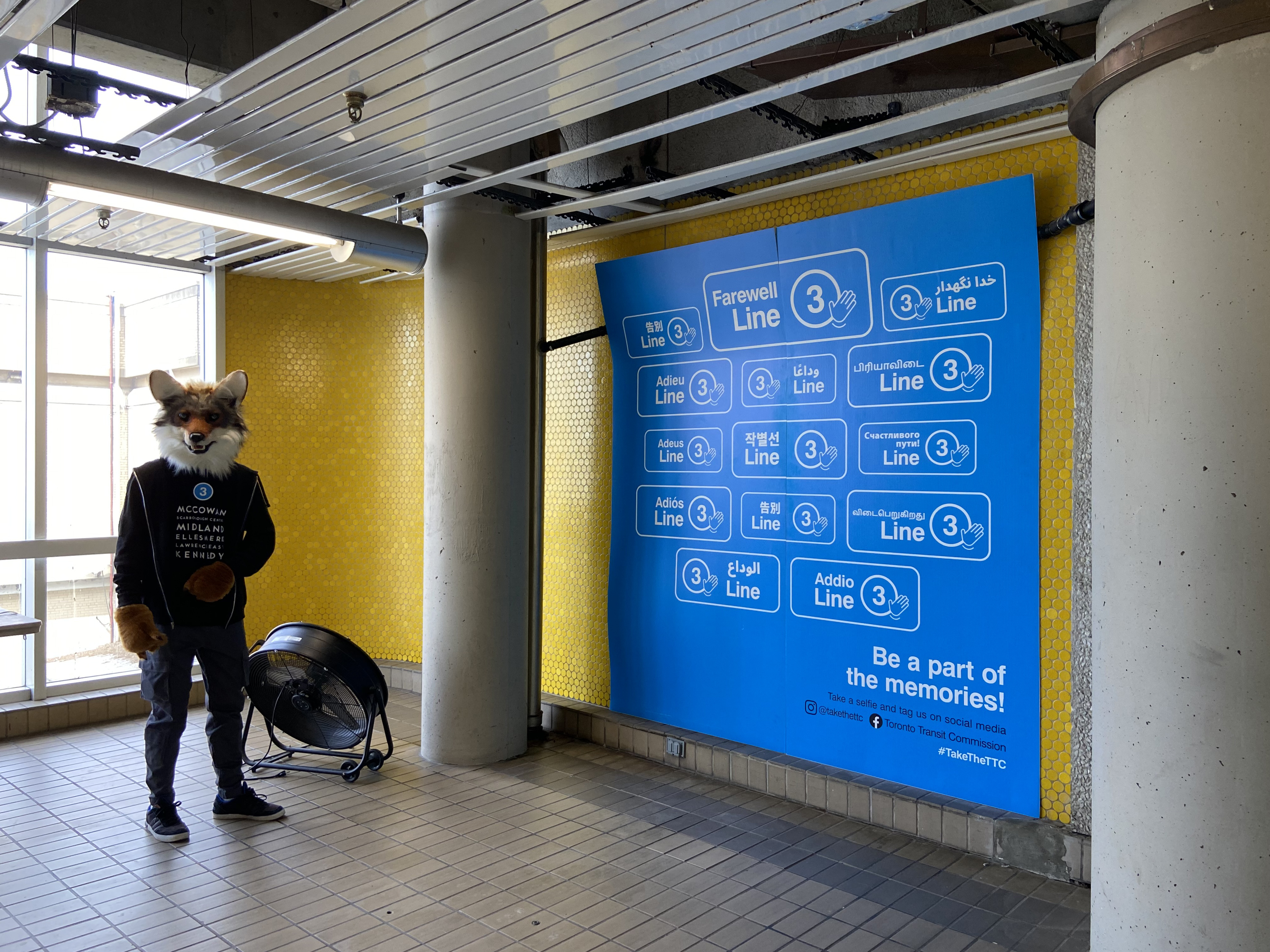
Photo area in Scarborough Centre Station with a blue backdrop reading "Farewell Line 3" in various languages, as well as social media handles for Meta-owned social websites and the hashtag #TakeTheTTC

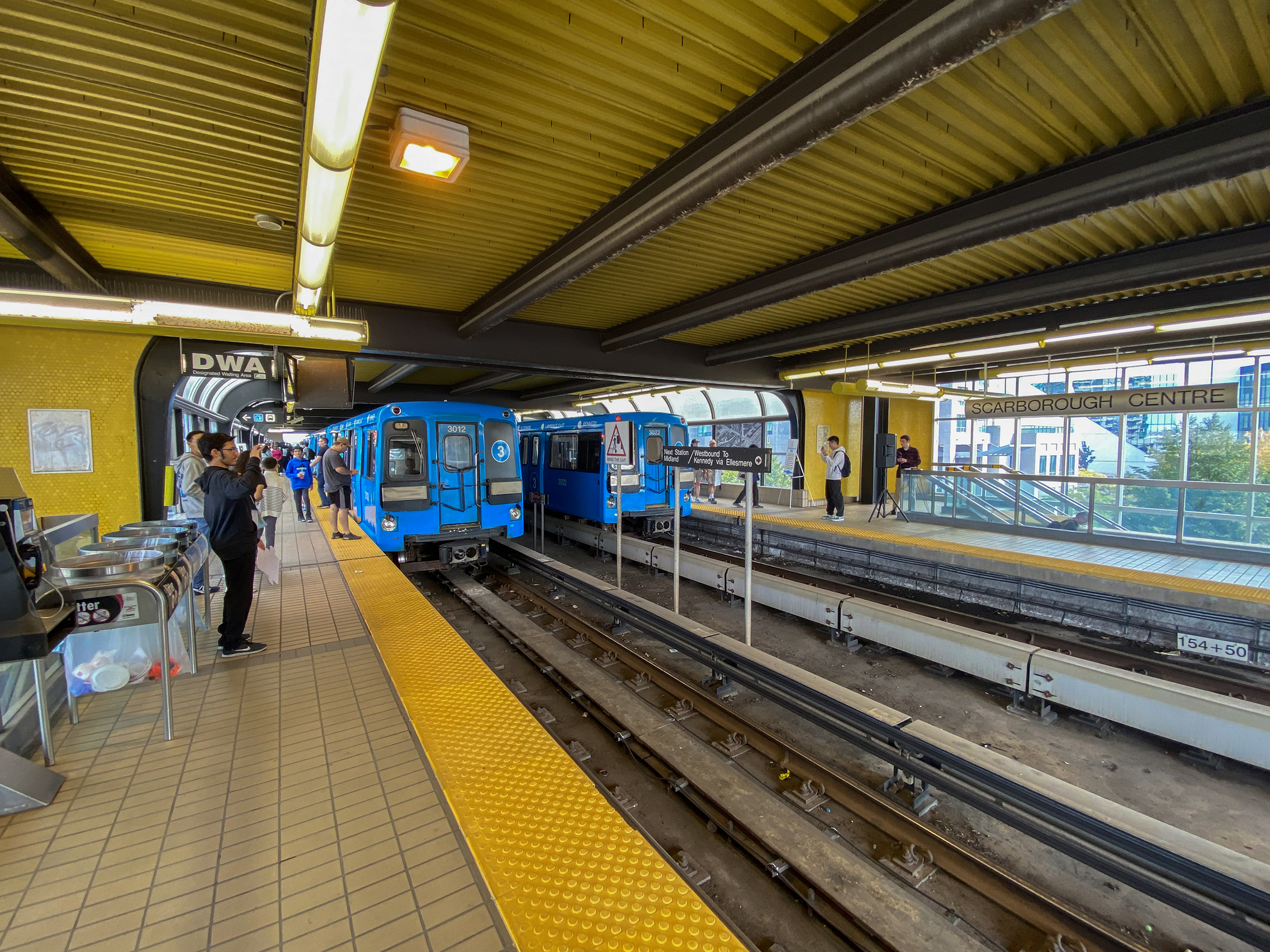
Two S-series trains stationed at each of the platforms during the farewell event

== Rolling stock ==
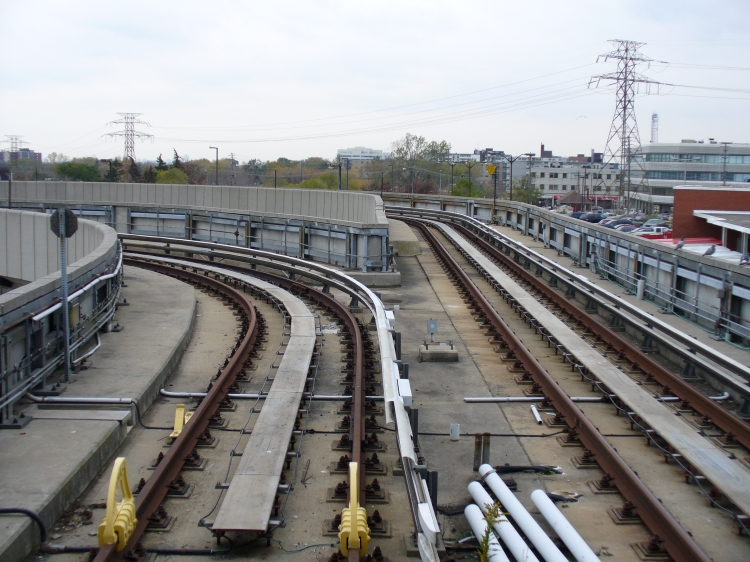
The abandoned loop at Kennedy station, which became a dead-end tail track in 1988

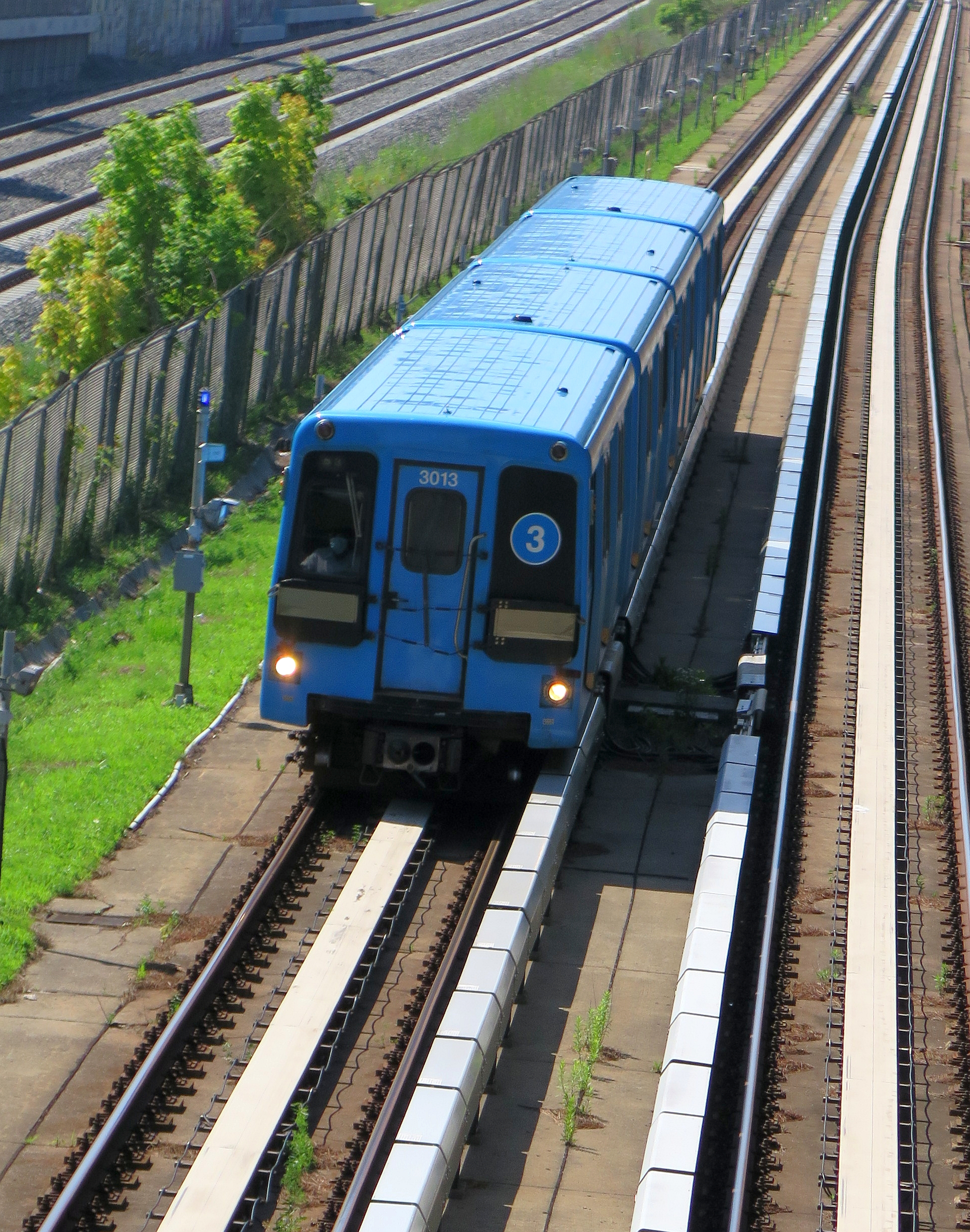
S-series train heading north toward Lawrence East station, 2021

The 7 four-car trains used exclusively on the Scarborough line were developed by the Urban Transportation Development Corporation (UTDC), then an Ontario Crown corporation but later sold to Bombardier Transportation. The business proposal initially bore little fruit—a proposed pilot project in Hamilton was cancelled after meeting widespread public opposition, and the only other transit systems to use the technology, named the Intermediate Capacity Transit System (ICTS), at the time were Vancouver's SkyTrain and the People Mover in Detroit. After Bombardier took over UTDC, it redesigned the technology with newer, longer cars, used to expand the SkyTrain network and also for new installations across the world. ICTS was rebranded as "Advanced Rapid Transit" (ART) and became a success for the company. Later, the technology was again rebranded, this time as Innovia Metro.

One unusual feature of the ICTS cars was that they were driven by linear induction motors: instead of using conventional motors to turn the wheels, they pushed themselves along the route using alternating flat magnets reacting with the distinctive diamagnetic aluminum metal plate that ran down the centre of the tracks. This system required very few moving parts and therefore led to lower maintenance costs. When the car motors were accelerating, they actually lifted the car off the track an extremely small distance, repelling against the aluminum plate. This micro-lifting prevented the truck wheels from making a solid electrical contact with the track. Instead of using the conventional method, in which motive power is supplied by a single third rail, with return current travelling through the running rails, a separate positive- and negative-power rail were provided on one side of the track. The linear induction motors also allowed the cars to climb steeper grades than would be possible with traditional subway technology since wheel slip was not an issue.

The trains were also able to be operated exclusively by computers, becoming one of the earliest installations of Standard Elektrik Lorenz's "SelTrac IS" system (now owned and delivered by Thales Rail Signalling Solutions), doing away with the need for a human operator. However, due to opposition from the transit workers' union and public perception, operators were retained; the union has firmly opposed driverless trains. (Other systems took full advantage of the automated operation and Vancouver's SkyTrain has been automated since 1985 without incident.) The Line 3 trains had only one operator since inception. In practice, the Scarborough line trains drove themselves; the operator monitored their operations and controlled the doors. One of the features that was not implemented at the time of Scarborough line's opening was the automated audible-only next-stop announcement system, which was introduced in January 2008 and meant operators were no longer required to announce stops manually. These announcements feature the voice of Susan Bigioni, a TTC employee, who also voiced the announcements for the T1 series and the retired H4, H5, and H6 trains.

In June 2024, the Detroit People Mover transit system announced the purchase of 12 Mark I trainsets (24 railcars) and equipment from Line 3. Their transportation to and integration with the Detroit People Mover was projected to take over a year and a half. The purchase would replace the system's existing train sets with upgraded features, along with providing much-needed parts needed to keep the system functional. Two railcars were sent to the Halton County Radial Railway Museum for preservation. One car (car 3008) would be provided to the Toronto Zoo in Scarborough to be used as a heritage exhibit adjacent to a Zoomobile station.

== Track ==
Line 3 used 5-rail track, which a TTC document describes as follows:

Track is the 5 rail system on direct fixation and car is powered by an induction or "reaction rail" situated between the running rails at the same top of rail elevation. There are two side contacting power rails +300V and −300V respectively situated a distance of about 14 in. from the closest gauge line of one running rail.

The two power rails of 300 volts positive DC and the other of 300 volts negative DC together produced 600 volts.

Line 3 tracks used standard gauge rather than the broader Toronto gauge used on the system's other heavy-rail lines and the city's streetcar system, as the ICTS design for the line would not allow for the interchange of rail equipment between lines 2 and 3 even if they were both the same gauge.

== Route ==
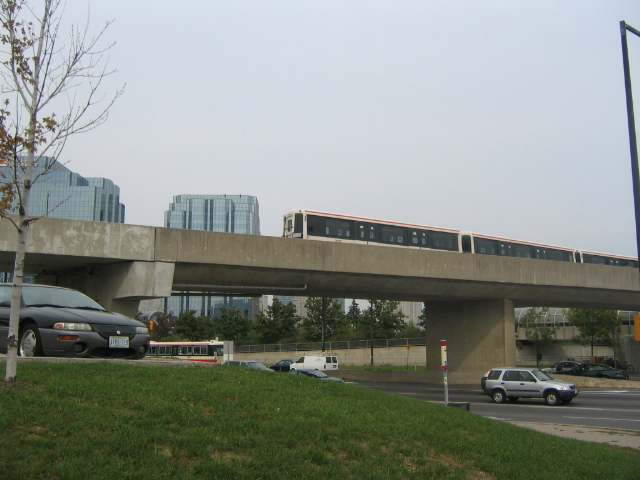
The S-series train on its elevated tracks over McCowan Road between Scarborough Centre and McCowan stations in September 2005

The line followed a roughly inverted L-shaped route when viewed northwards: first from Kennedy station, paralleling the Canadian National Railway / GO Transit's Stouffville line tracks, between Kennedy Road and Midland Avenue, 4 kilometres (2.5 mi) to Ellesmere Road; then eastward between Ellesmere Road and Progress Avenue, through Scarborough City Centre to McCowan Road. The north–south section of the route, where it followed the Stouffville line tracks, was at ground level; the shorter east–west section (except for the ground-level yard) was elevated, as was the Kennedy terminus. The line dove briefly underground just north of Ellesmere station to cross under the Stouffville line tracks. After that, it was elevated towards McCowan station. Two stations, Kennedy and Scarborough Centre, were the only stations on the line to have accessible elevators as those two were the busiest stations on Line 3.

From 2 a.m. to 6 a.m. (to 8 a.m. on Sundays), when Line 3 was not operating, the 316 Kingston Rd-McCowan Blue Night bus served the same area. The 316 originates at Bingham Loop, where it connects with the 322 Coxwell bus that travelled to the west, as well as Route 324 Victoria Park that runs north. From the loop, Route 316 travels east along Kingston Road to Brimley Road, then north along Brimley Road to Danforth Road, then north on McCowan Road to Steeles Avenue. With the exception of McCowan station, it does not pass near any of the rapid transit stations, though other night bus services pass near stations. Bus service was extended on Sundays because the rapid transit lines started at 8 a.m. (beginning January 3, 2016) instead of the usual 6 a.m. start. Service frequency was 30 minutes. Route 316 continues to operate after the line's closure.

The frequency for this line was 4 to 5 minutes during peak periods and 5 to 6 minutes during off-peak periods.

== Operations ==
The TTC operated five to six trains on the line with each train consisting of four cars. There were 28 cars in the Line 3 fleet.

Line 3 trains could switch directions only at the ends of the line as there were no intermediate crossovers between the two termini. Thus, there were no short turns on Line 3.

In winter, during heavy snow or freezing rain, the TTC previously ran "storm trains" overnight on Line 3 to keep power rails clear of ice, and apply anti-freeze to the power rail once freezing rain starts. However, since the winter of 2018–2019, the TTC decided to change its procedures for Line 3. Thus, about two hours before an expected storm, the TTC may have decided to shut down Line 3 and replace it with bus service. Just before the storm of February 2, 2022, the TTC replaced all Line 3 trains with 25 buses.

The Scarborough line's S-series ICTS trains were stored and serviced at the small McCowan Yard, located east of McCowan station. Basic maintenance was performed in this yard; for more extensive work, the cars were taken to Line 2's Greenwood Yard by truck, given the train's different track gauge and propulsion system.

== Future ==
After studying the revitalization and expansion of Line 3 in 2006, its replacement with alternate transit (light rail versus subway) became a subject of debate in the late 2000s. As of April 2019, there were plans to replace Line 3 with the three-stop Scarborough subway extension of Line 2 from Kennedy station to Sheppard Avenue, with intermediate stops at Lawrence Avenue and Scarborough Town Centre. With an estimated completion between 2029 and 2030, the extension would follow a different route than Line 3. The Government of Ontario has committed to fully fund its $5.5-billion cost. In February 2021, the TTC recommended closing Line 3 permanently by 2023 and replacing it with bus service until the Line 2 extension opens. Once Line 3 was closed, portions of its right-of-way could be converted into parkland.

=== Revitalization and expansion ===
In 2006, a study was completed on the prospects of the Scarborough line. It recommended upgrading the line to handle larger Innovia Metro Mark II vehicles, at a cost of $190 million (in 2006 dollars) with an eight-month service suspension for the upgrade and to purchase $170 million of new rolling stock. Rebuilding the curve in the tunnel north of Ellesmere station would have been required to accommodate Mark II cars. (According to transit advocate Steve Munro, the need to rebuild the tunnel was discovered after the $190 million upgrade estimate was made.) The TTC board approved the recommended plan for the upgrades on August 30, 2006, but later cancelled the plans. Extending Line 2 Bloor–Danforth, either along the current route or along a different alignment directly to Scarborough Centre station, was not considered cost-effective or justifiable.

In November 2015, transportation consultant and University of Toronto professor emeritus Richard Soberman argued that it would be vastly cheaper and faster to buy new Line 3 vehicles than to replace Line 3 with an extension of Line 2 northeast from Kennedy station. He felt the cost savings would be great enough to overcome difficulties such as the incompatibility of Mark II cars with the existing line geometry and the extra cost of building a fully separated right-of-way to Sheppard Avenue, where Line 3 could connect with either a proposed extension of Line 4 Sheppard or the Sheppard East LRT.

=== Replacement with alternate transit ===
Superimposed former Line 3 (grey) and the under-construction Line 2 Bloor–Danforth extension (dark green) with connection to Line 5

The TTC and the City of Toronto completed an environmental assessment in 2010 to convert the line to light rail transit and extend it to Malvern from its current eastern terminus, McCowan, with potential new intermediate stations at Bellamy Road, Centennial College's Progress Campus and Sheppard Avenue with a possible additional station at Brimley Road between the existing Midland and Scarborough Centre stations.

After initially planning to include the line with the proposed Eglinton Crosstown LRT line and create a single line called the "Eglinton–Scarborough Crosstown line", Metrolinx proceeded with plans to convert the line to light rail and extend it to Sheppard Avenue with a single new intermediate station at Centennial College. The existing line would have closed after the 2015 Pan American Games and be completed in 2020. In January 2013, Infrastructure Ontario issued a request for qualifications to shortlist companies to construct both this line and the Eglinton Crosstown line. The Eglinton Crosstown line was later renamed and numbered Line 5 Eglinton and officially given the colour of orange.

In June 2013, Toronto City Council again debated having the Scarborough line replaced with an extension of Line 2 Bloor–Danforth north to Sheppard Avenue along a different right of way. Metrolinx issued a letter to Toronto City Council indicating it would cease work on the Scarborough portion of the line, because its position strayed from the original LRT agreement. The subway alternative would cost between $500 million and $1 billion more than converting the Scarborough line to use the same rolling stock as the Eglinton Crosstown line be so it could be a continuation of that line. The Globe and Mail reported that Scarborough councillors had argued that providing Scarborough residents with light rail, not heavy rail, treated them as "second-class citizens".

Two competing subway plans were proposed to replace Line 3. TTC chair Karen Stintz proposed extending Line 2 Bloor–Danforth to the east before turning north, with three new stations at Lawrence Avenue and McCowan Road (primarily to serve the Scarborough Hospital's General Campus), at Scarborough Town Centre and then at Sheppard Avenue East and McCowan Road, where it would connect to the Sheppard East LRT. Transportation Minister Glen Murray made an alternative proposal to extend Line 2 along the Line 3 route but have it terminate at Scarborough Town Centre. Under the Murray plan, there would be only two stations and there would be no direct connection with the then-proposed Sheppard East LRT. The Murray plan would have required the relocation of Kennedy station as a new northbound curve from the existing Kennedy station would have been too tight for subway trains. It would also have required the complete shutdown of the line during construction, which the Stintz plan would have avoided.

On October 8, 2013, Toronto City Council voted 24–20 to replace the Scarborough line with a three-station extension of the Bloor–Danforth subway line. Council chose the Stintz plan for the extension.

In 2013, the rejected LRT proposal would have provided a 9.9-kilometre (6.2 mi) line with seven stops serving 47,000 residents within walking distance. The selected 3-stop subway extension would be 7.6 kilometres (4.7 mi) long, serving 14,000–20,000 residents within walking distance. In 2013, the LRT was estimated to cost $1.48 billion to build versus $3.56 billion for the Line 2 extension; both estimates would subsequently increase.

Converting Line 3 to light rail would have required the complete shutdown of the line while extending Line 2 could occur without requiring a Line 3 shutdown. Circa 2013, this was promoted as a major benefit of the Line 2 extension over a conversion to light rail. At the time, the TTC estimated it could keep Line 3 operating until 2026; however, in February 2021, the TTC recommended replacing Line 3 with buses, thus eliminating that benefit. A remaining benefit of the subway option was that it would eliminate the need to change trains at Kennedy station.

In June 2016, city planning staff proposed the elimination of two of the three stops along the planned Scarborough subway extension, which would have seen Line 2 Bloor–Danforth terminate at Scarborough Town Centre in order to free up funding for a proposed Crosstown East LRT line extension of Line 5 Eglinton. The eliminated intermediate stops were at Lawrence Avenue and Sheppard Avenue. Subsequently, the cost estimate for the one-stop subway extension increased to $3.2 billion, leaving the Crosstown East LRT unfunded. Given the rising cost for the subway extension and the loss of funding for the LRT line, a group of city councillors led by Josh Matlow reopened the subway versus LRT debate. Matlow proposed scrapping the one-stop subway extension in order to provide funding for 24 LRT stops on two LRT lines within Scarborough. TTC CEO Andy Byford said the cost of the LRT line following the Line 3 route may have risen to as high as $3 billion because of "delays and redesign" since 2013, but Brad Ross, also of the TTC, warned of "caveats around numbers and assumptions" associated with that estimate. After Council's vote, Byford admitted that the cost estimates for "delays" was unnecessary, which assumed the LRT's completion would be in 2026, the same date as the subway option. However, according to Michael Warren, a former TTC chief general manager, the LRT could have been completed in 2020 at a cost of $1.8 billion, an estimate not presented to City Council when it voted. There was also the issue of whether there would be space for both expanded GO service and an LRT north of Kennedy station; however, Metrolinx subsequently denied there would be such a problem. On July 13, Toronto City Council voted down Matlow's proposal by a margin of roughly 2 to 1.

Councillor Glenn De Baeremaeker justified the subway extension saying "Scarborough residents need the same access to a subway system that everybody else already has." Mayor Tory was concerned that switching from subway to LRT would delay transit improvements in Scarborough, and might not get support from senior levels of government. In September 2013, Metrolinx prepared a draft report comparing the subway and LRT options concluding that the subway option was "not a worthwhile use of money." Metrolinx had declined a TTC request to give an opinion prior to City Council's July 2016 vote.

In 2017, the estimated cost of the one-stop Line 2 extension was $3.35 billion, which increased to $3.9 billion by April 2019. On April 10, 2019, Premier Doug Ford announced that the province would revert the extension back to the three-stop proposal at an estimated cost of $5.5 billion with an estimated completion date between 2029 and 2030. Line 2 would also receive new subway trains as part of the extension to replace the existing T1-series trains.

Oxford Properties, the owners of Scarborough Town Centre, funded a pro-subway lobbying group in 2017 before distancing themselves over the controversy. They were accused of astroturfing, or pretending to be a citizens group. Town Centre was "supportive of the plan, believing it could turn the area into a mixed-use urban destination.

=== Replacement bus service ===
Scarborough busway

On April 10, 2019, Ontario premier Doug Ford announced that Line 3 Scarborough would be replaced by a three-stop extension of Line 2 Bloor–Danforth to be completed by 2030. However, on December 10, 2020, Toronto mayor John Tory stated that Line 3 was likely to fail and be taken out of service before the Scarborough subway extension was completed, possibly several years earlier. At that point, the Line 3 vehicles were 35 years old, a decade beyond their original 25-year design life, and had become increasingly unreliable and difficult to maintain. The TTC therefore began studying replacement bus service.

In February 2021, the TTC recommended permanently closing Line 3 in 2023 and replacing it with bus service. The TTC rejected a third overhaul of the line, which had an estimated cost of $522.4 million and was not expected to guarantee reliable operation. In April 2022, the TTC proposed converting approximately 4 kilometres (2.5 mi) of the Line 3 right-of-way between Kennedy station and the former Ellesmere station into a dedicated busway. Stops were proposed at Mooregate Avenue / Tara Avenue, Lawrence East and Ellesmere. Buses would leave the converted right-of-way at Ellesmere and continue using surface streets to Scarborough Centre station. The elevated portion of Line 3 serving Midland and McCowan station was not suitable for conversion to bus use.

By August 2023, newly elected mayor Olivia Chow had committed to constructing the busway, which was then estimated to cost $55 million and take approximately two years to complete.

Pending construction of the busway, the TTC planned interim transit-priority measures between Kennedy and Scarborough Centre. Dedicated red-painted bus lanes were installed primarily on Kennedy Road for northbound buses and Midland Avenue for southbound buses, together with transit-signal priority and other roadway changes. Bus-terminal capacity was also increased at Kennedy and Scarborough Centre stations, including construction of a temporary bus terminal at Kennedy.

The interim measures had originally been intended to be in place when Line 3 closed on November 19, 2023. However, after a Line 3 train derailed on July 24, 2023, the TTC ended train service permanently several months ahead of schedule and introduced emergency replacement buses in mixed traffic. The first reserved bus lanes entered service on August 26, 2023, before all of the planned transit-priority work had been completed.

The full interim replacement network began on November 19, 2023, with eight TTC bus routes extended from Scarborough Centre to Kennedy station. The arrangement eliminated the need for many passengers travelling from elsewhere in Scarborough to transfer at Scarborough Centre. With the transit-priority measures in place, the TTC estimated that trips between Kennedy and Scarborough Centre would take 17 to 22 minutes, compared with approximately 10 minutes on Line 3.

Work to convert the former Line 3 right-of-way began in August 2024 with removal of rails, power cables, signal equipment and other railway infrastructure between Kennedy and Ellesmere. This early work was completed in December 2024, along with detailed design of the busway. The Transit and Rail Project Assessment Process was also completed in December 2024. The main construction contract was awarded in 2025 and construction subsequently began. The total approved budget for the SRT Bus Replacement Infrastructure project, encompassing the replacement-bus infrastructure and busway program, was $93.8 million.

The busway was initially expected to be completed in 2027, but in December 2025, the TTC announced that construction would be accelerated to allow service to begin by the end of September 2026. On August 20, 2026, the TTC announced that revenue service would begin on September 30, 2026, more than six months earlier than the previous schedule.

The busway uses the former Line 3 right-of-way from Kennedy to Ellesmere, with intermediate stops at Tara Avenue / Mooregate Avenue and Lawrence East. From Ellesmere, buses use priority bus infrastructure on Ellesmere Road to reach Scarborough Centre and do not serve McCowan. The busway has a travel time of approximately 15 minutes between Kennedy and Scarborough Centre, up to seven minutes faster than the interim replacement service. More than 118,000 passengers per week are projected to use the busway. It opened for service on September 30, 2026.

The busway is primarily an interim rapid-transit service pending completion of the Scarborough subway extension. City planning documents have also contemplated retaining it after the subway opens as additional rapid-transit infrastructure in Scarborough.

=== Reuse of infrastructure ===
One of the TTC's redevelopment proposals for the Line 3 lands was to convert the corridor, including the elevated section between Midland and McCowan stations, into a linear park with a rail trail. This proposed park would be similar to the High Line in the New York City borough of Manhattan.

The Line 3 busway (on the former Line 3 right-of-way between Kennedy and Ellesmere stations parallel to the Stouffville line) is expected to remain in operation after the Scarborough subway extension opens to provide extra rapid transit service in the surrounding area.

== See also ==
- Toronto Zoo Domain Ride
- Transportation in Toronto
