= Kennedy station =

Intermodal transit terminal in Toronto, Canada

Kennedy
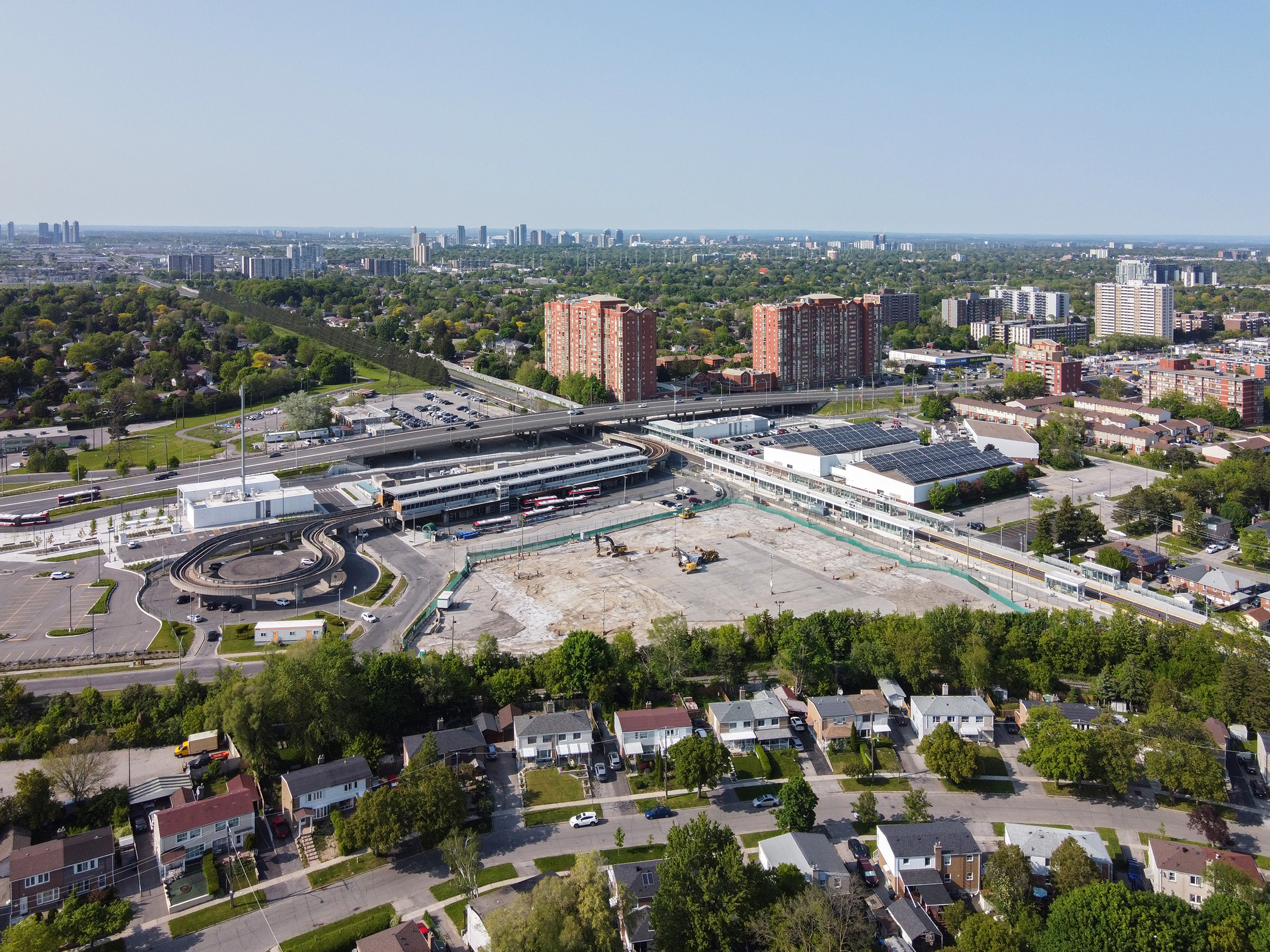
- Aerial view of Kennedy station in 2023

General information
- Location: 2455 Eglinton Avenue East; Toronto, Ontario; Canada
- Coordinates: 43°43′57″N 79°15′50″W
- Platforms: Centre platform (Lines 2 and 5); Side platform (Stouffville line)
- Tracks: 2 (Lines 2 and 5); 1 (Stouffville line)
- Connections: TTC buses: 12 Kingston Road; 20 Cliffside; 21 Brimley; 34 Eglinton; 38 Highland Creek; 43 Kennedy; 57 Midland; 86 Scarborough; 113 Danforth; 116 Morningside; 129 McCowan North; 131 Nugget; 133 Neilson; 154 Curran Hall; 201 Bluffer's Park; 300 Bloor–Danforth; 334 Eglinton; 343 Kennedy; 386 Scarborough; 903 Kennedy Stn–Scarborough Express; 904 Sheppard-Kennedy Express; 905 Eglinton East Express; 938 Highland Creek Express; 939 Finch Express; 943 Kennedy Express; 986 Scarborough Express

Construction
- Structure type: Underground (Lines 2 and 5); At-grade (Stouffville line)
- Platform levels: 3
- Accessible: Yes
- Architect: Arcadis (Line 5)

Other information
- Station code: GO Transit: KE
- Fare zone: 77 (GO Transit)
- Website: TTC station page; GO Transit station page

History
- Opened: Line 2: November 21, 1980; 45 years ago; Line 3: March 22, 1985; 41 years ago; Line 5: February 8, 2026; 9 months ago; Stouffville line: June 2, 2005; 21 years ago
- Closed: Line 3: July 24, 2023; 3 years ago
- Rebuilt: 2026 (Line 2 and Stouffville line)

Passengers
- 2023–2024 2018: 42,881 (TTC); 50,000 (GO Transit) ▲28.2%
- Rank: 9 of 70 (TTC)

Services
| Preceding station | Toronto Transit Commission | Following station |
|---|---|---|
| Warden towards Kipling | Line 2 Bloor–Danforth | Terminus |
| Ionview towards Mount Dennis | Line 5 Eglinton | Terminus |
| Preceding station | GO Transit | Following station |
| Union Terminus | Stouffville | Agincourt towards Old Elm |
Future services
| Preceding station | Toronto Transit Commission | Following station |
|---|---|---|
| Warden towards Kipling | Scarborough extension (opens 2033) | Lawrence East (future) towards Sheppard/McCowan |
| Preceding station | GO Transit | Following station |
| East Harbour Opening 2028 towards Union | Stouffville | Agincourt towards Old Elm |
Former services
| Preceding station | Toronto Transit Commission | Following station |
|---|---|---|
| Terminus | Line 3 Scarborough | Lawrence East towards McCowan |
Track layout
Location

Kennedy station is an intermodal transit terminal in Toronto, Ontario, Canada. It is the eastern terminus for both Line 2 Bloor–Danforth and Line 5 Eglinton of the Toronto subway system, as well as a stop on GO Transit's Stouffville line. Opened in 1980, it is located east of the Kennedy Road and Eglinton Avenue intersection. It is the fifth busiest station in the Toronto subway system, after Bloor–Yonge, St. George, Sheppard–Yonge, and Union, serving a total of approximately 42,881 customer trips a day.

It was built as part of the extensions of Line 2 west to Kipling and east to this station. The station's main complex has four floors with wheelchair accessible entrances. On the ground level is the bus terminal, surrounded by ten platforms that serve 16 Toronto Transit Commission (TTC) bus routes, as well as the Stouffville line platform. Wi-Fi service is available at this station.

Kennedy station was previously the southern terminus of Line 3 Scarborough, opened in 1985, before it was permanently closed on July 24, 2023. The station's bus terminal is being expanded to handle replacement buses.

Construction to expand the station began in 2017 to add a platform for Line 5, which opened in 2026.

== Station complex ==
The station is located south of Eglinton Avenue, east of Kennedy Road. The station complex consists of four levels. Trains of the former Line 3 Scarborough previously ascended via a bridge to the platform located at the top level of the station complex. The ground floor (third floor, but labelled 2 in the elevator) consists of ten bus platforms surrounding the main building. The Stouffville line platform is located on the eastern side of the track and is directly integrated with Lines 2 and 5 via Line 5's eastern station entrance. Three satellite pedestrian entrances to the station can be found at the South Parking Lot, next to the Don Montgomery Community Centre, and the passenger pick-up and drop-off roundabout on Transway Crescent. (A fourth entrance, at the service road of Eglinton Avenue, was demolished in 2018.) Below the ground level is the concourse that spans the length of the station, connecting to all pedestrian entrances. Below the concourse is the platform for the trains of both Lines 2 and 5.

Four park and ride lots, that had a combined total of 729 spaces, used to be located around the station. As of August 21, 2023, these lots no longer exist.

Exterior of the station

Line 2 platform

=== Line 2 Bloor–Danforth ===
Line 2 Bloor–Danforth was opened on February 25, 1966, and was extended eastwards to Warden station on May 10, 1968, and to Kennedy station on November 21, 1980.

An extension of Line 2, called the Scarborough subway extension, is under construction that will make Kennedy a through-station. From Kennedy station, the three-stop, 7.8-kilometre (4.8 mi) extension will travel east under Eglinton Avenue, then north under Danforth Road and McCowan Road to terminate at Sheppard Avenue.

The platform walls at Kennedy were originally clad with two vertical rows of red vinyl slats separated by a black strip showing the station's name in Univers font. This cladding was replaced by grey enamelled panels using the traditional Toronto Subway font with red trim with smaller lettering along the top in a 2025 renovation, evoking the original stations along the line.

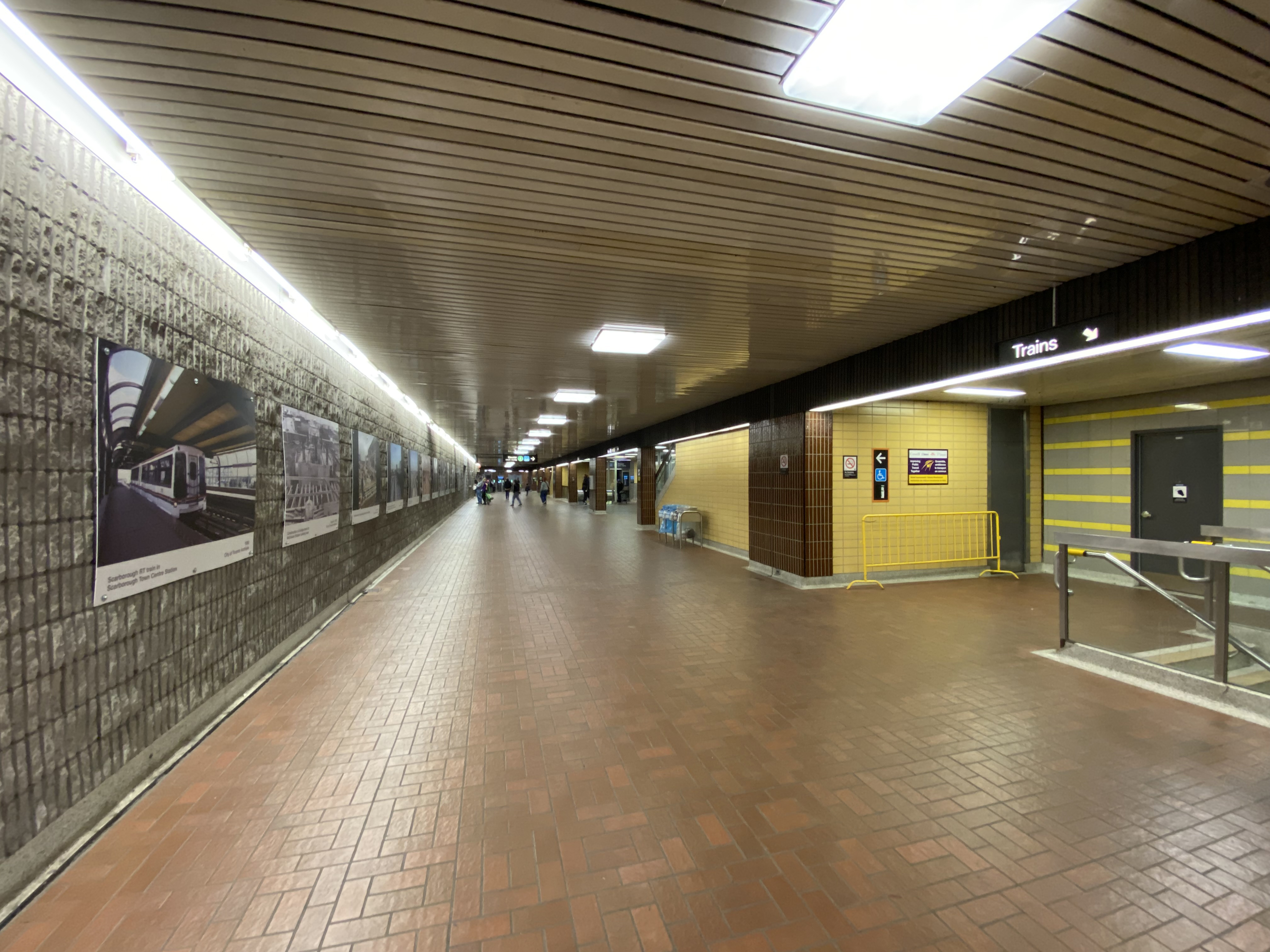
Concourse level of the station

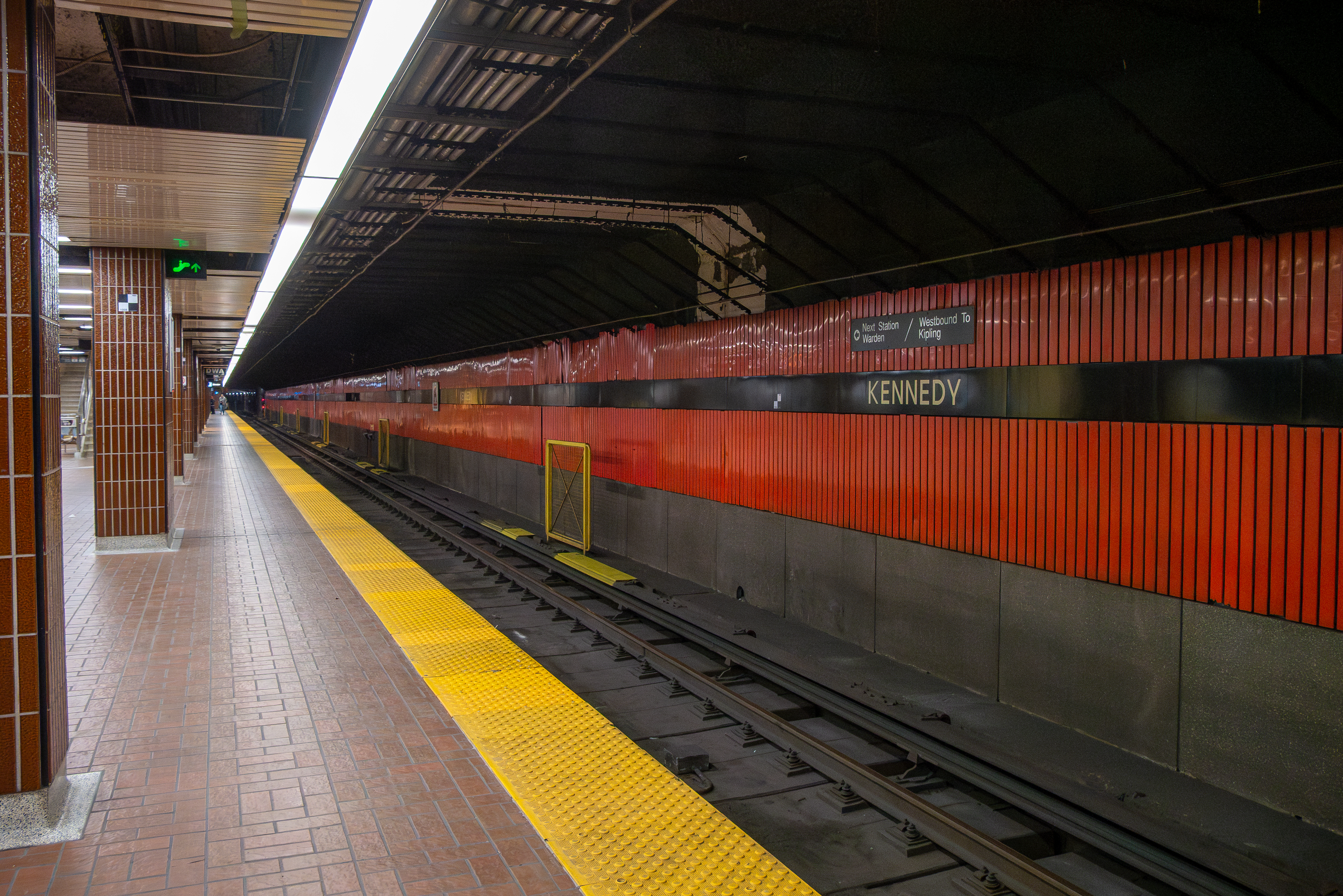
Former red vertical slats prior to renovation

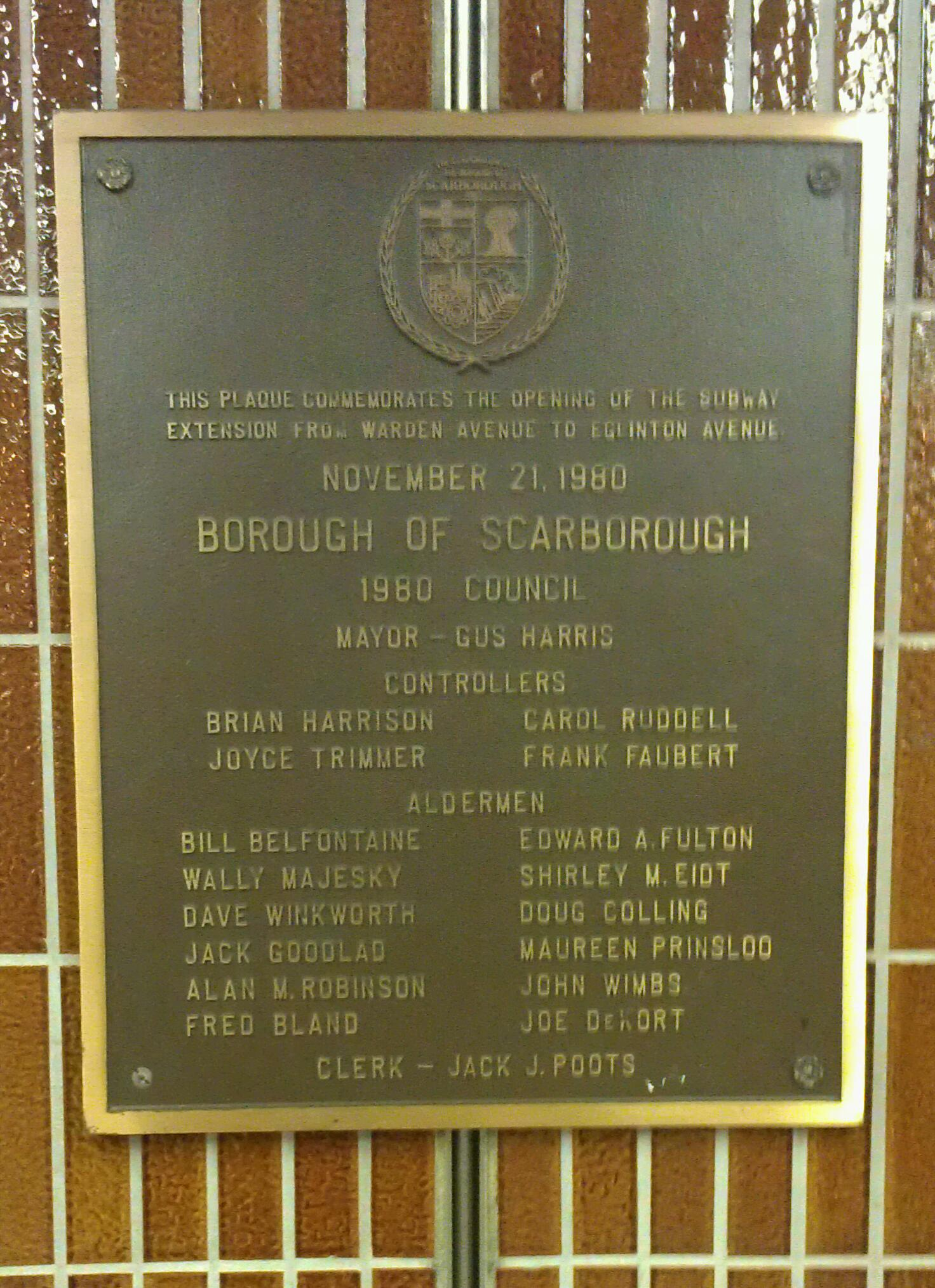
Plaque commemorating the extension of Line 2 to Kennedy station in 1980

=== Line 5 Eglinton ===
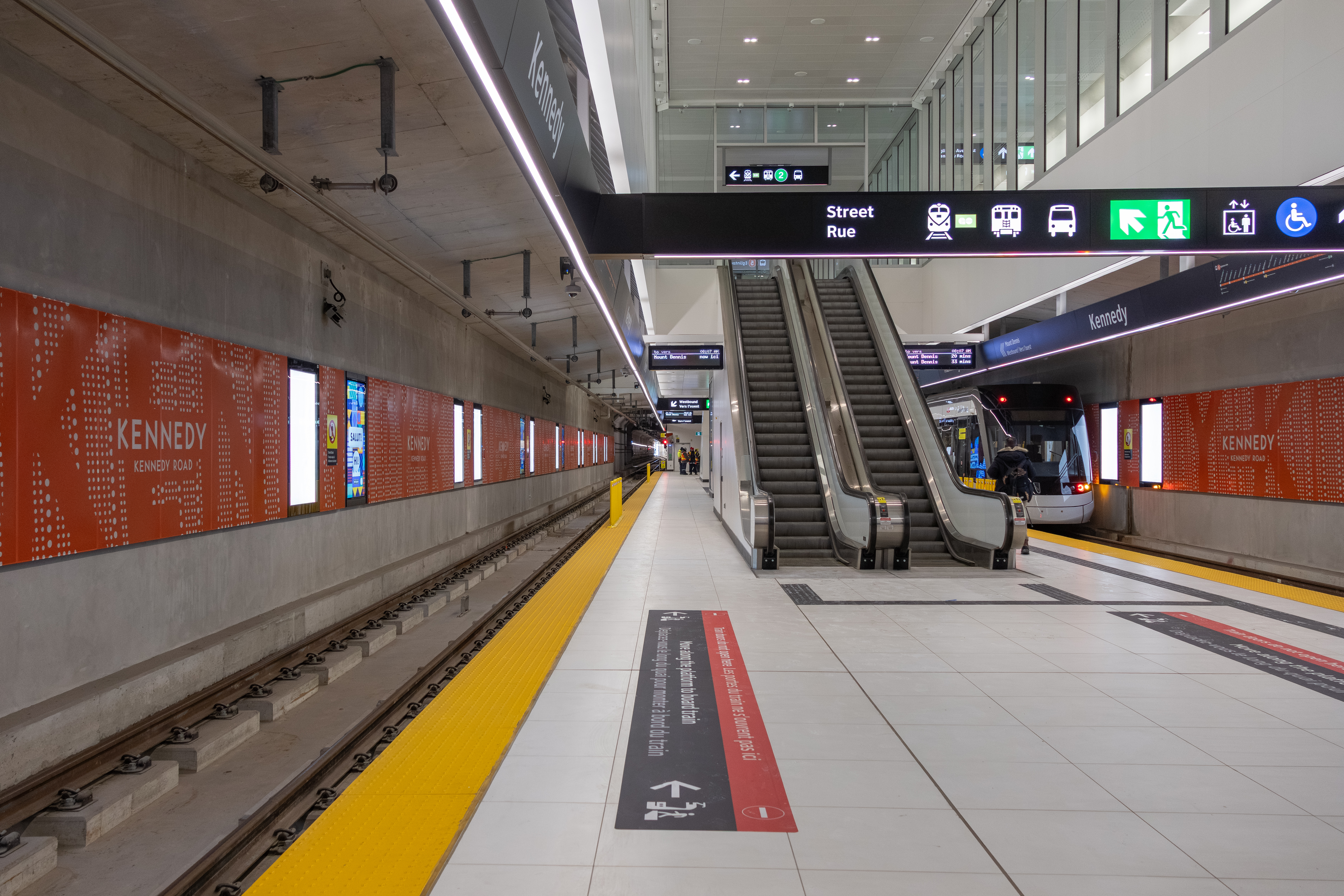
Line 5 platform

Kennedy was expanded to become the eastern terminus of Line 5 Eglinton. The Line 5 platform is also underground, south of Eglinton Avenue East, about 30 metres (98 ft) north of the Line 2 platform.

The main entrance to Kennedy station at the southwest corner of West Service Road and Transway Crescent was demolished and replaced by a new entrance to access the expanded concourse area built as part of the Line 5 project. Two elevators connect this newer concourse area to the Line 5 platform below. Two north–south passages connect the Line 5 section of the concourse to the original Line 2 concourse. There were few changes to the Line 2 concourse. A secondary entrance on the east side of the GO rail corridor serves as the main entrance to the GO station.

=== Stouffville line ===
Stouffville line platform

The Stouffville line platform at Kennedy opened on June 2, 2005.

Despite being on the CN Uxbridge Subdivision and preceding operators (Toronto and Nipissing Railway, Grand Trunk Railway and Canadian National Railway) dating to the 19th century, there was no previous railway station near this location.

Until February 2026, there was no operating permanent station building, only shelters along the platform. There is no staffed ticket booth; tickets are purchased from ticketing machines only.

In 2017, Metrolinx broke ground on the following improvements to Kennedy station in preparation for the opening of Line 5, including improvements to the Stouffville line infrastructure. These improvements included:

- A new station building and entrance on the east side of the tracks, which opened on February 8, 2026, along with the opening of Line 5
- A second track and platform with a connecting pedestrian tunnel
- Platform canopies and platform snowmelt systems
- Accessibility improvements
- A new passenger pick-up and drop-off area

=== Former Line 3 Scarborough ===
In 1985, Kennedy station was expanded to serve Line 3 Scarborough, an elevated light metro line with six stations. In 2023, Line 3 was decommissioned and is planned to be replaced by an extension of Line 2 to Scarborough City Centre.

Although Line 3 trains had bidirectionally operated metro trains, the tracks for Line 3 extended beyond the top-floor platform into an above-ground turning loop, similar to those found on the Toronto streetcar system. This was because Line 3 had been planned as a dedicated right-of-way streetcar line rather than a metro line. As such, the top-floor platform was designed to operate streetcars. Line 3 was later built as a medium-capacity rail transport line to use the Intermediate Capacity Transit System train models built by Bombardier Transportation. The line began using two-car trains, which were able to travel along the turning loop, but was later converted to use four-car trains, which could not be operated along the tight loop. Thus, the use of the loop for reversals was discontinued after 1988, although the loop's elevated structure remains over the passenger pick-up and drop-off building and was occasionally used as a tail track to store trains. The station platform was reduced to a single track and began using the Spanish solution of unloading and boarding passengers at Kennedy. Original floor finishing and platform edge markings for the planned light rail can also be seen along the current tracks.

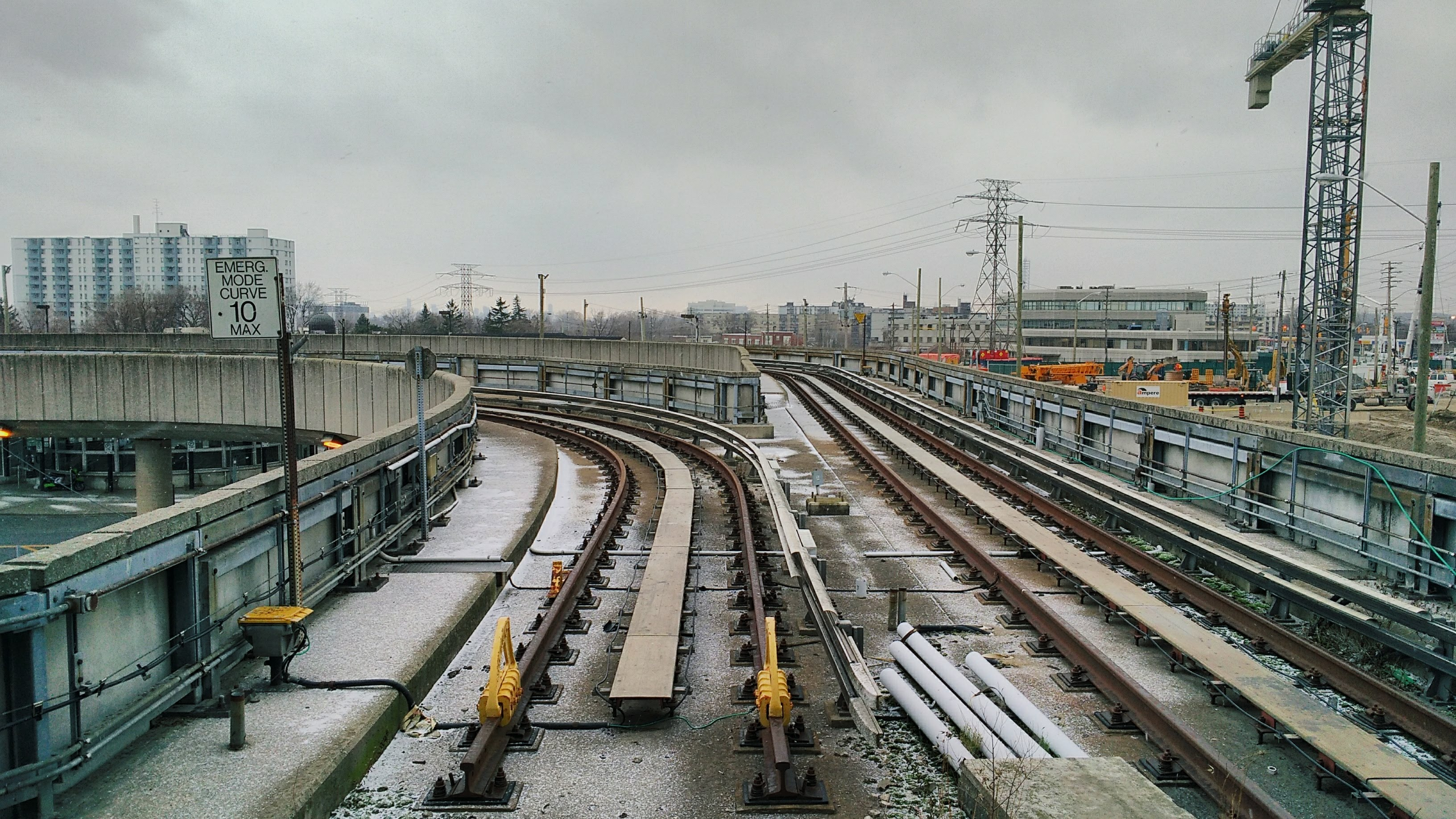
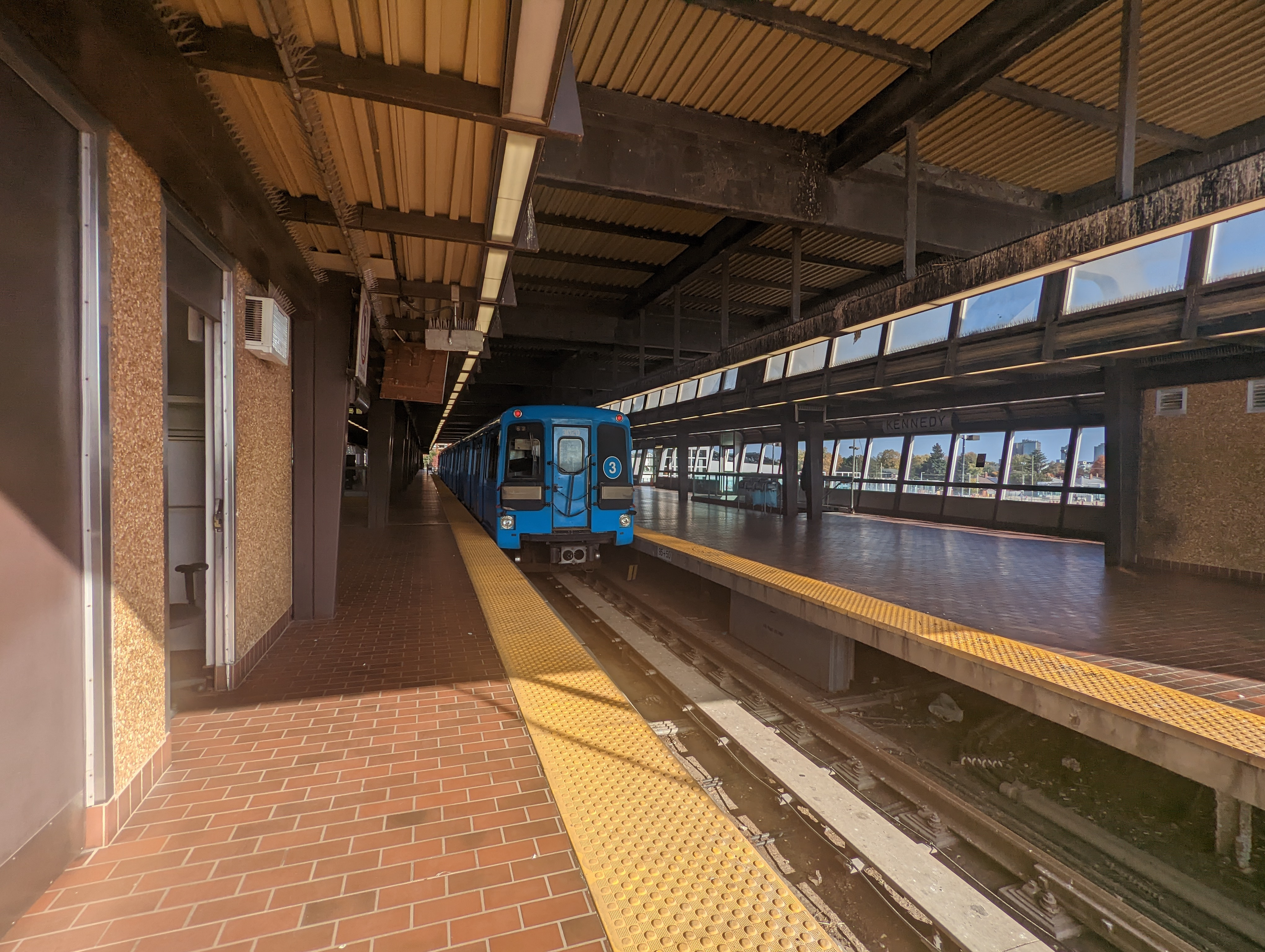
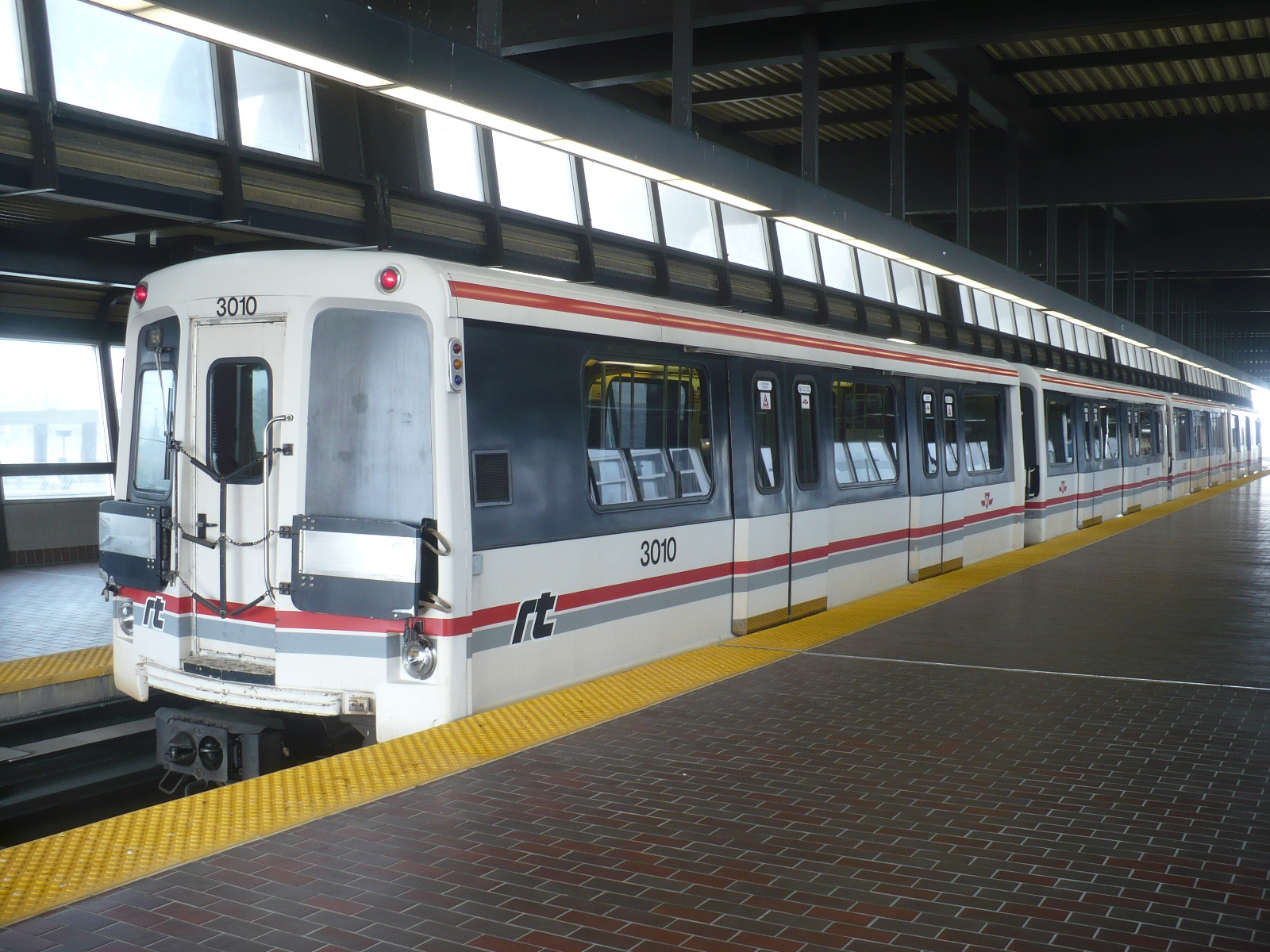
Line 3 trains originally looped at the west end of the station, which was double-tracked. The tracks were converted to single track with platforms on both sides providing access to the reversing trains.

== Public art ==
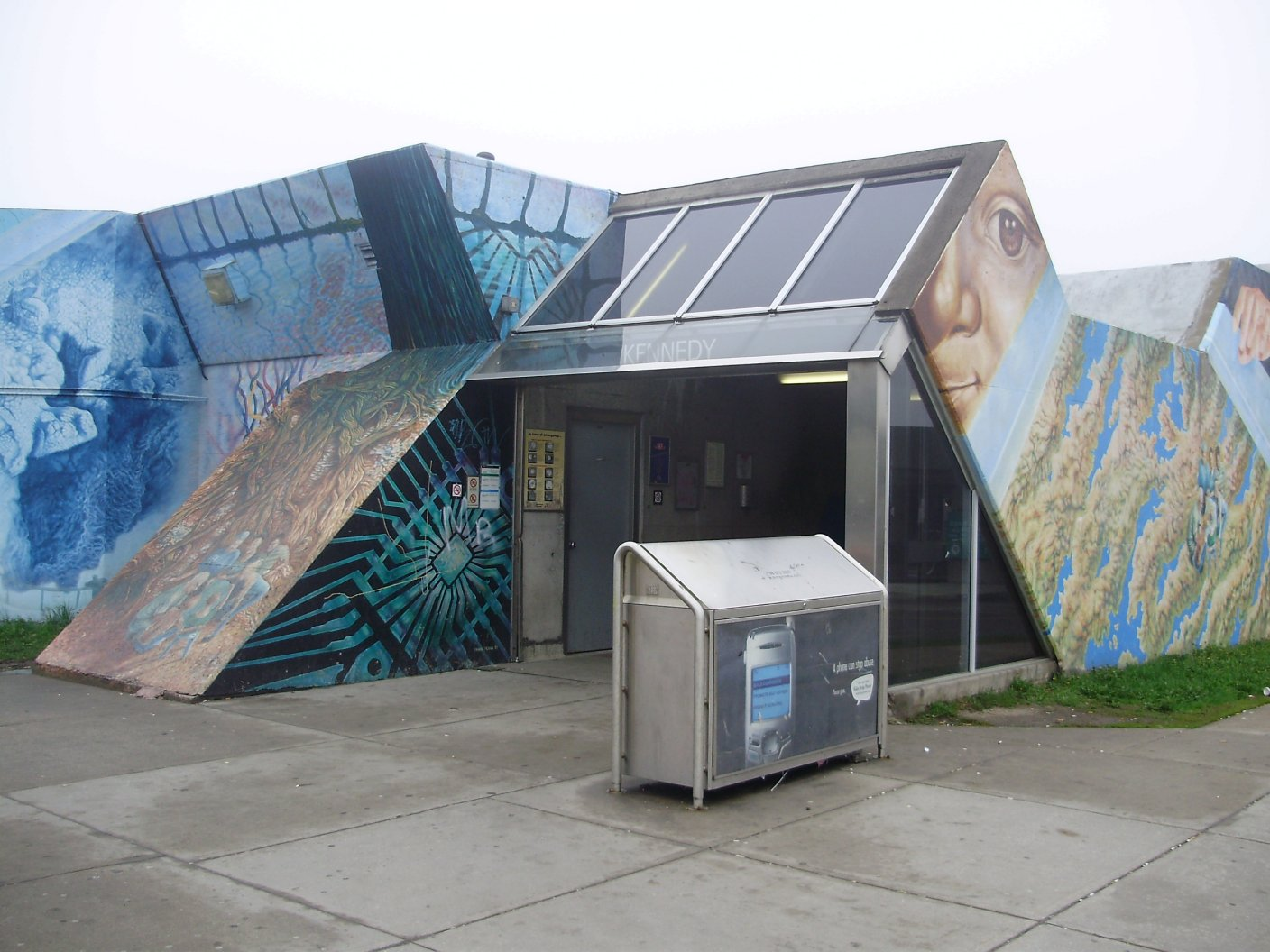
A Sense of Place at the former main entrance as seen in 2008. Only the left half is still intact, and what remains is behind temporary fencing.

Kennedy station used to feature a mural titled A Sense of Place by artist Frank Perna. The mural was completed in 1997 and used to wrap around the station's main entrance, but when the entrance was demolished in 2018, half of the mural was destroyed.

As part of a program to install public art at major interchange stations along Line 5 Eglinton, two new artworks were placed at the station. Reorganization of One Hedge, by Dagmara Genda, is a mural of photographs of leaves taken from the same hedge, and printed on the glass of a skylight, and Locations of Meaning, by Joseph Kosuth, consists of etched tiles with stainless steel inserts, each spelling the word "meaning" in one of the 72 languages used in Toronto.

== Surface connections ==
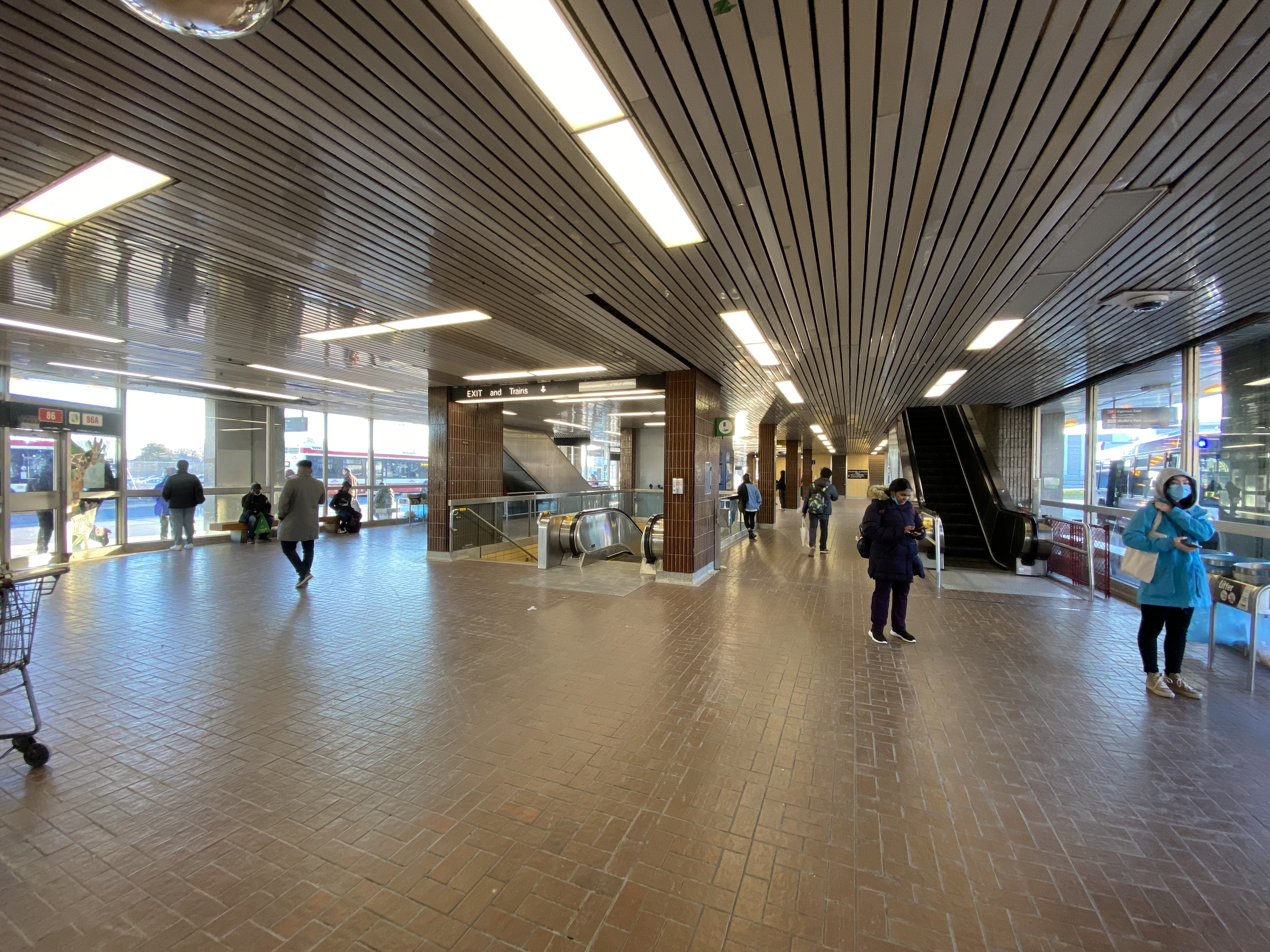
Bus platform level of the station

There are two bus platforms at Kennedy station. Platform A, within the fare-paid zone, contains bus bays 1 through 10. Bus platform B, opened on October 8, 2023, is located outside of the station building on the south side of platform A and contains bus bays 11 through 18, primarily serving buses running express to Scarborough Centre station. As of February 18, 2024, bus bays 6 through 10 are closed for construction related to the Scarborough Subway Extension.

While the subway is closed, passengers may board buses outside the station near Transway Crescent. TTC routes serving the station include:

| Bay number | Route | Name | Additional information |
Platform A
| 1 | Unloading only | | |
| 2 | 34 | Eglinton | Westbound to Mount Dennis station |
| 3 | 12A | Kingston Road | Westbound to Victoria Park station via Brimley Road and Variety Village |
| 3 | 12B | Kingston Road | Westbound to Victoria Park station via Brimley Road |
| 3 | 116 | Morningside | Eastbound to Finch Avenue East and Morningside Heights |
| 3 | 201 | Bluffer's Park | Southbound to Bluffer's Park (Seasonal service) |
| 4 | 86A | Scarborough | Eastbound to Toronto Zoo |
| 4 | 86B | Scarborough | Eastbound to Highland Creek (Rush hour service) |
| 4 | 86C | Scarborough | Eastbound to Sheppard Avenue East |
| 4 | 86D | Scarborough | Eastbound to Beechgrove Drive via Lawrence Avenue East |
| 4 | 154 | Curran Hall | Eastbound to Conlins Road |
| 4 | Wheel-Trans | | |
| 5 | 905 | Eglinton East Express | Eastbound to University of Toronto Scarborough |
| 5 | 986 | Scarborough Express | Eastbound to Sheppard Avenue East (Rush hour service) |
| 6 | Under construction | | |
| 7 | Under construction | | |
| 8 | Under construction | | |
| 9 | Under construction | | |
| 10 | Under construction | | |
Platform B
| 11 | 903A | Kennedy Station–Scarborough Express | Northbound to Centennial College via Scarborough Centre station |
| 11 | 903B | Kennedy Station–Scarborough Express | Northbound to Scarborough Centre station |
| 11 | 904 | Sheppard–Kennedy Express | Westbound to Don Mills station via Scarborough Centre station |
| 11 | 939A | Finch Express | Westbound to Finch station via Scarborough Centre station |
| 11 | 939B | Finch Express | Westbound to Finch West station via Scarborough Centre station and Finch station |
| 12 | 38A | Highland Creek | Eastbound to Rouge Hill GO Station via Scarborough Centre station |
| 12 | 38B | Highland Creek | Eastbound to University of Toronto Scarborough via Scarborough Centre station |
| 12 | 133 | Neilson | Northbound to Morningside Heights via Scarborough Centre station and Centenary Hospital |
| 12 | 938 | Highland Creek Express | Eastbound to University of Toronto Scarborough via Scarborough Centre station (AM rush hour service) |
| 12 | 386 | Scarborough | Blue Night service; eastbound to Sheppard Avenue East |
| 13 | 20 | Cliffside | Westbound to Main Street station |
| 13 | 113 | Danforth | Westbound to Main Street station |
| 13 | 131 | Nugget | Eastbound to Old Finch Avenue and Morningview Trail via Scarborough Centre station |
| 13 | 300B | Bloor–Danforth | Blue Night service; westbound to West Mall |
| 14 | 21C | Brimley | Northbound to Steeles Avenue East via Scarborough Centre station |
| 14 | 57 | Midland | Northbound towards Steeles Avenue East |
| 14 | 334A | Eglinton | Blue Night service; westbound to Pearson Airport |
| 14 | 334B | Eglinton | Blue Night service; eastbound to Finch Avenue East and Neilson Road via Morningside Avenue and westbound to Mount Dennis station |
| 15 | 129A | McCowan North | Northbound to Major Mackenzie Drive East via Scarborough Centre station |
| 15 | 129B | McCowan North | Northbound to Steeles Avenue East via Scarborough Centre station |
| 15 | Line 2 | Shuttle Bus | Westbound towards Warden station Operates during subway service disruptions |
| 16 | 43A | Kennedy | Northbound to Steeles Avenue East |
| 16 | 43B | Kennedy | Northbound to Scarborough Centre station via Progress Avenue |
| 16 | 43C | Kennedy | Northbound to Village Green Square (Rush hour service) |
| 16 | 943 | Kennedy Express | Northbound to Steeles Avenue East (Rush hour service) |
| 16 | 343 | Kennedy | Blue Night service; northbound to Steeles Avenue East |
| 17 | | | Layover Spot |
| 18 | | | Layover Spot |

== See also ==
- Eglinton East LRT, a proposed surface-level LRT line to run east from Kennedy station via Eglinton Avenue, Kingston Road and Morningside Avenue to Sheppard Avenue
- Scarborough busway, a busway that operates along the former Line 3 Scarborough right-of-way between Kennedy station and Ellesmere Road
