= List of Toronto subway stations =

Schematic Toronto subway map as of 2026

The Toronto subway is a system of five underground, surface, and elevated urban rail transit lines in Toronto and Vaughan, Ontario, Canada, operated by the Toronto Transit Commission (TTC). It is Canada's first rapid transit system. The first line, Line 1 Yonge–University, was built under Yonge Street with a short stretch along Front Street and opened in 1954 with 12 stations. Since then, the system has grown into Canada's largest in terms of number of stations and Canada's busiest, averaging about 1.1 million weekday passenger trips in the first quarter of 2025. There are a total of 109 operating stations with an additional 26 under construction and 5 former stations.

== Description ==
The subway system encompasses five lines and 109 stations on 100.1 kilometres (62.2 mi) of route. Plans were originally set to ensure all stations were made accessible by 2025; however, in September 2024, it was reported this goal would not be met. As of September 2026, College, Islington, King, Museum, and Old Mill stations are not fully accessible. Line 3 Scarborough, a light metro line with six stations, was permanently closed in July 2023.

As of September 2026, a new rapid transit line is under construction:

- Ontario Line, a 15-station, 15.6-kilometre (9.7 mi) line from Exhibition station to Don Valley station, scheduled to open in the early 2030s.

== Stations ==
Line 1 Yonge–University
Line 2 Bloor–Danforth
Line 4 Sheppard
Line 5 Eglinton
Line 6 Finch West

Station	Line	Location (Note: The "district" (dissolved city) within Toronto that the station is located in. If the station is not in Toronto, the city in which it is located is listed in italics.)	Grade	Opened	Ridership (Note: Weekday; 2023–2024)	Platform	Terminal within fare-paid area	Connections
Finch	Line 1 Yonge–University	North York	Underground	1974	70,775	Centre	Yes	GO Transit; YRT buses
North York Centre	Line 1 Yonge–University	North York	Underground	1987	16,699	Side	No	
Sheppard–Yonge	Line 1 Yonge–University Line 4 Sheppard	North York	Underground	1974 (Line 1); 2002 (Line 4)	92,828	Centre (Line 1); Side (Line 4)	Yes	GO Transit
York Mills	Line 1 Yonge–University	North York	Underground	1973	20,498	Centre	Yes	GO Transit
Lawrence	Line 1 Yonge–University	Old Toronto	Underground	1973	21,197	Centre	Yes	
Eglinton	Line 1 Yonge–University Line 5 Eglinton	Old Toronto	Underground	1954 (Line 1); 2026 (Line 5)	60,814	Centre (Line 1); Centre (Line 5)	Yes	
Davisville	Line 1 Yonge–University	Old Toronto	Surface	1954	15,903	Side	Yes	
St. Clair	Line 1 Yonge–University	Old Toronto	Underground	1954	27,336	Side	Yes	Toronto streetcar system 512 St. Clair
Summerhill	Line 1 Yonge–University	Old Toronto	Underground	1954	5,045	Side	No	
Rosedale	Line 1 Yonge–University	Old Toronto	Surface	1954	4,875	Side	Yes	
Bloor–Yonge	Line 1 Yonge–University Line 2 Bloor–Danforth	Old Toronto	Underground	1954 (Line 1); 1966 (Line 2)	278,184	Side (Line 1); Centre (Line 2)	No	
Wellesley	Line 1 Yonge–University	Old Toronto	Underground	1954	17,705	Side	Yes	
College	Line 1 Yonge–University	Old Toronto	Underground	1954	39,137	Side	No	Toronto streetcar system 506 Carlton
TMU	Line 1 Yonge–University	Old Toronto	Underground	1954	72,406	Side	No	Toronto streetcar system 505 Dundas
Queen	Line 1 Yonge–University	Old Toronto	Underground	1954	36,714	Side	No	Toronto streetcar system 501 Queen
King	Line 1 Yonge–University	Old Toronto	Underground	1954	35,107	Side	No	Toronto streetcar system 501 Queen 503 Kingston Rd 504 King 508 Lake Shore
Union	Line 1 Yonge–University	Old Toronto	Underground	1954	136,515	Side	Yes	Via Rail; Amtrak; Union Pearson Express; GO Transit; Ontario Northland buses
St. Andrew	Line 1 Yonge–University	Old Toronto	Underground	1963	34,576	Centre	No	Toronto streetcar system 503 Kingston Rd 504 King 508 Lake Shore
Osgoode	Line 1 Yonge–University	Old Toronto	Underground	1963	19,323	Centre	No	Toronto streetcar system 501 Queen
St. Patrick	Line 1 Yonge–University	Old Toronto	Underground	1963	23,989	Centre	No	Toronto streetcar system 505 Dundas
Queen's Park	Line 1 Yonge–University	Old Toronto	Underground	1963	34,444	Centre	No	Toronto streetcar system 506 Carlton
Museum	Line 1 Yonge–University	Old Toronto	Underground	1963	9,604	Centre	No	
St. George	Line 1 Yonge–University Line 2 Bloor–Danforth	Old Toronto	Underground	1963 (Line 1); 1966 (Line 2)	209,994	Centre (Line 1); Centre (Line 2)	Yes	
Spadina	Line 1 Yonge–University Line 2 Bloor–Danforth	Old Toronto	Underground	1978 (Line 1); 1966 (Line 2)	39,080	Side (Line 1); Side (Line 2)	Yes	Toronto streetcar system 510 Spadina
Dupont	Line 1 Yonge–University	Old Toronto	Underground	1978	11,084	Side	No	
St. Clair West	Line 1 Yonge–University	York	Underground	1978	21,013	Side	Yes	Toronto streetcar system 512 St. Clair
Cedarvale	Line 1 Yonge–University Line 5 Eglinton	York	Underground/surface	1978 (Line 1); 2026 (Line 5)	13,982	Side (Line 1); Centre (Line 5)	Yes	
Glencairn	Line 1 Yonge–University	North York	Surface	1978	5,878	Centre	No	
Lawrence West	Line 1 Yonge–University	North York	Surface	1978	19,742	Centre	Yes	
Yorkdale	Line 1 Yonge–University	North York	Surface	1978	19,725	Centre	No (Note: Station has or connects to regional (non-TTC) terminal only)	GO Transit; Ontario Northland buses
Wilson	Line 1 Yonge–University	North York	Surface	1978	21,579	Centre	Yes	
Sheppard West	Line 1 Yonge–University	North York	Underground	1996	19,495	Centre	Yes	YRT buses
Downsview Park	Line 1 Yonge–University	North York	Underground	2017	5,618	Centre	No	Barrie line
Finch West	Line 1 Yonge–University Line 6 Finch West	North York	Underground	2017 (Line 1); 2025 (Line 6)	18,345	Centre (Line 1); Centre (Line 6)	Yes	
York University	Line 1 Yonge–University	North York	Underground	2017	20,447	Centre	No	
Pioneer Village	Line 1 Yonge–University	North York	Underground	2017	16,570	Centre	Yes	YRT buses
Highway 407	Line 1 Yonge–University	Vaughan	Underground	2017	7,649	Centre	No	GO Transit; Ontario Northland buses; YRT buses
Vaughan	Line 1 Yonge–University	Vaughan	Underground	2017	20,394	Centre	No	YRT buses; Züm BRT
Kipling	Line 2 Bloor–Danforth	Etobicoke	Surface	1980	49,392	Centre	Yes	Milton line; MiWay buses
Islington	Line 2 Bloor–Danforth	Etobicoke	Underground	1968	25,023	Centre	Yes	
Royal York	Line 2 Bloor–Danforth	Etobicoke	Underground	1968	17,337	Side	Yes	
Old Mill	Line 2 Bloor–Danforth	Etobicoke	Underground/elevated	1968	6,109	Side	No (Note: Station has terminal, but it is outside the fare-paid area or connects to offsite terminal)	
Jane	Line 2 Bloor–Danforth	Old Toronto	Underground	1968	14,953	Side	No	
Runnymede	Line 2 Bloor–Danforth	Old Toronto	Underground	1968	15,838	Side	No	
High Park	Line 2 Bloor–Danforth	Old Toronto	Underground/surface	1968	9,173	Side	No	
Keele	Line 2 Bloor–Danforth	Old Toronto	Elevated	1966	16,305	Side	Yes	
Dundas West	Line 2 Bloor–Danforth	Old Toronto	Underground	1966	23,861	Side	Yes	Kitchener line (at Bloor); Union Pearson Express
Lansdowne	Line 2 Bloor–Danforth	Old Toronto	Underground	1966	17,406	Side	No	
Dufferin	Line 2 Bloor–Danforth	Old Toronto	Underground	1966	26,800	Side	No	
Ossington	Line 2 Bloor–Danforth	Old Toronto	Underground	1966	22,109	Side	Yes	
Christie	Line 2 Bloor–Danforth	Old Toronto	Underground	1966	11,407	Side	No	
Bathurst	Line 2 Bloor–Danforth	Old Toronto	Underground	1966	30,598	Side	Yes	Toronto streetcar system 511 Bathurst
Bay	Line 2 Bloor–Danforth	Old Toronto	Underground	1966	20,980	Centre	No	
Sherbourne	Line 2 Bloor–Danforth	Old Toronto	Underground	1966	24,689	Side	No	
Castle Frank	Line 2 Bloor–Danforth	Old Toronto	Underground	1966	8,943	Side	Yes	
Broadview	Line 2 Bloor–Danforth	Old Toronto	Underground	1966	11,720	Side	Yes	Toronto streetcar system 504 King 505 Dundas
Chester	Line 2 Bloor–Danforth	Old Toronto	Underground	1966	6,197	Side	No	None (Note: Unless otherwise noted, with "None", all stations or stops are served by at least one daytime TTC bus route.)
Pape	Line 2 Bloor–Danforth	Old Toronto	Underground	1966	34,506	Side	Yes	
Donlands	Line 2 Bloor–Danforth	Old Toronto	Underground	1966	6,317	Side	Yes	
Greenwood	Line 2 Bloor–Danforth	Old Toronto	Underground	1966	9,567	Side	Yes	
Coxwell	Line 2 Bloor–Danforth	Old Toronto	Underground	1966	13,450	Side	Yes	
Woodbine	Line 2 Bloor–Danforth	Old Toronto	Underground	1966	10,803	Side	Yes	
Main Street	Line 2 Bloor–Danforth	Old Toronto	Underground	1968	18,682	Side	Yes	GO Transit
Victoria Park	Line 2 Bloor–Danforth	Scarborough	Elevated	1968	32,276	Side	Yes	
Warden	Line 2 Bloor–Danforth	Scarborough	Elevated	1968	21,843	Centre	Yes	
Kennedy	Line 2 Bloor–Danforth Line 5 Eglinton	Scarborough	Underground	1980 (Line 2); 2026 (Line 5)	42,881	Centre (Line 2); Centre (Line 5)	Yes	Stouffville line
Bayview	Line 4 Sheppard	North York	Underground	2002	6,205	Centre	No	
Bessarion	Line 4 Sheppard	North York	Underground	2002	3,180	Centre	No	
Leslie	Line 4 Sheppard	North York	Underground	2002	3,988	Centre	Yes	Richmond Hill line (at Oriole)
Don Mills	Line 4 Sheppard	North York	Underground	2002	28,709	Centre	Yes	YRT buses
Mount Dennis	Line 5 Eglinton	York	Surface	2026		Centre	Yes	Kitchener line; Union Pearson Express
Keelesdale	Line 5 Eglinton	York	Underground	2026		Centre	No	
Caledonia	Line 5 Eglinton	York	Underground	2026		Centre	No	Barrie line (future)
Fairbank	Line 5 Eglinton	York	Underground	2026		Centre	No	
Oakwood	Line 5 Eglinton	York	Underground	2026		Centre	No	
Forest Hill	Line 5 Eglinton	Old Toronto	Underground	2026		Centre	No	
Chaplin	Line 5 Eglinton	Old Toronto	Underground	2026		Centre	No	
Avenue	Line 5 Eglinton	Old Toronto	Underground	2026		Centre	No	
Mount Pleasant	Line 5 Eglinton	Old Toronto	Underground	2026		Centre	No	
Leaside	Line 5 Eglinton	East York	Underground	2026		Centre	No	
Laird	Line 5 Eglinton	East York	Underground	2026		Centre	No	
Sunnybrook Park	Line 5 Eglinton	North York	On-street	2026		Side	N/A (Note: Stations marked "N/A" are not applicable as they are simple on-street LRT stops)	
Don Valley	Line 5 Eglinton	North York	Underground	2026		Centre	Yes	
Aga Khan Park & Museum	Line 5 Eglinton	North York	On-street	2026		Side	N/A	
Wynford	Line 5 Eglinton	North York	On-street	2026		Side	N/A	
Sloane	Line 5 Eglinton	North York	On-street	2026		Centre	N/A	
O'Connor	Line 5 Eglinton	Scarborough	On-street	2026		Side	N/A	
Pharmacy	Line 5 Eglinton	Scarborough	On-street	2026		Side	N/A	
Hakimi Lebovic	Line 5 Eglinton	Scarborough	On-street	2026		Side (split)	N/A	
Golden Mile	Line 5 Eglinton	Scarborough	On-street	2026		Side (split)	N/A	
Birchmount	Line 5 Eglinton	Scarborough	On-street	2026		Side	N/A	
Ionview	Line 5 Eglinton	Scarborough	On-street	2026		Side	N/A	
Humber College	Line 6 Finch West	Etobicoke	In-trench	2025		Centre	No	GO Transit; Züm BRT; MiWay; YRT
Westmore	Line 6 Finch West	Etobicoke	On-street	2025		Side	N/A	Brampton Transit; MiWay; YRT buses
Martin Grove	Line 6 Finch West	Etobicoke	On-street	2025		Centre	N/A	YRT buses
Albion	Line 6 Finch West	Etobicoke	On-street	2025		Side (split)	N/A	YRT buses
Stevenson	Line 6 Finch West	Etobicoke	On-street	2025		Centre	N/A	YRT buses
Mount Olive	Line 6 Finch West	Etobicoke	On-street	2025		Centre	N/A	YRT buses
Rowntree Mills	Line 6 Finch West	North York	On-street	2025		Side (split)	N/A	YRT buses
Pearldale	Line 6 Finch West	North York	On-street	2025		Side	N/A	None
Duncanwoods	Line 6 Finch West	North York	On-street	2025		Side	N/A	None
Milvan Rumike	Line 6 Finch West	North York	On-street	2025		Side (split)	N/A	
Emery	Line 6 Finch West	North York	On-street	2025		Side (split)	N/A	
Signet Arrow	Line 6 Finch West	North York	On-street	2025		Side (split)	N/A	
Norfinch Oakdale	Line 6 Finch West	North York	On-street	2025		Side (split)	N/A	
Jane and Finch	Line 6 Finch West	North York	On-street	2025		Side (split)	N/A	
Driftwood	Line 6 Finch West	North York	On-street	2025		Side (split)	N/A	
Tobermory	Line 6 Finch West	North York	On-street	2025		Side (split)	N/A	None
Sentinel	Line 6 Finch West	North York	On-street	2025		Side (split)	N/A	

== Stations under construction ==
Line 1 (Yonge North subway extension)
Line 2 (Scarborough subway extension)
Line 5 (west extension)
Ontario Line

Station	Line	Location	Grade	Opening	Platforms	Terminal within fare-paid area	Proposed transfers
Lawrence & McCowan (Note: Working name only–final station name not announced)	Line 2 Bloor–Danforth	Scarborough	Underground	2033			
Scarborough Centre	Line 2 Bloor–Danforth	Scarborough	Underground	2033		Yes	Scarborough Centre Bus Terminal; GO buses; Megabus
Sheppard & McCowan	Line 2 Bloor–Danforth	Scarborough	Underground	2033			
Jane–Eglinton	Line 5 Eglinton	York	Elevated	2030–2031			
Scarlett–Eglinton	Line 5 Eglinton	Etobicoke	Elevated	2030–2031			
Royal York–Eglinton	Line 5 Eglinton	Etobicoke	Underground	2030–2031			
Islington–Eglinton	Line 5 Eglinton	Etobicoke	Underground	2030–2031			
Kipling–Eglinton	Line 5 Eglinton	Etobicoke	Underground	2030–2031			
Martin Grove–Eglinton	Line 5 Eglinton	Etobicoke	Underground	2030–2031			
Renforth	Line 5 Eglinton	Mississauga	In-trench	2030–2031			MiWay; GO buses
Flemingdon Park	Ontario Line	North York	Elevated	2031			
Thorncliffe Park	Ontario Line	East York	Elevated	2031			
Cosburn	Ontario Line	East York	Underground	2031			
Gerrard	Ontario Line	Old Toronto	Railway embankment	2031			TTC streetcars
Leslieville	Ontario Line	Old Toronto	Railway embankment	2031			TTC streetcars
East Harbour	Ontario Line	Old Toronto	Railway embankment	2031			Lakeshore East; Stouffville
Distillery District	Ontario Line	Old Toronto	Underground	2031			TTC streetcars
Moss Park	Ontario Line	Old Toronto	Underground	2031			TTC streetcars
Chinatown	Ontario Line	Old Toronto	Underground	2031			TTC streetcars
King West	Ontario Line	Old Toronto	Underground	2031			TTC streetcars
Exhibition	Ontario Line	Old Toronto	Surface	2031			TTC streetcars; Lakeshore West
Steeles	Line 1 Yonge–University	North York / Markham / Vaughan	Underground	Mid-2030s		Yes	YRT
Clark	Line 1 Yonge–University	Markham / Vaughan	Underground	Mid-2030s		No	YRT
Royal Orchard	Line 1 Yonge–University	Markham / Vaughan	Underground	Mid-2030s		No	YRT
Bridge	Line 1 Yonge–University	Richmond Hill	Surface	Mid-2030s		No	YRT; Richmond Hill GO buses
High Tech	Line 1 Yonge–University	Richmond Hill	Surface	Mid-2030s		No	YRT

== Former stations ==
Line 3 Scarborough

Station	Line	Location	Grade	Open	Ridership (2019 avg. weekday)	Platforms	Terminal within fare-paid area
Lawrence East	Line 3 Scarborough	Scarborough	Surface	1985–2023	9,105	Side	Yes
Ellesmere	Line 3 Scarborough	Scarborough	Surface	1985–2023	1,993	Side	No
Midland	Line 3 Scarborough	Scarborough	Elevated	1985–2023	2,691	Side	No
Scarborough Centre	Line 3 Scarborough	Scarborough	Elevated	1985–2023	24,399	Side	Yes
McCowan	Line 3 Scarborough	Scarborough	Elevated	1985–2023	3,659	Side	No

== Gallery ==
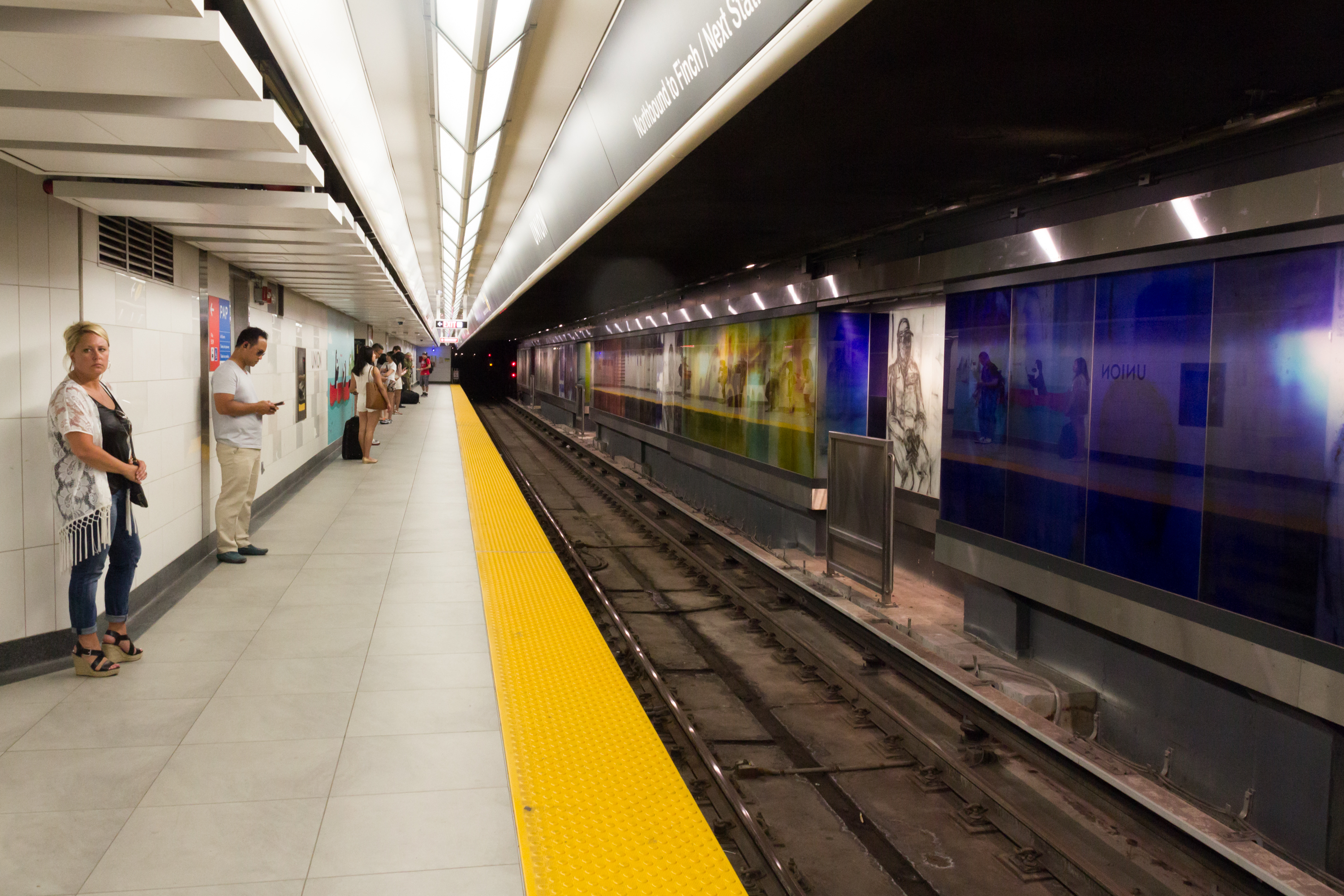
Union station was originally the southbound terminus of the subway's first line and connects to Toronto's main railway station.

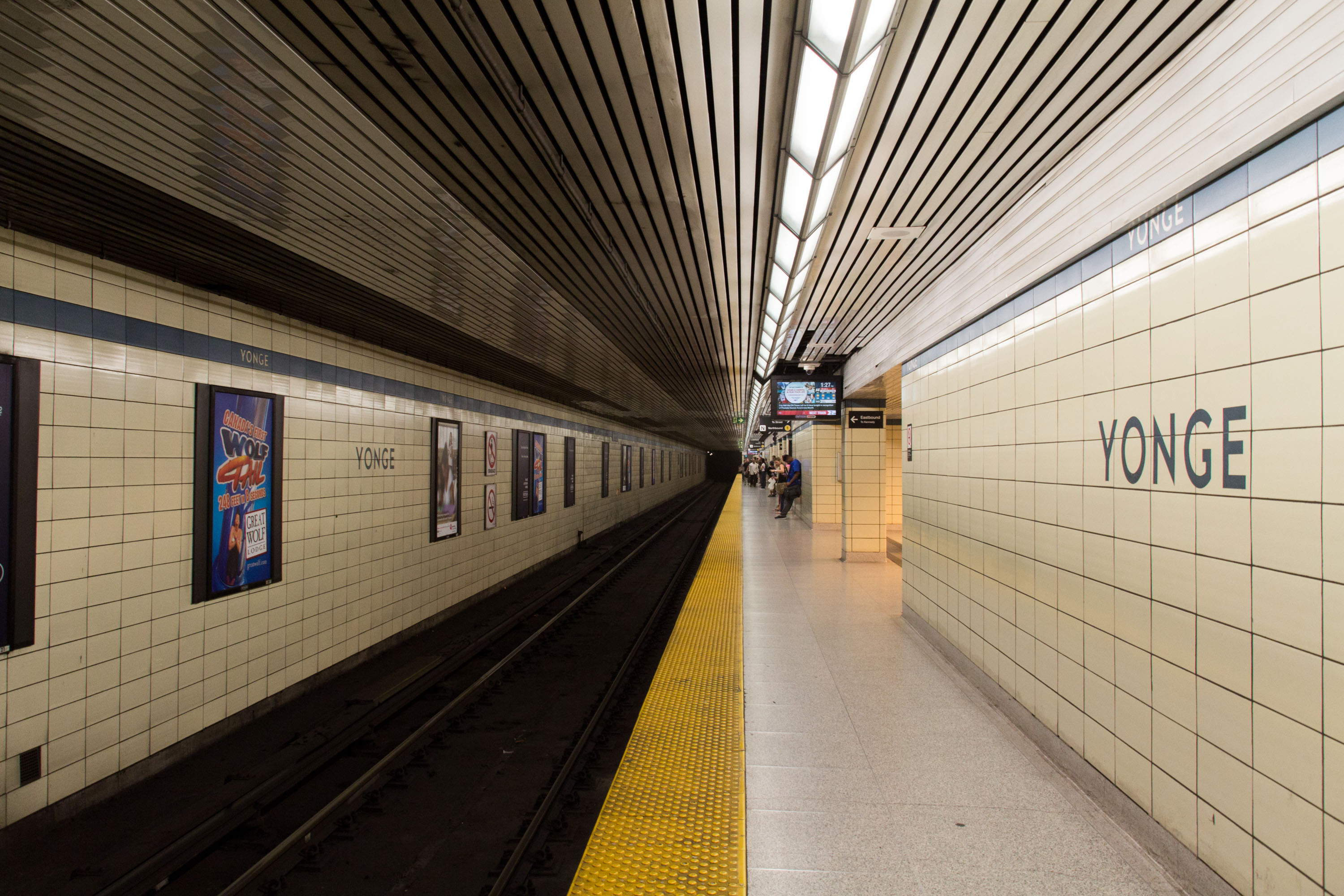
Bloor–Yonge station, an interchange station on Lines 1 and 2, is the city's busiest subway station.

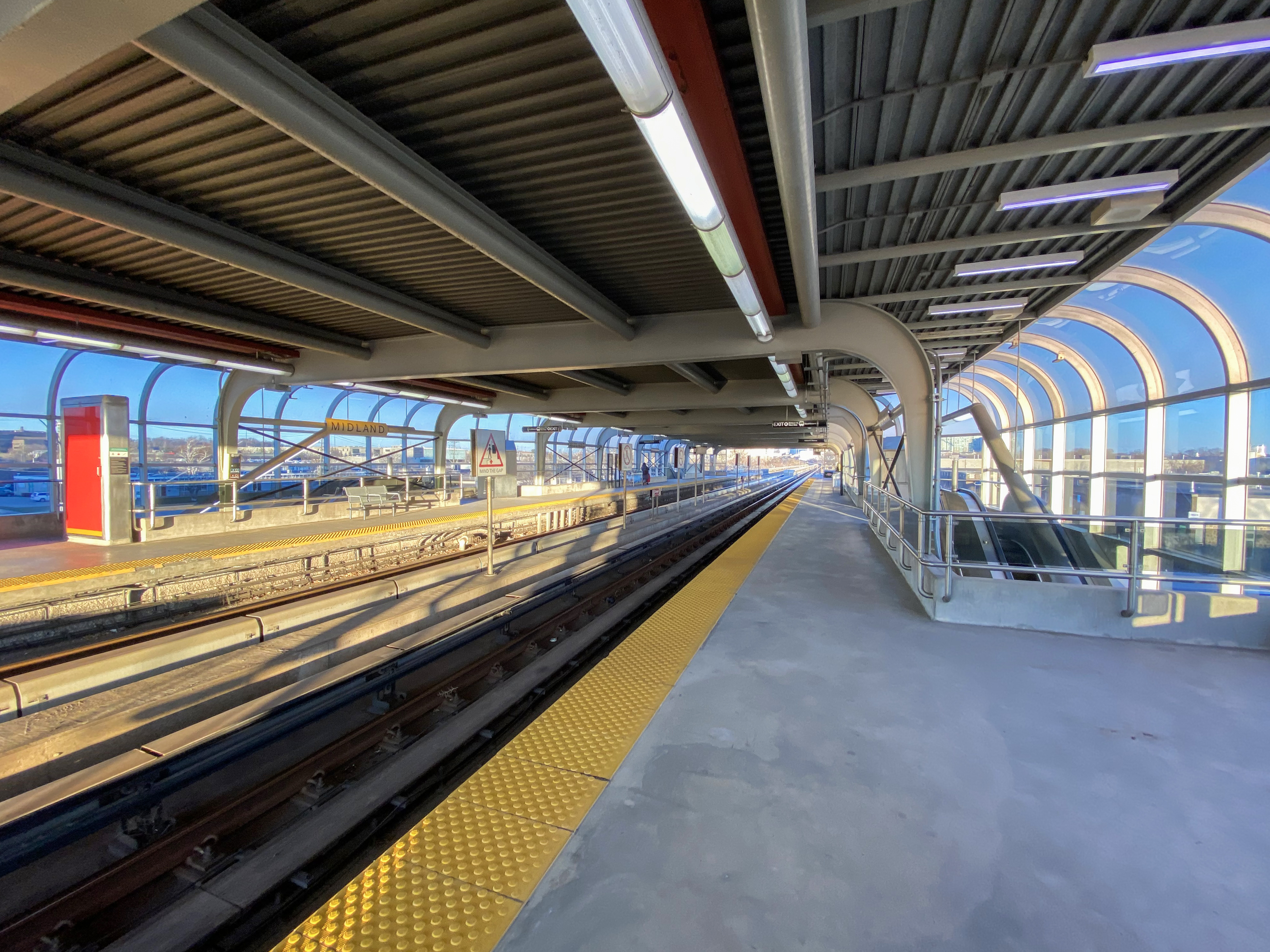
Midland station on Line 3 Scarborough was one of six stations on that line, which permanently closed in 2023.

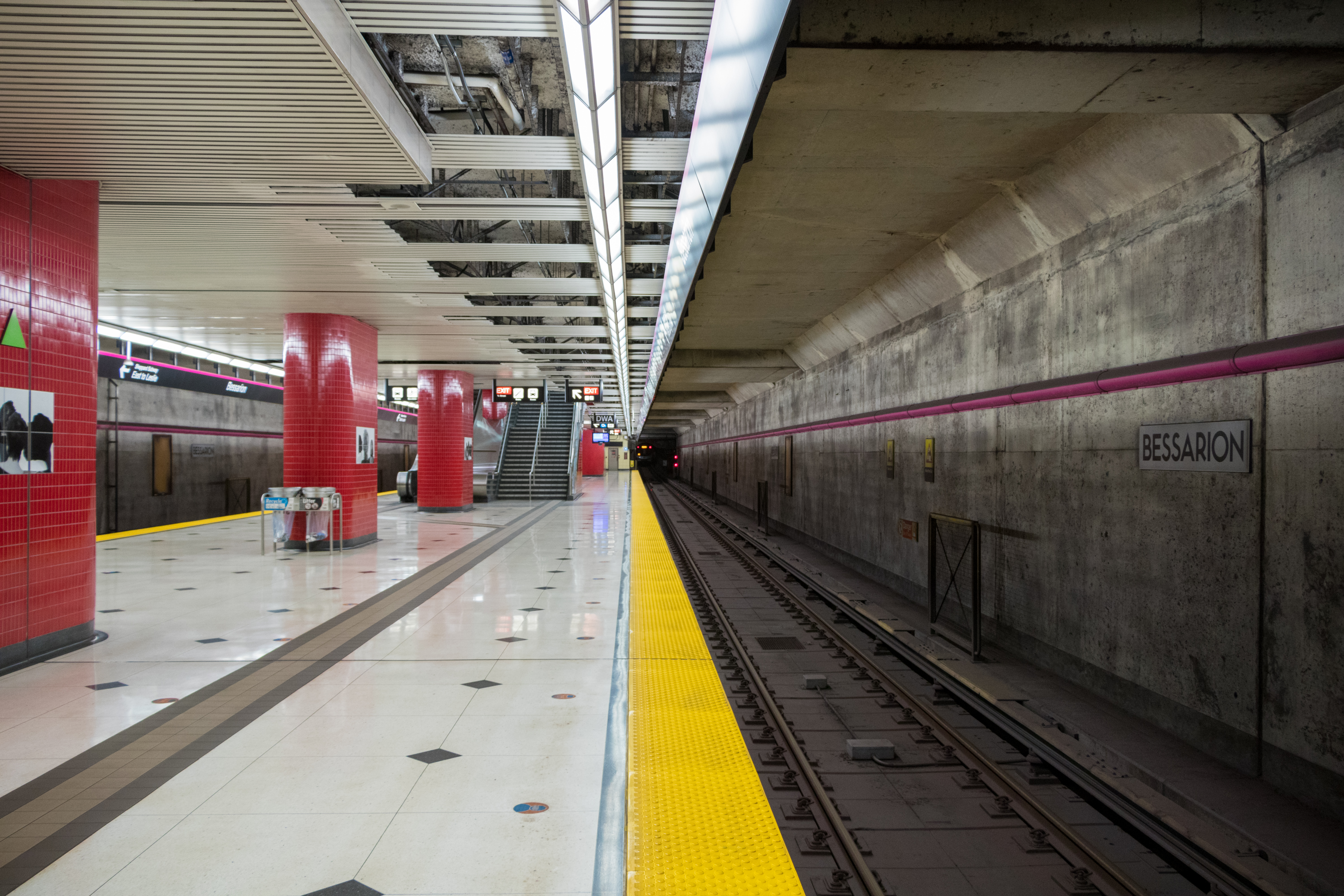
Bessarion station on Line 4 Sheppard is the least-used station in the system.

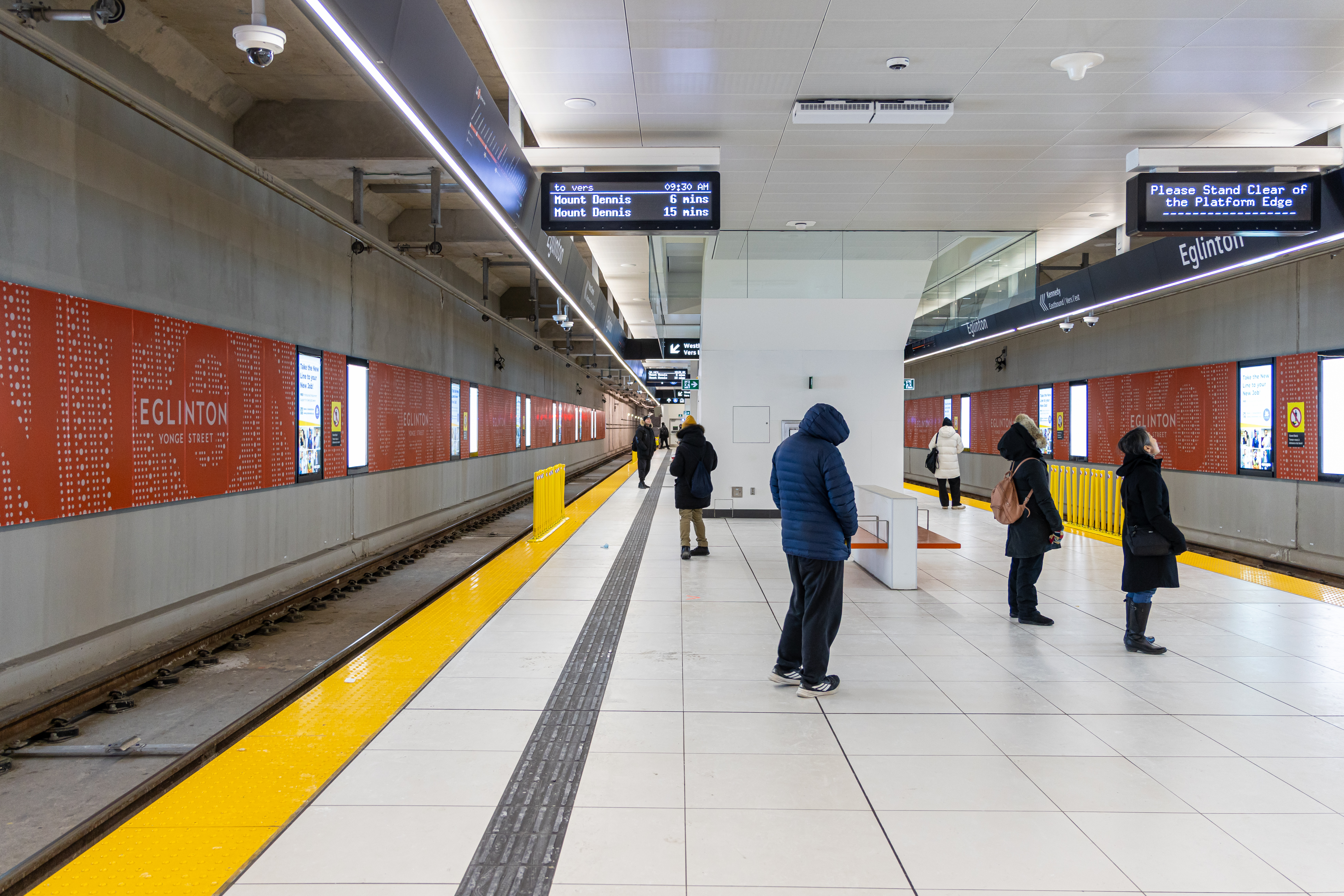
Eglinton station is one of 14 underground, grade-separated stations on Line 5 Eglinton.

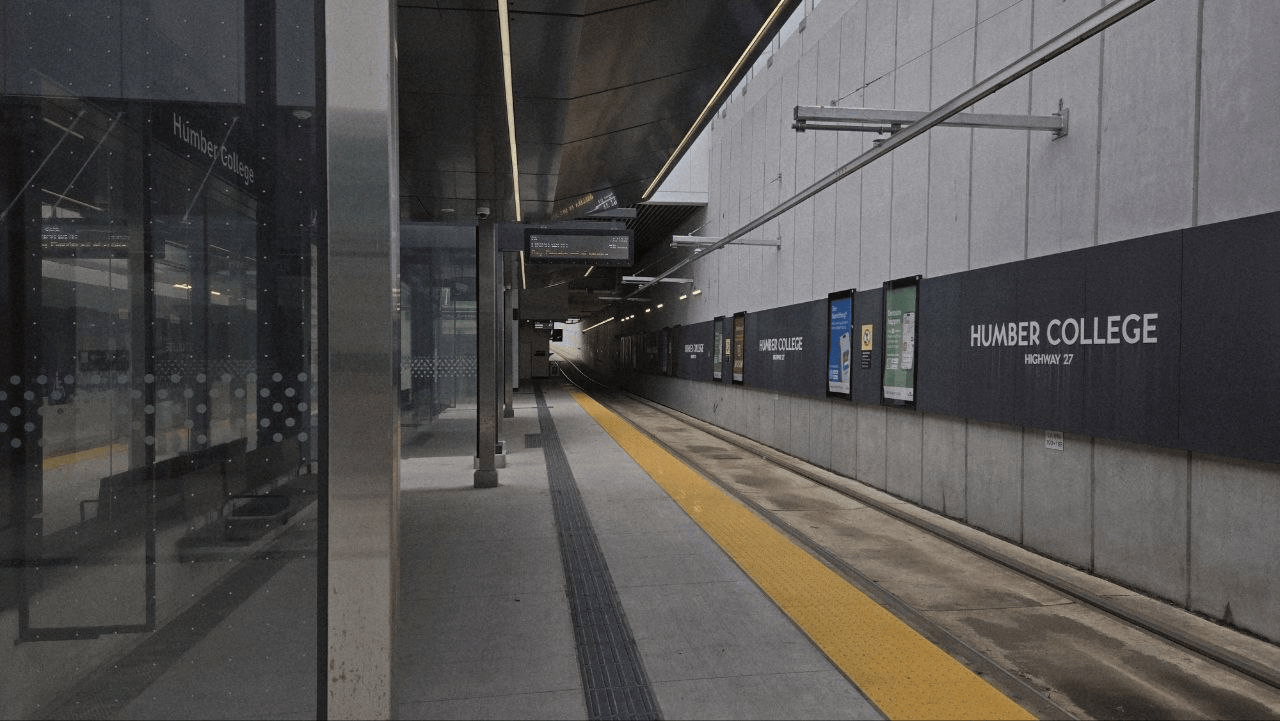
Humber College station is a below-grade station and is the western terminus of Line 6 Finch West.

== See also ==
- Toronto subway public art
