= Toronto Transit Commission accessibility =

Accessibility for people with disabilities on the Toronto Transit Commission (TTC) system is incomplete but improving. Most of the Toronto subway system was built before wheelchair access was a requirement under the Ontarians with Disabilities Act (ODA). However, all subway stations built since 1996 are equipped with elevators, and elevators have been installed in 53 stations built before 1996 (including 1 station that was expanded in 2002, Sheppard–Yonge). More than 90 percent (66 of 70) of Toronto's subway stations are accessible. The original plan was to make all stations accessible by 2025; however, a few stations might not be accessible until 2026.

All TTC trains offer level boarding for customers with wheelchairs and other accessibility needs. Buses, streetcars and trains have priority seating and dedicated wheelchair areas onboard.

Since 2015, all TTC bus routes have been operated by low-floor accessible vehicles. Since 2019, all streetcars running on the TTC's streetcar network have been low-floor accessible vehicles.

== Subway ==
=== Vehicles ===
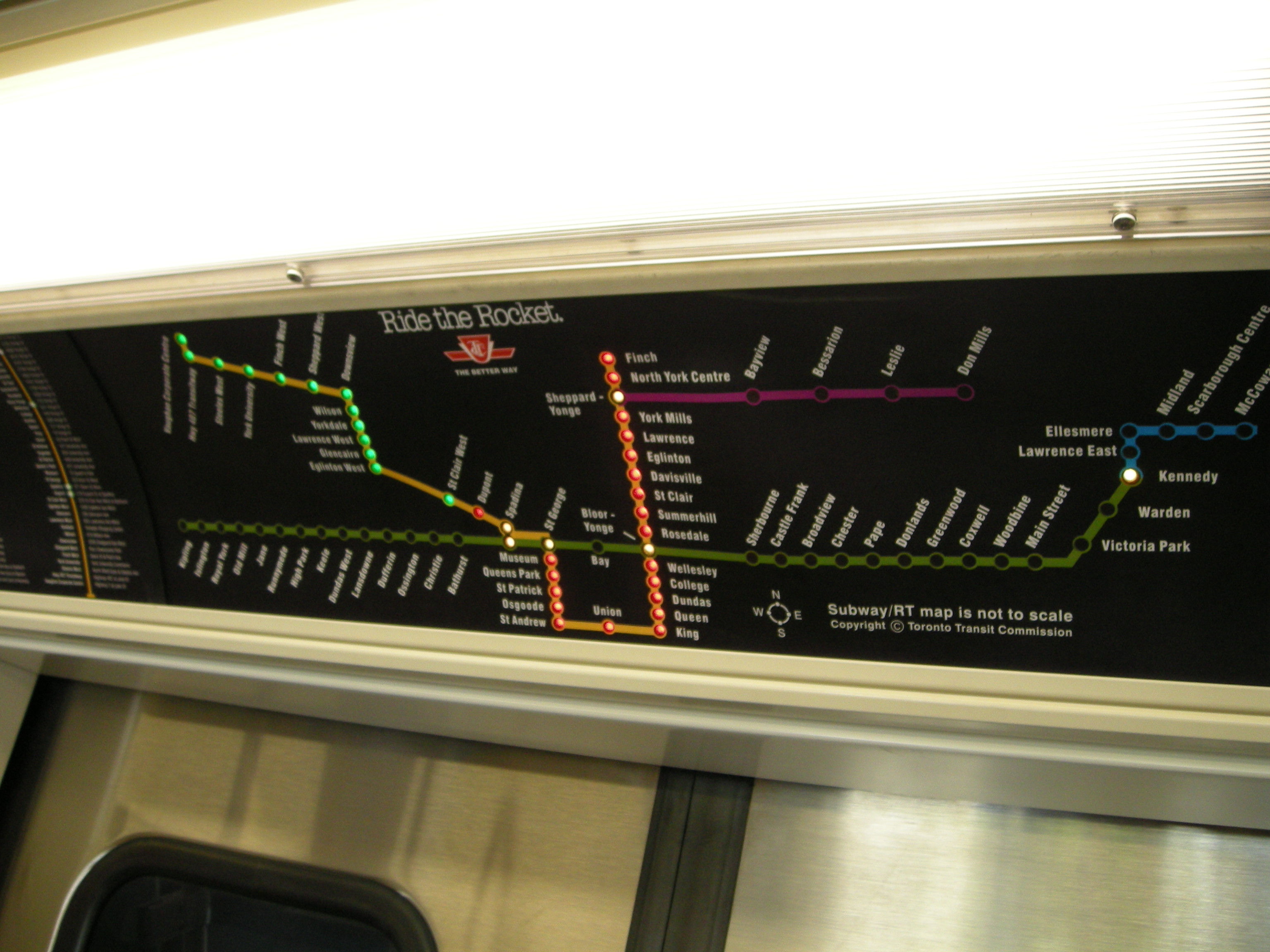
Sample active route map on display with the interior mockup of the new Toronto Rocket subway car

All TTC subway trains – the T series and Toronto Rockets – offer level boarding for customers with wheelchairs and other accessibility needs. They have priority seating identified in blue, and flip-up benches at designated wheelchair locations in each car. The location of these can be found by an exterior accessible icon beside the door, or on the Toronto Rockets, an additional exterior blue light beside the door.

The T1 series subway cars were the first trains to have:

- wider doorways,
- no centre line vertical stanchion bars.

All trains offer automated station stop announcements and, since 2019, visual side destination and route signs and external pre-boarding announcements broadcasting the route and destination the train is going to. The Toronto Rocket subway cars have twice the accessible seating compared to the T1 trains. The Toronto Rockets have visual displays (showing the next stop along with arrows pointing to which side doors will open on at the next stop) and electronic route maps to assist customers who are hearing-impaired and also verbally announce the side doors will open on at the next stop.

=== Stations ===
Accessible stations are equipped with elevators, wide fare gates, and access doors. The TTC provides a phone number, 416-539-LIFT, which provides a recorded message listing any elevators which are out of service. As of October 2026, 66 of 70 stations (94%) are accessible.

- All five stations on Line 4 Sheppard, opened in 2002, are fully accessible and equipped with elevators.
- Bayview
- Bessarion
- Don Mills
- Leslie
- Sheppard–Yonge
- 36 of the 38 stations on Line 1 Yonge–University are accessible:
- Bloor–Yonge (1996)
- Cedarvale (2005)
- College (2026)
- Davisville (2002)
- Downsview Park (2017)
- Dupont (2020)
- Eglinton (2004)
- Finch (1999)
- Finch West (2017)
- Glencairn (2024)
- Highway 407 (2017)
- Lawrence (2025)
- Lawrence West (2014)
- North York Centre (2009)
- Osgoode (2006)
- Pioneer Village (2017)
- Queen (1997)
- Queen's Park (2002)
- Rosedale (2025)
- Sheppard West (1996)
- Sheppard–Yonge (2002)
- Spadina (Line 1; 2026)
- St. Andrew (2012)
- St. Clair (2007)
- St. Clair West (2017)
- St. George (1999)
- St. Patrick (2018)
- Summerhill (2025)
- TMU (2002)
- Union (1996)
- Vaughan (2017)
- Wellesley (2020)
- Wilson (2020)
- Yorkdale (2021)
- York Mills (2007)
- York University (2017)
- 29 of the 31 stations on Line 2 Bloor–Danforth are accessible:
- Bathurst (1999)
- Bay (2020)
- Bloor–Yonge (1996)
- Broadview (2006)
- Castle Frank (2024)
- Chester (2020)
- Christie (2025)
- Coxwell (2017)
- Donlands (2024)
- Dufferin (2014)
- Dundas West (2002)
- Greenwood (2026)
- High Park (2025)
- Jane (2006)
- Keele (2021)
- Kennedy (1999)
- Kipling (1999)
- Lansdowne (2022)
- Main Street (2004)
- Ossington (2016)
- Pape (2013)
- Royal York (2019)
- Runnymede (2020)
- Sherbourne (2021)
- Spadina (Line 2; 1997)
- St. George (1999)
- Victoria Park (2011)
- Warden (2025)
- Woodbine (2017)

=== Planned elevator installation ===
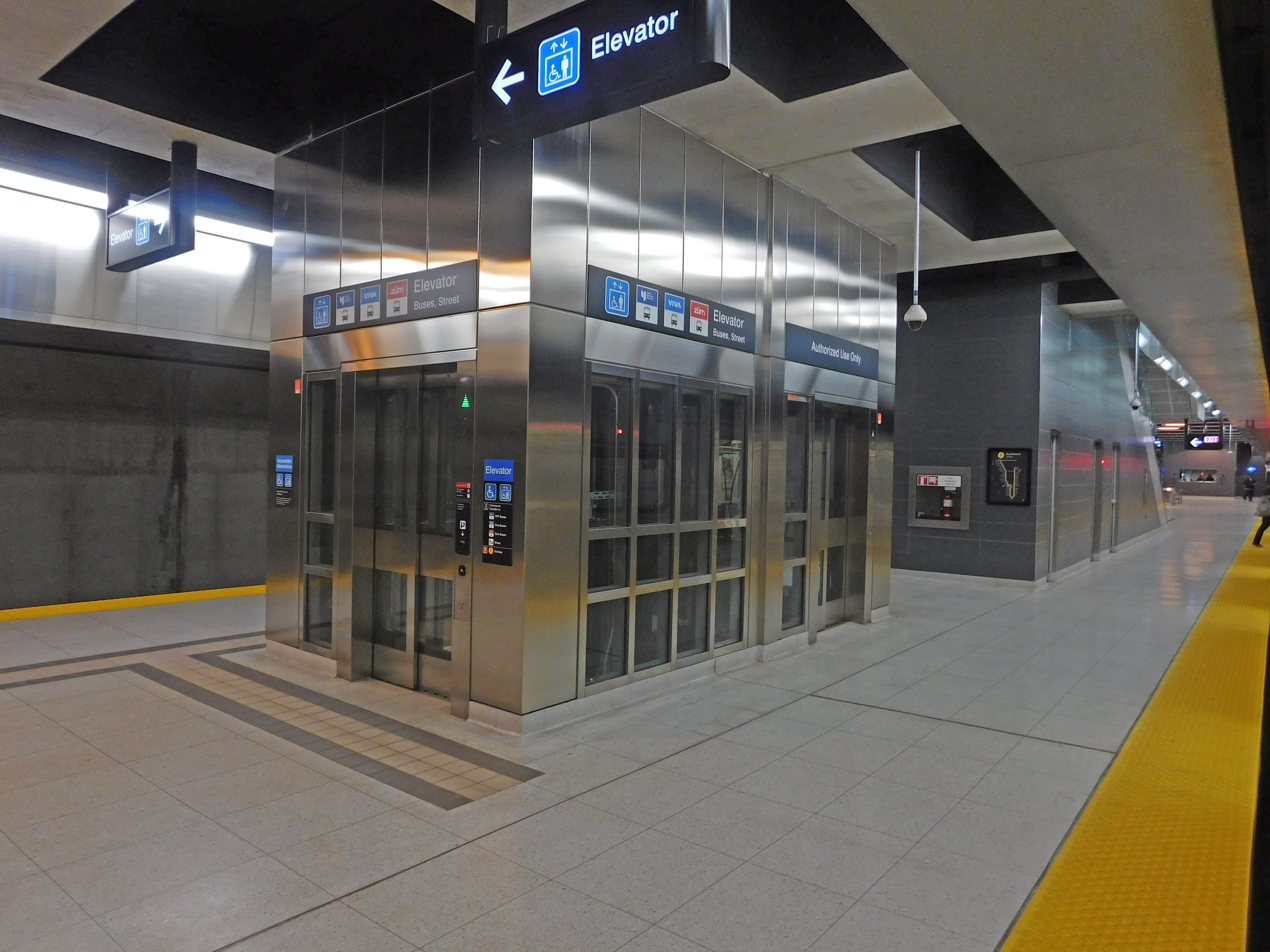
Elevators at the subway platform of Vaughan Metropolitan Centre station

In a 2015 report, the TTC stated that its target of having all stations accessible by 2020 would not be met and that it could not make all subway stations accessible by 2025 unless full funding was made available by governments. In March 2017, TTC CEO Andy Byford reaffirmed the agency's commitment to meeting the 2025 goal, pointing out that, at one point in its plan, 17 stations were under construction simultaneously. In May 2023, the TTC revised its target completion date for all stations from 2025 to 2024. However, in September 2023, the TTC noted that some stations would not be completed by the 2025 deadline, and that contingency plans would be put in place to satisfy ODA requirements.

Thus, effective January 5, 2025, the TTC implemented accessible bus service to stations without elevators by extending the hours of operation on two bus routes: 13A Avenue Rd to serve Museum and 97C Yonge to serve Summerhill, Rosedale, College, and King stations, as well as by creating a new route, 149 Etobicoke–Bloor, to serve High Park, Old Mill and Islington stations.

The completion plan for elevators in remaining stations is as follows, with all having work in progress:

Elevator installation schedule as of February 2026
Station	Original service date	Revised service date
King	2022	2026 Q4
Museum	2024	2026 Q2
Old Mill	2024	2028 Q3
Islington	2025	2027 Q2

The permanent closure of Line 3 Scarborough in July 2023 eliminated the need to upgrade Lawrence East, Ellesmere, Midland and McCowan stations for accessibility. Accessible buses serve passengers between Kennedy and Scarborough Centre stations.

== Buses ==
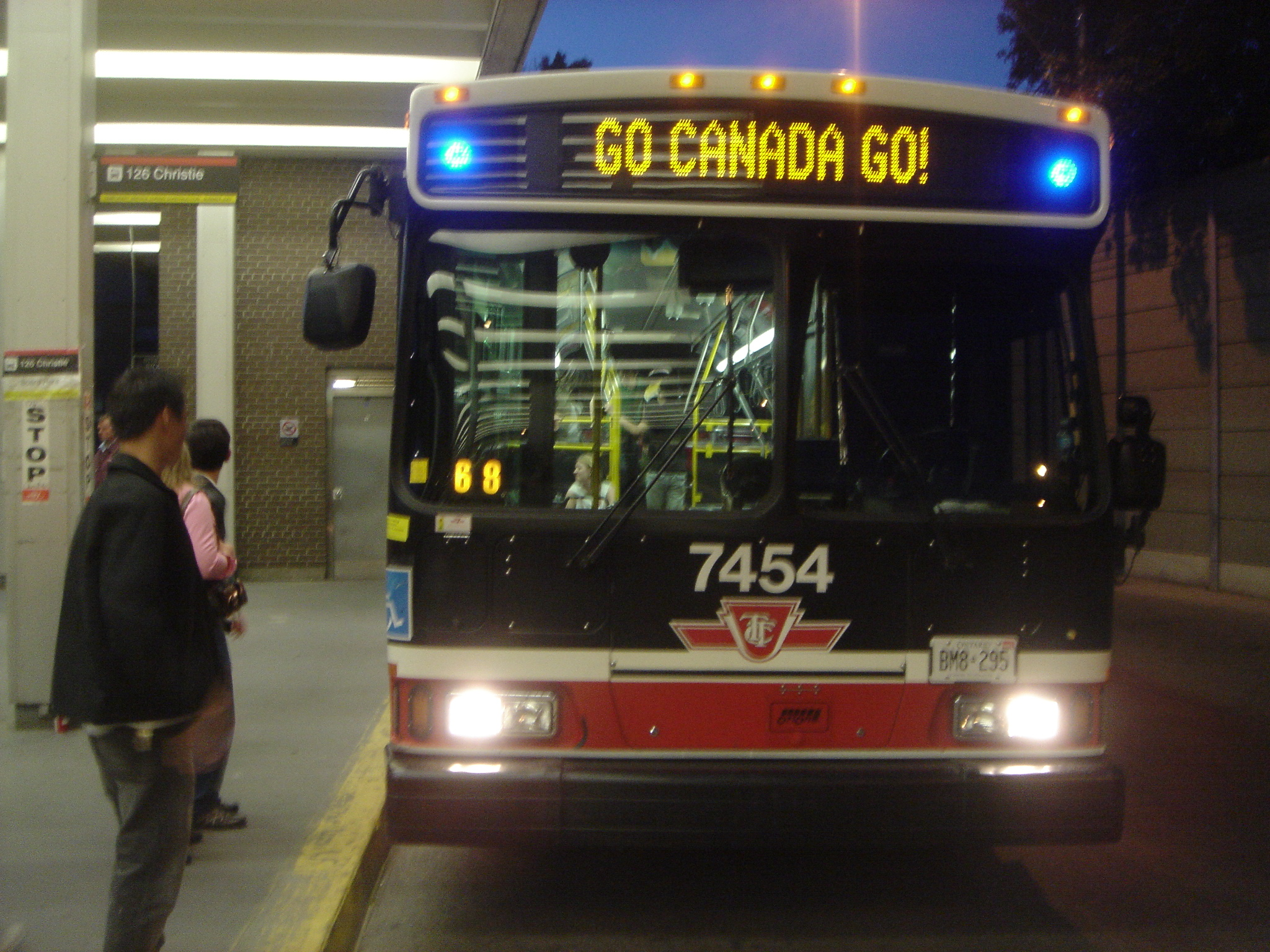
Blue indicator lights on both sides of the route sign indicate the bus is low-floor and wheelchair friendly.

Since the retirement of the last lift-equipped Orion Vs on December 4, 2015, all 170 bus routes have been 100% accessible, using low-floor buses (New Flyer Xcelsior, Nova Bus LF Series, and Orion VII). Not all stops along an accessible route are accessible (in particular, many subway stations where buses terminate are not accessible). The TTC's low-floor buses are identified by blue lights located on both sides of the front route display.

Each bus is equipped with a ramp at the front door and can lower itself at the front door. All buses have two onboard positions to park a wheelchair or scooter. Blue-coloured priority seating is available at the front of the bus for riders with disabilities.

Accessible bus stops are designated with the blue International Symbol of Access (the wheelchair symbol). Narrow sidewalks may make some bus stops unsuitable for ramp boarding, requiring the driver to stop the bus 3 metres (9.8 ft) away from the stop or to have the passenger board from within a bus shelter. As of 2021, there are several hundred such stops. The TTC plans to upgrade 180 such stops in 2021 plus another 400 stops by 2025. The City of Toronto will upgrade another 125 stops as part of road construction projects.

=== Wheel-Trans ===
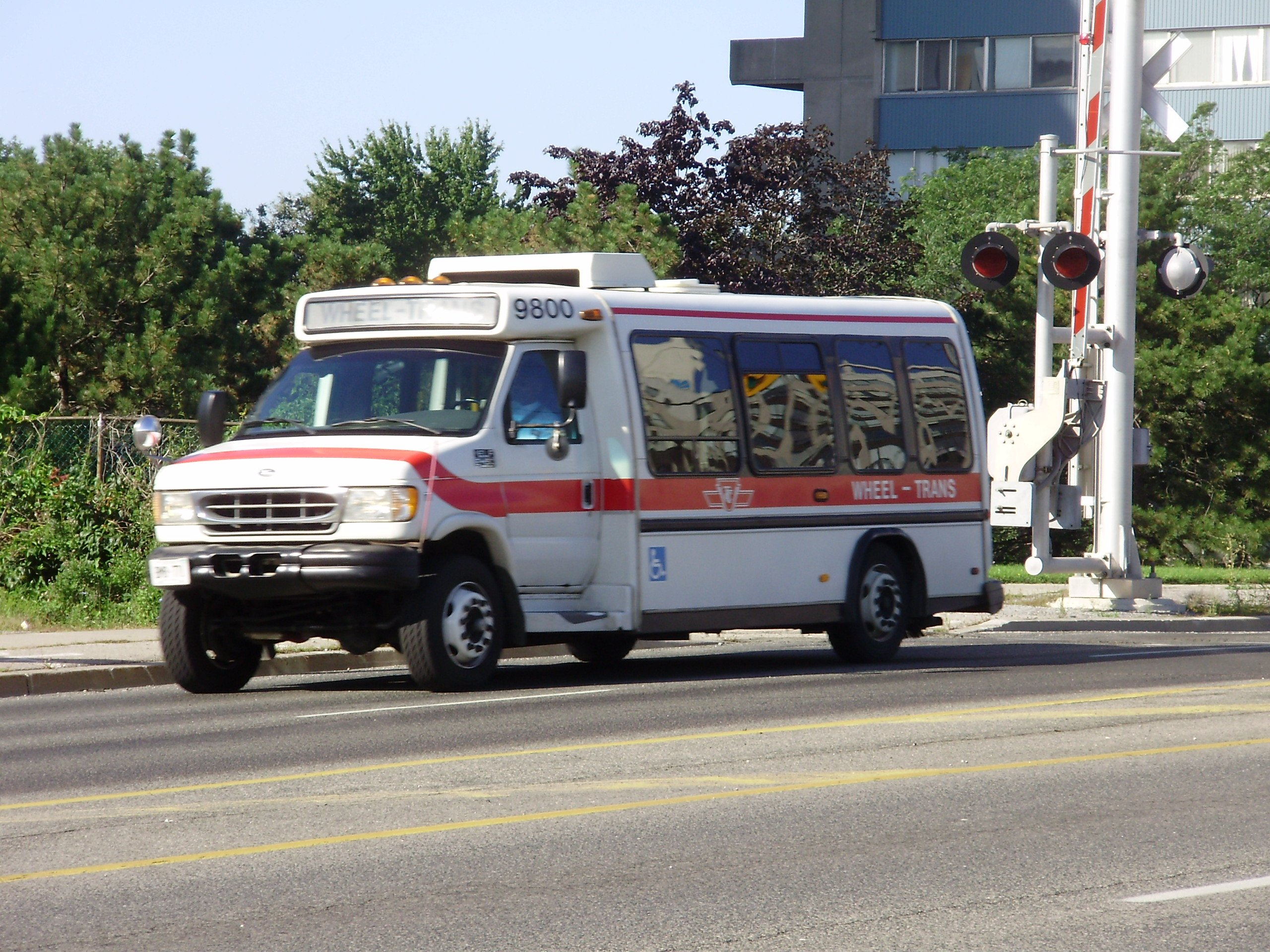
Wheel-Trans bus

The TTC provides Wheel-Trans, a door-to-door accessible transit service, to registered clients who are unable to use the conventional transit system. In some cases, Wheel-Trans buses connect customers from their homes to accessible subway stations allowing the rider to use the conventional system for a portion of their journey. The service was created in 1975 as the challenges for people with accessibility needs became more public, and at a time where the entire surface system ran high-floor vehicles which were inaccessible, and subway stations did not have elevators.

== Streetcars ==
As a result of the 2005 Accessibility for Ontarians with Disabilities Act, which requires all public transport services in Ontario to become accessible by 2025, the TTC ordered 204 low-floor and accessible Flexity Outlook streetcars in 2009. These first entered service on August 31, 2014, on the 510 Spadina line. With the retirement of the last high-floor Canadian Light Rail Vehicle (CLRV) streetcars on December 29, 2019, the entire TTC streetcar fleet consists of accessible Flexity Outlook vehicles.

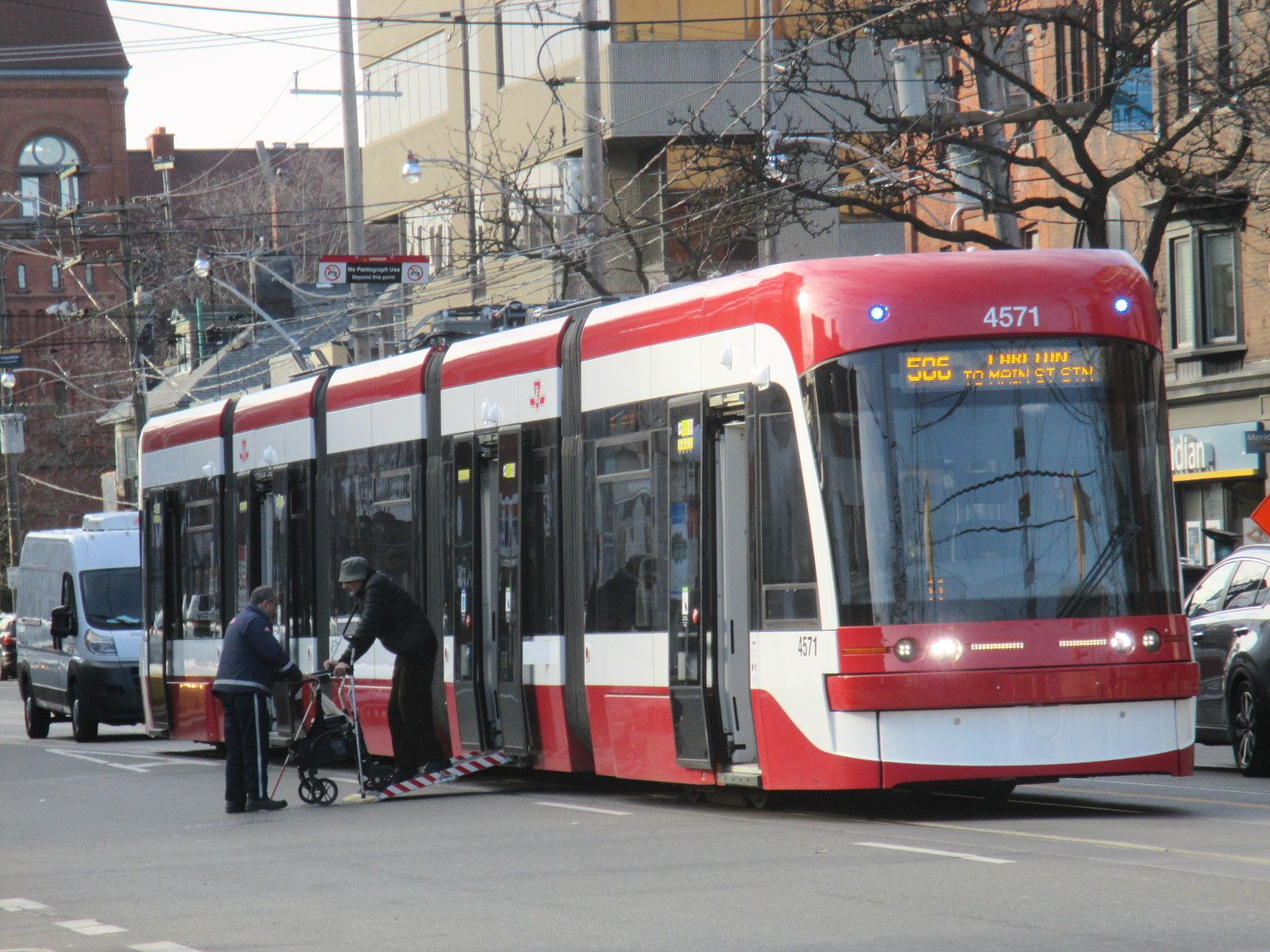
Operator helping passenger down the ramp deployed in the street

The Flexity Outlook streetcars are the TTC's first low-floor streetcars, and they are accessible for passengers using wheelchairs or mobility devices. Only one step is needed to board at any door, making accessing the streetcar easier for older people, pregnant women, people travelling with small children, or those travelling with heavy luggage.

An extendable loading ramp for riders using wheelchairs, strollers or other mobility devices is located at the second set of doors of the vehicle. A passenger can signal the operator to deploy the ramp by pressing the blue accessibility button by the inside or outside of this door. The ramp has two modes: if the streetcar stop is alongside a curb or raised platform, only a short portion is extended (the operator can open the ramp either from inside the driver booth or from the outside of the vehicle); if only street level is available, the operator will exit the vehicle and a further length of the ramp would extend to allow access at that level.

Inside the vehicle, there are two dedicated areas for passengers with wheelchairs or mobility scooters, as well as priority seating for disabled people, older people, and pregnant women.

All accessible streetcar stops are designated with the blue International Symbol of Access (the wheelchair symbol). A few streetcar stops are not accessible, requiring riders who need the wheelchair ramp to use another stop. Such stops may lack curb ramps, have a narrow platform or have structural challenges such as being located on a bridge. The height of some on-street streetcar platforms had to be adjusted so that the Flexity wheelchair ramp could be deployed. The last stops to be so adjusted were for the bumpouts along Roncesvalles Avenue, completed in 2023.

== Visual impairments ==
Service animals are allowed on the TTC during all hours of operation.

All stations have yellow warning strips with bumps at the edge of the platforms, and most have tactile floor tiles that assist persons with visual impairments in locating elevators and other accessibility features. All vehicles are equipped with automated audible stop announcements. Surface vehicles and Toronto Rocket trains also have visual LED stop displays.

In 2015, the TTC tested the new External Route Announcement (ERA) system for buses (similar to the system already in place since 2014 on the commission's Flexity streetcars), that indicates the route, direction and destination as a pre-boarding announcement. The announcements are made through a speaker located on the outside of the vehicle, when the doors are opened. As of 2019, all TTC surface vehicles and subway trains were equipped with this system in compliance with AODA requirements.

== Guidance ==
In January 2022, the TTC announced it had partnered with Magnusmode, the provider of MagnusCards – an app which helps guide autistic and neurodiverse persons in everyday life, to make using the TTC easier for these individuals. There are five TTC MagnusCards decks to guide a user, in a manner somewhat analogous to travel training, on accessing a TTC subway station, subway train, streetcar and bus, and also to advise on fares, on using the TTC customer website and its trip planner, and on contacting TTC Customer Service. The smartphone app offers step-by-step instructions using visual clues, text or audio.

== See also ==
- Accessibility of the Metropolitan Transportation Authority, New York
- Accessibility of transport in London
- MBTA accessibility, Boston
