= Scarborough busway =

Busway in Toronto, Ontario

- Scarborough busway adjacent to the Stouffville Line

Overview
- System: TTC bus system
- Operator: Toronto Transit Commission (TTC)
- Began service: 30 September 2026; 52 days ago
- Predecessors: Line 3 Scarborough

Routes
- Routes: 38 129 131 133 154 903 938 943
- Locale: Scarborough, Ontario
- Start: Kennedy station
- End: Ellesmere station
- Length: 4 kilometres (2.5 mi)
- Stops: 4

The Scarborough busway (previously referred to as the Line 3 busway) in Toronto, Ontario, Canada, is a bus-only roadway that uses approximately 4 kilometres (2.5 mi) of the former right-of-way of Line 3 Scarborough between Kennedy station and the former Ellesmere station, paralleling GO Transit's Stouffville line. The Toronto Transit Commission (TTC) operates the busway. The converted right-of-way has stops at Kennedy, Tara Avenue / Mooregate Avenue, Lawrence East and Ellesmere stations. Buses then continue via priority lanes on Ellesmere Road to Scarborough Centre station. Multiple TTC bus routes serve the busway, allowing riders travelling to and from other parts of Scarborough to remain on their buses rather than transfer to a separate replacement service.

Removal of the former Line 3 rails and wayside electrical equipment began in 2024 and was completed by the end of that year. The main construction contract was awarded to Clearway Construction in 2025, and construction began that year. The project was originally expected to be completed in 2027 but was subsequently accelerated. On August 20, 2026, the TTC confirmed that the busway was scheduled to open for revenue service that September 30, more than six months ahead of the revised schedule. The busway opened for service as expected on September 30, 2026.

The busway is intended to provide faster and more reliable service between Kennedy and Scarborough Centre while the Scarborough subway extension is under construction. The TTC expects a trip between Kennedy and Scarborough Centre stations to take approximately 15 minutes after the busway opens, about seven minutes faster than the interim on-street replacement service. Toronto mayor Olivia Chow said the busway was expected to serve more than 118,000 riders per week. The busway is also expected to remain available after completion of the subway extension as additional rapid transit infrastructure in the corridor.

== History ==
=== Replacement of Line 3 ===
On April 10, 2019, Ontario premier Doug Ford announced that Line 3 Scarborough would be replaced by a three-stop extension of Line 2 Bloor–Danforth to be completed by 2030. However, on December 10, 2020, Toronto mayor John Tory stated that Line 3 was likely to fail and be taken out of service before the Scarborough subway extension was completed, possibly several years earlier. At that point, the Line 3 vehicles were 35 years old, a decade beyond their original 25-year design life, and had become increasingly unreliable and difficult to maintain. The TTC therefore began studying replacement bus service.

In February 2021, the TTC recommended permanently closing Line 3 in 2023 and replacing it with bus service. The TTC rejected a third overhaul of the line, which had an estimated cost of $522.4 million and was not expected to guarantee reliable operation. In April 2022, the TTC proposed converting approximately 4 kilometres (2.5 mi) of the Line 3 right-of-way between Kennedy station and the former Ellesmere station into a dedicated busway. Stops were proposed at Mooregate Avenue / Tara Avenue, Lawrence East and Ellesmere. Buses would leave the converted right-of-way at Ellesmere and continue using surface streets to Scarborough Centre station. The elevated portion of Line 3 serving Midland and McCowan stations was not suitable for conversion to bus use.

By August 2023, newly elected mayor Olivia Chow had committed to constructing the busway, which was then estimated to cost $55 million and take approximately two years to complete.

Pending construction of the busway, the TTC planned interim transit-priority measures between Kennedy and Scarborough Centre. Dedicated red-painted bus lanes were installed primarily on Kennedy Road for northbound buses and Midland Avenue for southbound buses, together with transit-signal priority and other roadway changes. Bus-terminal capacity was also increased at Kennedy and Scarborough Centre stations, including construction of a temporary bus terminal at Kennedy.

The interim measures had originally been intended to be in place when Line 3 closed on November 19, 2023. However, after a Line 3 train derailed on July 24, 2023, the TTC ended train service permanently several months ahead of schedule and introduced emergency replacement buses in mixed traffic. The first reserved bus lanes entered service on August 26, 2023, before all of the planned transit-priority work had been completed.

The full interim replacement network began on November 19, 2023, with eight TTC bus routes extended from Scarborough Centre to Kennedy station. The arrangement eliminated the need for many passengers travelling from elsewhere in Scarborough to transfer at Scarborough Centre. With the transit-priority measures in place, the TTC estimated that trips between Kennedy and Scarborough Centre would take 17 to 22 minutes, compared with approximately 10 minutes on Line 3.

=== Busway construction ===
Busway construction in July 2026

Work to convert the former Line 3 right-of-way began in August 2024 with removal of rails, power cables, signal equipment and other railway infrastructure between Kennedy and Ellesmere. This early work was completed in December 2024, along with detailed design of the busway. The Transit and Rail Project Assessment Process was also completed in December 2024. The main construction contract was awarded in 2025 and construction subsequently began. The total approved budget for the SRT Bus Replacement Infrastructure project, encompassing the replacement-bus infrastructure and busway program, was $93.8 million.

The busway was initially expected to be completed in 2027, but in December 2025, the TTC announced that construction would be accelerated to allow service to begin by the end of September 2026. On August 20, 2026, the TTC announced that revenue service would begin on September 30, 2026, more than six months earlier than scheduled.

The busway uses the former Line 3 right-of-way from Kennedy to Ellesmere, with intermediate stops at Tara Avenue / Mooregate Avenue and Lawrence East. From Ellesmere, buses use priority bus infrastructure on Ellesmere Road to reach Scarborough Centre and do not serve McCowan. The TTC projected a travel time of approximately 15 minutes between Kennedy and Scarborough Centre, up to seven minutes faster than the interim replacement service. More than 118,000 passengers per week were projected to use the busway. It opened for service on September 30, 2026.

The busway was constructed primarily as an interim rapid-transit facility pending completion of the Scarborough subway extension. City planning documents also contemplated retaining it after the subway opens as additional rapid-transit infrastructure in Scarborough.

The TTC implemented replacement bus service in phases as follows:

Line 3 Scarborough bus replacement service
Effective	Route between Kennedy and Scarborough Centre stations	Travel time (minutes)
July 24 – August 25, 2023	Emergency Line 3 replacement buses operated in mixed traffic via Midland Avenue, Progress Avenue, Brimley Road and Triton Road.	20–30
August 26 – November 18, 2023	Route 903 Scarborough Centre Express operated using temporarily marked reserved lanes, primarily via Kennedy Road northbound and Midland Avenue southbound.	18–25
November 19, 2023 – September 29, 2026	Eight TTC bus routes were extended from Scarborough Centre to Kennedy station. With the full transit-priority measures, buses operated primarily via Kennedy Road northbound and Midland Avenue southbound.	17–22
From September 30, 2026	Buses use the dedicated Scarborough busway along the former Line 3 right-of-way between Kennedy and Ellesmere stations, then priority infrastructure on Ellesmere Road to Scarborough Centre.	15
