= Scarborough subway =

Scarborough subway may refer to either of two components of the Toronto subway system:

- Line 3 Scarborough, a rapid transit line that was in service from 1985 until 2023
- Scarborough subway extension of Line 2 Bloor–Danforth, expected to open in 2033
