= Midland station =

Midland station may refer to:

== United Kingdom ==
- Bedford railway station, previously known as Bedford Midland Road station
- Derby railway station, also known as Derby Midland station
- Leyton Midland Road railway station
- Nottingham station, previously known as Nottingham Midland station
- Midland station, an alternative name for St Pancras railway station
- Sheffield station, previously known as Sheffield Midland station

== Elsewhere ==
- Midland railway station, Perth, Western Australia, Australia
- Midland station (Toronto), a former rapid transit station in Toronto, Ontario, Canada
