= Ellesmere station =

Toronto subway station

Ellesmere
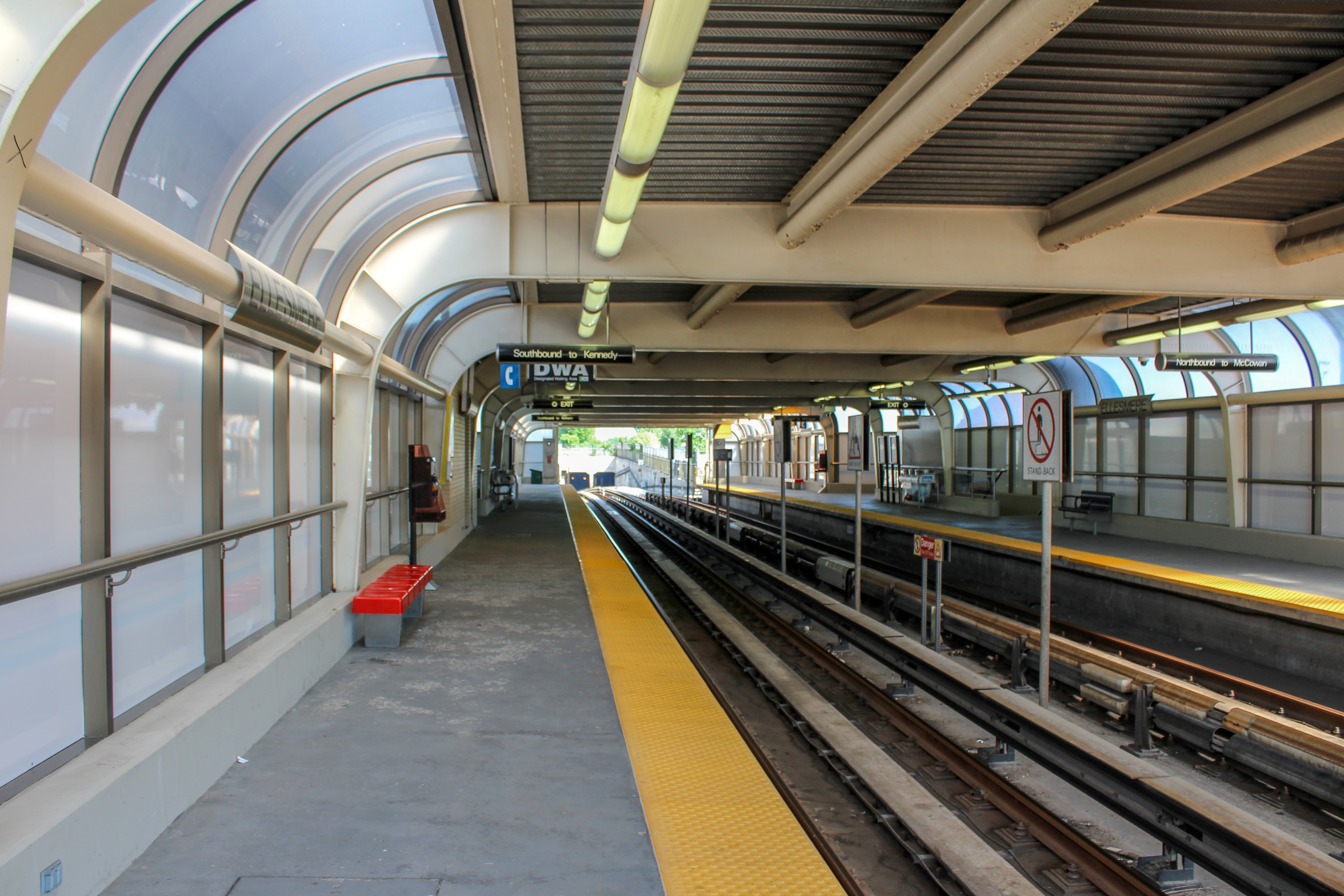
- Former Line 3 platform in 2018

General information
- Location: 1025 Ellesmere Road; Toronto, Ontario; Canada
- Coordinates: 43°46′01″N 79°16′35″W
- Platforms: Side platforms
- Tracks: 2 (Line 3)
- Bus routes: TTC buses: 38 Highland Creek; 129 McCowan North; 131 Nugget; 133 Nielson; 903 Kennedy Stn-Scarborough Express; 904 Sheppard-Kennedy Express; 938 Highland Creek Express; 939 Finch Express
- Bus operators: Toronto Transit Commission

Construction
- Structure type: At grade
- Parking: 68 spaces
- Accessible: Yes

Other information
- Website: Official station page

History
- Opened: March 22, 1985; 41 years ago (rail service); September 30, 2026; 53 days ago (busway stop)
- Closed: July 24, 2023; 3 years ago (rail service)

Passengers
- 2022: 1,068
- Rank: 75 of 75 (2022)
Former services
Preceding station	Toronto Transit Commission	Following station
Lawrence East towards Kennedy	Line 3 Scarborough	Midland towards McCowan
Location

Ellesmere is a bus stop on the Scarborough busway. It was formerly a rapid transit station on Line 3 Scarborough of the Toronto subway in Toronto, Ontario, Canada. It is located below Ellesmere Road, between Kennedy Road and Midland Avenue.

Ellesmere was the least-used station on the entire TTC network. On average, only 1,850 passengers boarded trains here each day from 2006 to 2007 and only 1,678 from 2007 to 2008. Part of the reason for this is that there were no bus bays or bus stops at the station; passengers would have to walk to the nearest bus stop on Ellesmere Road.

== History ==
Ellesmere station opened in 1985, along with the rest of Line 3.

In February 2021, the TTC recommended the closure of Line 3 in 2023 and its replacement by bus service until the completion of the Scarborough extension of Line 2 Bloor–Danforth. The station was permanently closed earlier than expected following a derailment on July 24, 2023.

In September 2026, the Scarborough busway opened for service, and Ellesmere was partially reopened as its northern terminal station. The station building remains closed, excluding the underpass beneath the Stouffville Line tracks to the commuter parking lot. Bus platforms were also added to the west side of the station building.

== Station description ==
The station building is located underneath the elevated section of Ellesmere Road, in the Kennedy Road and Midland Avenue corridor.

Bus platforms can be accessed from the west side of the station building, and serve all routes along the busway, plus a Wheel-Trans stop. Ellesmere is the terminating station of the dedicated busway, before buses continue east along Ellesmere Road towards Scarborough Centre via priority lanes and other transit infrastructure.

The station also has a commuter parking lot for 68 vehicles located just to the east of the station, also underneath the elevated section of Ellesmere Road.

The station building was fairly small and is similar in appearance to Lawrence East station. It was built on two levels, with the ground level being the Line 3 platforms and the single entrance and collector underneath it.

The entrance was accessed from either side of the station through two sets of stairs, from either Kennedy Road or Midland Avenue via Service Road. Since entering the station requires the use of stairs, this station was not accessible whatsoever.

At the time of its closure, 6 TTC bus routes (4 daytime routes and 2 Blue Night routes) passed near the station including routes running along Kennedy Road.

== Rapid transit infrastructure in the vicinity ==
North of this station, the line turned 90° east, dipping briefly into a tunnel to cross underneath the nearby GO train tracks, then rising to an elevated structure for the remainder of its route towards Midland station. South of the station, the line continued to travel at ground level alongside the GO train tracks for the remainder of the route towards Lawrence East station.

== Planned busway stop ==
The TTC replaced a section of the Line 3 right-of-way with a busway between Kennedy and Ellesmere stations. According to a 2022 TTC report, the adjacent station's facilities would be retained along with a pedestrian underpass for the local community to use. Buses serve customers at new stops on multiple sides of the former station. The busway stop opened on September 30, 2026.

== Surface connections ==
Ellesmere station serves as the northernmost stop of the Scarborough busway. The other routes use curbside stops on the street, and a transfer is required to connect between train and bus routes.

TTC routes serving the station include:

Route	Name	Additional information
95A/B	York Mills	Westbound to York Mills station
95A	York Mills	Eastbound to Sheppard Avenue East and Port Union Road
95B	York Mills	Eastbound to U of T Scarborough
995	York Mills Express	Eastbound to U of T Scarborough and westbound to York Mills station (Weekday service)
395	York Mills	Blue Night service; eastbound to Meadowvale Road and Sheppard Avenue East and westbound to York Mills station
