= Lawrence East station =

Toronto subway station

Lawrence East
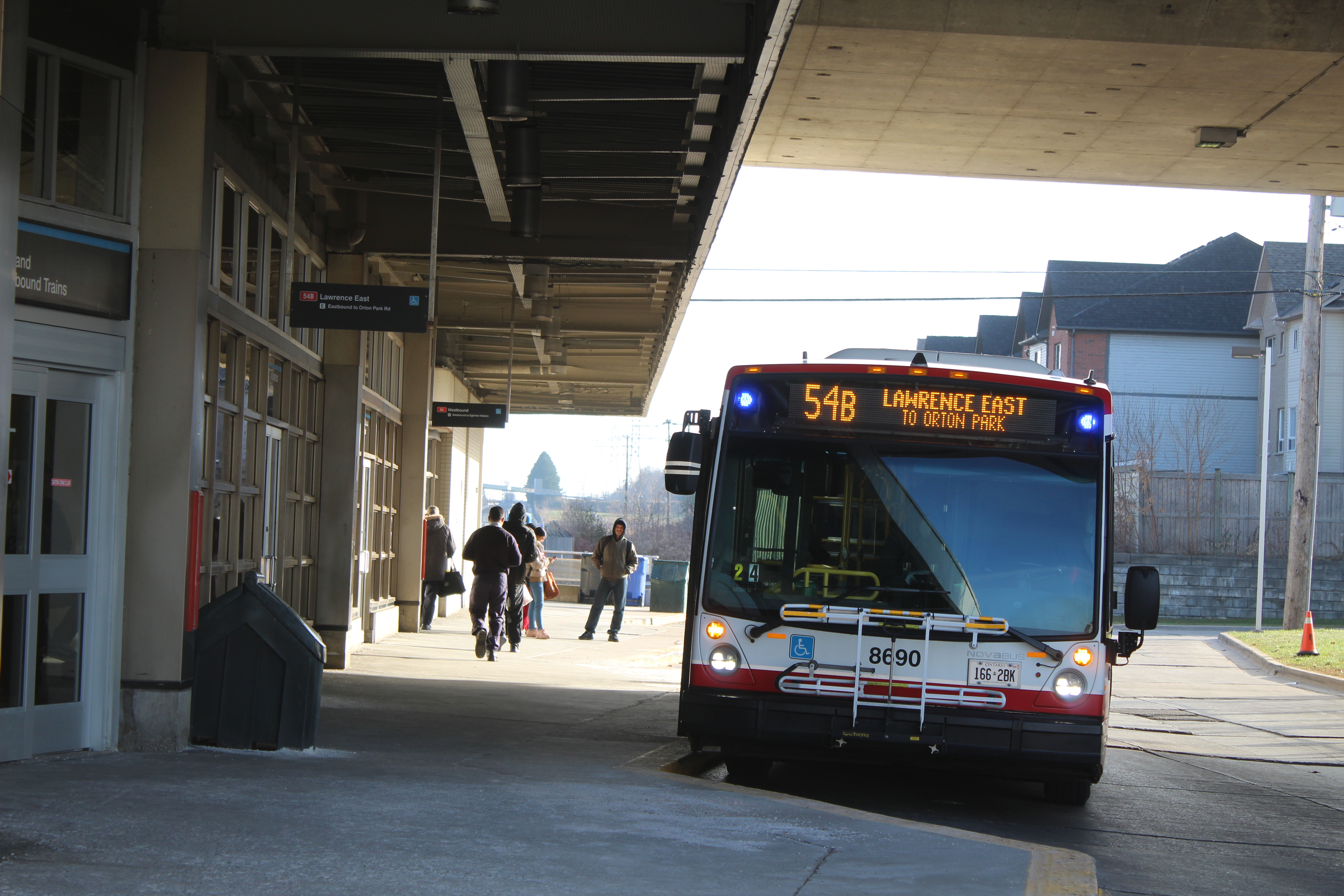
- Lawrence East bus platform

General information
- Location: 2444 Lawrence Avenue East; Toronto, Ontario; Canada
- Coordinates: 43°45′01″N 79°16′13″W
- Platforms: Side platforms
- Tracks: 2 (Line 3)
- Bus routes: TTC buses: 38 Highland Creek; 54 Lawrence East; 129 McCowan North; 131 Nugget; 133 Nielson; 154 Curran Hall; 903 Kennedy Stn-Scarborough Express; 904 Sheppard-Kennedy Express; 938 Highland Creek Express; 939 Finch Express; 954 Lawrence East Express
- Bus operators: Toronto Transit Commission

Construction
- Structure type: At-grade
- Parking: 90 spaces
- Accessible: Yes (southbound platform); No (northbound platform)

Other information
- Website: Official station page

History
- Opened: March 22, 1985; 41 years ago (rail service); September 30, 2026; 53 days ago (busway stop)
- Closed: July 24, 2023; 3 years ago (rail service)

Passengers
- 2022: 8,968
- Rank: 64 of 75 (2022)
Former services
Preceding station	Toronto Transit Commission	Following station
Kennedy Terminus	Line 3 Scarborough	Ellesmere towards McCowan
Location

Lawrence East is a bus stop on the Scarborough busway. It previously served as a rapid transit station on Line 3 Scarborough of the Toronto subway until the line's closure on July 24, 2023. Prior to the decommissioning of Line 3, it was the third-busiest Line 3 station, after Kennedy and Scarborough Centre.

A new Lawrence East station is planned to be built along the planned Line 2 extension on the southwest corner of Lawrence Avenue East and McCowan Road and is scheduled to open circa 2030.

== History ==
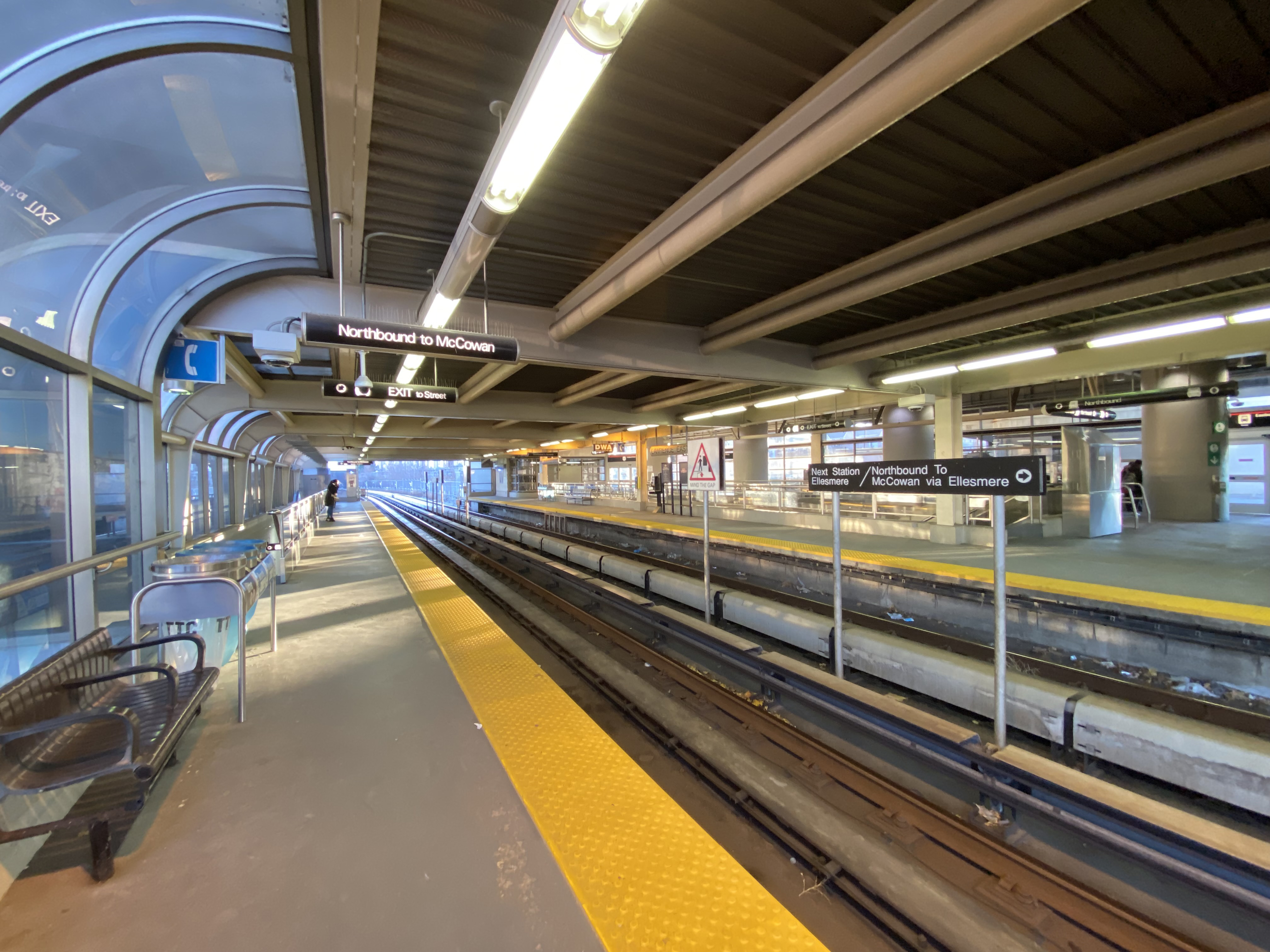
Former Line 3 platforms at Lawrence East in 2022

Lawrence East opened in 1985, along with the rest of Line 3. All bus routes that operated along Lawrence Avenue East at the time were rerouted to serve the station on March 23, 1985, one day after the opening.

The station was renovated between 2011 and 2012 to include automated sliding doors, allowing the southbound platform and the bus platform to be accessible.

In February 2021, the TTC recommended the closure of Line 3 in 2023 and its replacement by bus service until the completion of the Scarborough extension of Line 2 Bloor–Danforth. However, the rail portion of this station permanently closed following a derailment on July 24, 2023. A new Lawrence East station is planned to be built along the planned Line 2 extension on the southwest corner of Lawrence Avenue East and McCowan Road and is scheduled to open circa 2030.

In September 2026, the Scarborough busway opened for service, and Lawrence East was partially reopened for service as a stop along it. The station building remains closed, as buses board outside the station on new dedicated platforms.

== Station description ==
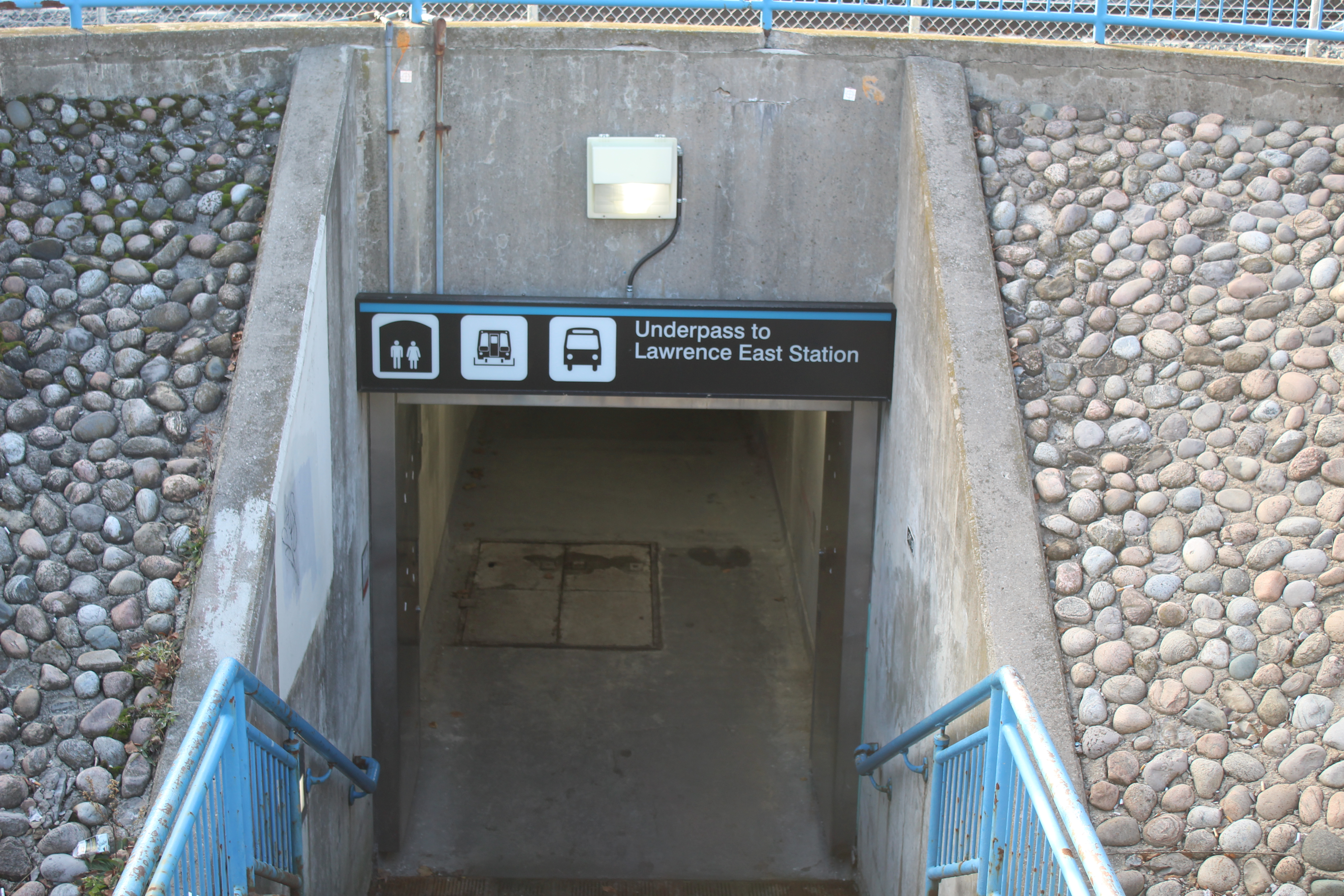
Entrance to the underpass east of the station

The small station was built on two levels. The Line 3 platforms, bus platforms, and only entrance were located on ground level. The entrance was an automatic sliding door facing north with a sidewalk connecting to Lawrence Avenue East to the west side, and an underpass underneath both the Line 3 and GO rails towards the commuter parking lot, Access Road, and Prudential Drive. Below ground level in the interior of the station was an underpass connecting the entrance to the northbound platforms through the means of stairs and escalators.

This station was a "partially accessible" station, as all services within the station, except for the northbound platform, were accessible. The TTC suggested that people in need of accessible service onto the northbound platform take Line 3 southbound to Kennedy station and double back to Lawrence East. An accessible fare gate was also available inside the station at the main fare booth.

The station has a bus terminal located underneath the elevated portion of Lawrence Avenue East, in the Midland Avenue and Kennedy Road corridor. At the time of its closure, five TTC bus routes (three daytime routes and two Blue Night routes) served or passed near the station, including routes running along Kennedy Road. After the Line 3 closure, the 954 Lawrence East Express bus continued to turn back at Lawrence East station until October 9, 2023, when it was briefly rerouted to terminate at Kennedy station.

With the opening of the Scarborough busway, new busway platforms opened on the south side of the station building. Additionally, service to the bus loop on the 54/954 route was restored, along with the Wheel-Trans stop.

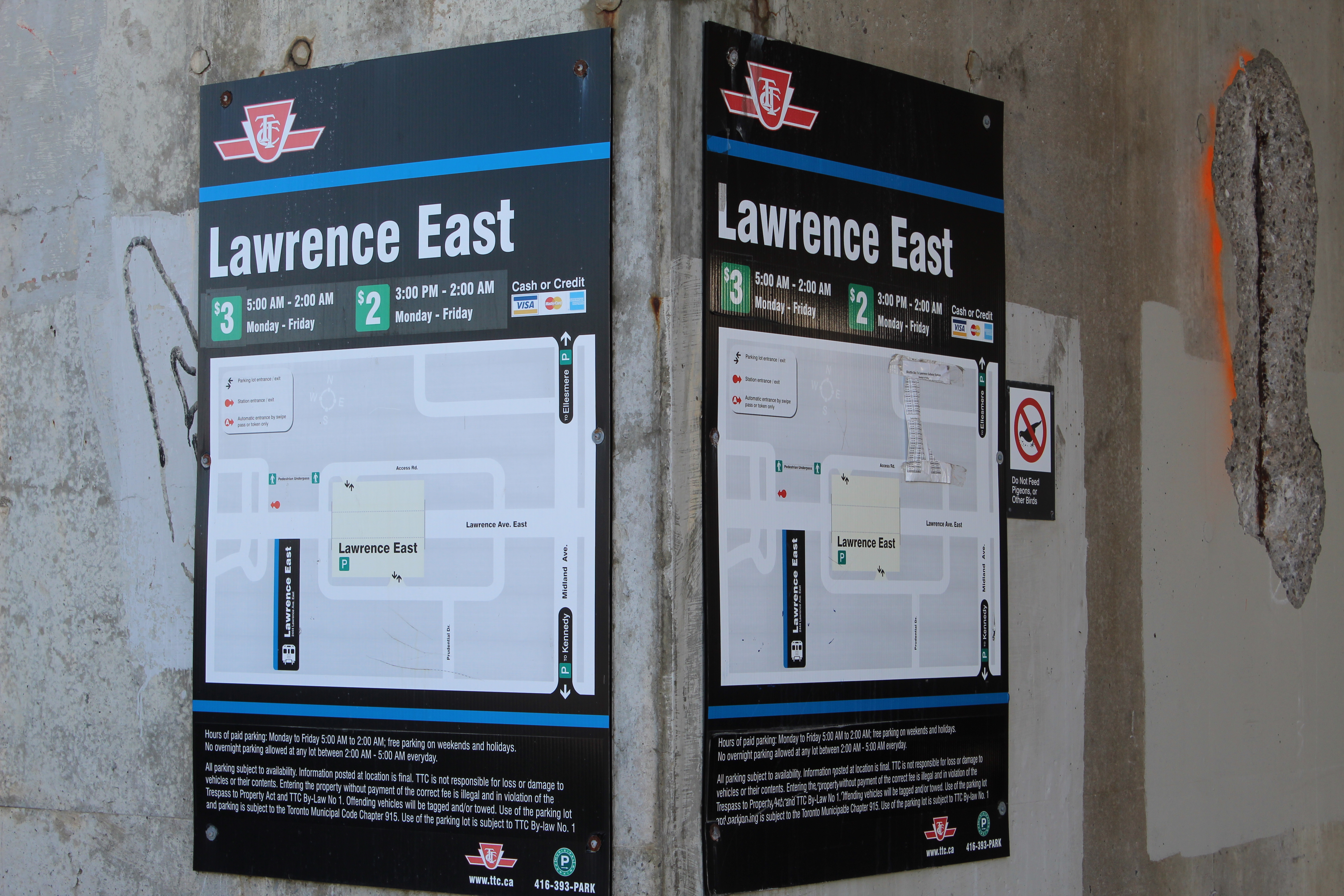
Parking sign at Lawrence East station

A commuter parking lot for up to 90 vehicles is located just east of the station, also underneath the elevated section of Lawrence Avenue East. Parking is managed by the Toronto Parking Authority.

== Rapid transit infrastructure in the vicinity ==
Line 3 continued to travel on ground level, straight north after Lawrence East station, running parallel to the nearby railway tracks. South of the station, the line continued to travel on ground level but became elevated shortly before reaching Kennedy station, where it made a 90-degree turn.

== Busway stop ==
The TTC replaced part of the Line 3 right-of-way with a busway between Kennedy and Ellesmere stations. According to a 2022 TTC report, the adjacent station's bus facilities would be retained along with a pedestrian underpass for the local community to use. Buses would serve customers at new stops on the south side of the former station. The busway stop opened on September 30, 2026.

== Future replacement station ==
The provincial transit agency Metrolinx is building a new subway station on Lawrence Avenue East, approximately 2 kilometres (1.2 mi) east of the former Line 3 station. The underground station will be parallel to McCowan Road along a planned extension of Line 2 Bloor–Danforth. It will be on a north–south alignment to the west of the Scarborough General Hospital and the new bus terminal will be located on McCowan Road west of Lawrence Avenue East. The new station and bus terminal are expected to open in 2030.

== Surface connections ==
The bus platform is located at the west side of the station. When line 3 was permanently closed, buses did not enter the station. Then buses are back once busway is in service.

TTC routes serving the station include:

Bay number	Route	Name	Additional information
1	Wheel-Trans		
2	54	Lawrence East	Westbound to Don Valley station
2	954	Lawrence East Express	Westbound to Don Valley station (Rush-hour service)
3	54B	Lawrence East	Eastbound to Morningside Avenue
3	154	Curran Hall	Eastbound to Conlins Road
4	54A	Lawrence East	Eastbound to Starspray Boulevard
4	954	Lawrence East Express	Eastbound to Starspray Boulevard (Rush-hour service)
—	154	Curran Hall	Westbound to Kennedy station
—	354	Lawrence East	Blue Night service; eastbound to Starspray Boulevard and westbound to Eglinton station
