= Midland station (Toronto) =

Toronto subway station

Midland
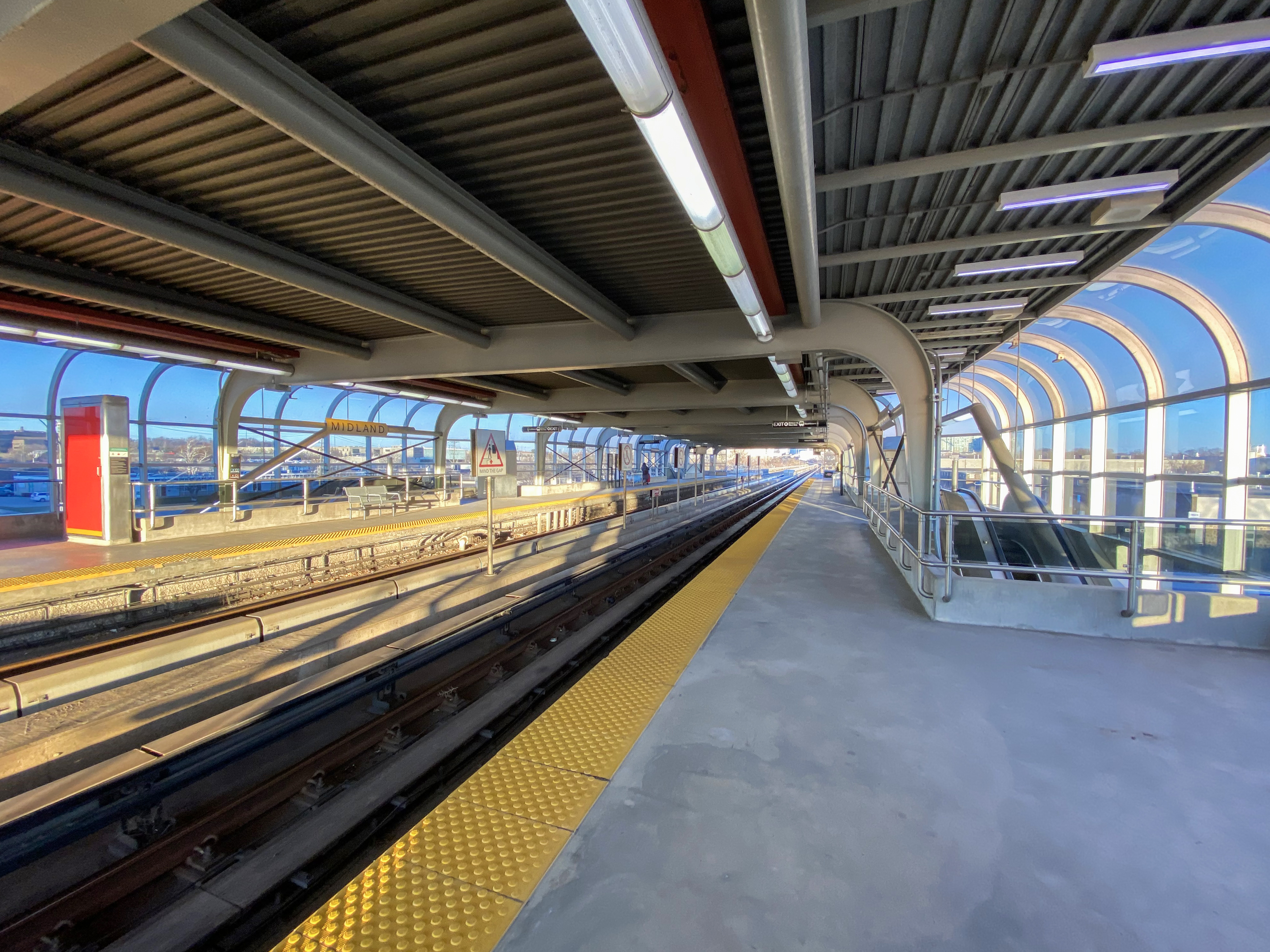
- Midland station platform in 2022

General information
- Location: 2085 Midland Avenue, Toronto, Ontario; Canada
- Coordinates: 43°46′13.5″N 79°16′19″W
- Platforms: Side platforms
- Tracks: 2
- Connections: 57 Midland

Construction
- Structure type: Elevated
- Accessible: No

Other information
- Website: Official station page

History
- Opened: March 22, 1985; 41 years ago
- Closed: July 24, 2023; 3 years ago

Passengers
- 2022: 1,293
- Rank: 74 of 75 (2022)

Services
Preceding station	Toronto Transit Commission	Following station
Ellesmere towards Kennedy	Line 3 Scarborough	Scarborough Centre towards McCowan
Location

Midland was a rapid transit station on Line 3 Scarborough of the Toronto subway in Toronto, Ontario, Canada. It is located on Midland Avenue between Ellesmere Road and Progress Avenue.

== History ==
Midland station opened in 1985, along with the rest of the Scarborough line.

In February 2021, the Toronto Transit Commission (TTC) recommended the closure of Line 3 in 2023 and its replacement by bus service until the completion of the Scarborough extension of Line 2 Bloor–Danforth. Line 3 was set to close in November 2023. The station was permanently closed earlier than expected on July 24, 2023, following a derailment which ultimately resulted in the TTC deciding to end Line 3 service early.

== Station description ==
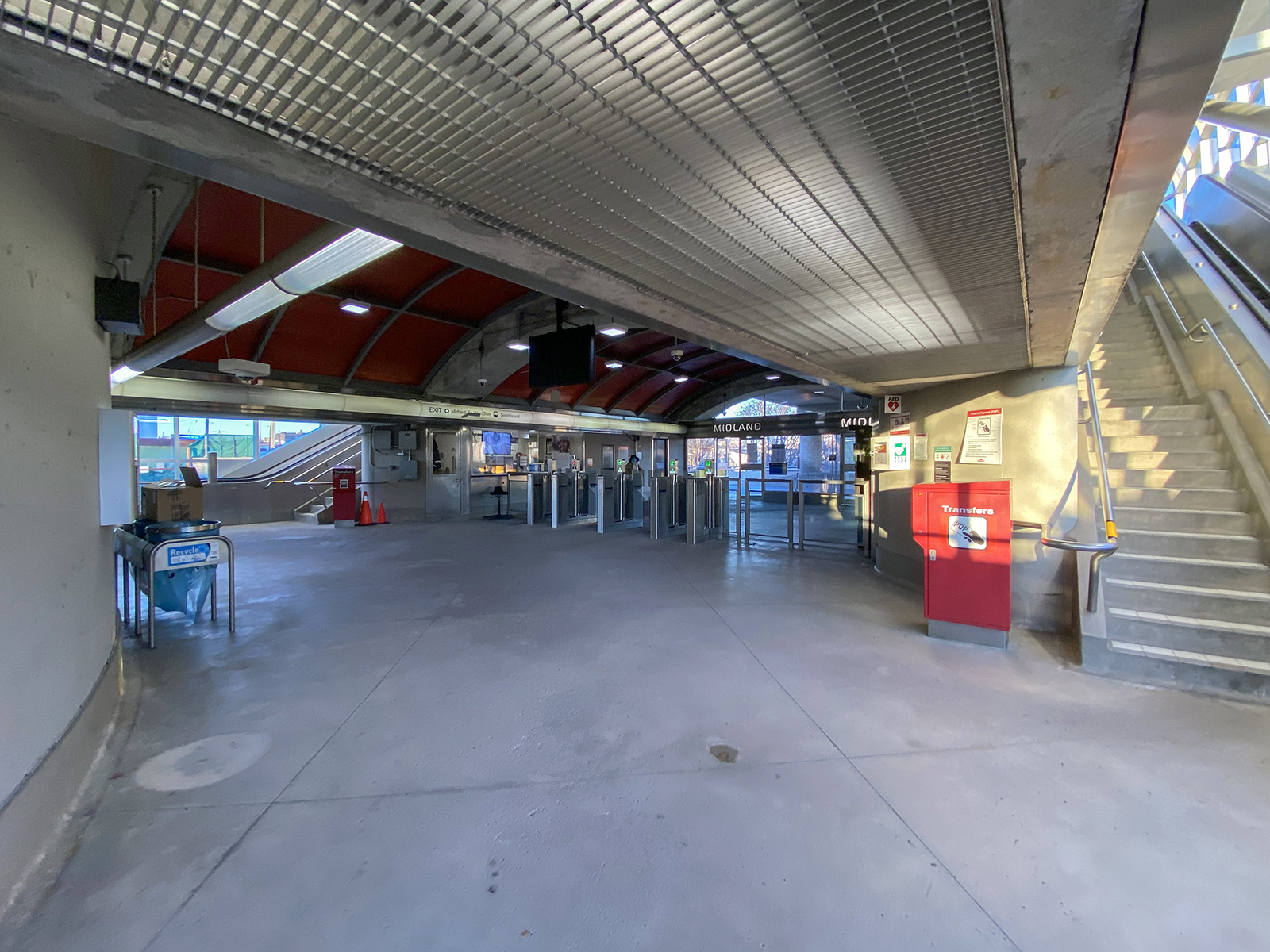
Station concourse

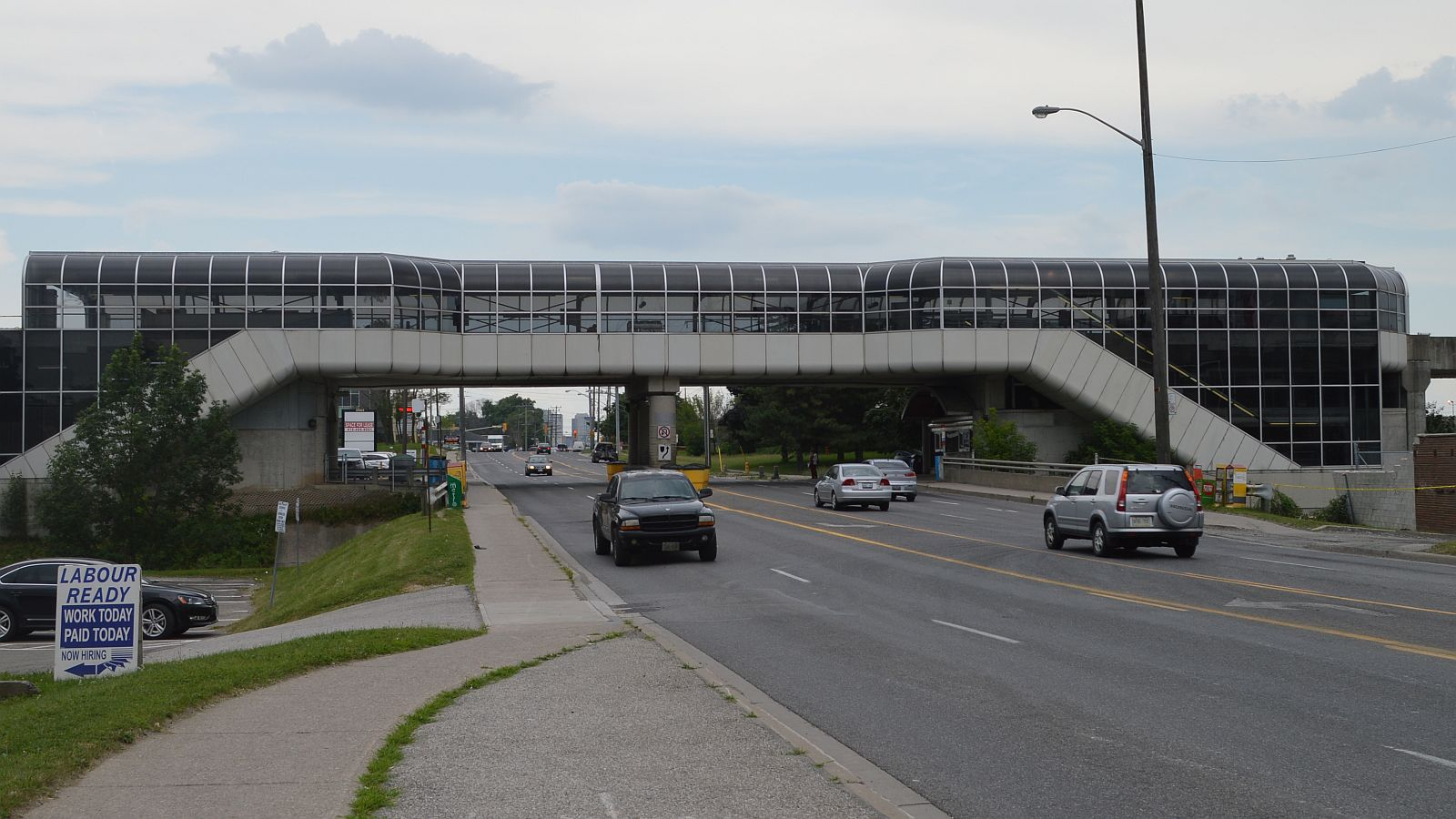
Exterior of the station in 2013

The station is located beside and above Midland Avenue, between Ellesmere Road and Progress Avenue. The station was fairly small compared to the other stations on the Scarborough RT line. It was built on two levels, with the two entrances on either side of Midland Avenue, as well as the collector and bus stops on ground level, and the Line 3 platforms on the level above. The east side entrance to the station was an unstaffed automatic entrance with entry only by Presto card.

The station served TTC bus routes running along Midland Avenue, Ellesmere Road and Progress Avenue, but only the 57 Midland bus stopped in front of the station. At the time of its closure, 5 TTC bus routes (4 daytime routes and 1 Blue Night route) passed by or near the station.

== Rapid transit infrastructure in the vicinity ==
East of the station, the Line 3 trains continued to run elevated above the ground, and the elevation of the bridge increased as the tracks went further east towards Scarborough Centre station. West of the station, the line gradually descended until reaching a tunnel where it made a 90 degree turn south and it reached Ellesmere station as soon as it exited the tunnel.

== Nearby landmarks ==
At the time of its closing, the station was next to an Atlantic Packaging facility.
