= Scarborough subway extension =

Future Toronto subway extension

- Sheppard/McCowan station under construction in 2026

Overview
- Status: Under construction
- Owner: Metrolinx
- Locale: Scarborough, Ontario
- Stations: 3

Service
- Type: Rapid transit
- System: Toronto subway
- Operator: Toronto Transit Commission

History
- Planned opening: 2033

Technical
- Line length: 7.8 km (4.8 mi)
- Track gauge: 4 ft 10 7/8 in (1,495 mm) Toronto gauge
Route map
Superimposed former Line 3 Scarborough (grey) and the under-construction Line 2 extension (dark green)

The Scarborough subway extension (SSE) is an under-construction extension of Line 2 Bloor–Danforth northeast from its existing terminus at Kennedy station along McCowan Road to three new stations at Lawrence Avenue, Scarborough Centre, and Sheppard Avenue. It will replace Line 3 Scarborough (the Scarborough RT), which ran to Scarborough City Centre and closed in 2023. The extension is expected to open in 2033. It is part of the Toronto subway system.

In the 2000s, proposals for the aging Scarborough RT included replacement with either a subway extension or light rail line, or refurbishing the line. The light rail proposal was part of then-mayor David Miller's Transit City plan. Following the plan's cancellation by Mayor Rob Ford, the project was instead included as part of the Eglinton Crosstown light rail project. This plan was cancelled by the Ontario government in 2013 in favour of a three-stop subway extension, which was reduced to one stop in 2016 before a new three-stop plan was announced by Premier Doug Ford, brother of Rob Ford, in 2019.

== Early history ==
In 1983, there was discussion of a rapid transit extension from Kennedy station to Scarborough City Centre. As multiple types of technologies were examined many politicians requested a subway extension instead of the then-proposed streetcar line. Instead, a medium-capacity rail system, known as the Scarborough RT (later renamed Line 3 Scarborough), was built.

In 2005, Toronto City Council again proposed extending the line northeastward as a replacement for the aging Scarborough RT. In 2006, this proposal was then altered when Scarborough councillors agreed to support plans to refurbish the existing line using other light-metro options for Scarborough. Using heavy-rail rapid transit like the rest of the Toronto subway in Scarborough had not yet been examined.

== Planning ==
=== Light rail proposal (2007–2013) ===
In 2007, Mayor David Miller included the refurbishment of the Scarborough RT using modern light rail transit as part of his Transit City plan. The light rail line would have run between Kennedy station and Sheppard Avenue East via Scarborough Town Centre. The line would have used the right-of-way of the Scarborough RT, which would have been shut down for conversion to light rail, requiring bus substitution (which ended up occurring in the 2020s during the construction of the Line 2 extension). Construction would have lasted three-and-a-half to five years and cost about $2 billion, plus an unknown amount to redesign the connection at Kennedy station.

During his 2010 mayoralty campaign, Rob Ford denounced the idea of light rail transit and instead proposed replacing the Scarborough RT with an extension of the Bloor–Danforth line. However, on March 31, 2011, Ford agreed with the provincial government that the province's Metrolinx agency would convert the Scarborough RT to light rail as part of the proposed Eglinton Crosstown line project (now Line 5 Eglinton) over the Line 3 right-of-way instead. In June 2012, the idea of a Scarborough subway extension was a key part of Toronto's proposed OneCity transit plan. This plan was later rejected by the provincial government and Ford. Ford rejected the LRT plan, claiming it would create traffic congestion despite the fact that the RT had its own corridor at the time and would not interfere with traffic. Toronto City Hall paid $74 million to cancel the project.

=== Initial three-stop proposal (2013–2016) ===
On September 4, 2013, the province of Ontario under Premier Kathleen Wynne decided to extend the Bloor–Danforth subway after all and announced that it would fund two-thirds of the 6.4 kilometres (4.0 mi) extension from Kennedy to Scarborough City Centre at Scarborough Centre station. The federal government committed to funding the remaining one-third. Toronto City Council approved the extension by a vote of 24–20 on October 8, 2013. The subway route would extend eastward towards McCowan Road, via Eglinton Avenue and Danforth Road, and proceed north towards the intersection of McCowan Road and Sheppard Avenue, via Scarborough City Centre. There would be three new stations at Lawrence Avenue East (serving the Scarborough General Hospital), Scarborough Town Centre and Sheppard Avenue East. The city would also raise property taxes annually over the next three years to help fund the project. Construction was expected to begin as early as 2018, with a completion within five years. As a result of the extension's approval, the Eglinton Crosstown line would be cut back to Kennedy station as its eastern terminus. It was later designated Line 5 Eglinton.

In December 2014, Councillor Glenn De Baeremaeker, one of the city's deputy mayors, proposed a fourth stop along the extension, at Danforth Road and Eglinton Avenue, to reduce the station spacing between Kennedy station and the next stop from about 4 km (2.5 mi) to 2 km (1.2 mi). At that time, he was told the extra station would add $100 million to $150 million to the cost of the extension.

However, a subsequent city staff report indicated that the proposed stations at Lawrence Avenue and at Sheppard Avenue had "little development potential" nearby and were too close to planned SmartTrack stations.

In 2016, when this proposal was abandoned, about five percent of the design was complete, and the cost was estimated at between $4.6 billion and $6.9 billion.

=== One-stop proposal (2016–2019) ===
On January 20, 2016, city staff issued a proposal to eliminate two of the three stops on the planned Scarborough subway extension and to terminate Line 2 Bloor–Danforth at Scarborough Town Centre. The planned intermediate stop at Lawrence Avenue would be eliminated along with the proposed stretch to Sheppard Avenue. This revised plan would prevent the subway from competing for ridership with SmartTrack's branch to Markham. Also, the proposed change was to reduce the cost of the extension from $3.5 billion to $2.5 billion, where the $1 billion saved would be used to extend Line 5 Eglinton east- and northwards to University of Toronto Scarborough. However, most of the $1 billion saved was subsequently diverted back to the SSE to cover additional estimated construction costs for the one-stop subway.

City planning staff estimated that the peak ridership of the one-stop extension would be 7,300 in the peak hour and peak direction, about half of the 15,000 peak ridership considered as the minimum required to justify a subway. With the original three-stop extension, the peak ridership estimate was 9,500 to 14,000; however, that estimate was reduced to 7,300 because of competition from the proposed SmartTrack and by the elimination of two of the three original stops. Mayor John Tory and Scarborough Councillor Glenn De Baeremaeker said a peak ridership of 7,300 would have still been acceptable as it was still greater than the 6,000 peak at terminal station Kipling. However, a Toronto Star article pointed out there would be only one station within 6 kilometres of Scarborough Town Centre but more stations are within 6 kilometres of other terminal stations to boost ridership. The SSE would have carried an estimated 31,000 riders per day as compared to 66,355 riders from Kipling to Jane (five stations) and 96,660 riders from Finch to York Mills (four stations). The SSE would have performed better in ridership only against the terminal of the underperforming Sheppard line.

In June 2016, the estimated cost of the one-stop SSE was revised from $2 billion to $2.9 billion because tunnels needed to be deeper than expected in some places, with the new terminal station being 45 to 90 per cent deeper. An additional cost factor was that a high water table would require more concrete. There was also a $300 million maintenance cost to keep Line 3 Scarborough operating until the SSE's opening resulting in a total project cost of $3.2 billion.

In February 2017, city staff reported that the estimated cost of the extension would increase by $150 million to $3.35 billion in order to build a 34-bay bus terminal at Scarborough Town Centre, which was to be the largest bus terminal of the TTC system. Also, the projection for new riders for the extension was revised downwards to 2,300 per day, down from the 4,500 new riders estimated in mid-2016.

In March 2017, city staff estimated the extension would take six years to construct, with an expected opening in the second quarter of 2026. The project was funded. On March 28, 2017, city council approved the design of the 6.2-kilometre (3.9 mi) extension via McCowan Road.

According to transit advocate Steve Munro, the SSE would have been built to use only automatic train control (ATC). This would preclude the operation of T1 subway cars on the extension as it would have been too expensive to convert T1 cars to ATC.

In April 2019, city staff revised estimates for the SSE project, by then known as the Line 2 East Extension (L2EE), to a total of $3.87 billion with a completion date estimated at the end of 2027 and a delayed opening date of 2030 for the bus terminal at Scarborough Centre. In addition, plans for the extension to run ATC upon opening were dropped and instead replaced with the inclusion of "enabling works" allowing for ATC to be implemented at a later date.

=== Revised three-stop proposal (2019–present) ===
In May 2018, Rob Ford's brother Doug Ford – during his campaign to become premier of Ontario – pledged to work on and pay for the three-stop proposal. In July 2018, the TTC was still focused on building the one-stop proposal.

On April 10, 2019, Doug Ford, who had since become premier, announced that the province would revert the extension project back to the three-stop proposal at an estimated cost of $5.5 billion with an estimated completion date between 2029 and 2030. As with the three-stop proposal of 2013–2016, there would be three new stations located along McCowan Road at Lawrence Avenue, Scarborough Town Centre and Sheppard Avenue East.

In February 2020, Metrolinx released a cost–benefit analysis showing that the $5.5-billion project cost for the three-stop extension was double the estimated benefits of $2.8 billion over 60 years. Benefits included reducing travel time and cars on the road. Metrolinx CEO Phil Verster said the estimate of benefits was conservative and Metrolinx may be able to improve the benefits over time. By 2025, the estimated cost of the extension had grown to $10.2 billion.

In May 2026, internal TTC documents obtained by the Toronto Star through a freedom-of-information request indicated that TTC staff were using an internal planning date of 2033 for the opening of the Scarborough subway extension, despite the project's public opening date remaining 2030. According to the article, the delay was linked in part to technical challenges encountered by the tunnel boring machine during excavation work, as well as rising construction costs.

== Design and construction ==
=== Advance tunnel ===
On March 10, 2020, Metrolinx and Infrastructure Ontario issued a request for qualifications (RFQ) related to advance tunnelling works. On August 20, 2020, Metrolinx issued a request for proposals to shortlisted proponents, including Acciona, East End Connectors (Dragados, Aecon and Ghella) and Strabag. A launch shaft would be constructed at the northeast corner of Sheppard Avenue East and McCowan Road, with an extraction shaft along Eglinton Avenue on the east side of Midland Avenue. On May 25, 2021, Strabag was selected to design, build and finance the tunnel. The scope of the advance tunnel contract included the following:

- tunnelling works for the 7.8-kilometre (4.8 mi) subway extension, from Kennedy station to McCowan Road / Sheppard Avenue
- design and construction of launch and extraction shafts, tunnels, as well as headwalls for emergency exit buildings and stations
- supply of tunnel boring machines and installation of segmental pre-cast concrete tunnel liners
- activities necessary to build the tunnel (e.g. utility relocations, supports for shaft and headwalls, temporary power supply, lighting, ventilation, and drainage)

Construction on the extension began on June 23, 2021. The SSE tunnel will contain two tracks within a single bore of 10.7 metres (35 ft) in diameter and will be the largest heavy-rail subway tunnel by diameter in Toronto (although there are wider sections of mined light-rail tunnels containing a third centre track along Line 5 Eglinton). The tunnel boring machine (TBM) was built by Herrenknecht in Schwanau, Germany. Arriving in early 2022, the TBM was transported via sea in multiple shipments for reassembly at the launch site. By January 2023, the TBM (named "Diggy Scardust" after Ziggy Stardust, musician David Bowie's stage persona and fictional character) had started tunnelling at a speed of 10–15 metres (33–49 ft) per day. It is boring 6.9 kilometres (4.3 mi) of the 7.8-kilometre (4.8 mi) tunnel.

=== Stations, rails and systems ===
The stations, rails and systems (SRS) contract will be delivered using a progressive design–build delivery strategy. In September 2021, Metrolinx and Infrastructure Ontario released an RFQ to shortlist potential bidders. In February 2022, following the close of the RFQ process, Metrolinx and Infrastructure Ontario released an RFP to three shortlisted bidders: Dragados (including AECOM), KSX Integrated Design-Builders (Kiewit and SNC-Lavalin), and Scarborough Transit Connect (Aecon, FCC Construcción, and Mott MacDonald). In November 2022, Metrolinx and Infrastructure Ontario announced that Scarborough Transit Connect was the successful bidder and would work with the province over an 18- to 24-month development phase to finalize the scope, risk allocation, project costs and project schedule. Once the development phase had concluded, Metrolinx would have the option to execute the project agreement with the development partner to proceed to construction, which would include agreements on detailed designs and the final negotiated price. The scope of the SRS contract included the following:

- a 7.8-kilometre (4.8 mi) eastward extension of Line 2 Bloor–Danforth subway
- Tunnelling work for the length of the alignment
- Three new stations: Lawrence Avenue and McCowan Road, Scarborough Centre, and a terminal station at McCowan Road and Sheppard Avenue with a proposed connection to Line 4 Sheppard
- Emergency exit buildings, traction power substations, and modifications at Kennedy station
- Transit connections to existing TTC Line 2 Bloor–Danforth, Line 5 Eglinton, GO train service (Stouffville line), and Durham Region Transit (DRT) bus service
- Operating systems for the extension

== New stations ==
The northern terminus of the extension will be at Sheppard Avenue East and McCowan Road; it will have an adjacent TTC bus terminal as well as a pick-up and drop-off area. The station entrance will be at Sheppard Avenue and McCowan Road. The station design will provide for future extension of Line 4 Sheppard to terminate at this station, as well as further expansion of Line 2 north of the station. Besides TTC buses, the bus terminal will also serve Durham Region Transit and York Region Transit buses.

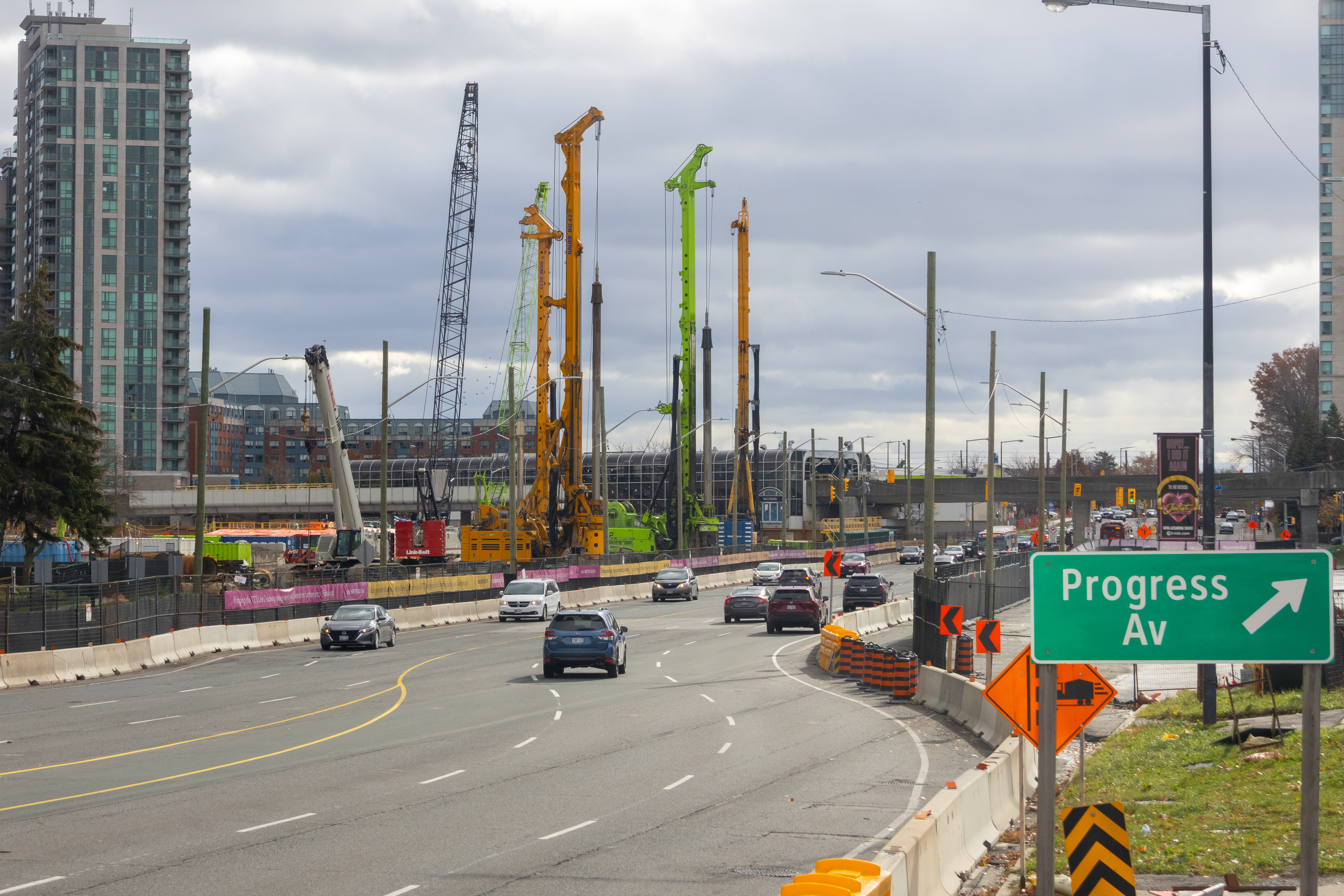
Construction site of the future Scarborough Centre station along McCowan Road in November 2025. The former McCowan station of Line 3 can be seen in the background.

The future Scarborough Centre station will be located on McCowan Road at a different location from the existing Scarborough Centre station, which will be decommissioned. The new station facilities will be on the north side of McCowan station (also to be decommissioned) and will occupy most of the block bounded by McCowan Road, Progress Avenue, Grangeway Avenue and Busby Drive. The main entrance will be near McCowan Road and Progress Avenue. The new station will have a new Scarborough Centre Bus Terminal serving TTC, GO Transit and Durham Region Transit buses. The bus terminal will be the western terminus of the planned Durham–Scarborough bus rapid transit corridor. The station will also have a pick-up and drop-off area.

A third new, future Lawrence East station will be located beside the Scarborough General Hospital at the northwest corner of Lawrence Avenue East and McCowan Road in a different location from the former Lawrence East station by the Stouffville line. There will be entrances at the northwest and southwest corners of Lawrence Avenue and McCowan Road. There will be a bus terminal on the south side of Lawrence Avenue between Valparaiso Avenue and McCowan Road.

== See also ==
- Scarborough busway
