= McCowan station =

Toronto subway station

McCowan
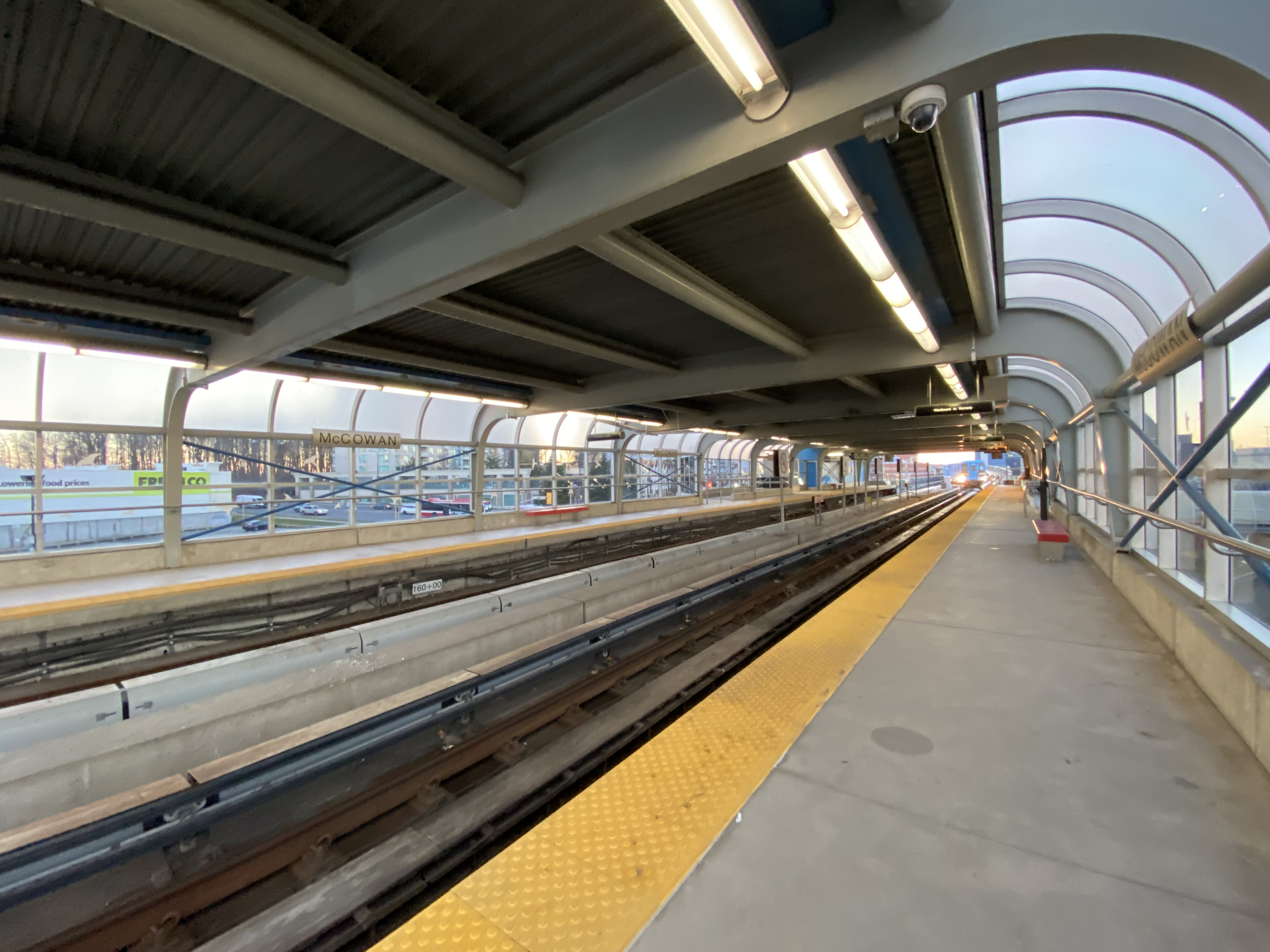
- Station platform

General information
- Location: 1275 McCowan Road; Toronto, Ontario; Canada
- Coordinates: 43°46′29.7″N 79°15′06″W
- Platforms: Side platforms
- Tracks: 2
- Connections: TTC buses: 9 Bellamy; 16 McCowan; 38 Highland Creek; 129 McCowan North; 130 Middlefield; 131 Nugget; 132 Milner; 133 Neilson; 134 Progress; 169 Huntingwood; 302 Kingston Rd - McCowan; 913 Progress Express; DRT

Construction
- Structure type: Elevated
- Accessible: No

Other information
- Website: Official station page

History
- Opened: March 22, 1985; 41 years ago
- Closed: July 24, 2023; 3 years ago

Passengers
- 2022: 2,331
- Rank: 73 of 75 (2022)

Services
Preceding station	Toronto Transit Commission	Following station
Scarborough Centre towards Kennedy	Line 3 Scarborough	Terminus
Location

McCowan was a terminal station on Line 3 Scarborough of the Toronto subway. The closed station is located at 1275 McCowan Road, just north of Ellesmere Road at Bushby Drive/Town Centre Court.

In February 2021, the Toronto Transit Commission (TTC) recommended the closure of Line 3 in November 2023 and its replacement by bus service until the completion of the Scarborough extension of Line 2 Bloor–Danforth. However, this station permanently closed following a derailment on July 24, 2023, after which the TTC decided not to reopen Line 3 service.

== Station description ==
The station structure was built on three levels: Line 3 was on the upper floor, an automatic entrance from the Consilium Place office complex via the Pedway pedestrian walkway was on the second floor, and the station entrance from McCowan Road with the collector and the concourse was on the lower floor. At the time of its closure, 15 TTC bus routes (13 daytime routes and 2 Blue Night routes) plus one Durham Region Transit bus route passed by McCowan station.

== Rapid transit infrastructure in the vicinity ==
McCowan station was the terminus station of Line 3 and lay just west of McCowan Yard (completed in 1983), which stored and maintained Line 3's trains.

Trains used a double crossover before the station entrance, but only one side of the station was used. In earlier years both platforms were used for line-end and westbound trains, but the double crossover allowed eastbound trains to cross over to the westbound platform, making for a more efficient system. The eastbound track was used when taking trains out of service. This allowed the operator to ensure that the train was empty with no one boarding before bringing the train to McCowan Yard.

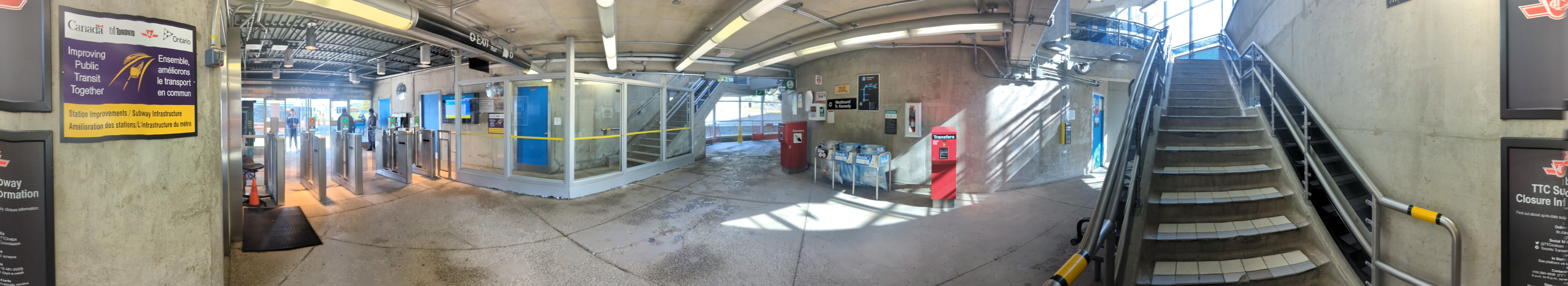
Concourse of the station
