= Toronto Transit Commission incidents =

Major incidents involving the Toronto Transit Commission

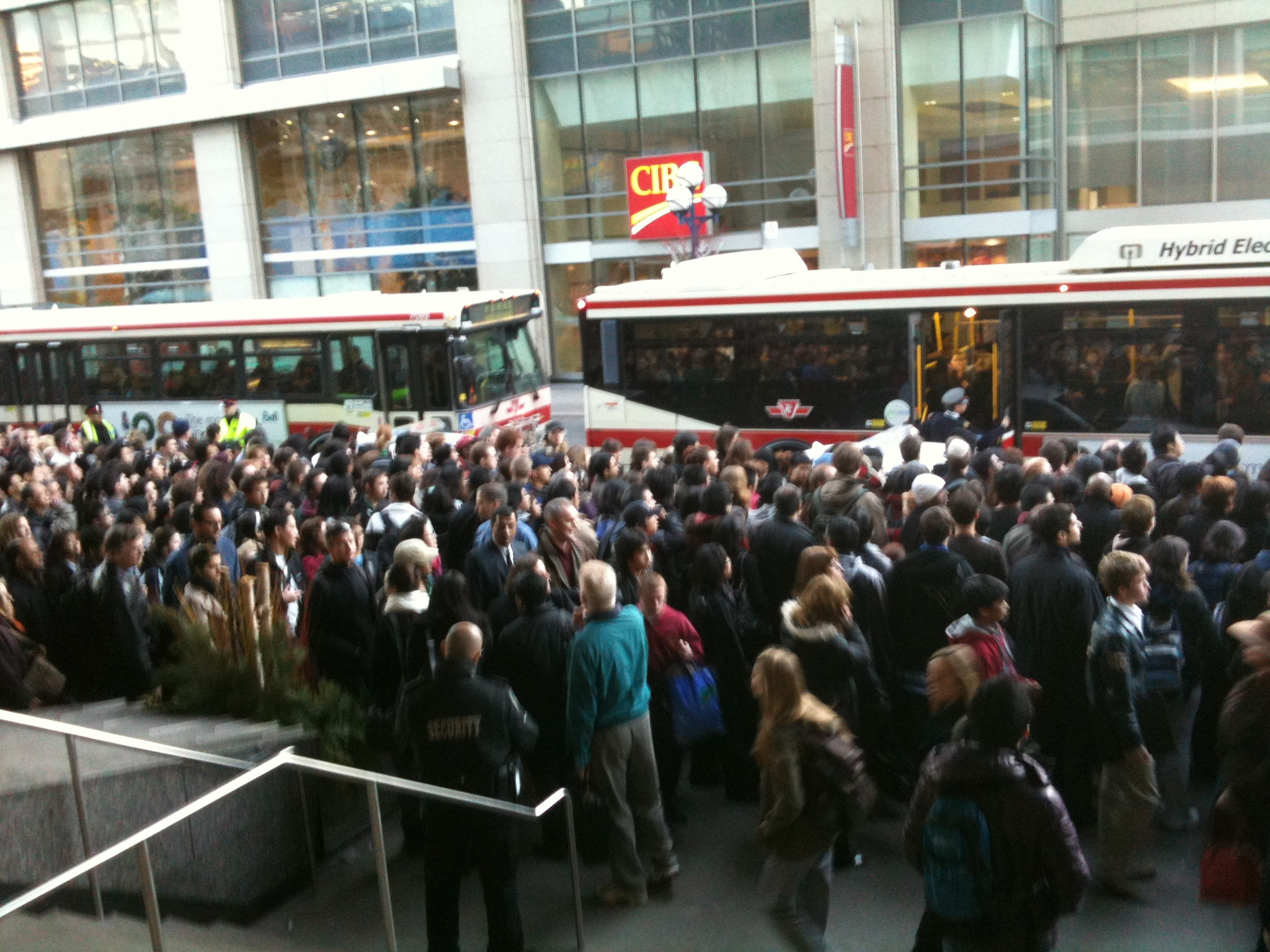
Shuttle buses are often deployed to replace service during an emergency subway closure that is expected to last more than 15 minutes.

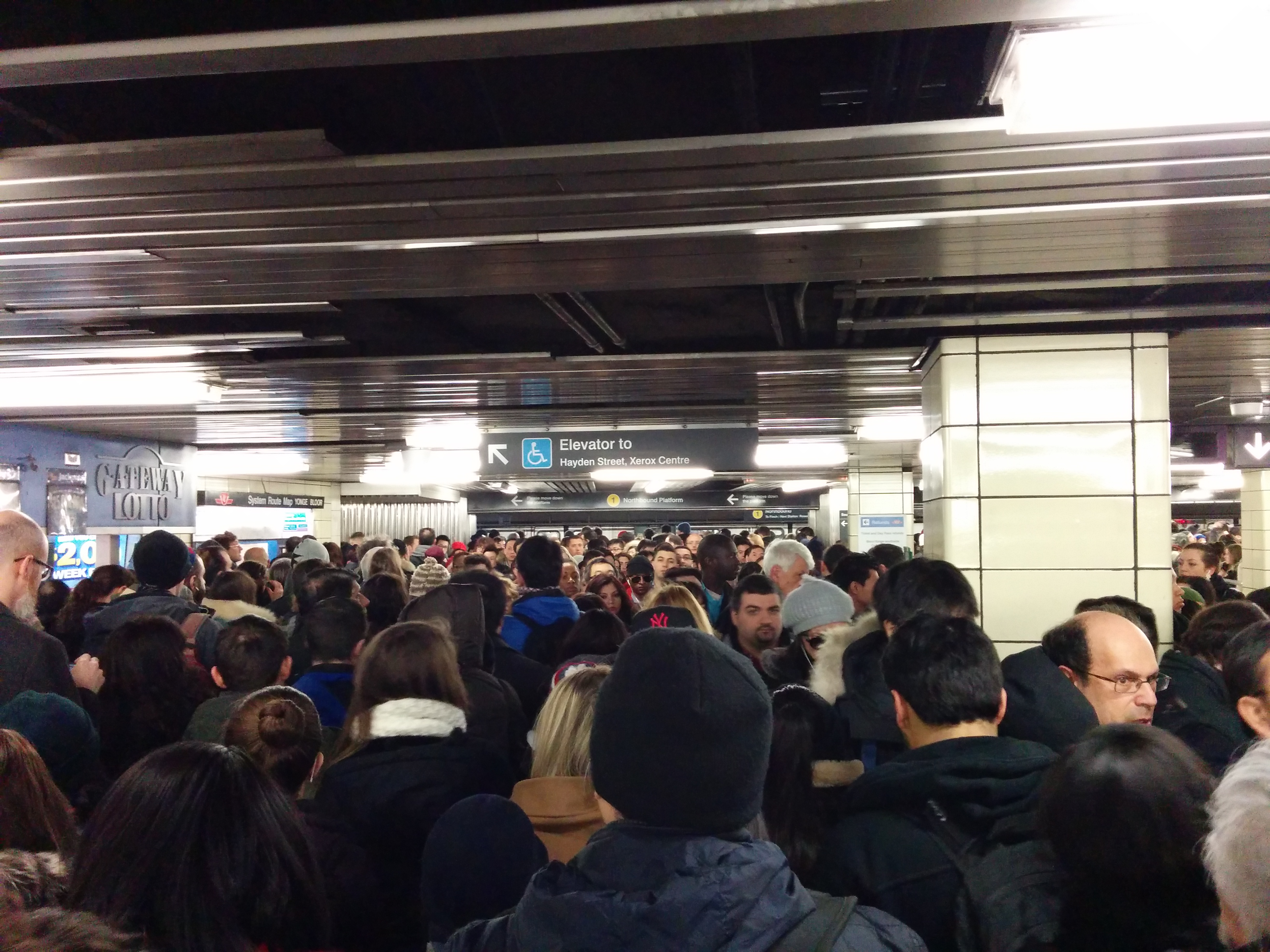
Bloor–Yonge station during a service disruption on Line 1 Yonge–University in 2015

This article lists major incidents of the Toronto Transit Commission (TTC) since 1954, such as accidents and other notable unplanned events.

== Accidents and other incidents ==
=== 1900s ===
- On March 27, 1963, a six-car Gloucester-series subway train was completely destroyed by fire. This occurred on a spare track near Union station, after the few remaining passengers were evacuated.
- In 1974, the TTC union went on strike shutting down the system for 23 days, resulting in traffic jams. Transit service resumed on September 4 after 78 percent of workers voted to return to work given a provincial threat to force an end to the strike. An arbitrator granted union members increased wages, more vacation days and an exact-fare policy for service routes that was to start no later than October 1, 1975.
- On November 7, 1975, 16-year-old schoolgirl Mariam Debra Peters was attacked in St. Patrick station and died a few days later. After a police audit in 1982, this incident led to sections of the respective platforms of St. Patrick and Queen's Park stations being sealed off from the public, along with the installation of "prison" bars at the south end of Museum station to allow for ventilation and storage. In August 2022, construction began to replace this section of Museum station with a second exit, which opened in May 2024 to the public with the automatic fare gates at platform level.
- 1975 Scarborough bus-train collision: On December 12, 1975, a TTC bus travelling east on St. Clair Avenue collided with a westbound GO Transit train at the level crossing between Danforth Road and Midland Avenue just north of the Scarborough GO Train Station. Nine people were killed and 20 others injured. This was the worst accident in terms of loss of life in the history of both the TTC and GO Transit systems. The level crossing was replaced by an overpass a few years later. This also led to the Ontario-wide law that all public transit buses and school buses must come to a stop at level rail crossings prior to proceeding.
- On October 15, 1976, arson destroyed a train and caused significant damage to Christie station. Evidence remains today with the odd-coloured trim tiles on the top of the station walls at the centre of the platforms. A section of the line was closed for two days.
- On June 1, 1982, electrician Reynold Achong was killed by a train while working on the tracks at Summerhill station.
- On August 11, 1995, the Russell Hill subway accident resulted in the deaths of three passengers and injuries to 30 others. There were an additional 100 passengers who filed injury-related claims from the accident.
- In late 1995, TTC employee Jimmy Trajceski was killed during a robbery at Victoria Park station. Adrian Kinkead was arrested four months later for the crime and was found to be responsible for two other murders. He was convicted on all three counts and sentenced to life imprisonment.
- On September 27, 1997, 23-year-old Charlene Minkowski was killed when she was pushed in front of a southbound train at Dundas station. Herbert Cheong, a diagnosed schizophrenic, was convicted of second-degree murder and sentenced to life in prison with no possibility of parole for 15 years.
- In January 1999, an exceptionally large snowstorm paralyzed parts of central Ontario and the American Midwest. Over a two-week period, 118 cm (46 in) of snow fell, with 38 cm (15 in) falling in a single day. As a result, the city and the transit system were severely impacted. In the following days, major interruptions and delays were incurred and TTC policies to handle snow were changed.

=== 2000s ===
==== 2000–2009 ====
- On December 8, 2000, a garbage train caught fire while en route through Old Mill station. The train was completely destroyed and the station remained closed for two days. Since the incident, the TTC has stopped the practice of using garbage trains and maintains a fleet of surface garbage trucks to collect refuse.
- On August 14, 2003, the Northeast Blackout severely impacted TTC services. Without power, subway service was suspended and 18 trains were stuck in tunnels; however, all other trains were able to coast to the nearest station to be evacuated. Streetcars remained stationary where they were, and buses fought to get through gridlocked traffic, hampered by the lack of traffic signals. The subway did not reopen until August 18, the longest complete interruption in subway service in the history of the TTC. The incident led to an extensive review of TTC emergency procedures.
- On February 6, 2006, Mary Kim was born on a subway train at Wellesley station, the first such birth in the Toronto subway system. TTC officials later promised Mary Kim lifetime access to the TTC's service.
- In February 2006, four people were arrested for counterfeiting TTC tokens and smuggling them into Canada. The TTC lost an estimated $10 million dollars in revenue. The suspected manufacturer in Massachusetts claimed to be unaware they were involved in a counterfeiting scheme. The fake tokens used the same aluminum alloy as genuine TTC tokens produced by the Royal Canadian Mint. In late 2006, the TTC introduced a new bi-metal token design to thwart counterfeiting, which was in use until tokens were completely discontinued in the 2020s in favour of Presto.
- On April 23, 2007, a TTC asbestos removal crew employee, Tony Almeida, was killed and several others were injured at the end of a night shift when the work car they were operating snagged on some cabling and dislodged a work platform. The TTC was fined $250,000 ($368,161 in 2025 dollars) for violating the provincial Occupational Health and Safety Act. It was later found that Almeida was under the influence of cannabis.

==== 2010–2019 ====
- On August 30, 2011, a woman was killed when a TTC bus rear-ended a flatbed truck carrying a crane on Lawrence Avenue between Victoria Park Avenue and Don Mills Road. At least 13 other people were injured in the crash. The bus driver was charged in the incident.
- On July 22, 2012, two people were injured when a bus crashed into a building on Queen Street West at Peter Street. The bus hit a car and then a taxicab before slamming into the building.
- On August 10, 2012, a man was chased through Lawrence East station and gunned down against a fence. He survived with critical injuries and was identified as one of the emerging leaders of the Galloway Boys street gang.
- On September 14, 2012, before the start of service TTC employee, Peter Pavlovski was killed and another TTC employee was seriously injured after being struck by a subway maintenance train north of Yorkdale station. The investigation prevented many trains from departing the Wilson Subway Yard, affecting morning rush service.
- On July 27, 2013, 18-year-old Sammy Yatim was shot dead by police aboard the 505 Dundas streetcar. The police officer who shot Yatim dead was later charged with second-degree murder and attempted murder and was found guilty of the latter.
- On August 13, 2013, a cube truck crashed head-on into an idle TTC bus near Middlefield Road and Steeles Avenue East. The accident killed one person and injured 12 people.
- Between December 21 and 22, 2013, a violent ice storm impacted TTC service. On December 22, all streetcar service was suspended for most of the day due to thick ice on the overhead wires. Between December 22 and 23, all of Line 3 Scarborough was shut down, and power issues led to Line 4 Sheppard being closed between December 22 and 24. A number of disruptions were also reported on Line 1 Yonge–University and Line 2 Bloor–Danforth, with some stations being closed for several hours due to power outages.
- On January 29, 2015, a brawl occurred at the concourse level of Union station just after a Toronto Maple Leafs game. Two intoxicated men were resisting arrest and fighting with transit special constables. During the arrest, two TTC Transit Enforcement Unit officers punched one man in the face several times and another man in the ribs during the arrest. Toronto Police arrived and charged the two men. A cell phone video was later posted on Facebook, causing public scrutiny and backlash against the TTC. An independent review of the incident later deemed the arrest and subsequent use of force to be lawful. Two years later, the victims filed a $4 million lawsuit against the TTC and the two enforcement officers.
- On June 8, 2015, between 6:30 a.m. and 8:00 a.m., the entire subway network was shut down due to "major communication issues" between TTC subway trains and the TTC's transit control centre. Hundreds of thousands of commuters were stranded during the shutdown since no shuttle buses were provided to replace subway service. TTC officials believed the incident was caused by a defective switch that drained the battery for the backup power supply.
- On June 18, 2018, a man believed to be in his mid-50s to early 60s was pushed onto the eastbound Line 2 Bloor–Danforth tracks at Bloor–Yonge station and died when struck by an incoming subway train. A first-degree murder charge was laid against the man accused of the attack.

==== 2020–present ====
- On June 12, 2020, there was a near-collision between two subway trains on Line 1 Yonge–University. Before the incident, train 123 was standing on the pocket track on the south side of Osgoode station while train 114 was holding northbound at St. Andrew station with a medical emergency on board. Both trains started to head north towards the switch connecting the pocket track to the northbound main track at Osgoode station. The guard at the rear of train 123 spotted train 114 moving and alerted the operator who stopped train 123 within 1 metre (3 ft 3 in) of train 114. Train 123 with two crew aboard was running at 7 km/h (4.3 mph), while train 114 with 5 passengers and 2 crew was running at 43 km/h (27 mph). The mainline was under automatic train control (ATC) but Transit Control had instructed the crew of train 123 to use manual control on the pocket track. Train 123 was facing a red light on the pocket track, but it was not parked far enough in for its operator to properly see it. The TTC gave unpaid suspensions to the operators of train 123. The TTC union blamed a flaw in ATC that prevented its use on the pocket track. After the incident, the TTC disallowed manual mode on the pocket track.
- On October 29, 2021, the TTC became the target of a ransomware attack, which shut down Vision, the TTC's communications systems. After the attack, the TTC used its backup radio system to communicate with vehicle operators. Also affected were the TTC website (which had debuted its redesign to the public a few days prior), TTC internal email, Wheel-Trans online bookings and displays of next bus information. TTC staff detected unusual network activity on the evening of October 28, 2021, but the full effect of the attack peaked on the afternoon of October 29, 2021. By November 11, 2021, the TTC disclosed that the hackers may have had the ability to access personal employee information, such as social insurance numbers. As a result, the TTC offered three years of free credit monitoring and identity theft protection to its current and former employees. By this time, the TTC had restored its most important computer systems; however, its email system continued to remain offline.
- In December 2021, a vandal damaged elevators at 11 subway stations. Temporary repairs were completed within 24 hours, and TTC special constables apprehended a suspect, who was charged with ten counts of mischief.
- On January 17, 2022, a heavy snowfall of 55 centimetres (22 in) crippled public transit in Toronto, including the TTC's subway, streetcar and bus systems. The TTC reported that 540 of its 1,300 vehicles in service were disabled on the street, including buses, which normally do not use snow tires. Open sections of the subway system were not operational due to mechanical issues caused by heavy snow, with some sections closed until the end of service that day.
- On July 24, 2023, the last car of a train on Line 3 Scarborough derailed south of Ellesmere station. There were 45 people on board, with five injuries and no fatalities reported. The TTC closed the line while the cause of the accident was investigated. It announced on August 24 that the line would not reopen ahead of the planned closure in November of that year as part of the replacement of Line 3 Scarborough with an extension of Line 2 Bloor–Danforth. In late September 2023, the TTC explained that bolts that hold the linear induction rail to the roadbed came loose, causing the magnetically attracted induction rail to strike and derail the last car of the train.

== COVID-19 pandemic ==
=== Ridership decline and impact ===
By late March 2020, TTC ridership had dropped by 70 to 72 percent due to measures to combat the COVID-19 pandemic. Ridership had dropped 80 percent on the subway, 76 percent on streetcars, 62 percent on buses and 75 percent on Wheel-Trans. The TTC estimated its weekly fare revenue dropped from $25 million to $7 million. By late March, the TTC was operating 80 percent of its normal service with reduced ridership and lower staffing levels.

Because of the reduced ridership, the TTC cut a number of services starting March 23, 2020. All downtown express bus routes (141–145) and all but three of the 900-series express bus routes were suspended. Streetcar route 508 Lake Shore was suspended and route 503 Kingston Rd was shortened to run only along its namesake street.

By late April 2020, TTC ridership had fallen to 85 percent of pre-pandemic levels, and the TTC was losing $90 million per month. On April 23, 2020, the TTC announced it would temporarily lay off 1000 operators (after the 30 days' notice required by their union contract) plus 200 non-unionized staff. The TTC still intended to operate between 70 and 80 percent of its pre-pandemic service.

In early May 2020, the TTC announced a further 15 percent reduction in service starting May 10. Rush-hour services on Line 1 Yonge–University and Line 2 Bloor–Danforth would be reduced to match midday and early evening frequency. Service would be cut on 120 bus and streetcar routes. All seasonal bus route extensions (such as to Toronto Zoo, Cherry Beach, Bluffer's Park, Ontario Place, Harbourfront and Woodbine Beach) would be deferred. The remainder of the 503 Kingston Rd route was replaced full-time by the 22A Coxwell bus. These service reductions were expected to last at least until the end of August 2020.

On May 24, 2020, due to reduced ridership and fare revenue, the TTC temporarily laid off 450 employees as a cost-saving measure.

In December 2020, the TTC decided to take advantage of low ridership due to the pandemic and temporarily closed a portion of Line 1 Yonge–University for nine full days to conduct maintenance. The TTC closed Line 1 between Sheppard–Yonge and Finch stations between December 4 (11 pm) and 13, replacing train service with shuttle buses. Maintenance included installing automatic train control, removing asbestos, repairing tunnel linings, performing track remediation and station cleaning. The closure avoided over two years of early nightly closures and provided cost savings.

By February 2021, TTC operators had noticed that homeless people were taking refuge on TTC vehicles because other options were not available during the pandemic. Public libraries and indoor seating at coffee shops were unavailable, and homeless shelters were 99.9 percent full. Since April 2020, two teams – each consisting of a TTC constable and an outreach worker – have attempted to help the homeless sheltering on TTC vehicles but with limited success due to the size of the TTC network. The TTC union urged the city to find alternative accommodation for the homeless.

In 2021, as in December 2020, the TTC again decided to take advantage of low ridership to shut down other portions of Line 1 Yonge–University for multiple 10-day periods for maintenance. For three 10-day periods starting March 15, April 12 and May 17, the TTC closed Line 1 between St. George and St. Andrew stations for tunnel lining repairs, asbestos removal, station cleaning, electrical work and track upgrades. In another 10-day period starting April 26, the TTC closed Line 1 between Wilson and Sheppard West stations for switch installation and track work.

=== Protective changes ===
Seat restricted sign used in the Toronto Transit Commission's vehicles during the COVID-19 pandemic to maintain physical distancing

To maintain physical distancing from bus operators, boarding and fare payment procedures were changed on buses by late March. All passengers who did not require the wheelchair ramp had to board by the rear door of the bus. By April 8, 2020, the TTC was installing thick vinyl barriers on buses to separate the front of the bus from the passenger seating area; the barriers were collapsible to allow access for ramp users from the front door. The TTC stopped accepting cash, tokens and older tickets to pay fares on buses and bus operators stopped handing out paper transfers. However, the TTC allowed riders without a Presto card or Presto ticket to board buses, but asked that they pay the fare later if transferring to a streetcar or the subway. The TTC suspended fare inspections. The TTC permitted operators to wear masks on the job.

Despite the drop in ridership, there was still crowding on several bus routes, preventing physical distancing of the recommended 2 metres (6 ft 7 in) among riders. Crowding occurred when workers from manufacturing areas were boarding at a shift change. To address crowding, the TTC deployed extra buses on affected routes by April 1, 2020, and recommended that riders try to travel after 8 a.m. to avoid the morning rush hour. Crowding was not observed to be a problem on subways and streetcars.

Washroom breaks became a problem for some bus and streetcar operators. While most surface routes connect with a subway station equipped with washrooms, some routes may take up to two hours to return to a subway station. Thus, operators, who had informal agreements with private businesses to use their washrooms, found those facilities closed during the pandemic. The lack of washroom facilities became a health and safety issue as operators could be hurried and distracted from bodily functions. To remedy the problem, the TTC placed portable washrooms for employee use along some of the longer routes.

In January 2020, the TTC began performing extra cleaning and disinfection of vehicles and stations with a focus on touch-and-grab points. By mid-April 2020, the TTC was installing foot-operated hand sanitizer dispensers at subway stations, aiming to complete installation at main entrances by April and secondary entrances by May. Dispensers are located just inside the paid area, and staff monitor them for customer usability. In late April, the TTC blocked off seats on buses, streetcars and subway trains to promote physical distancing among passengers; the TTC used caution tape initially to block seats until more formal seat coverings and signage became available. Starting May 4, bus operators were allowed to designate their bus as "drop off only" and display those words on the LED sign on the front of the bus. "Drop off only" meant that no additional passengers would be allowed to board and the bus only alights passengers. This change was to maintain physical distancing and prevent overloading the bus.

The TTC closed its Customer Service Centre above Davisville station on March 17, 2020, and its Lost Articles Office in Bay station's mezzanine and Photo ID Facility in Bathurst station's mezzanine effective March 19, 2020. In late March, the TTC allowed Presto card holders on the 12-month pass plan to cancel the plan without penalty. The cancellation was effective from April onwards and lasted until cardholders set up a new auto-renew subscription.

The TTC has assigned Wheel-Trans vehicles for the transfer of Toronto Community Housing residents with COVID-19 symptoms to healthcare facilities. The TTC operators for such trips are equipped with personal protective equipment, and the vehicles are given an intense cleaning after use. All Wheel-Trans vehicles are restricted to carrying only one passenger at a time during the pandemic.

In late April 2020, the TTC, working with Toronto Paramedic Services, converted five decommissioned TTC buses into ambulances to transport COVID-19 patients. Each bus can carry three stretcher patients, 8–10 ambulatory patients, 3 paramedics to attend to patients, and a TTC driver. These buses may be used to transfer patients between health facilities, to handle large incidents, and to provide shelter for facility evacuations. They have also been used to shuttle homeless people from shelters and campsites to medical and cooling facilities.

Initially, the TTC supplied masks only to Wheel-Trans operators and maintenance workers dealing with hazardous substances. By mid-April 2020, the TTC changed its policy after pressure from its union, Amalgamated Transit Union Local 113. Subsequently, each bus operator received two masks along with gloves, hand sanitizer, and disinfectant wipes. The TTC later provided the same equipment to streetcar operators.

On May 19, 2020, the TTC strongly recommended that all passengers wear a mask and keep two metres (6 ft 7 in) away from employees and other passengers. Effective July 2, 2020, passengers were required, with few exceptions, to wear masks when riding on the TTC. Despite a potential fine of $195, the TTC stated that it would not be enforcing this requirement. Instead, the TTC decided to use 100 "COVID-19 ambassadors" to encourage passengers to wear a mask. The goal was to have 90 percent of passengers wearing masks, and by July 10, 2020, the TTC observed that 89 percent of all riders were wearing masks despite the lack of enforcement. Prior to the mask policy, only half of riders were wearing masks. By August, 95 percent of riders were wearing masks according to the TTC CEO's Report for that month. By September, compliance was at 97 percent.

By August 2020, the TTC had purchased 600 foot-activated hand sanitizer dispensers from Canadian Mill Nettclean Supply Inc. and distributed them throughout the system.

Effective September 17, 2020, and lasting until at least December 31 of the same year, the TTC ordered that all TTC employees that could come into contact with other individuals wear masks. Previously, masks were optional for TTC employees. Exceptions include subway and streetcar operators who work alone in closed cabs. The TTC had observed in August 2020 that employees were gathering in groups on TTC property without masks and physical distancing.

By mid-November 2020, the TTC was having 11 vending machines installed at 10 subway stations where customers could purchase personal protective equipment (PPE) such as masks, gloves, sanitizer and wipes. This was addition to TTC staff handing out free single-use masks at some subway stations.

=== Reinstatement of services ===
On May 19, 2020, the Lost Articles Office reopened, with only one person at a time being allowed in its vestibule. The office had been closed since March 20, 2020, because of the city lockdown to prevent the spread of COVID-19. Similarly, the TTC reopened its Customer Service Centre on May 25, 2020, allowing only two customers at a time in the office. On June 22, the TTC restored full service on route 503 Kingston Rd that had been partly suspended on March 24 due to reduced ridership.

By late June 2020, although subway and streetcar ridership remained at 18 percent of pre-pandemic levels, bus ridership had reached 37 percent, compared to 14 percent in late April. By this time physical distancing was becoming difficult with 18 percent of bus trips exceeding the maximum of 15 passengers per bus.

In June 2020, the TTC resumed fare inspections but only to advise and encourage passengers to pay their fares. On July 2, 2020, all-door boarding was implemented on buses. Passengers could pay cash, tokens and senior and youth tickets and obtain a transfer at the front door of a bus; this reversed a change made in early April.

On August 12, 2020, the Province of Ontario promised $404 million for TTC operations to compensate for reduced ridership and revenue loss during the pandemic, with more funding to come later. The TTC projected a shortfall of $700 million in 2020. At the time, ridership was at 35 percent of pre-pandemic levels; it was increasing more on buses than on other modes. When ridership increases to 50 percent, the TTC would start restoring more services, which had been operating at 85 percent of pre-pandemic levels. As a condition of funding, the provincial government required transit agencies, including the TTC, to consider using privately operated microtransit such as Uber's ride-sharing services to replace low-volume bus routes. Innisfil in Simcoe County north of Toronto conducted a pilot of such an approach, which was popular with participants but was criticized for costing more than a public transit bus service and contributing to congestion.

On August 27, 2020, the TTC announced a recall of 150 of the 450 TTC employees who were laid off in late May. This was to handle school reopenings in September. By late August, ridership had increased from its lowest point of 15–20 percent to 35–40 percent of pre-pandemic ridership. On September 17, the TTC announced the recall of an additional 132 laid-off union employees to return to work starting October 4. The TTC planned to recall the remaining 168 laid-off employees when ridership reached 50 percent of pre-pandemic levels.

On October 15, 2020, the TTC announced the recall of the last 180 laid-off front-line workers, including 97 operators. The recall allowed the TTC to restore full service to the system. At that time, ridership had risen to 36 percent of pre-pandemic levels; by mode, bus ridership was at about 50 percent of pre-pandemic levels versus 32 and 36 percent for subway and streetcar usage respectively. The TTC was responding to complaints of overcrowding (given the requirements for physical distancing) on buses even though the bus system was already at 95 percent capacity. The recall also allowed the TTC to staff shuttle buses during a scheduled ten-day shutdown of Line 1 Yonge–University in December 2020 between Finch and Sheppard–Yonge stations for asbestos removal. The TTC planned to recruit new drivers to replace those retiring.

As part of a project dubbed RapidTO, the TTC opened priority bus lanes on Eglinton Avenue East on October 11, 2020. The COVID-19 pandemic provided the impetus for the RapidTO project. The lanes were created to improve TTC service in lower-income neighbourhoods, which housed employees performing essential services during the pandemic. By allowing buses to move faster, there would be less crowding and better physical distancing. Two express bus routes (905 Eglinton East Express and 986 Scarborough Express) that were suspended in mid-March 2020 were restored to operate along the new bus lanes. Effective November 23, 2020, eight additional 900-series express bus routes were restored elsewhere in the city for weekday service.

For the week ending October 1, 2021, the TTC was operating 98 percent of its service, carrying 43 percent of its pre-pandemic ridership. By November 2021, the TTC began to enforce a vaccine mandate affecting its employees. Any employee not reporting their vaccine status by November 20, 2021, would be placed on unpaid leave. Any employee not vaccinated by December 31, 2021, would be terminated. As of November 16, 2021, 90 percent of TTC employees had disclosed their vaccine status, of which 85 percent were fully vaccinated. The TTC expected this would result in a labour shortage. Thus, for the service period beginning November 21, 2021, the TTC planned to temporarily reduce service on Line 2 Bloor–Danforth, 57 bus routes and one streetcar line (512 St. Clair). The TTC estimated a 10 percent reduction in service starting November 21, 2021. By early December 2021, 800 TTC employees had been suspended without pay for failing to comply with the vaccine mandate. On December 31, 2021, the TTC dismissed 354 employees (over two percent of its workforce) for non-compliance with the vaccine mandate. About 200 other employees were still on unpaid leave pending the receipt of a second vaccine dose by January 31, 2022. The TTC embarked on a recruitment campaign to replace the dismissed employees. On February 13, 2022, the TTC partially restored service to pre-pandemic levels on 17 bus routes.

In August 2022, TTC ridership was between 55 and 60 percent of pre-pandemic volumes. Due to the lifting of pandemic restrictions, the TTC expected a 10 to 15 percent increase in passenger volume as workers returned to offices and students returned to school. Thus, the TTC scheduled increased service starting on September 4, 2022, affecting 29 bus routes, 2 streetcar routes, and Lines 1 and 2. On that date, all but six of the routes suspended in March 2020 were back in service. The five Downtown Express routes 141–145 remained suspended pending a review of their effectiveness as part of the 2023 Annual Service Plan and were later been suspended indefinitely due to low ridership. The 508 Lake Shore streetcar route remained suspended pending completion of a track replacement along its route, though it was later brought back to service.

By October 7, 2022, ridership on the bus system was at 75 percent of pre-pandemic levels, with 54 percent for the streetcar system, 62 percent for the subway system and 62 percent for Wheel-Trans.

In November 2022, the TTC offered to rehire many of the 367 unvaccinated workers it dismissed in late 2021. The TTC lifted its mandatory vaccination policy effective the end of that month. Rehired workers would not get back pay but their seniority would be preserved.

By January 2023, ridership was still 30 percent below pre-pandemic levels. Thus, the city decided that the TTC had to raise fares and cut service to compensate for lower revenue. The TTC decided to implement 39 service changes, of which 28 would be service reductions; 26 of the 28 routes would have a 10 percent increase in wait times. Most service cuts would be in off-peak hours. A study out of Toronto Metropolitan University claimed that most of the service cuts would affect areas where lower-income people resided. The TTC scheduled the service changes to begin on March 26, 2023. However, the fares for the Fair Pass program were not increased as the program serves low-income riders eligible for the Ontario Works program and riders with disabilities, including non-physical disabilities, recognized by the Ontario Disability Support Program (ODSP).

=== COVID-19 incidents ===
On March 19, 2020, the TTC temporarily closed the Duncan garage at the Hillcrest Complex after a mechanic tested positive for COVID-19. The TTC sent 170 co-workers home to self-isolate for two weeks and had the garage disinfected. The mechanic testing positive had worked one shift on March 11 before being sent home after feeling ill. Since the garage was used for major overhauls and rebuilds, its temporary closure had no impact on daily bus operations.

On April 23, 2020, the TTC sent 70 staff at the Queensway garage home to self-isolate for two weeks after five co-workers tested positive for COVID-19. The TTC had the garage thoroughly disinfected. The garage was not closed; some managerial staff were assigned maintenance work, and the TTC intended to reassign some maintenance work to other garages.

By June 2020, there had not been any confirmed cases of COVID-19 being spread by passengers riding on public transit. This observation contradicted predictions at the beginning of the crisis that public transit would be a major venue for the spread of virus. 65 out of 15,000 TTC employees contracted COVID-19, but it is unknown whether they contracted it on or off the job. Toronto Public Health (TPH) did not trace any of the 13,500 COVID-19 cases to public transit. TPH spokesperson Dr. Vinita Dubey warned that this did not mean the virus was being transmitted on public transit as the long 14-day incubation period makes it difficult to determine where and when infection occurred.

== Suicides ==
The TTC has long maintained a policy of not releasing suicide information and statistics to the public or the media for fear of the possibility of "copycat suicides". In 2008, the Toronto Sun launched a year-long appeal before Ontario's Information and Privacy Commissioner to have the TTC release information on the number of suicides and attempts between 1998 and 2007. The Information and Privacy Commissioner ordered the statistics be made available, and they were released to the public on November 26, 2009.

From 1998 to 2007, 150 people died by suicide by coming into contact with a TTC subway train. Since 1954, when the Yonge subway line first opened, there have been more than 1,200 incidents on the TTC (including both fatalities and attempts).

After being forced to make the information public, the TTC ensured that it also released information demonstrating the efforts being taken to intervene and prevent such incidents in the future. The TTC's "Gatekeeper Program" is an internal course available for front line staff to learn and identify the warning signs of someone who may be suicidal, and help them or try to prevent them from doing so on the transit system. The TTC also has partnerships with St. Michael's Hospital and other institutions to assist with both prevention programs and counselling programs for staff who have witnessed such incidents. The TTC maintains that it will continue its policy of not reporting suicides and suicide-related statistics, however in February 2010, statistics from 2008 and 2009 were released in a public report to the Commission regarding suicide and suicide prevention. On November 10, 2014, separate suicide attempts were made, halting service on two lines. Following this, platform screen doors were discussed, but the TTC did not have a plan for funding the $800 million required to upgrade all its subway stations, including those on the Line 1 extension to Vaughan Metropolitan Centre station and on Line 5 Eglinton and Line 6 Finch West. However, the automated Ontario Line, which is under construction as of 2026, is planned to have platform screen doors at all stations upon the line's opening.

Short barriers have been installed at TMU station. However, they have been criticized as being inadequate and mayoral candidate Brad Bradford proposed platform screen doors at all stations during the 2026 Toronto mayoral election.

=== Statistics ===
The below statistics are the subway suicide incidents and attempts from 1998 through 2016:

Year	Suicides	Attempts	Total Incidents
1998	12	13	25
1999	22	4	26
2000	21	12	33
2001	12	17	29
2002	16	11	27
2003	17	9	26
2004	15	8	23
2005	14	6	20
2006	8	11	19
2007	13	9	22
2008	11	8	19
2009	14	4	18
2010	19	10	29
2011	8	8	16
2012	11	8	20
2013	8	9	17
2014	9	17	26
2015	11	5	16

Note: Data obtained from Toronto Transit Commission report that does not distinguish between attempted and completed suicides.

== Track delays ==
In 2018, the TTC reported that trains were delayed for 1572 total minutes and that there were over 110 unauthorized track-level incidents.

== Motorists entering streetcar tunnels ==
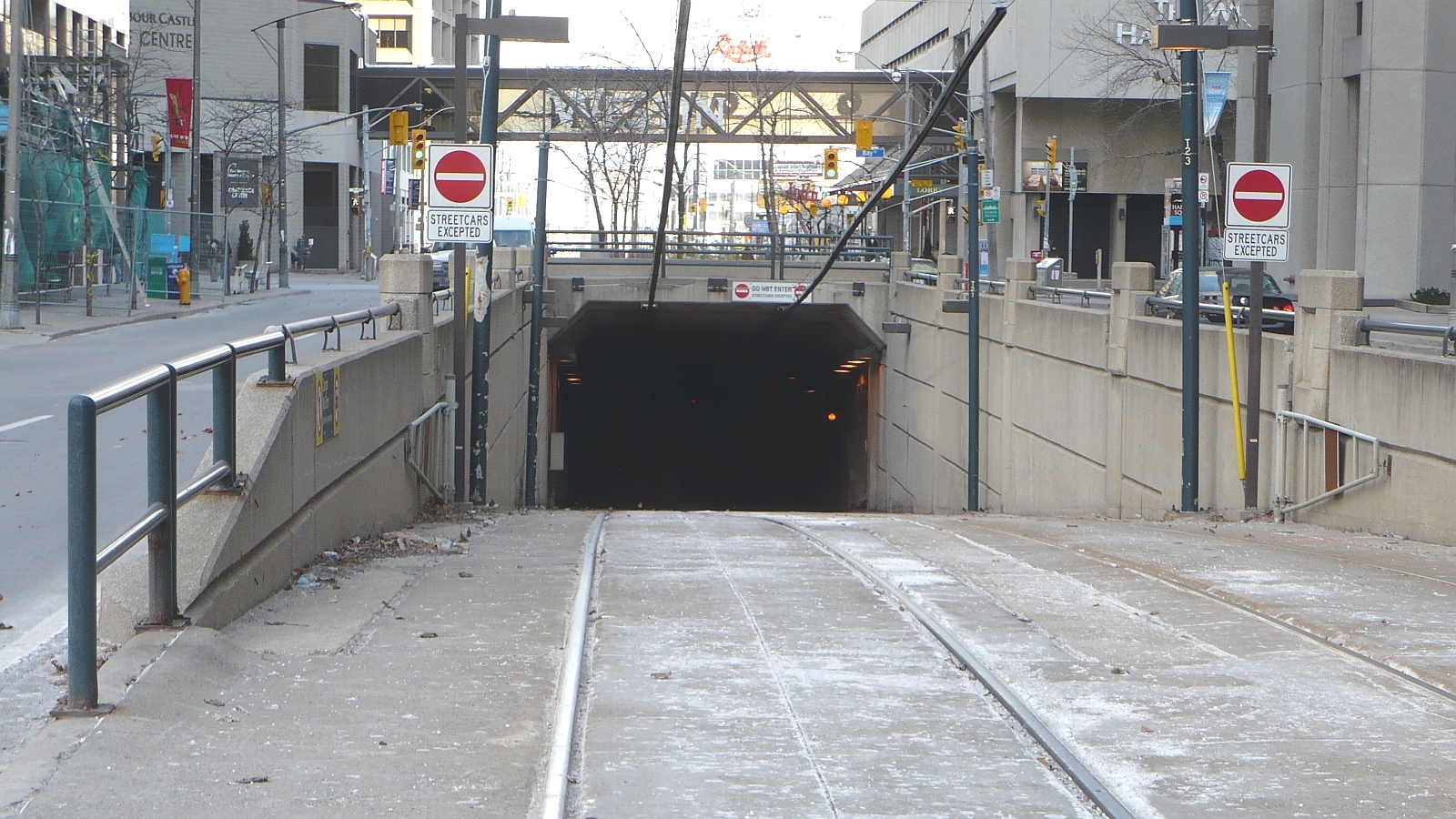
Streetcar portal leading to Queens Quay station in 2009 prior to the installation of bar gates in October 2018

Same streetcar portal with bar gates

There have been over twenty incidents of motorists illegally entering the streetcar portal west of Queens Quay station between 2014 and 2017. This figure increased to 25 from 2014 to March 2018. Because of these incidents, the TTC installed bar gates to deter motorists from entering the portal in October 2018; the gates cost $61,000 to install.
