= A. Y. Jackson Secondary School (Toronto) =

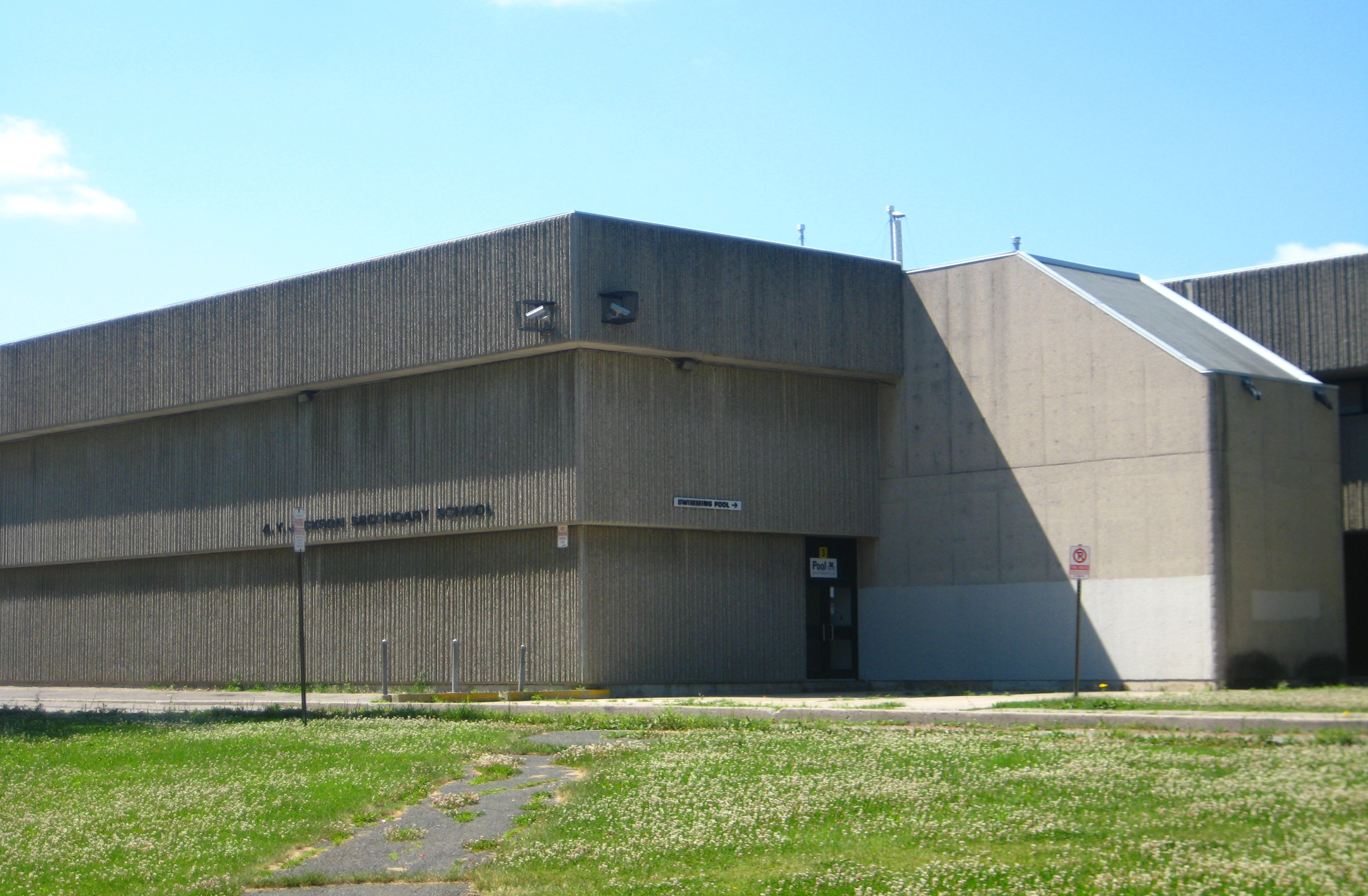

Location
- 50 Francine Drive; Toronto, Ontario, M2H 2G6; Canada; 43.8049°N 79.3662°W

Information
- School type: High school
- Founded: November 26th, 1970
- School board: Toronto District School Board
- Superintendent: Peter Chang
- Area trustee: James Li
- School number: 890227
- Principal: Nick Rowe
- Grades: 9-12
- Enrolment: 1,277 (2026)
- Language: English
- Schedule type: Semestered
- Hours in school day: 6.25
- Area: 15.32 acres
- Student Union/Association: Student Activity Council (S.A.C)
- Colours: Black and orange
- Mascot: Jaguar
- Team name: Jackson Jaguars
- Newspaper: Jackson Times
- Feeder schools: Highland Middle School, Zion Heights Middle School
- Website: schoolweb.tdsb.on.ca/ayjackson/
- Last updated: October 20, 2026

A. Y. Jackson Secondary School is a secondary school for grades 9 to 12 in Toronto, Ontario, Canada. It was opened in 1970 by the North York Board of Education, and is now operated by its successor, the Toronto District School Board. The school was named after A. Y. Jackson, a Canadian painter and one of the founders of the Group of Seven.

== History ==
A. Y. Jackson Secondary School opened in 1970 as a grades 10 to 13 school. The school was designed by architecture firm Allward & Gouinlock Architects in partnership with Raymond Moriyama for the North York Board of Education, however, as part of the 1998 amalgamation of North York into the City of Toronto, the Toronto District School Board now operates A. Y. Jackson.

The school was originally proposed to be named as Eastview Secondary School but changed to be named as A. Y. Jackson Secondary School, after the former painter and member of the Group of Seven. The school was designed by Allward & Gouinlock Architects (defunct), with four engineering firms responsible for different aspects of the school. Maksymec & Associates (succeeded by Planmac Engineering Inc) was responsible for structural engineering, T.J Escedi & Associates (defunct) for precast concrete, Yost, Mews & Associates (defunct) for mechanical engineering, and Cole, Sherman & Associates (defunct) handling electrical engineering. Construction of the school costed $3,700,000, and the official grand opening was held on the night of Thursday November 26, 1970. The school was designed to be open-area, like many other schools designed in the early 70s, prominently across Ontario. The schools architecture is a blend of Mid-century modern and Brutalist architecture of the exterior, reminiscent of which to the former Ontario Science Centre. The school features an “eye-catching reception hall” that was designed to look like a hotel lobby; replacing traditional hardwood flooring as well to feature carpeted flooring across many of its hallways and classrooms. (Mostly replaced with tiling in recent years). The school formerly featured a lounging area at the top of the spiral staircase which has now been replaced by SHSM and guidance office space. The school was once dubbed as "Metro's most modern secondary school" at the time of its opening.

The “open-area” spaces within the school was closed off due to controversy and flaws with the concept.

In 2016, as part of a TDSB board decision, the school underwent more changes, with the school now supporting grade nine students and the Gifted program.

== Student life ==
=== Academics ===
The school offers three Specialist High Skills Majors (SHSM) in the fields of Biotechnology, Business, and Information Communications Technology. It also offers three dual credit courses in Forensic Science, Introduction to Marketing, and Composition & Creativity, and Aeronautics in collaboration with Seneca Polytechnic. The school also serves as the giftedness program secondary school for much of east North York, as well as parts of Scarborough. In the 2018–2019 school year, 90% of grade 9 students achieved the provincial standard in academic math and 50% achieved the provincial standard in applied math. In addition, in the 2018–2019 school year, 87% of grade 10 students achieved the provincial standard for Literacy on their first attempt. More recently, in the 2021-2022 school year, A Y Jackson ranked 1st among all TDSB schools on the EQAO math assessment with 93.2% of students achieving the provincial standard.

=== Sports ===
Currently, A.Y. Jackson has the following sports teams:

- Aquatics
- Badminton
- Basketball
- Cross country
- Curling
- Flag football
- Table tennis
- Soccer
- Ultimate frisbee
- Track and Field
- Volleyball
- Ice hockey
- Slo-Pitch
- Skiing & Snowboarding

=== Clubs ===
In the 2021–2022 school year, A.Y. Jackson has 52 different clubs, councils and ensembles, including 5 related to the arts, and 13 related to the STEM fields.

== Student demographics ==
The student population of A.Y Jackson is diverse, with a large component of students living in Canada for five years or less (about 14%), and around 92% of the population speaking a primary language other than English. As of 2020, 14% of the students are enrolled in the gifted program and 25% of students live in lower-income households. There were 263 females and 290 males in the school in 2020, making A.Y. Jackson's total student body 653 as of June 30, 2021.

== Notable alumni ==
- Henry Lau, singer, musician, actor, and ex-member of Super Junior-M
- Alex Lifeson, guitarist for the rock group Rush
- Sorel Mizzi, professional poker player
- Daniel Negreanu, professional poker player
- Merrill Nisker (better known as Peaches), electronica musician
- Monita Rajpal, CNN International news anchor
- Joshua Liendo, Swimmer known for winning 2nd place in the 100m butterfly in the 2024 Paris Olympics
- Gerald Eaton, producer, frontman of The Philosopher Kings
- Mariam Peters, victim of a fatal attack in St. Patrick station
- Kaseem Ferdinand, football player

== See also ==
- Education in Ontario
- List of secondary schools in Ontario
