= Murder of Mariam Peters =

Canadian girl murdered at St. Patrick station on Line 1 Yonge–University in 1975

Mariam Peters
- Born: Mariam Debra Peters; 1958 or 1959
- Died: November 11, 1975 (aged 16); Toronto, Ontario, Canada
- Cause of death: Murder
- Known for: Unsolved death for 51 years and 11 days

Mariam Debra Peters (1958/1959 – November 11, 1975) was a Canadian girl who was murdered at St. Patrick station on Line 1 Yonge–University in 1975. Her unsolved murder prompted safety reforms by the Toronto Transit Commission (TTC) and led to alterations in the design of the Line 1 stations St. Patrick, Queen's Park and Museum.

== Background ==
Mariam Debra Peters was the eldest of three children of Holocaust survivors Max and Merle Peters.

At the time of her murder, Peters was a grade 11 student at A. Y. Jackson Secondary School, and she was acquainted with the daughters of G. Gordon Hurlburt, who was the Chairman of the Toronto Transit Commission at the time.

== Murder ==
On Friday, November 7, 1975, Peters and her mother, Merle, left their home at Willowdale in North York. Peters was to visit her sick grandfather at Mount Sinai Hospital with her boyfriend that night. However he became sick with a cold and was unable to accompany Mariam. At around 6:30pm, Merle dropped her daughter off at Finch station for her subway commute. After visiting her grandfather at the hospital, Mariam made her way back to St. Patrick station. At approximately 8:20 p.m, she was discovered by two nurses on their way to work at the top of one of the station's escalators, badly suffering from stab wounds. Peters had been stabbed 16 times on the escalator of the deserted subway station by an unknown assailant who immediately fled the murder scene. She was subsequently transported to the Toronto General Hospital. After four days of fighting for her life in critical condition, Peters succumbed to a brain hemorrhage which was caused by her injuries, on November 11.

A person of interest was identified after being linked to the stabbing of another woman who was able to escape the assailant ten minutes later in a parking lot near Simcoe St and Wellington St. However, no arrests were made in either case "due to the lack of direct evidence." The police offered a $10,000 reward for information about the killer, but the case remains unsolved.

== Aftermath ==
A funeral, attended by 1,500 people, including members of the public, was held at the Pride of Israel Temple.

Immediately following the murder, permanent patrols of uniformed police were deployed to the subway line for the first time in TTC history. The Peters family petitioned TTC to install closed-circuit television in deserted areas of the subway stations. However, a joint study from TTC and the Toronto Police Service rejected the proposition due to the high cost of installation and hiring additional employees. Instead, passenger-activated alarm systems were installed in subway cars, and mirrors for better visibility of the car interior by the driver and guard were also tested.

The site of the murder, along with another passageway at Queen's Park station, were sealed off to "eliminate potential hiding places for lawbreakers". These spaces were converted to storage rooms. Following a police audit in 1982, a similar passageway was sealed off at the Museum station. Metal bars were used instead of solid walls to avoid blocking ventilation fans that had been installed, creating a "cage"-like appearance for this area. This section is being replaced with a second exit for Museum station since August 2022.
