= Museum station (Toronto) =

Toronto subway station

Museum
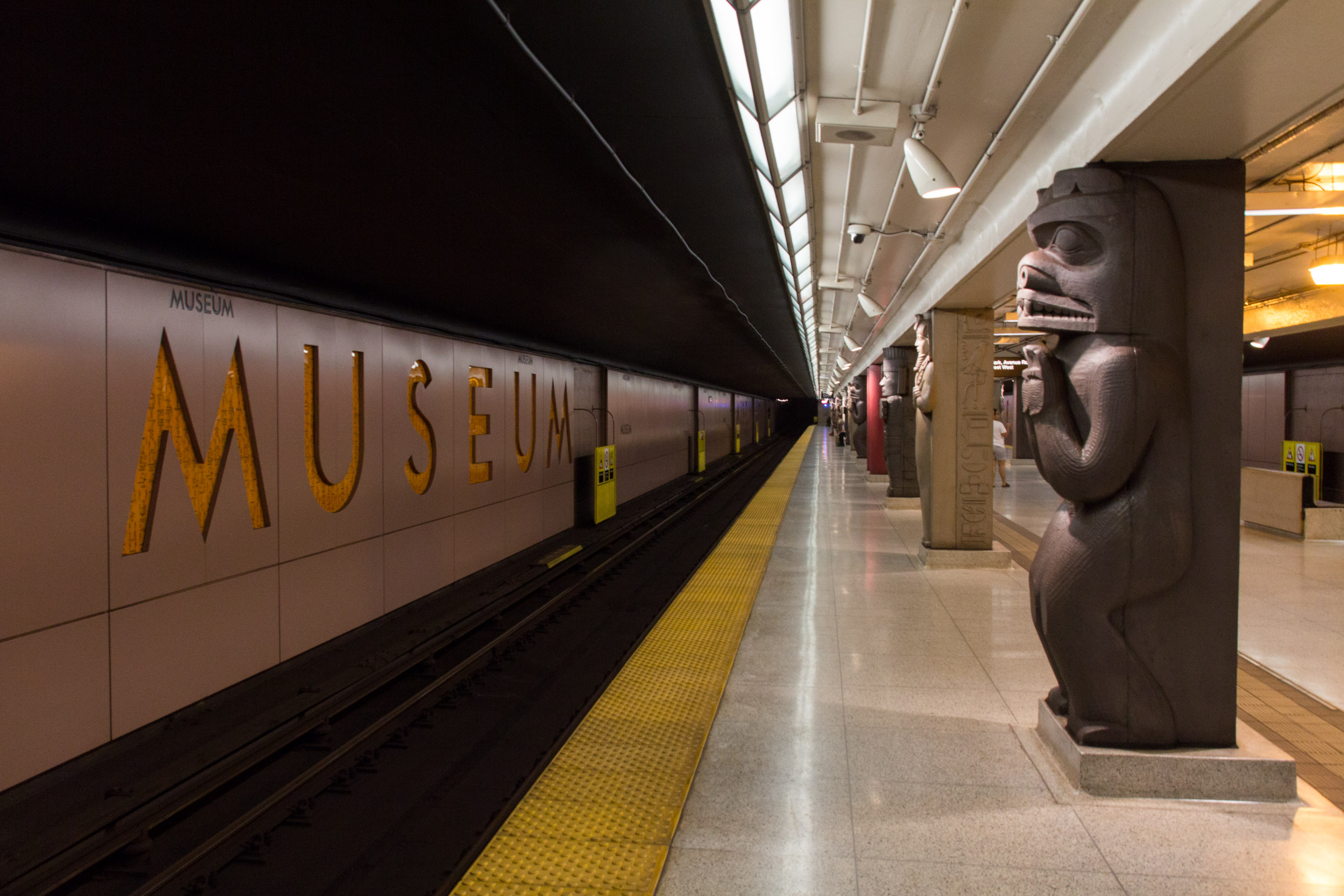

General information
- Location: 75 Queen's Park; Toronto, Ontario; Canada
- Coordinates: 43°40′01″N 79°23′36″W
- Platforms: Centre platform
- Tracks: 2

Construction
- Structure type: Underground
- Accessible: No

Other information
- Website: Official station page

History
- Opened: February 28, 1963; 63 years ago
- Rebuilt: April 2008, 2024

Passengers
- 2023–2024: 9,604
- Rank: 56 of 70

Services
Preceding station	Toronto Transit Commission	Following station
St. George towards Vaughan	Line 1 Yonge–University	Queen's Park towards Finch
Track layout
Location

Museum is a subway station on Line 1 Yonge–University in Toronto, Ontario, Canada. It opened in 1963 and is located on the northeast portion of the University of Toronto St. George campus under Queen's Park at Charles Street West. It is beside the Royal Ontario Museum (ROM) after which it is named.

== Structure ==
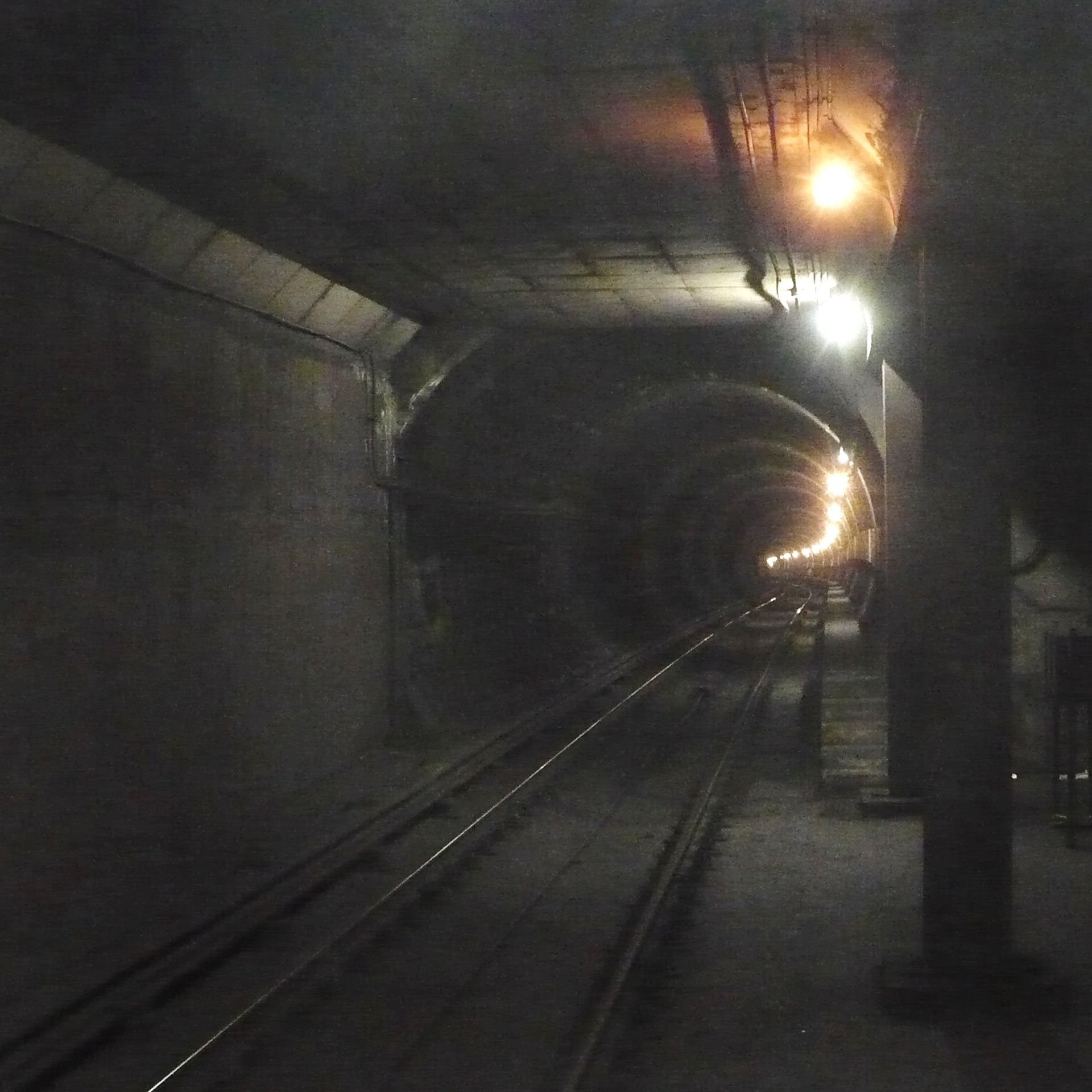
South of the station, the tunnel can be seen curving to the east.

The station structure was created in the middle of the road using cut and cover, while immediately south of the station the line goes into a bored tunnel to run under Queen's Park, passing east of the Ontario Legislative Building to reach Queen's Park station. The concourse is located under the roadway, one level above the north end of a centre platform, with entrances from either side of the road. There are two stairways on the west side adjacent to the southern end of the Royal Ontario Museum and two on the east, just south of Charles Street. Pedestrians are encouraged to use the station as a pedestrian underpass to cross Queen's Park, a wide and busy thoroughfare without a centre median. There is also a stairway from Queen's Park leading directly to the southern end of the subway platform. This station does not yet have an elevator and is not wheelchair accessible.

When the McLaughlin Planetarium was being designed in the mid-1960s, a tunnel connecting the station to the planetarium was considered. This feature was abandoned due to budget constraints.

=== Connection to Line 2 Bloor–Danforth ===
Bay and St. George stations each have four parallel tracks, two above two. Between these stations and Museum is a full double-track, grade-separated wye junction. The tracks to and from Museum connect to the upper St. George and Lower Bay stations, while the tracks along Bloor use lower St. George and upper Bay.

The decision by Metro Council in 1960 to build a wye from the University line to the eastbound Bloor line between Museum and Bay stations was a controversial one. TTC Chairman Clarence Downey opposed the construction, estimated to cost about $10 million, saying that $10 million would build an extra mile of subway on the Bloor–Danforth line. The construction was estimated to cost $3 million for the basic interchange, and $7 million for the “intricate trackage system”.

From February to September 1966, all three sides of the wye were used in regular service: from each of three terminals—Eglinton, Keele, and Woodbine—trains ran alternately to the other two (between Eglinton and Museum via Union). Thereafter, Line 2 Bloor–Danforth became a separate route, Lower Bay was closed, and upper St. George became a terminus for the Yonge–University line until it was extended to Wilson in 1978. The tunnel to Lower Bay is visible from northbound trains shortly after they leave Museum Station.

== Station access upgrades ==
In August 2022, construction started on a second entrance via an exterior staircase at the south end of Museum station; it was opened in May 2024. The staircase is located at the north end of Queens Park Circle on the south side of the War Memorial monument. It leads down to platform-level turnstiles, located at the site of a former storage space. (Note: Following a police audit in 1982 in response to the murder of Mariam Peters at St. Patrick station in 1975, the south end of the station had metal "prison" bars installed to allow for ventilation and storage. The storage area has been replaced by platform-level turnsiles for the Queens Park entrance.) For station accessibility, there will also be an entrance via elevator to a new concourse level providing access to a second elevator to the platform level; these changes were expected to be completed by the fourth quarter of 2026.

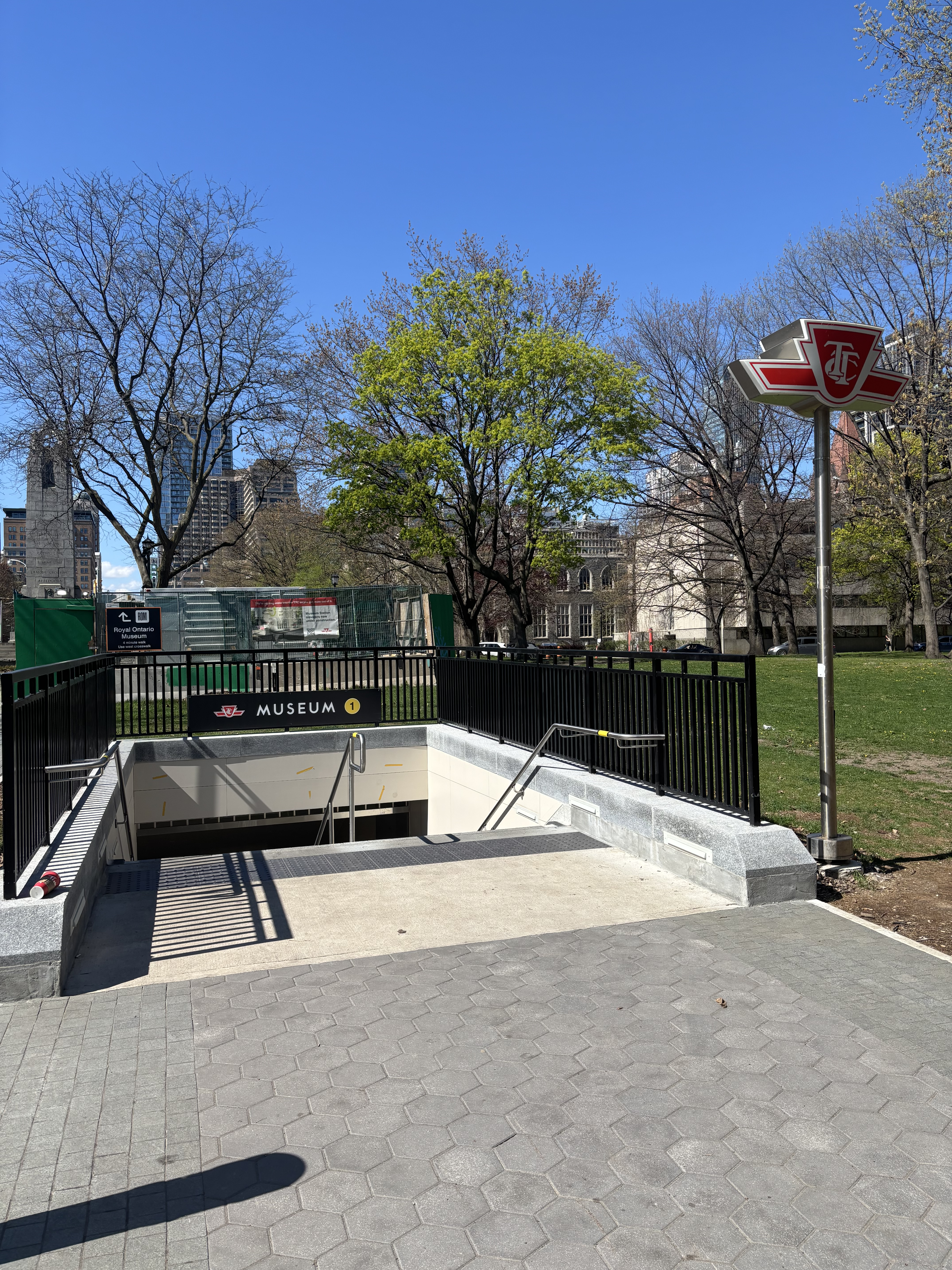
New Museum station south entrance, opened in 2024

== Architecture and art ==
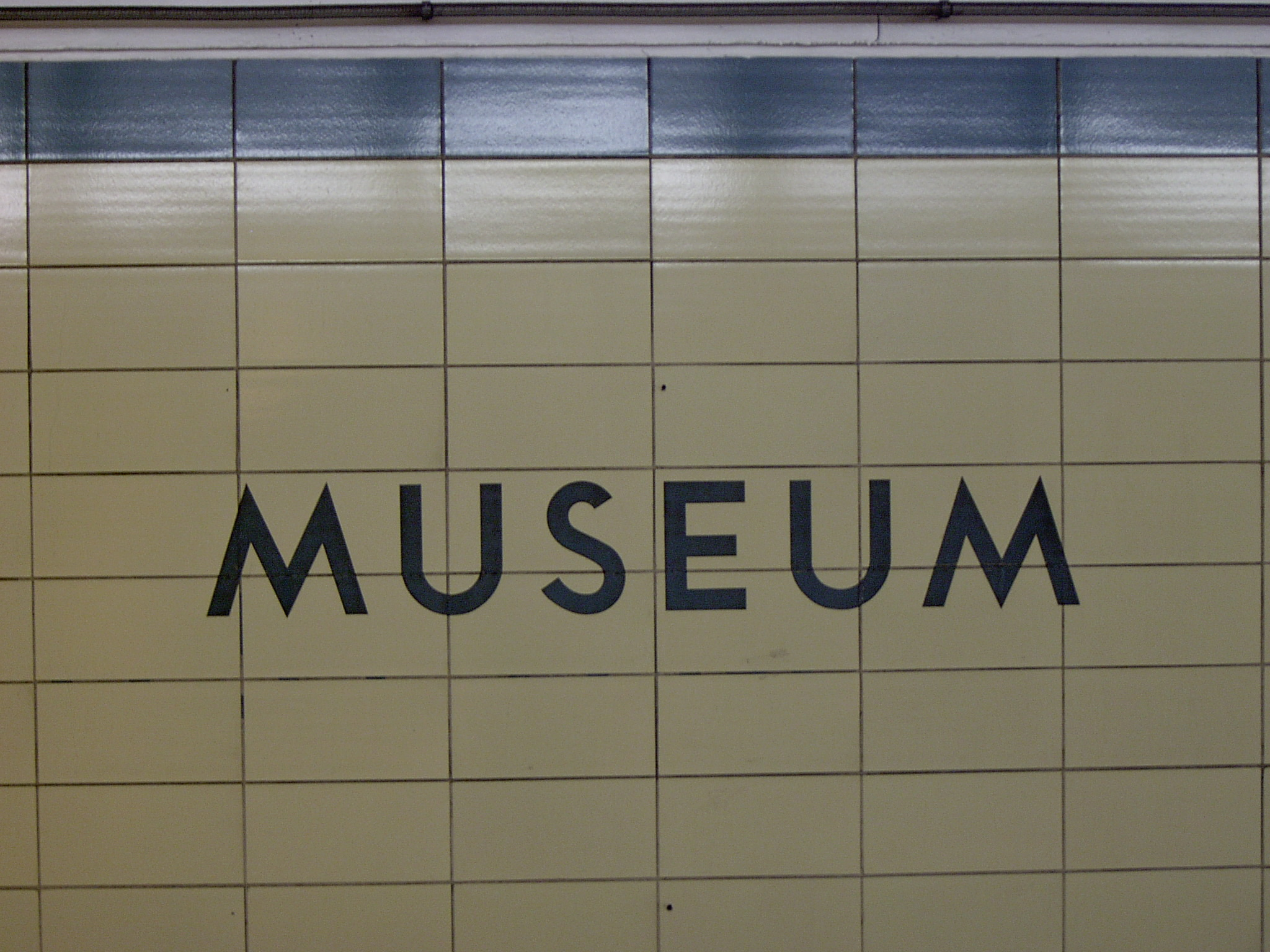
Original cream and blue tiles

The station opened with the same tile scheme which would become standard on Line 2 Bloor–Danforth, whose first phase was completed three years later in 1966. Smooth, unadorned cream-coloured rectangular tiles were predominant, with a strip of narrower blue tiles near the ceiling. The unique Toronto subway typeface was used for the station name, sandblasted into the wall and painted in the same shade of blue as the narrower strip of tiles.

In April 2008, a major renovation by Diamond and Schmitt Architects and Jeviso Construction Corporation transformed the platform level to mirror exhibits in the Royal Ontario Museum. This renovation replaced the original tile scheme. Supporting columns were redesigned to evoke various historical and cultural figures, including the Egyptian deity Osiris, Toltec warriors, Doric columns, Forbidden City columns, and Indigenous Northwest Coast house posts. The walls were reclad with mauve aluminum panels by Ontario Panelization, which incorporated painted 1/4" fire-rated Lexan into the panels composing the large "MUSEUM" lettering on the walls with a historical hieroglyphic inscription from the ROM.

Before, during, and after

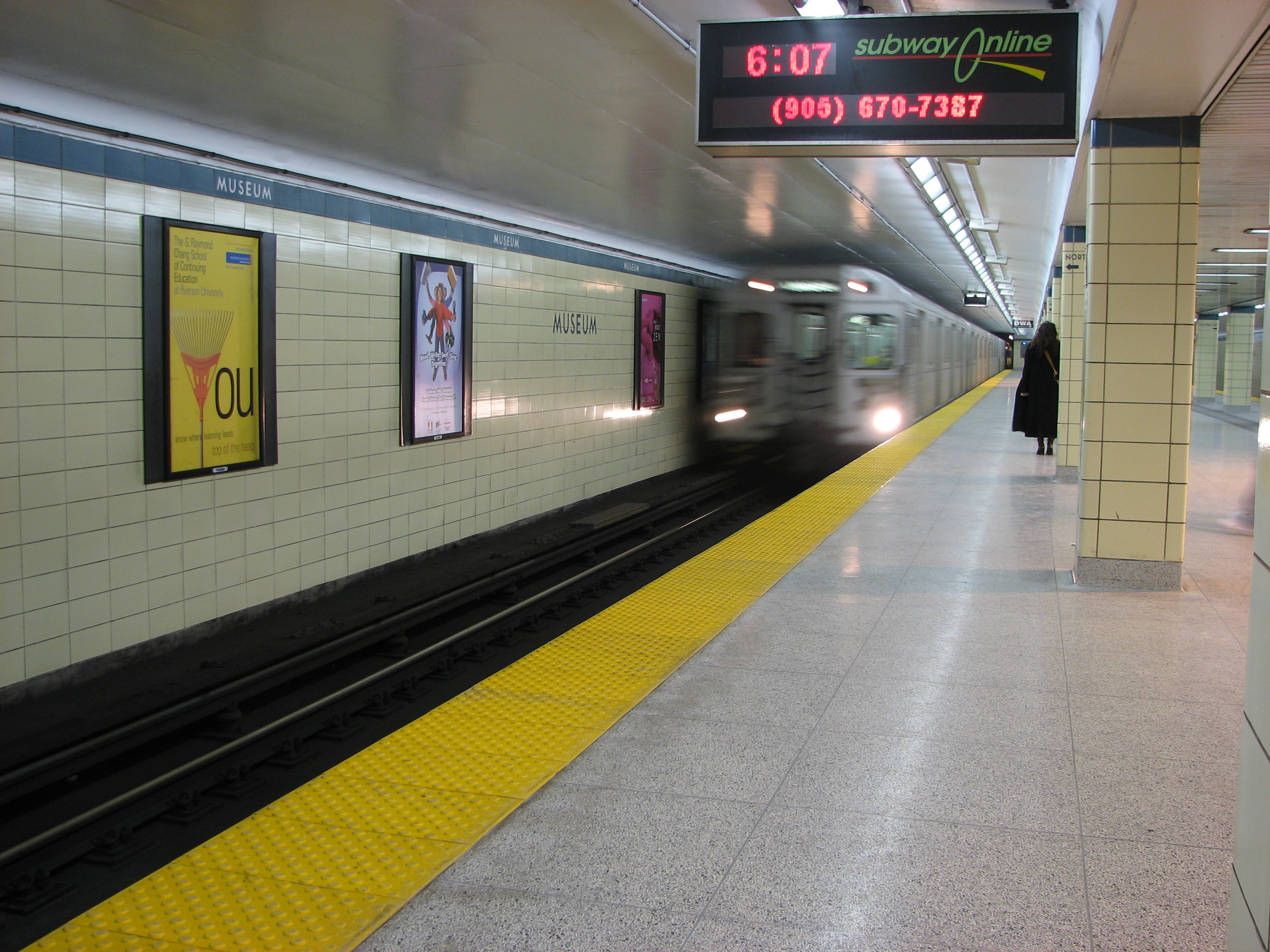
Original platform design with unadorned tiles

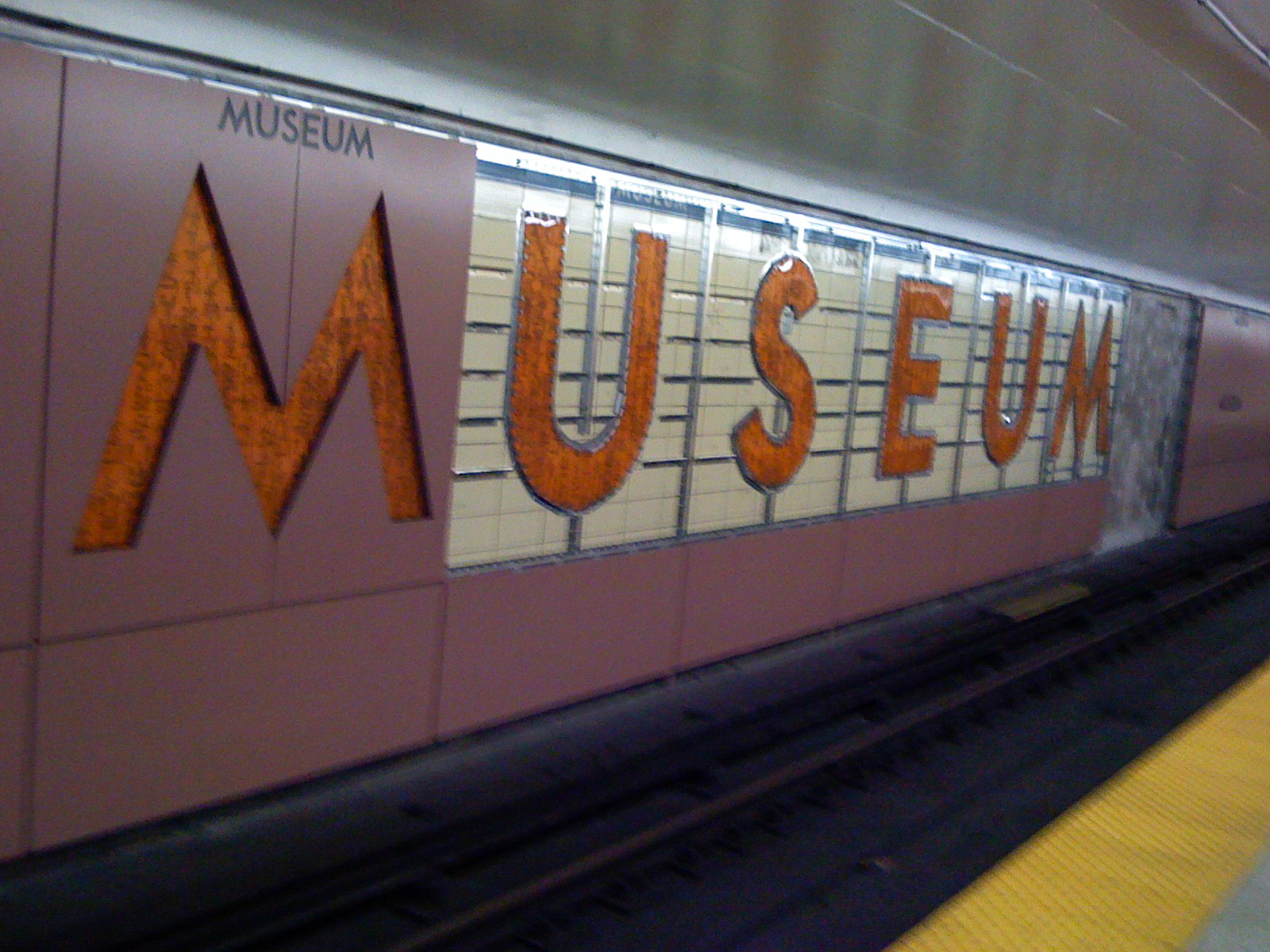
Original tiles being covered by new wall during renovation

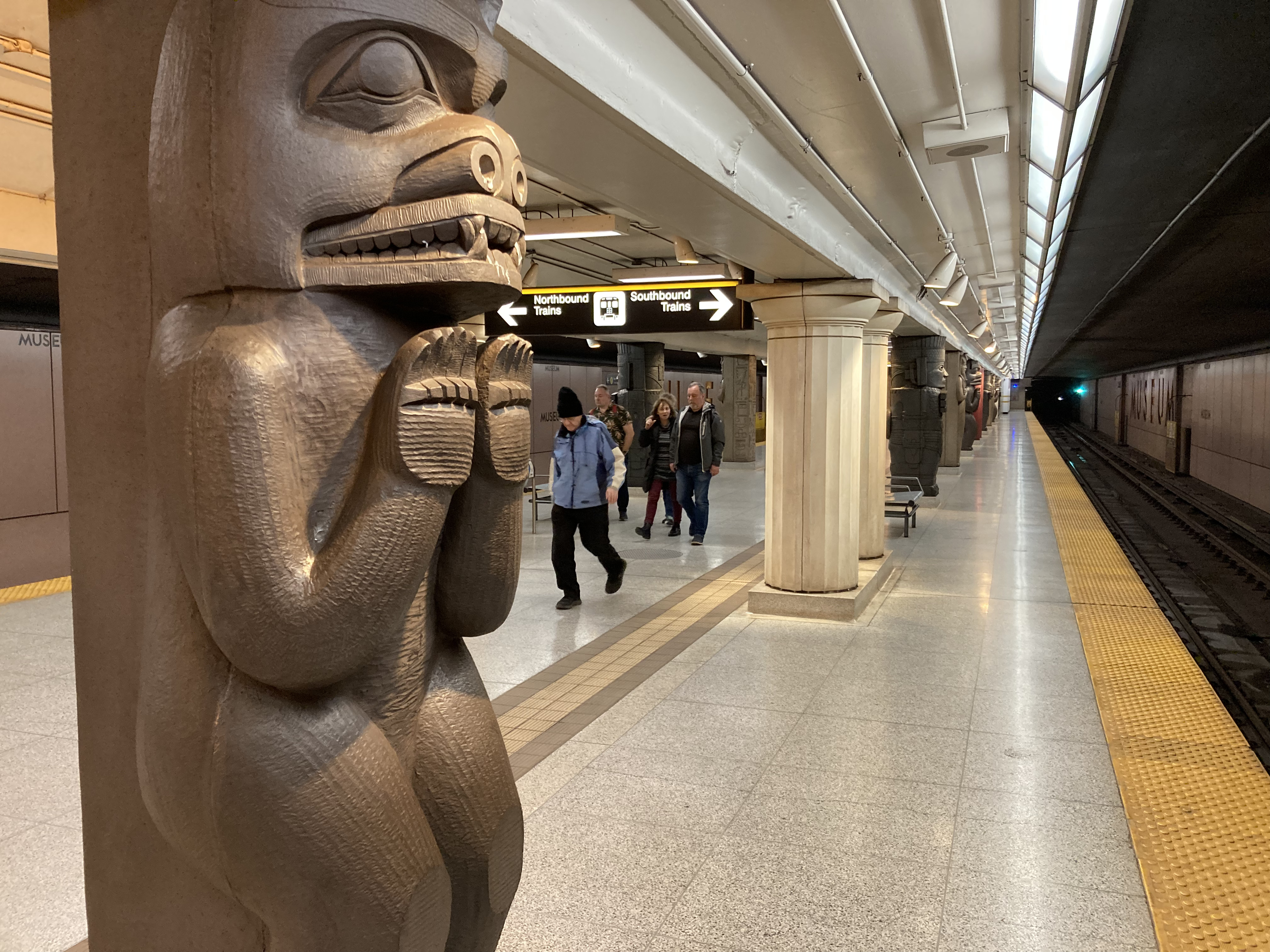
Museum-inspired columns after the makeover

== Nearby landmarks ==
In addition to the Royal Ontario Museum, nearby landmarks include the Gardiner Museum of Ceramic Art, the Royal Conservatory of Music, and the defunct McLaughlin Planetarium. The station is located on the northeast corner of the University of Toronto St. George campus, near Hart House, Trinity College, Victoria University, St. Michael's College, the Henry N.R. Jackman Faculty of Law, and the Faculty of Music.

== Surface connections ==
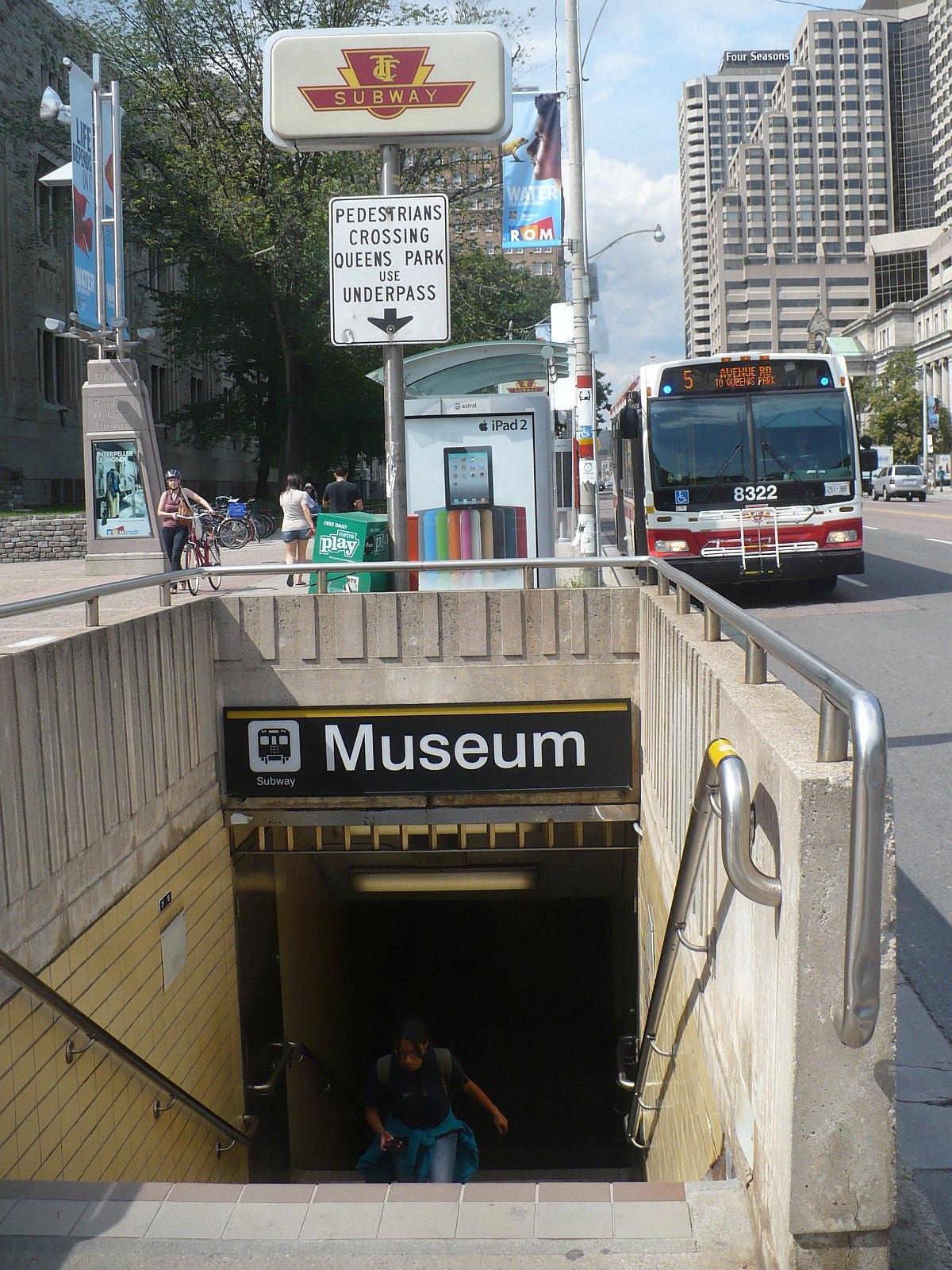
Museum station's west exit in front of its bus stop

A transfer is required to connect between the subway system and these surface routes:

TTC routes serving the station include:

Route	Name	Additional information
13A	Avenue Road	Northbound to Eglinton station
13B	Avenue Road	Northbound to Eglinton station and southbound to Gerrard Street West
94A	Wellesley	Eastbound to Castle Frank station via Wellesley station and westbound to Ossington station. Board buses at Queen's Park Crescent West.
