= 1975 Scarborough bus-train collision =

Deadly Toronto bus-train collision

Details
- Date: December 12, 1975
- Location: Scarborough, Ontario
- Coordinates: 43.7180°N 79.2543°W
- Country: Canada
- Operator: GO Transit; Toronto Transit Commission
- Incident type: Collision

Statistics
- Deaths: 9
- Injured: 16

The 1975 Scarborough bus-train collision occurred on December 12th 1975 when a Toronto Transit Commission bus travelling east on St. Clair Avenue was hit by a westbound GO Transit commuter train just north of Scarborough GO Station. Nine people were killed and sixteen injured, making it the deadliest crash in history for both GO Transit and the TTC.
