= Queen's Park station (Toronto) =

Toronto subway station

Queen's Park
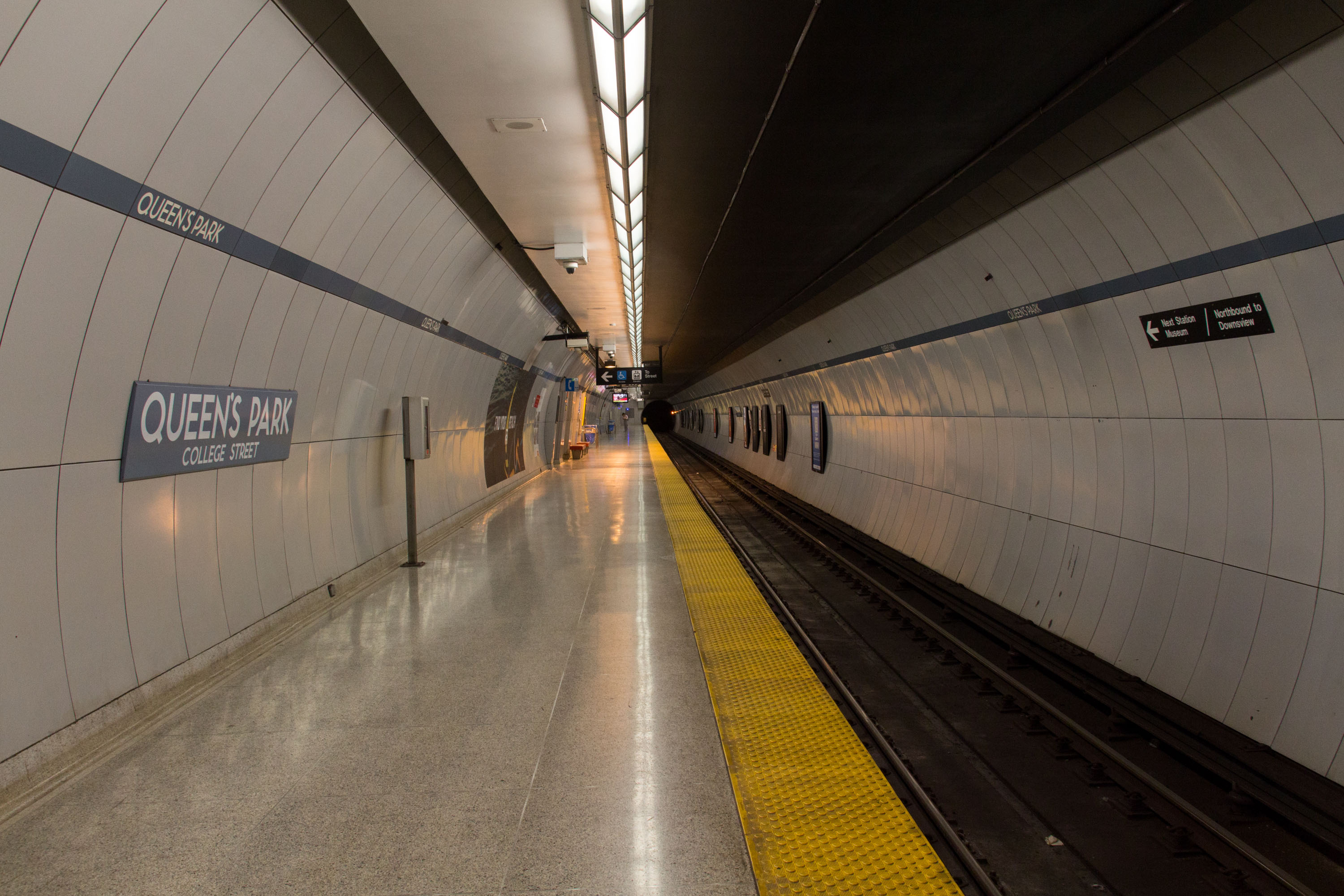

General information
- Location: 129 College Street; Toronto, Ontario; Canada
- Coordinates: 43°39′35″N 79°23′25″W
- Platforms: Centre platform
- Tracks: 2
- Connections: TTC buses and Streetcars: 13 Avenue Rd; 306 Carlton; 506 Carlton

Construction
- Structure type: Underground
- Accessible: Yes

Other information
- Website: Official station page

History
- Opened: February 28, 1963; 63 years ago

Passengers
- 2023–2024: 34,444
- Rank: 16 of 70

Services
Preceding station	Toronto Transit Commission	Following station
Museum towards Vaughan	Line 1 Yonge–University	St. Patrick towards Finch
Location

Queen's Park is a subway station on Line 1 Yonge–University in Toronto, Ontario, Canada. The station, which opened in 1963, is located under University Avenue at College Street.

The station is wheelchair-accessible and has had underground connections to adjoining buildings since 2002. Wi-Fi service is available at this station.

== Entrances ==
The mezzanine level of the station is located under the intersection of College Street and University Avenue/Queens Park and entrances are located at all four corners.

- Northwest entrance: The only uncovered stairwell entrance is located beside the Leslie L. Dan Pharmacy Building at the southeast corner of the University of Toronto St. George Campus.
- Northeast entrance: This is where the elevator between ground level and the ticketing mezzanine is situated. A different elevator provides further access to the train platform. There is a tunnel here connecting to the Ontario Government Buildings and other important destinations include the Ontario Legislative Building and Women's College Hospital.
- Southwest entrance: Twin escalators provide a direct connection to the Intact Centre, with Princess Margaret Cancer Centre, Mount Sinai Hospital and the Toronto Rehabilitation Institute being on the west side of University Avenue to the south.
- Southeast entrance: Beside this entrance is the MaRS Discovery District, where a connecting tunnel is to be constructed, and a short distance to the south are Toronto General Hospital and the Hospital for Sick Children.

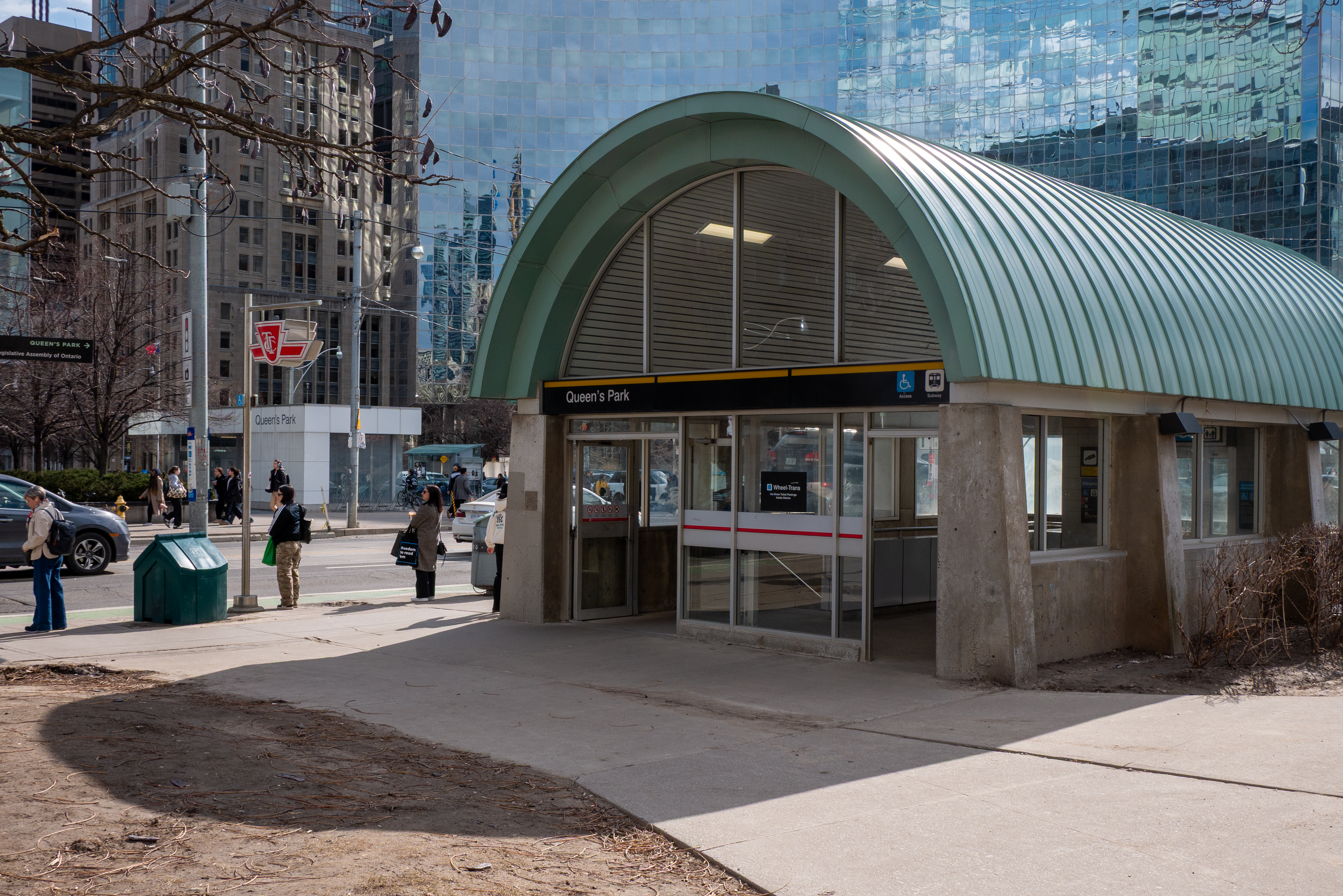
Northeast accessible entrance

== Architecture and art ==
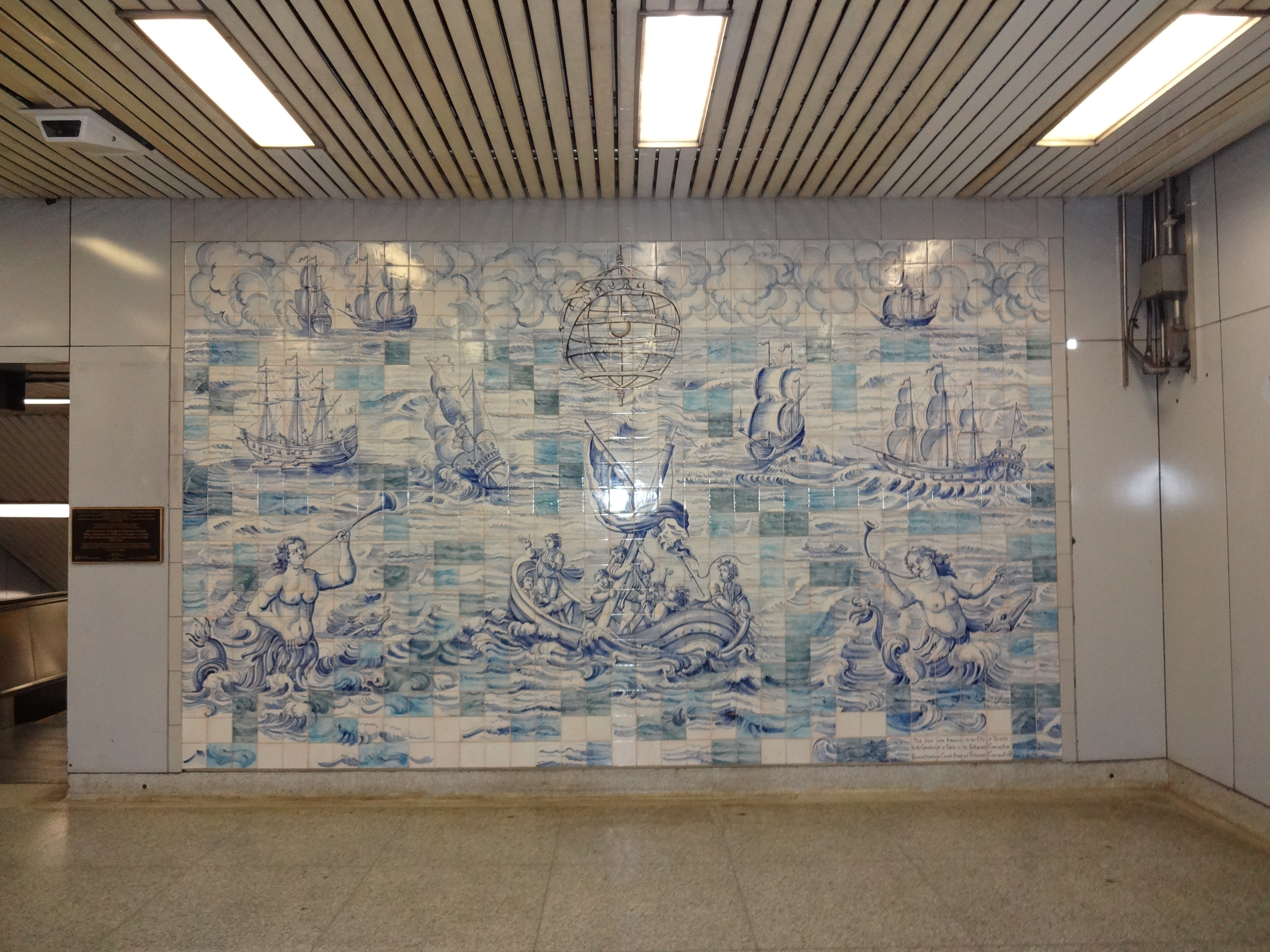
Ceramic tile mural displayed in the station mezzanine

The station is in a bored tunnel, and it is one of only two stations in the system to have a tubular shape, the other being the next station south at St. Patrick. North of the station, the tunnel curves east around the Ontario Legislative Building, then comes back to its original alignment centred under the road just before Museum Station

A ceramic tile mural, a gift from the Government of Portugal, is located within the fare-paid area of the mezzanine. The mural features subject matter inspired by Portuguese exploration of the New World. It was designed by Ana Vilela, manufactured by Viúva Lamego in Lisbon and installed here in 2003.

== Station improvements ==
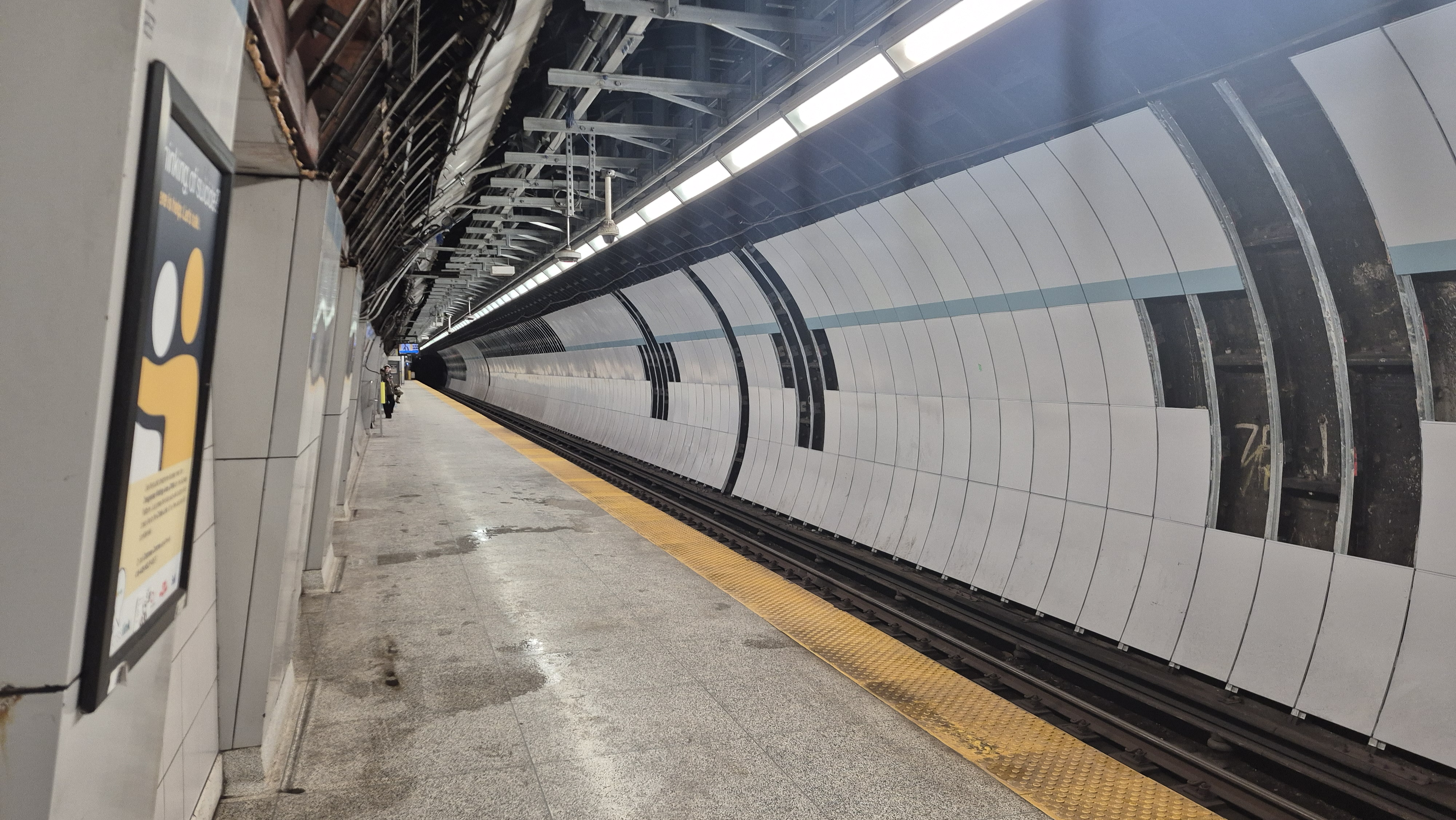
The steel frame exposed at Queen's Park station in early 2025 due to renovation work to replace the original wall cladding

As of January 2025, further renovations at the station have been ongoing since the fourth quarter of 2023, including asbestos removal and cosmetic upgrades such as new wall finishes. Some riders have expressed frustration with the station's safety and appearance due to a lack of proper wayfinding signage and missing tiles.

== Surface connections ==
A transfer is required to connect between the subway system and these surface routes:

TTC routes serving the station include:

Route	Name	Additional information
13A	Avenue Road	Northbound to Eglinton station
13B	Avenue Road	Northbound to Eglinton station and southbound to Gerrard Street West; Weekday middays only
306	Carlton	Blue Night streetcar service; eastbound to Main Street station and westbound to High Park Loop
506	Carlton	Streetcar; eastbound to Main Street station and westbound to High Park Loop

== See also ==
- Queen's Park
