= St. Patrick station =

Toronto subway station

St. Patrick
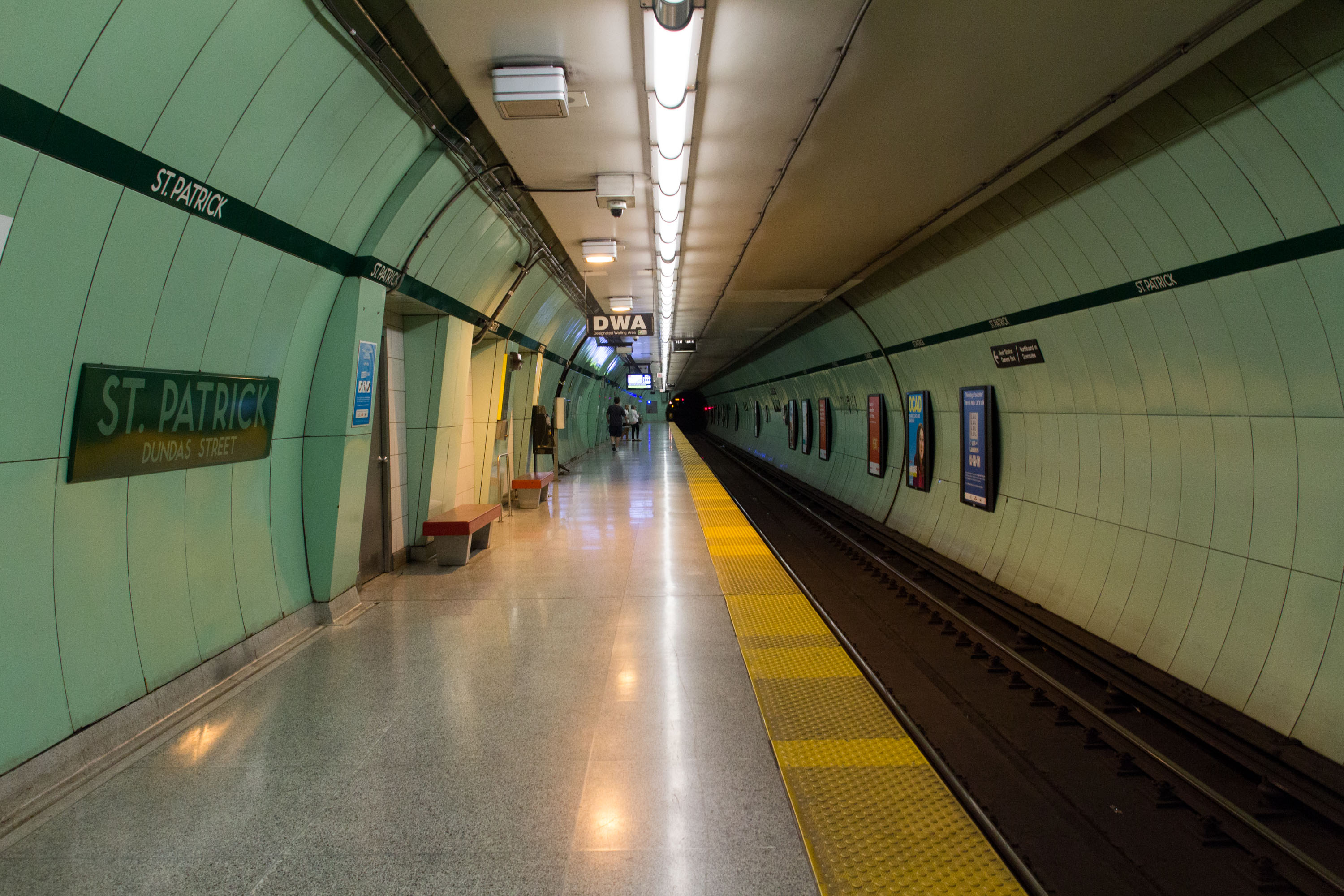

General information
- Location: 449 University Avenue; Toronto, Ontario; Canada
- Coordinates: 43°39′17″N 79°23′18″W
- Platforms: Centre platform
- Tracks: 2
- Connections: TTC buses and Streetcars: 305 Dundas; 505 Dundas

Construction
- Structure type: Underground
- Accessible: Yes

Other information
- Website: Official station page

History
- Opened: February 28, 1963; 63 years ago

Passengers
- 2023–2024: 23,989
- Rank: 24 of 70

Services
Preceding station	Toronto Transit Commission	Following station
Queen's Park towards Vaughan	Line 1 Yonge–University	Osgoode towards Finch
Location

St. Patrick is a subway station on Line 1 Yonge–University in Toronto, Ontario, Canada. It is located under University Avenue at Dundas Street West.

The station, which opened in 1963, is named for the nearby St. Patrick's Church. It is one of only two stations in the system to have a tubular shape created by the tunnel boring machine, the other such station being Queen's Park, the next station to the north.

The murder of Mariam Peters here in 1975 prompted the TTC to adopt system-wide safety measures such as the first police patrols on the subway and the installation of emergency telephones and alarms. One of the three cross passages was blocked off, as well as at Queen's Park station, to prevent it being used as a hiding spot for criminals.

== Nearby landmarks ==
The Canadian Airman's Memorial was erected in the median of University Avenue above the station in 1984. Nearby landmarks include St. Patrick's Church, The Michener Institute, the Royal Canadian Military Institute, the Consulate General of the United States, the Art Gallery of Ontario, the Textile Museum of Canada, the Ontario College of Art and Design, and the Hospital for Sick Children. It is also within a very short walking distance, west along Dundas Street, to the original Chinatown.

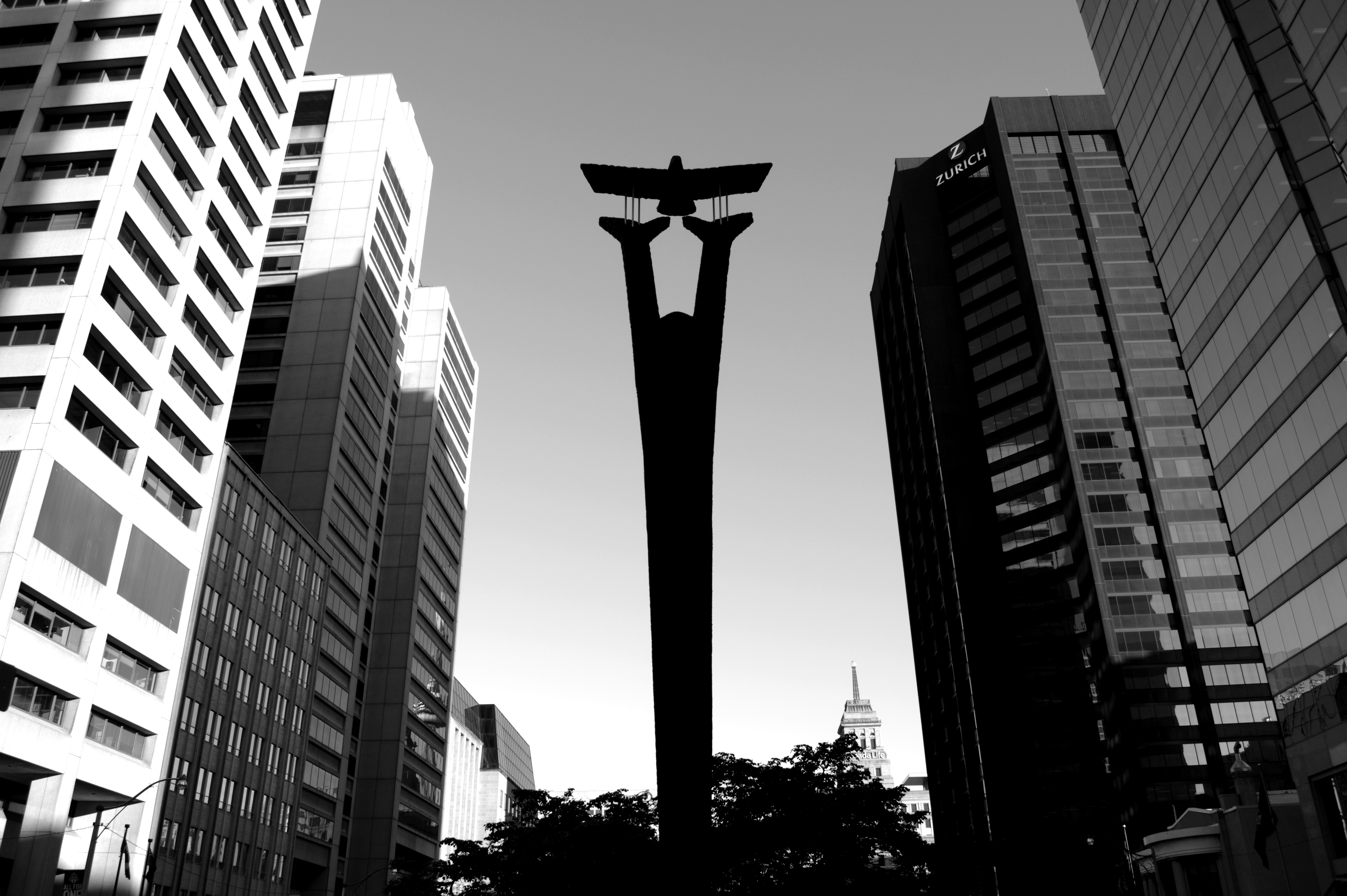
Canadian Airman's Memorial

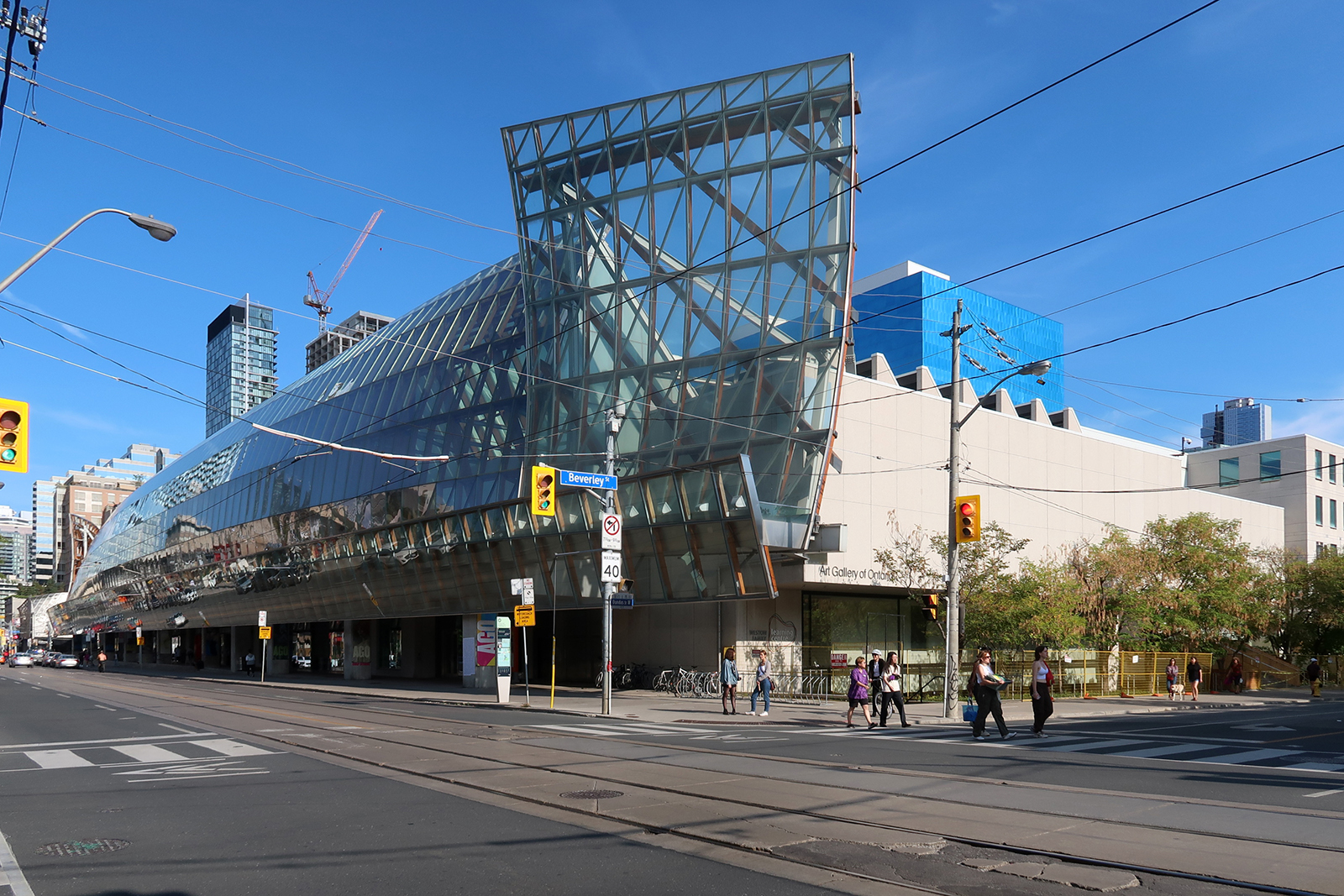
Art Gallery of Ontario

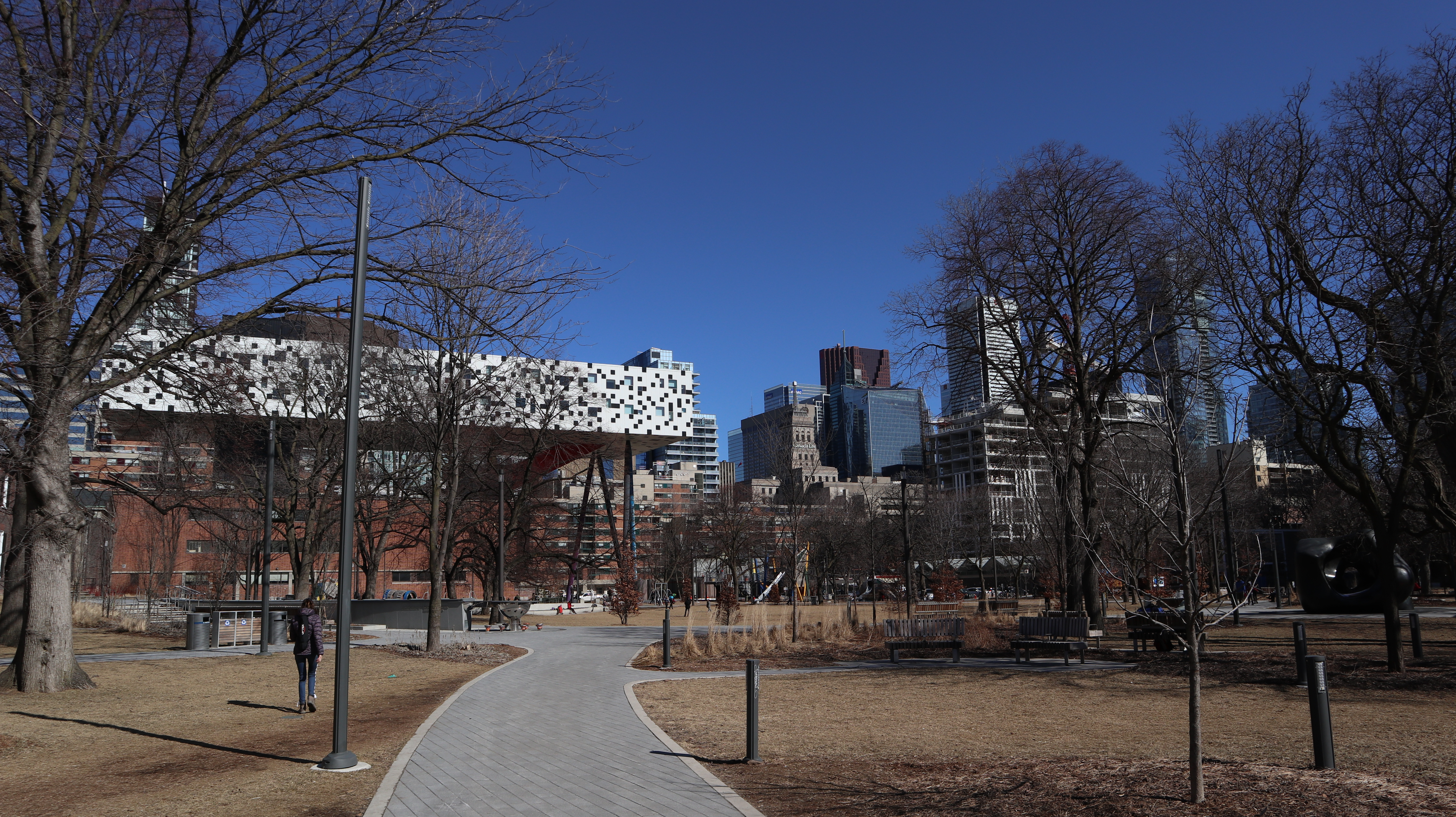
OCAD

== Surface connections ==
A transfer is required to connect between the subway system and these surface routes:

TTC routes serving the station include:

Route	Name	Additional information
305	Dundas	Streetcar; Blue Night service; eastbound to Broadview station and westbound to Dundas West station
505	Dundas	Streetcar; eastbound to Broadview station and westbound to Dundas West station

== Station improvements ==
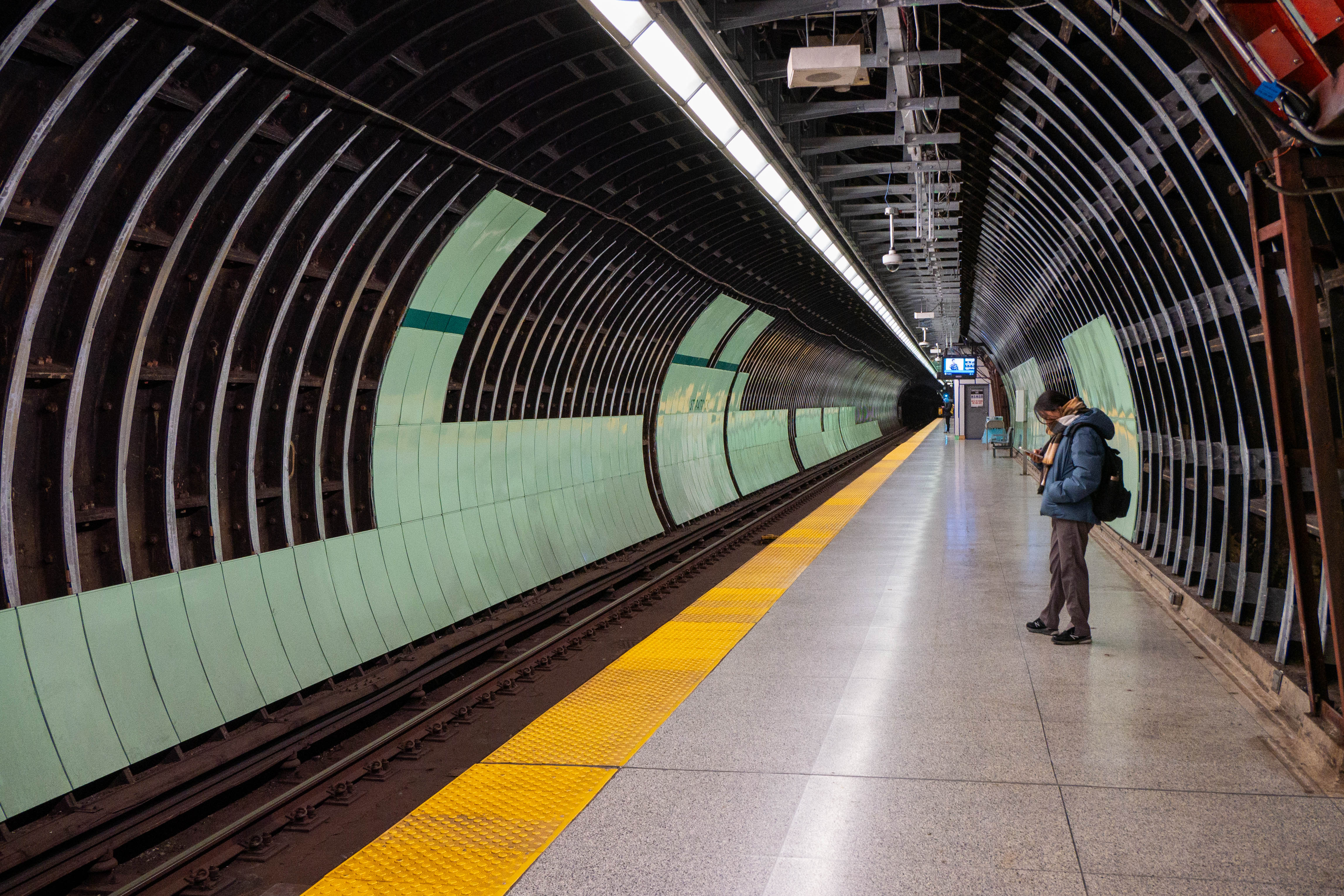
The steel frame exposed at St. Patrick station in early 2025 during renovation work to replace the original wall cladding

St. Patrick Station was listed on the Toronto Community Foundation's list of stations which they expressed interest in donating funds for platform level appearance improvements. The organization successfully raised funds and designed the renovations of Museum station.

As part of its Easier Access Program, the TTC added two new elevators, one from a new street level entrance to the concourse level, and a second from the concourse to the platform level. Construction started in late 2017 and renovations were fully completed by December 4, 2018. A ceremony was held on March 5, 2019, to officially celebrate St. Patrick as the 45th accessible TTC subway station.

Station enhancements also included the artwork titled Many Little Plans by artist Barbara Todd. The artwork consists of over 400 ceramic tiles and is installed in alcoves at the platform level.

As of January 2025, further renovations at the station have been ongoing since the fourth quarter of 2023, including asbestos removal and cosmetic upgrades such as new wall finishes. Some riders have expressed frustration with the station's safety and appearance due to a lack of proper wayfinding signage and missing tiles.
