= York Mills =

- Neighbourhood
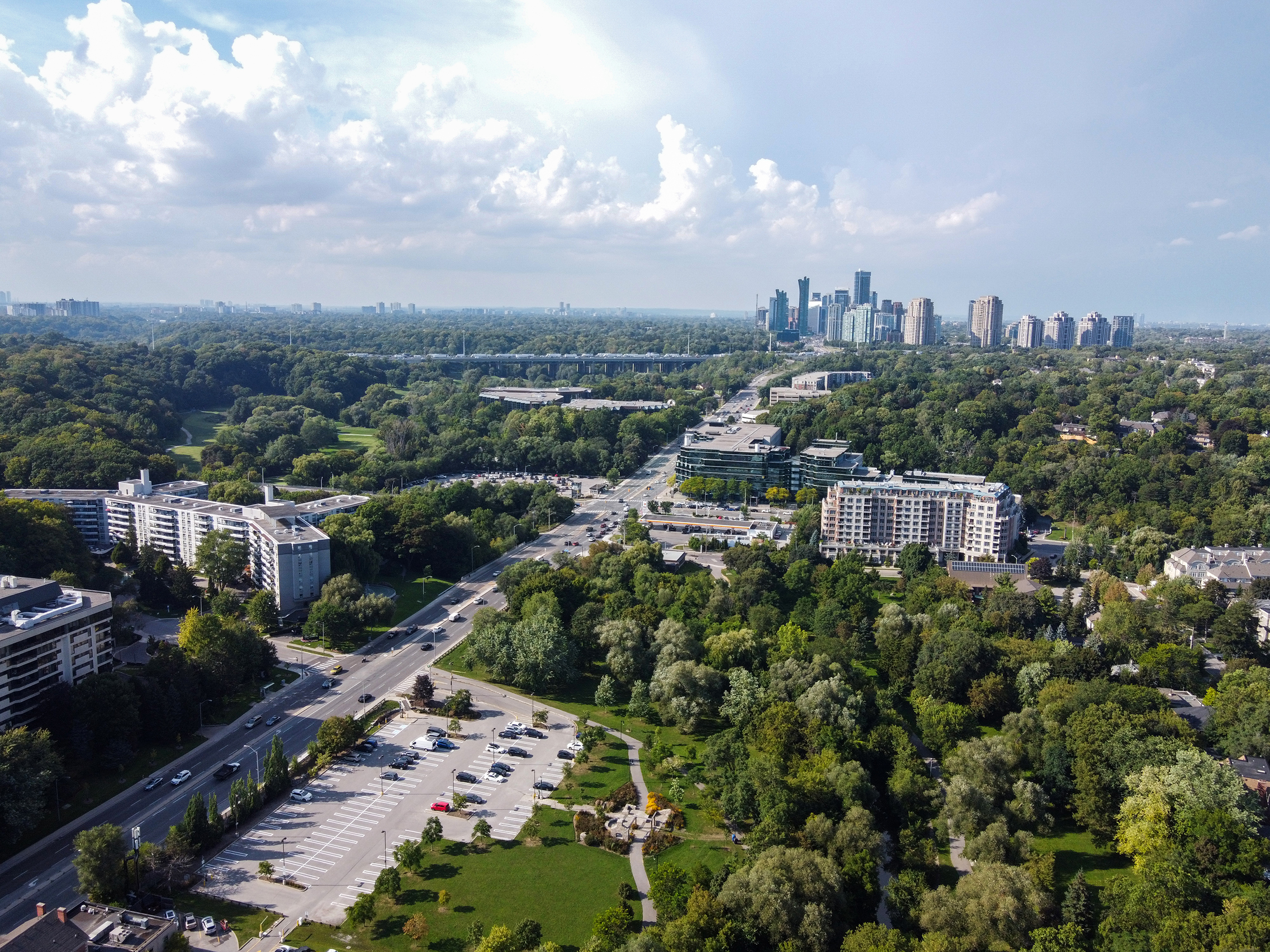
- Aerial view of York Mills in 2023

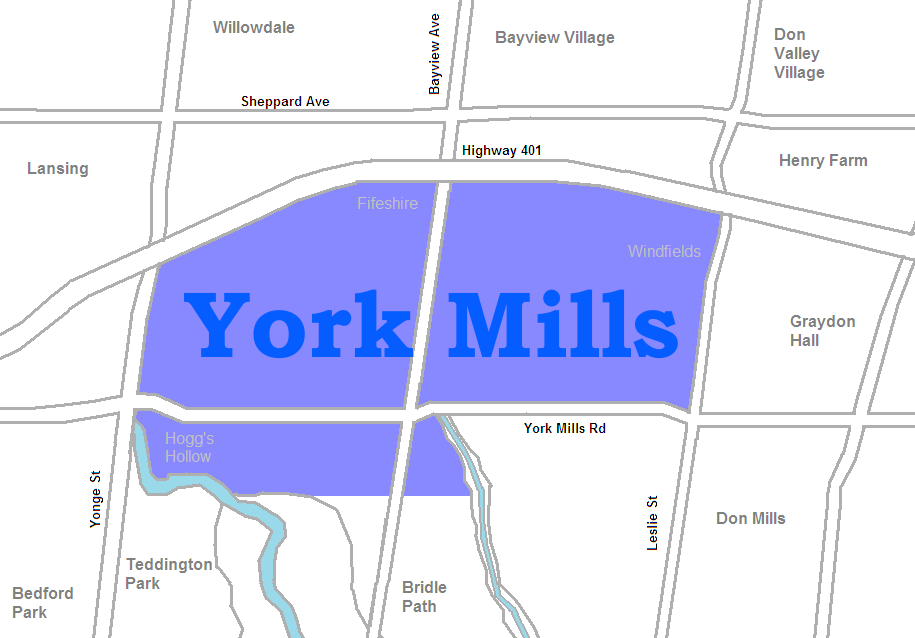
- Coordinates: 43°44′35″N 79°24′24″W
- Country: Canada
- Province: Ontario
- City: Toronto
- Municipality established: 1850 York Township
- Changed municipality: 1922 North York from York Township
- Changed municipality: 1998 Toronto from North York

Government
  - MP: Rob Oliphant (Don Valley West)
  - MPP: Stephanie Bowman (Don Valley West)
  - Councillor: Rachel Chernos Lin (Ward 15 Don Valley West)

York Mills is a neighbourhood in Toronto, Ontario, Canada. It is centred around Yonge Street and York Mills Road located in the district of North York. In 2010, it encompassed the fourth and seventh most affluent postal codes in Canada. It is recognized as a millionaires' mile, alongside the other Toronto neighbourhoods of The Bridle Path, Forest Hill, and Rosedale.

Part of the area is also known as Hoggs Hollow, named for James Hogg, a Scottish settler who settled in the area in 1824 and operated the mill on Yonge Street at the Don River north of the Town of York (now Toronto), by his sons John and William in 1856. Another portion is named St. Andrew-Windfields. St. Andrew-Windfields most famous resident was the popular Canadian Philanthropist E. P. Taylor who left Canada towards the latter years of his life and donated Parkland (now Windfields Park) and his mansion (now the Canadian Film Centre).

== History ==
The area name is linked to saw and grist mills that dotted the Don River, which flows through York Mills. The Town of York Mills became part of the Township of North York.

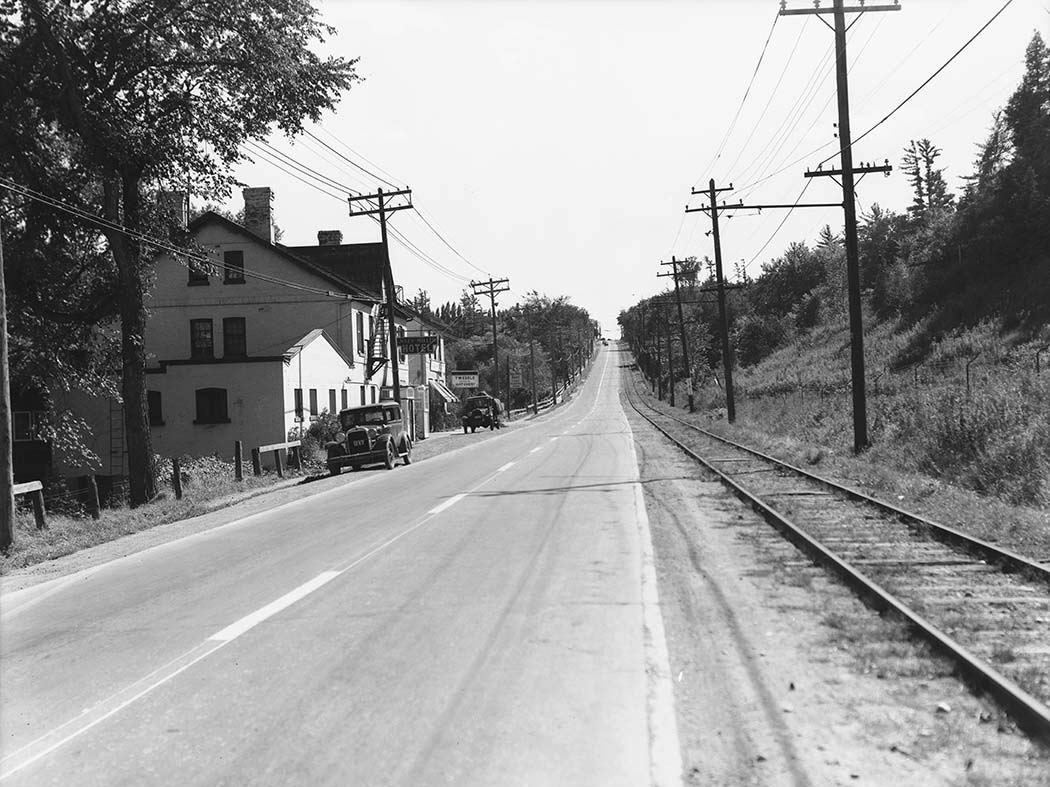
View of the TTC's North Yonge Railways line in York Mills, 1936.

The area once linked by radial railways (Metropolitan line and the successor North Yonge Railways) and Highway 11, now can be reached via Highway 401, GO Transit, and Toronto Transit Commission buses and York Mills station on the Yonge-University Spadina subway line.

In 1953, York Mills, along with North York, was severed from York County, joining other municipalities to form the regional government of Metropolitan Toronto. The area was the site of a tragic accident on March 17, 1960, when five Italian construction workers on a water main project were killed in a tunnel fire. North York later became a borough, and then a city, and was merged with five other municipalities and a regional government to form the new "City of Toronto" in 1998.

Today, the area is home to luxury condos and high-end homes. Houses in York Mills are highly distinguishable and contribute greatly to the proclaimed affluence of the neighbourhood. 50% of occupied dwellings are single detached houses. Many have been rebuilt and customized to taste, with heavily renovated front yards. In between 2001 and 2006, property values have increased by 47.6%. The second type of most occupied dwelling is apartments reaching five or more storeys, inhabited by 28% of the population. The average price for condominiums in the area ranges from C$800,000 to C$3,000,000, while the average price of a detached home is just above C$4,000,000.

=== St. Andrew's Golf Course ===
From 1927 to 1950s the area south of Highway 401 and east of Yonge Street was home to St. Andrew's Golf Course. Designed by Stanley Thompson as an 18-hole course and later as 27 hole course, it was sold to developers and now a residential area centred at Old Yonge Street and the Links Road. The course hosted the Canadian Open in 1935 and 1936.

== Geography ==
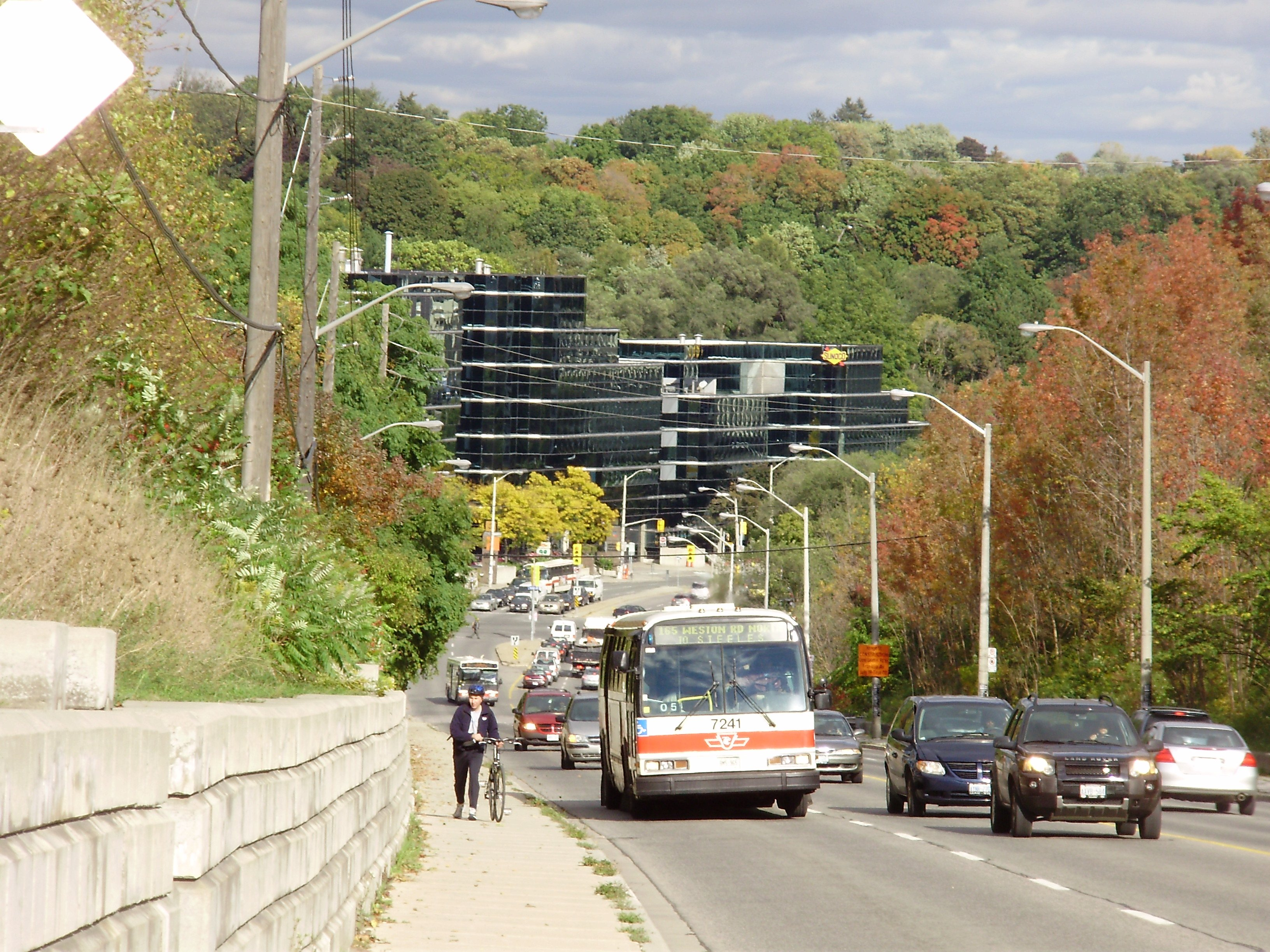
The Toronto ravine system is prominently featured in the neighbourhood.

From Yonge Street eastward, the roads slope upward but plateau as they reach Bayview Avenue. The natural environment is also highly integrated into the neighbourhood, with development seeming to build around it. The presence of greenery is a protected and distinguishable feature of York Mills.

=== Man-made environment ===
South of York Mills Road and Yonge Street sits the sub-neighbourhood of Hoggs Hollow. Houses in this residential area are embedded into the natural landscape, which ascends southward. The directional slope and other natural features serve as identifiable landmarks, edges, and paths, making this area highly legible in terms of a Lynchian analysis. The area has more community-oriented characteristics that make it distinct from the rest of York Mills. Most notably, residents manage a community board located in the centre of this sub-neighbourhood.

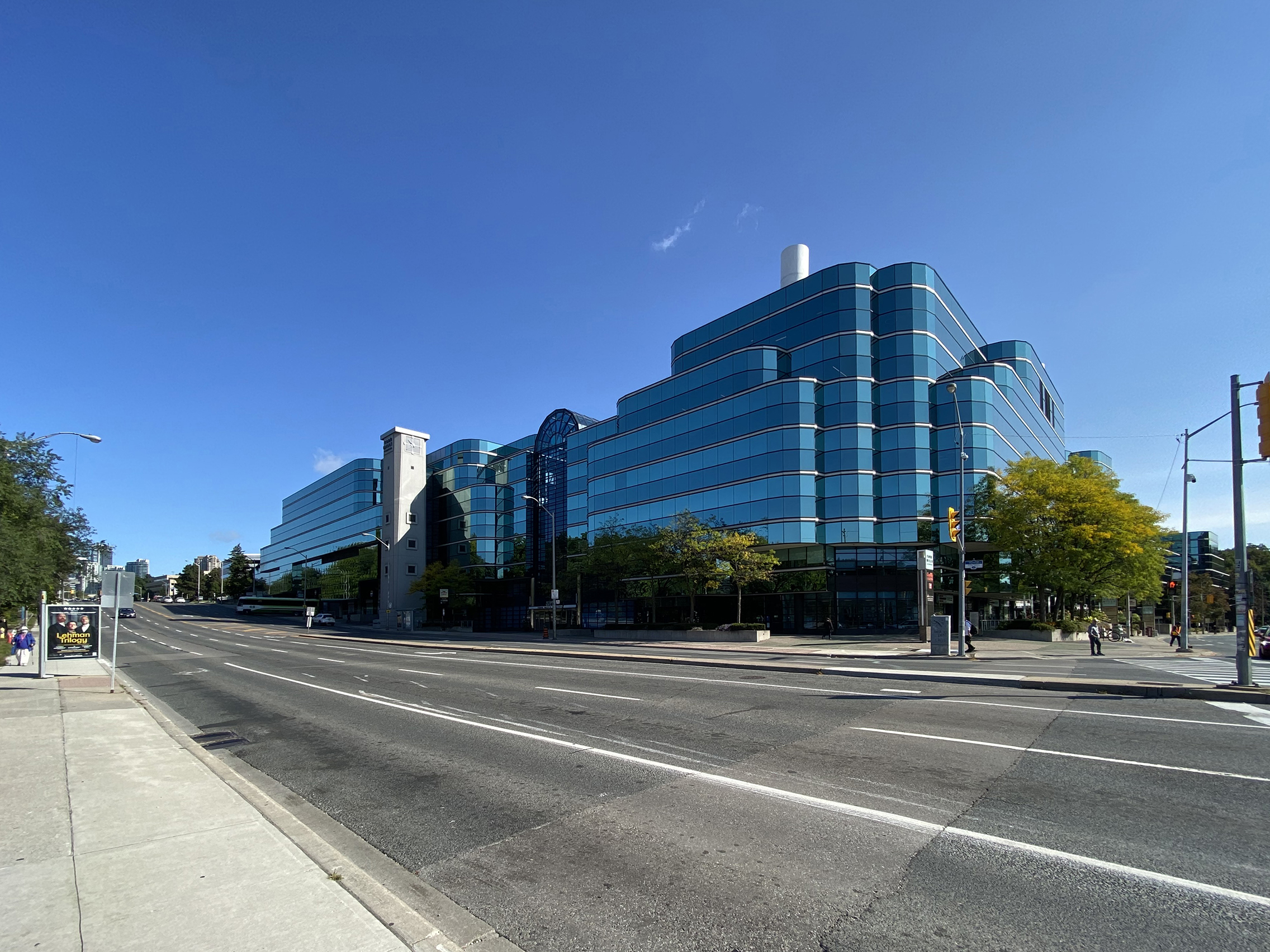
York Mills Centre is the tallest commercial building in the neighbourhood.

As York Mills is a mainly residential neighbourhood, commercial activity occurs strictly at intersections of major arterials. At Yonge Street and York Mills Road, the tallest commercial building in the neighbourhood, York Mills Centre, holds large office and retail spaces.

Along York Mills Road in between major intersections, there are only single detached houses. The pedestrian paths are very close to roads. Residential area here leaves no space for any commercial opportunities, thus commercial nodes are only available at the intersection of major arterial roads.

There is very little public space. Properly maintained parks are often playgrounds for children. Actual parks do not properly serve the public as well with its lack of seating and walkways, which discourages overall usage. Free parking compared to the high hourly rates of the rest of Toronto points to space in York Mills as being an inexpensive commodity, yet there is very little space actually available for development. The current Official Plan does not provide for the anticipation of future development.

==== Landmarks ====
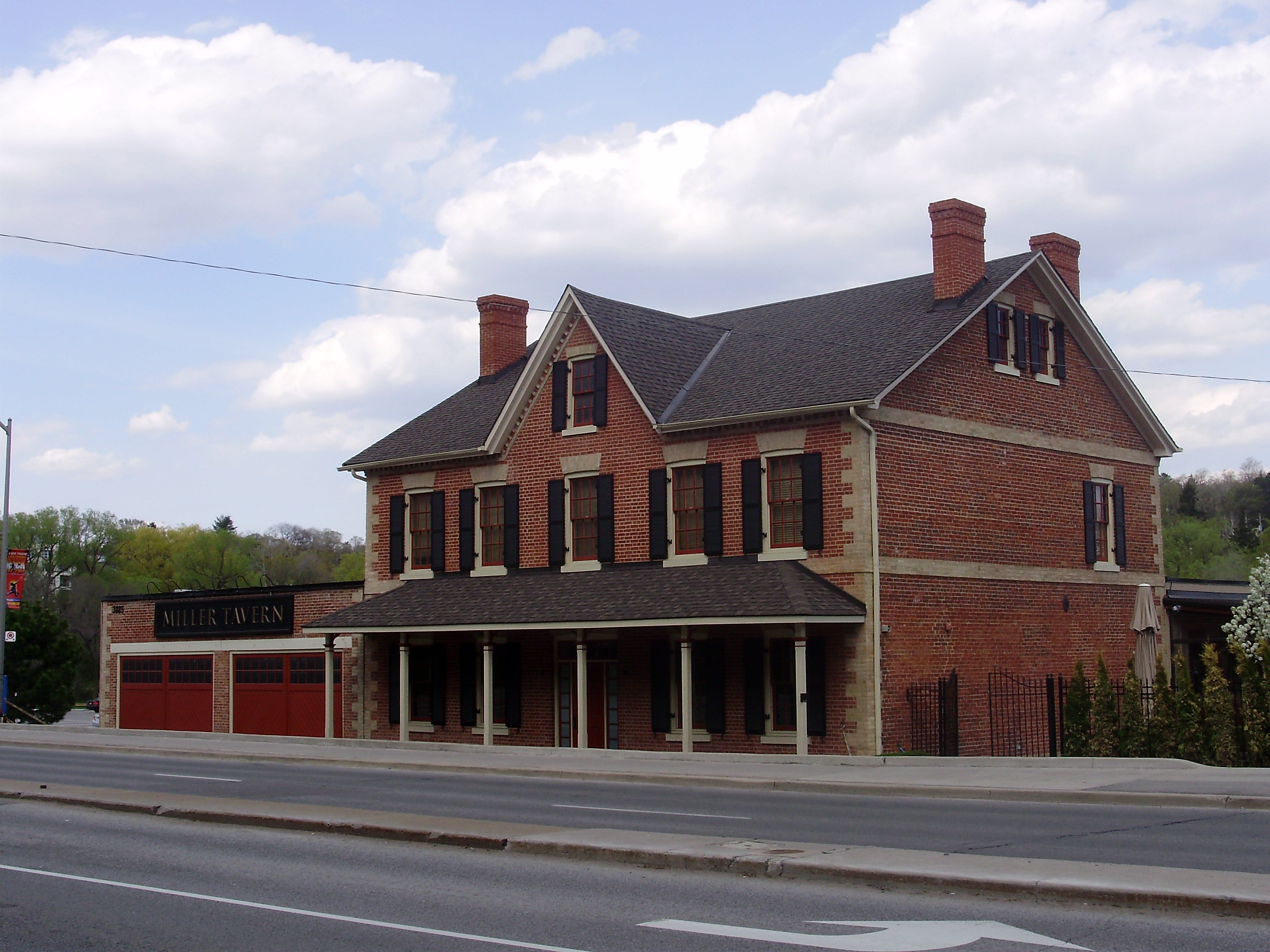
Built in 1857, Miller Tavern is a local landmark in York Mills.

Points of interest in York Mills:

- George S. Pratt House
- Miller Tavern
- St. John's Anglican Church
- William and Elizabeth Harrison House
- Windfields Park

== Education ==
Two public school boards operate schools in York Mills, the English-first language Toronto District School Board (TDSB), and the French-first language Conseil scolaire Viamonde (CSV).

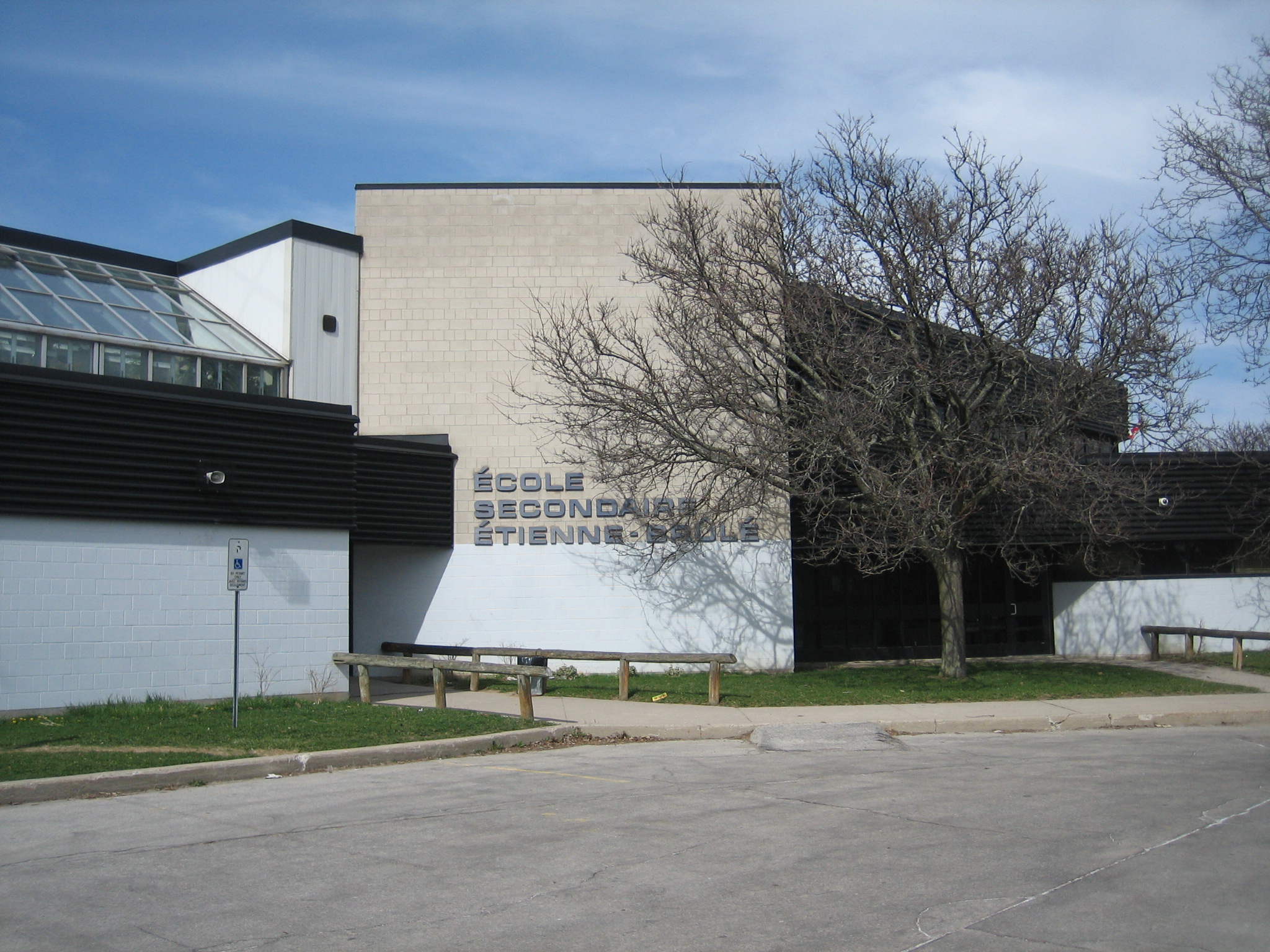
École secondaire Étienne-Brûlé is one of two public secondary schools located in York Mills.

TDSB also operates one secondary school in the neighbourhood, York Mills Collegiate Institute.

TDSB also operate six schools that provide primary education. They include:

- Dunlace Public School
- Harrison Public School
- Owen Public School
- St. Andrew's Middle School
- Windfield Middle School

CSV operates one secondary school in the neighbourhood, École secondaire Étienne-Brûlé. They do not operate an elementary school in the neighbourhood, with CSV elementary students residing in York Mills, attending schools in other neighbourhood.

The separate school boards for the City of Toronto, the English-based Toronto Catholic District School Board (TCDSB), and the French-based Conseil scolaire catholique MonAvenir (CSCM) also offer schooling to residents of York Mills, although they do not operate a school in the neighbourhood, with CSCM/TCDSB students attending schools situated in other neighbourhoods in Toronto.

== Transportation ==
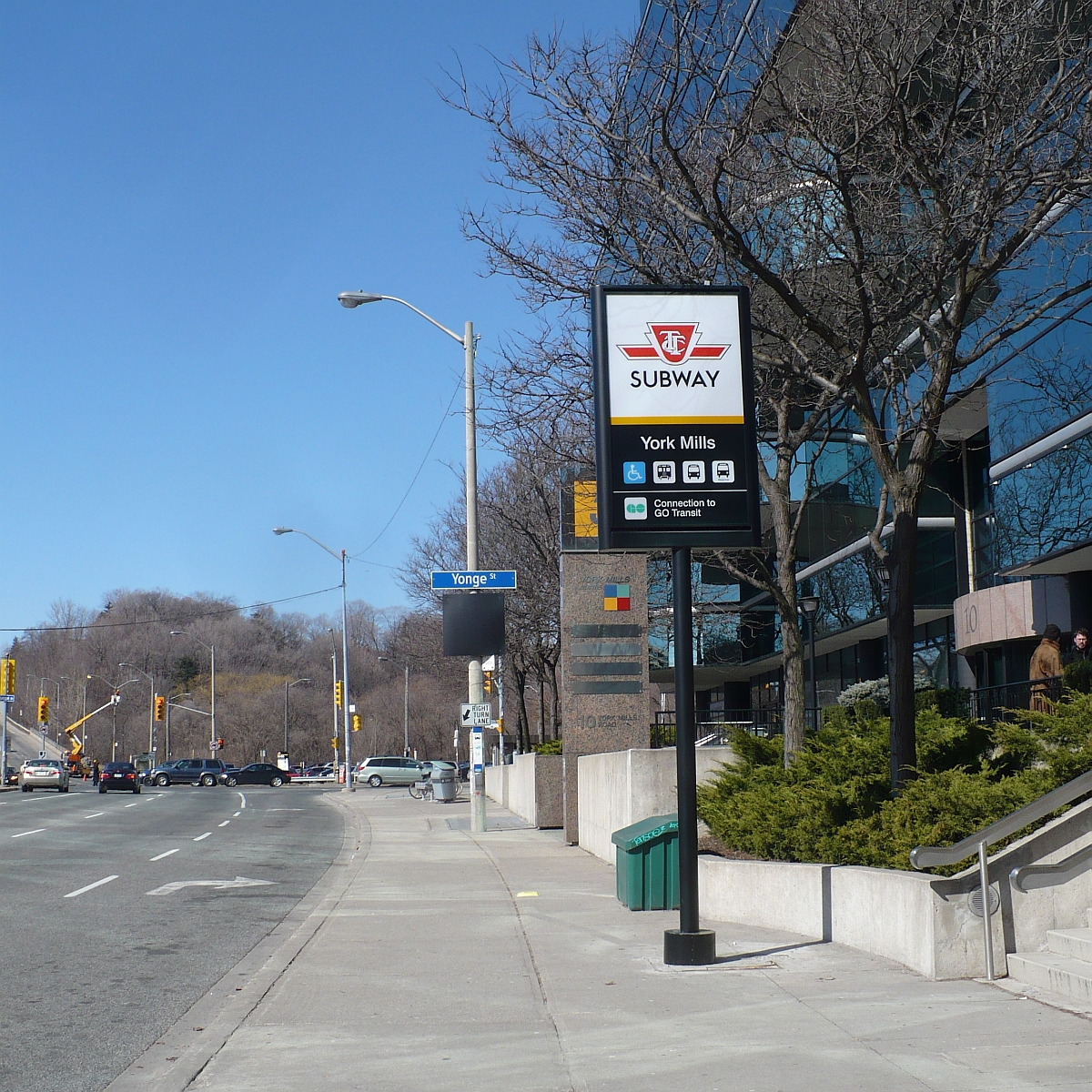
York Mills station is a subway station in York Mills.

As a result of the man-made environment, large lots, and sprawled out nodes of commercial activity, the neighbourhood is highly reliant on the automobile for everyday activities, with approximately two thirds of the York Mills population using it as a primary mode of transportation . Having Highway 401 in such close proximity adds to the benefits of owning a car, as the degree of mobility to the rest of Toronto greatly increases. Public transit is reported to be less than a quarter of the population's primary method of commute.

Deeper in the residential areas, pedestrian walkways are often only found on one side of the road. As much of the land surrounding the major arterials are claimed by private residences, there is no room to develop along pedestrian paths and make walking a more appealing option. The combined effect of this lack of appeal, poor infrastructural maintenance, and extended distance in between points of interests justify the populations' avoidance of walking, with a mere three percent of the population claim walking as their primary mode of commute. York Mills is an example of a neighbourhood stuck within the cycle of auto-dependency.

Public transportation is provided by the Toronto Transit Commission (TTC). Services provided TTC include Line 1 Yonge–University of the Toronto subway, and several bus routes. The TTC operates one subway station in the neighbourhood, York Mills station. Oriole GO Station is also situated in the northeast of the neighbourhood, providing access to GO Transit's regional commuter railway.
