= York Mills station =

Toronto subway station

York Mills
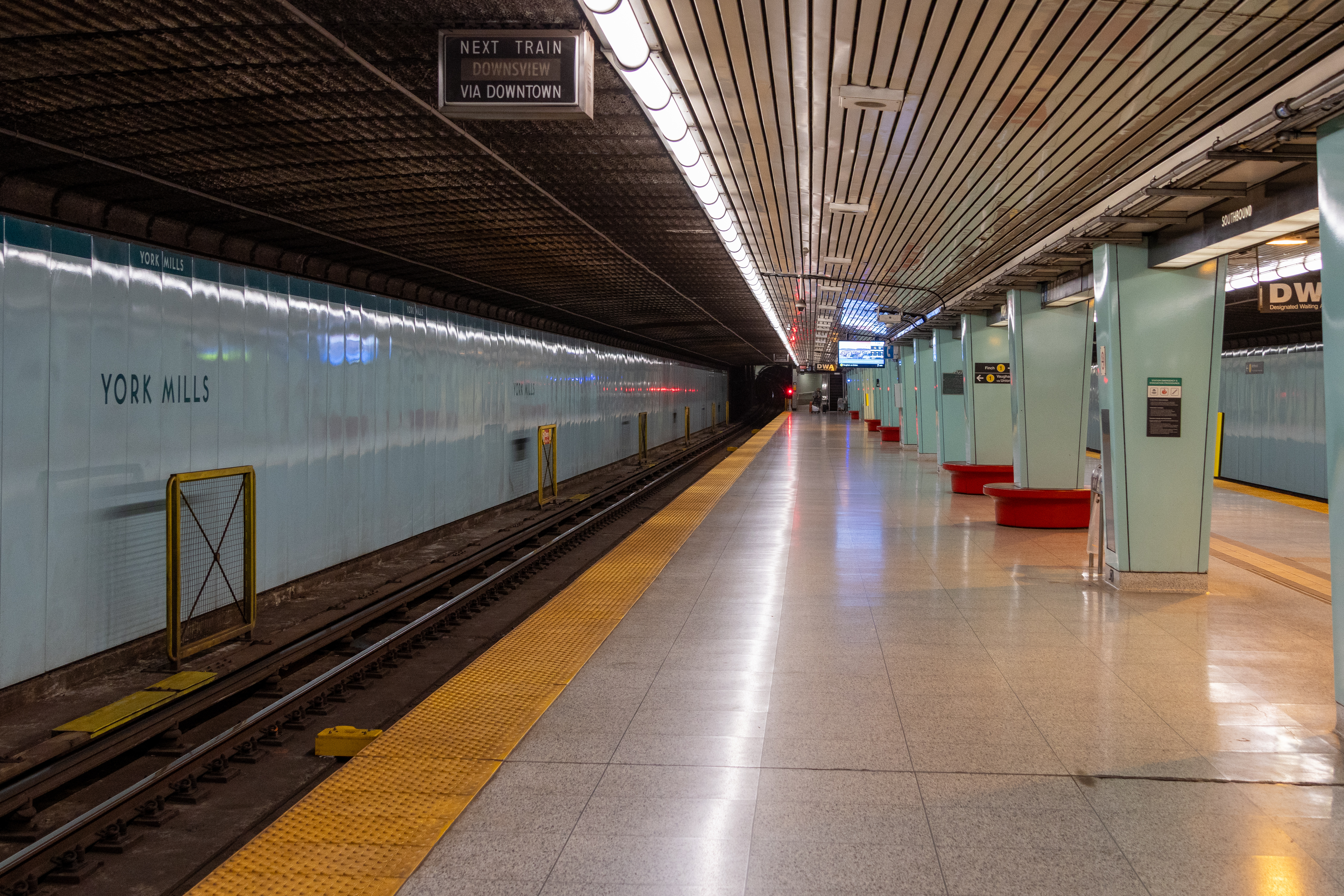

General information
- Location: 4015 Yonge Street; Toronto, Ontario; Canada
- Coordinates: 43°44′38″N 79°24′24″W
- Platforms: Centre platform
- Tracks: 2
- Connections: TTC buses: 78 St Andrews; 95 York Mills; 96 Wilson; 97 Yonge; 115 Silver Hills; 122 Graydon Hall; 165 Weston Rd North; 320 Yonge; 395 York Mills; 396 Wilson; 995 York Mills Express; 996 Wilson Express; York Mills Bus Terminal

Construction
- Structure type: Underground
- Accessible: Yes

Other information
- Website: Official station page

History
- Opened: March 31, 1973; 53 years ago
- Rebuilt: 2015

Passengers
- 2023–2024: 20,498
- Rank: 32 of 70

Services
Preceding station	Toronto Transit Commission	Following station
Lawrence towards Vaughan	Line 1 Yonge–University	Sheppard–Yonge towards Finch
Location

York Mills is a subway station on Line 1 Yonge–University in Toronto, Ontario, Canada. It is located at 4015 Yonge Street at the intersection of Wilson Avenue and York Mills Road in the neighbourhood of Hoggs Hollow.

== History ==
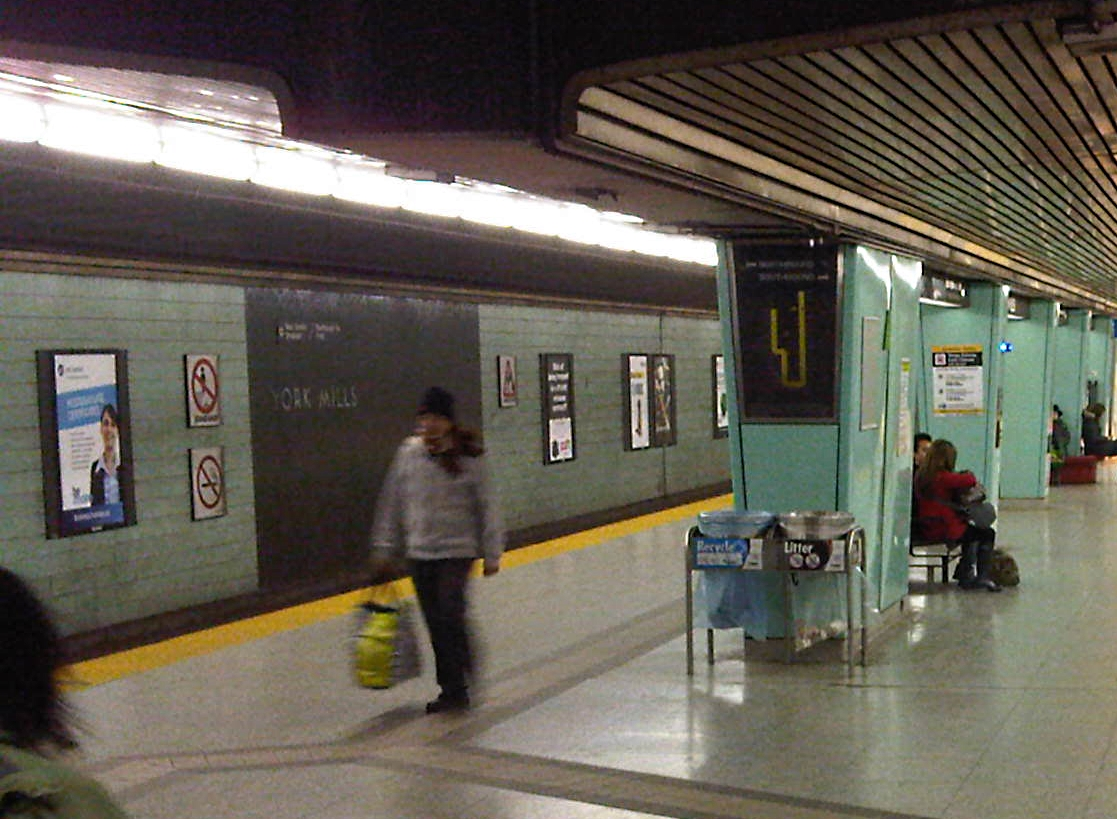
Original York Mills station wall tiles

The station opened in 1973, in what was then the Borough of North York, and replaced Eglinton as the northern terminus of the Yonge line. One year later, the subway was extended to Finch.

The original bus terminal was above ground, in a standard island configuration surrounded by bus bays, and at that time was also used by GO Transit buses, with transfers required for connecting TTC buses.

The current underground TTC bus platforms and GO Bus Terminal were built between 1985 and 1992 with the development of the York Mills Centre, with the TTC platforms inside the fare-paid area.

In 2007, this station became accessible with elevators.

By 2015, the tiles on the walls, floors and stairs had been replaced at this station. On the outer walls at track level the alternating light and dark green tiles were replaced by very light green metal panels with a dark green accent strip along the top. Moreover, in 2015 the station's 263 space commuter parking lot was sold to developers.

== Entrances ==
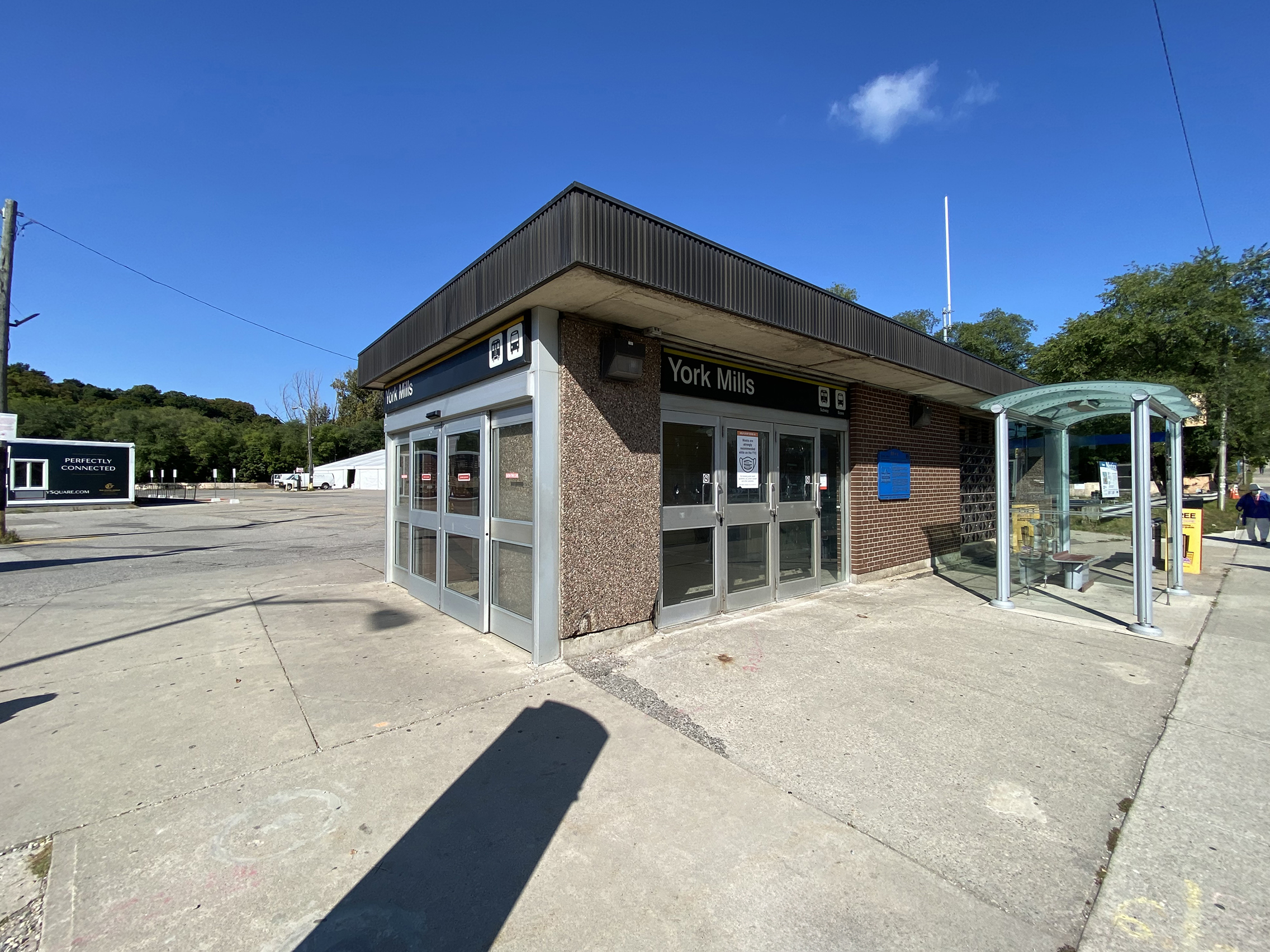
Entrance at the northwest corner of Wilson and Yonge, with the parking lot behind it

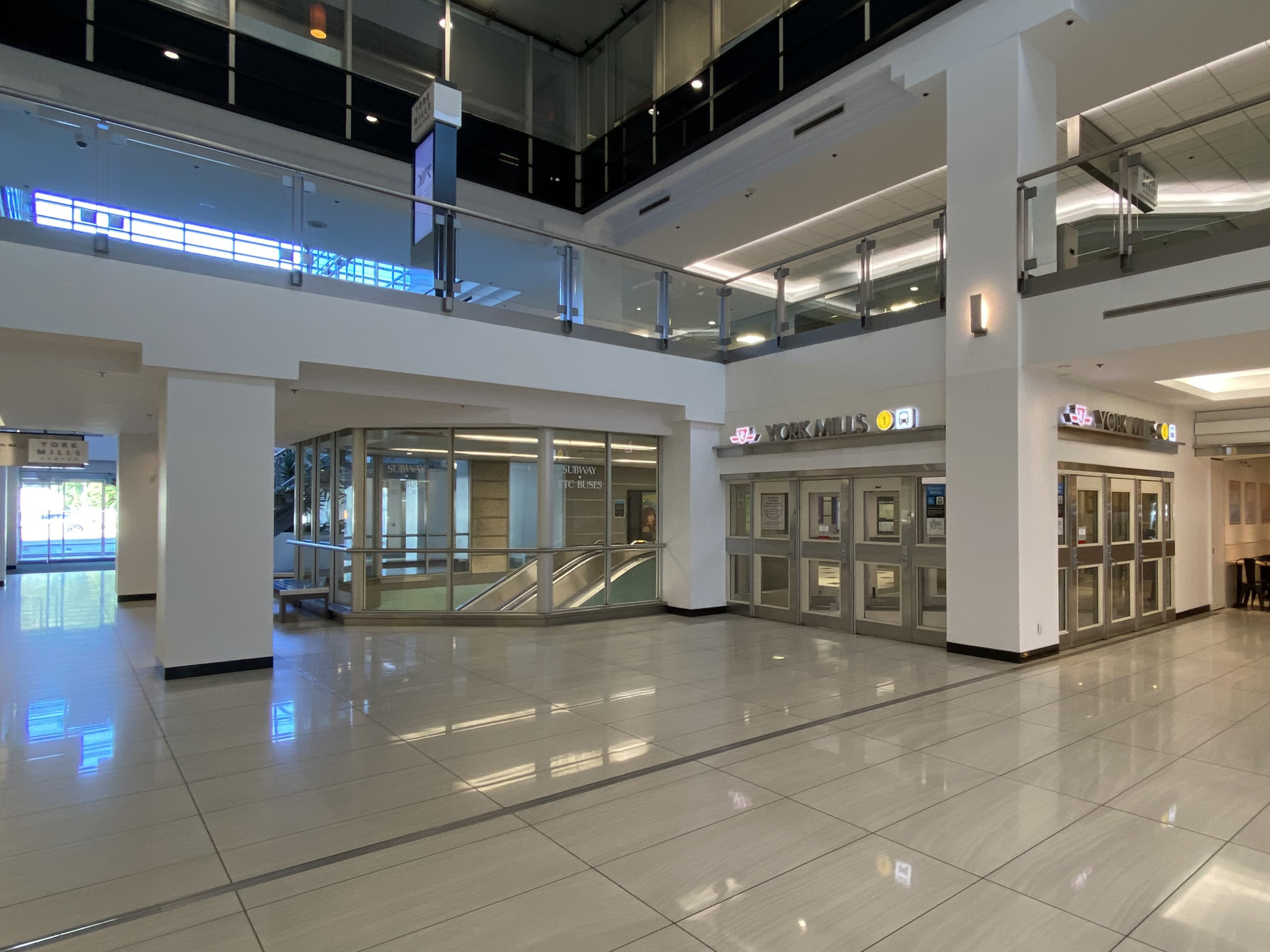
York Mills Centre TTC subway entrance

- Northwest corner of Wilson and Yonge – street level entrance
- Northeast corner of York Mills and Yonge – entrance via York Mills Centre
- Old York Mills Road east of Yonge – Kiss and Ride, automatic entrance (accessible only by Presto card as of February 2018)

The construction of a mixed-use development at the northwest corner of Wilson Avenue and Yonge Street requires the demolition of the subway station entrance at that corner. As of July 2022, the TTC is planning a new accessible entrance to be built within the new development. The expected completion is in 2025.

== Art ==
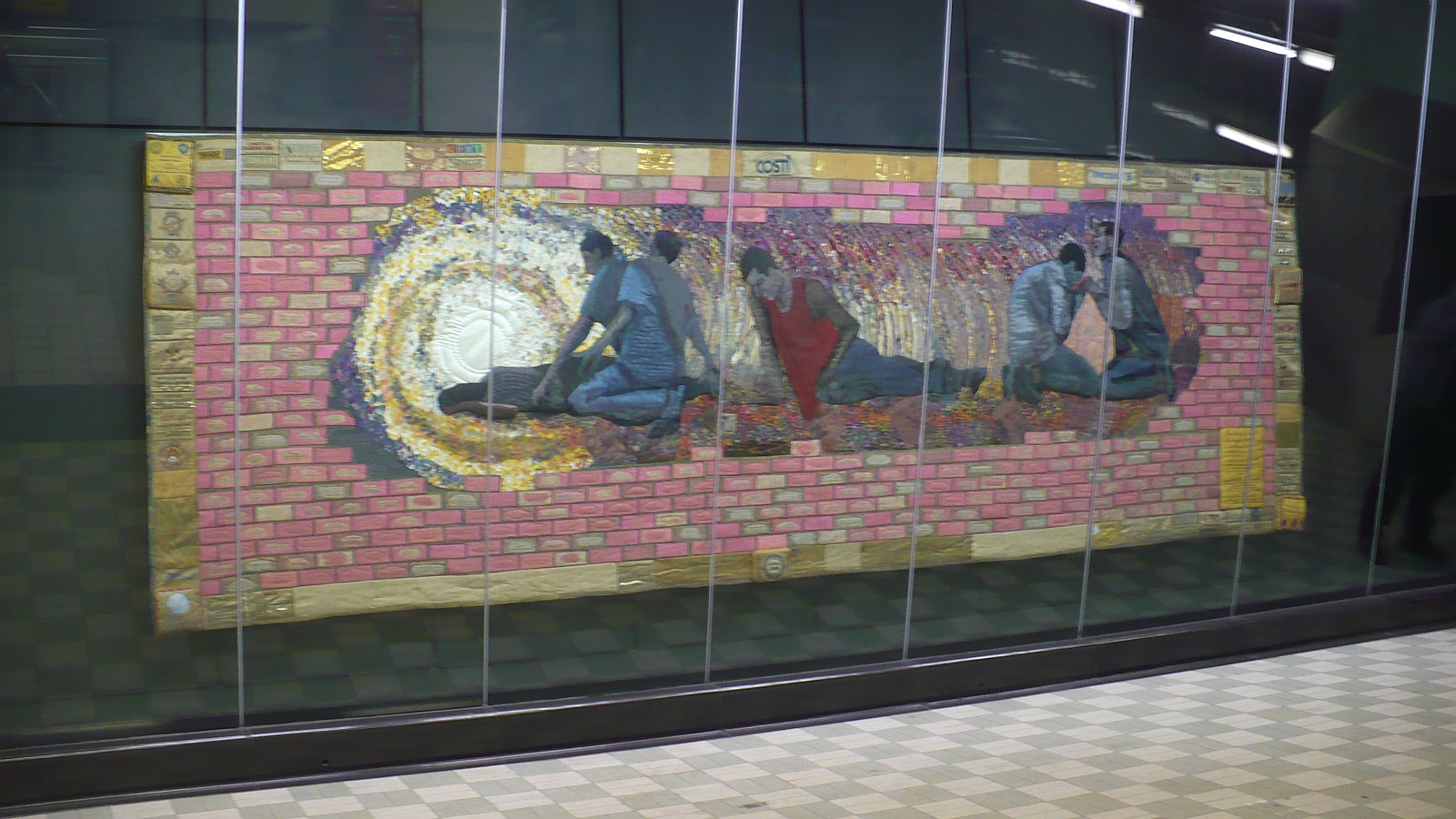
Breaking Ground

A tapestry called Breaking Ground by artist Laurie Swim was installed in the station in 2010 to commemorate the 50th anniversary of the Hoggs Hollow Disaster. This accident, which occurred on March 17, 1960, saw five Italian immigrant workers perish while constructing a tunnel for a water main. The details of their deaths sparked a public outcry over inadequate safety standards in construction and led to significant improvements in working conditions across Ontario.

== Subway infrastructure in the vicinity ==
The line passes under the Don River West Branch just south of the station platforms. The original plan was for an elevated station and a high-level bridge over the river, but local residents objected and the underground layout was substituted. Consequently, trains approach the station from both directions on a steep downgrade.

== Nearby landmarks ==
Nearby landmarks include York Mills Centre shopping mall, York Mills Park, Don Valley Golf Course, Loretto Abbey Catholic Secondary School, Canadian Forces College, Miller Tavern and Rosedale Golf Club

== Surface connections ==
TTC routes serving the station include:

Bay number	Route	Name	Additional information
1	996	Wilson Express	Westbound to Humberwood Boulevard via Wilson station and Humber College (Weekday service)
1	Wheel-Trans		
2	96A	Wilson	Westbound to Carrier Drive via Kipling Avenue and John Garland Boulevard
2	96B	Wilson	Westbound to Humberline Drive and Albion Road via Westhumber Boulevard and Martin Grove Road
2	96D	Wilson	Westbound to Carrier Drive and Westmore Drive
3	165	Weston Rd North	Westbound to Steeles Avenue West
4	Spare		
5	122	Graydon Hall	Eastbound to Roywood Drive via Lesmill Road
6	78	St. Andrews	Eastbound to Bayview Avenue
6	115	Silver Hills	Eastbound to Leslie Street
7	Spare		
8	95A	York Mills	Eastbound to Sheppard Avenue East and Port Union Road
8	95B	York Mills	Eastbound to U of T Scarborough
9	995	York Mills Express	Eastbound to U of T Scarborough (Weekday service)
9	996	Wilson Express	Eastbound to Scarborough Centre station (Weekday service)

Nearby TTC routes serving the station include:

Route	Name	Additional information
97A	Yonge	Northbound to Steeles Avenue and southbound to St. Clair station (On-street stop outside station)
97B	Yonge	Northbound to Steeles Avenue via Yonge Boulevard and southbound to St. Clair station via Yonge Boulevard (On-street stop outside station)
320	Yonge	Blue Night service; northbound to Steeles Avenue and southbound to Queens Quay (On-street stop outside station)
395	York Mills	Blue Night service; eastbound to Meadowvale Road and Sheppard Avenue East (On-street stop outside station)
396	Wilson	Blue Night service; westbound to Martin Grove Road and Steeles Avenue West (On-street stop outside station)
