= York Mills Bus Terminal =

Bus terminal in Toronto, Canada

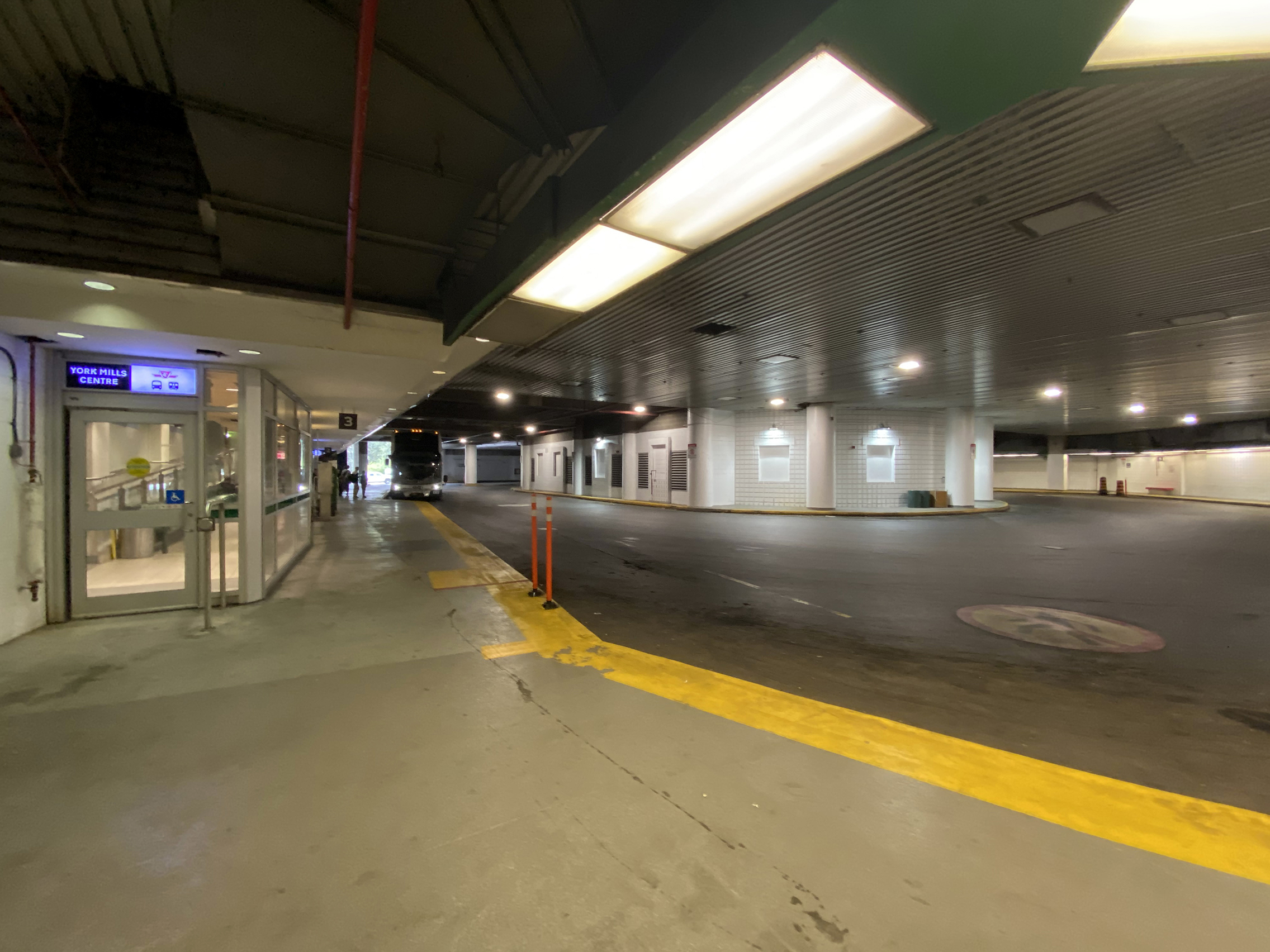

General information
- Location: 4023 Yonge Street; Toronto, Ontario; Canada
- Coordinates: 43°44′42″N 79°24′23″W
- Owner: City of Toronto
- Bus operators: GO Transit
- Connections: at York Mills

Construction
- Parking: No free parking

Other information
- Station code: GO Transit: 00011

History
- Rebuilt: 1992; 34 years ago
Location

York Mills GO Bus Terminal is located at 4023 Yonge Street, near the northeast corner of York Mills Road, in the North York area of Toronto, Ontario, Canada. The terminal mainly supports GO Transit's bus services east and west across the Highway 401 corridor and is adjacent to York Mills station on Line 1 Yonge–University of the Toronto subway.

== Location ==
The bus station is on the ground floor of York Mills Centre, Building 4, constructed by York-Trillium Development Group Limited in 1992. This space is part of the upper level of York Mills subway station and leased from the Toronto Transit Commission/City of Toronto, but is separate and distinct from the TTC facility that it is connected to. There is a height restriction that prevented use of GO Transit's original fleet of double-decker buses on routes that serve York Mills Terminal until 'Super-Lo' models became available.

== History ==
The area is part of historic Hoggs Hollow where the first settler arrived in 1794. Originally it was called York Mills Village due to the development of the area around three mills. At the beginning of the 20th century, the valley began to develop a more residential nature. Surrounded by tall trees, steep hills and parkland, Hoggs Hollow has become one of Toronto's prime residential areas, with a little more commercial development in recent years.

== GO Transit bus routes ==
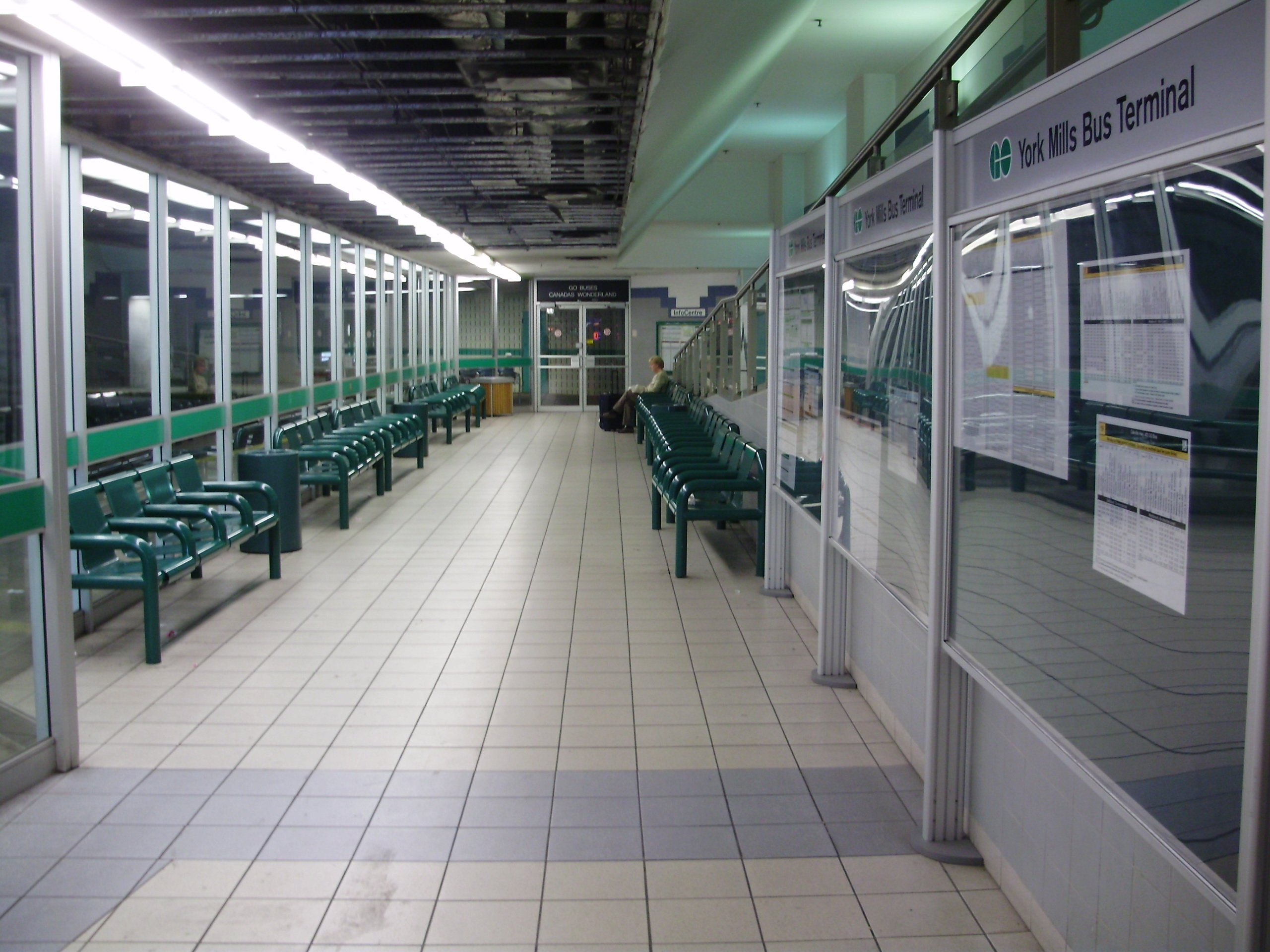
Passenger waiting area before renovation

- 32 Brampton Hwy. 407 Service
- 33 Guelph Hwy. 410 Service
- 36 Brampton via Hwy. 427 Express
- 92 Oshawa/Yorkdale Service

== See also ==
- York Mills (TTC)
- GO Transit
