= Teresa Ellen Dease =

Irish Roman Catholic nun

Mother Teresa Ellen Dease

Personal life
- Born: Ellen Dease; 4 May 1820 Naas, County Kildare, Ireland
- Died: 1 July 1889 (aged 69) Toronto, Ontario, Canada

Religious life
- Religion: Catholic
- Order: Loreto Sisters

Teresa Ellen Dease (4 May 1820 – 1 July 1889) was a Roman Catholic nun and the foundress of the Loreto Sisters (Institute of the Blessed Virgin Mary in Canada and in North America. She arrived in Toronto in 1847 at the invitation of Bishop Michael Power.

== Life ==
Ellen Dease was born in Naas, County Kildare, Ireland, the youngest of five children born to Oliver and Anne Nugent Dease. Her father was a surgeon at Westmoreland Lock Hospital. Orphaned at a young age, she was raised by her maternal grandmother in Dublin, where she attended a school for young ladies. She continued her education in Paris, where she became fluent in French and Italian, and an accomplished musician. Returning to Dublin, she took part in the social life of the city. Her oldest sister Anna entered the Sisters of Loreto and became superior of the convent at Fermoy; her sister Bridget lived with community as a lay person.

At the age of twenty-five, Dease entered Loretto Abbey in Rathfarnham, taking the name Teresa. In January 1847 Bishop Michael Power of Toronto went on a six-month visit to Europe, seeking to recruit additional priests and to raise money for his cathedral. While in Ireland he arranged for the Sisters of Loreto to establish a mission in Toronto. Dease was asked if she would take part.

== Canada ==
Dease professed her vows on 3 August 1847 and two days later set out for Canada with four other sisters. They arrived in Toronto 16 September 1847 in the midst of a typhus epidemic. Power contracted the illness while tending the sick and died 1 October. The sisters rented a house on Duke Street and began to give lessons in languages and music. The following year, they moved to a larger house and began a boarding school. Income from the boarder and day students helped to finance a free school for the poor of the cathedral parish. Power's successor, Armand-François-Marie de Charbonnel wrote:

This good ladies have suffered more than I can say. Deprived of a bishop, a house and of many things these three years, I am amazed at their having got through the numberless difficulties they contend with...they are esteemed and cherished by their pupils...Reverend Mother is very delicate; Sister Gertrude keeps to her bed; one has died; in fact they are overwhelmed.

Unused to Canadian winters, Sister Gertrude (Mary) Fleming had had a foot amputated due to frostbite; the founding superior, Mother Ignatius Hutchinson died. Within four years of arrival, Dease was the only member of the initial group still alive in Canada. In March 1851, Dease was named superior. She wrote Mother Frances Ball suggesting that the mission be closed and they return home. Mother Francis directed them to stay. A few sisters arrived from Ireland and more homegrown vocations developed. By 1859, thirty-one members had joined the community. Dease twice returned to Ireland to visit family and recruit more sisters.

As superior, she oversaw the work of the sisters in both the publicly funded separate schools and private convent schools. Dease's ability to work with separate schools boards allowed the growth of publicly funded Catholic education in the province and the expansion of the order across North America. Thirteen establishments opened under her watch, including Loretto Abbey Catholic Secondary School in Toronto (named after their previous home of Loreto Abbey near Dublin), and the first in the United States in Joliet, Illinois. Although initially reluctant, she changed the curriculum to align with that of the provincial schools to better prepare the students for professional careers. To ensure the sisters were fully qualified to teach, by 1870 they began to attend Normal School.

In 1881, the Vatican made the North American branch of the Institute a separate generalate and Mother Dease became its first Superior General.

Dease is buried at the former Loretto convent in Niagara Falls, Ontario.
