= York Mills Centre =

Commercial complex in Toronto, Canada

Coordinates: 43.744919°N 79.405843°W

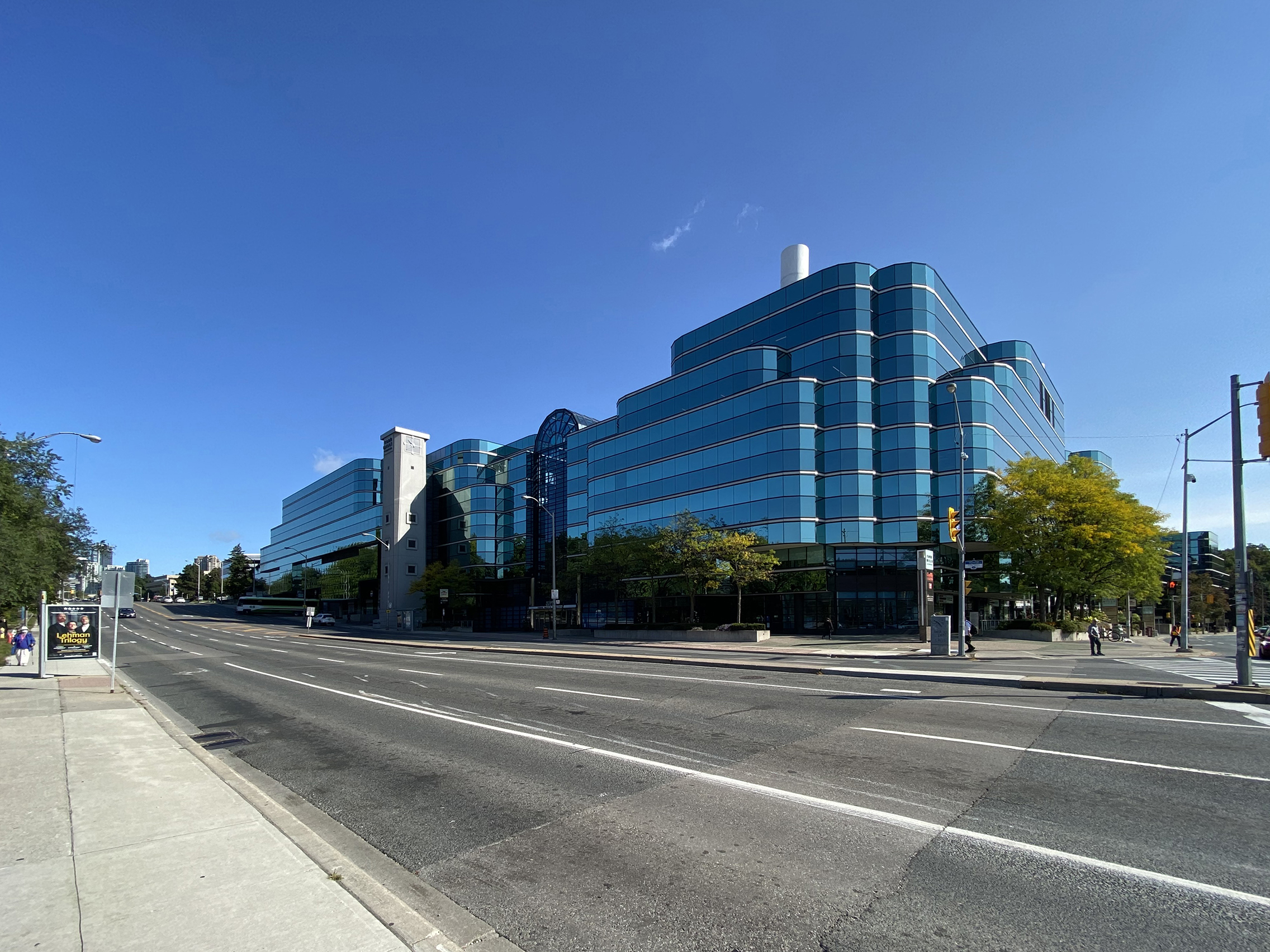
The western facade of the York Mills Centre

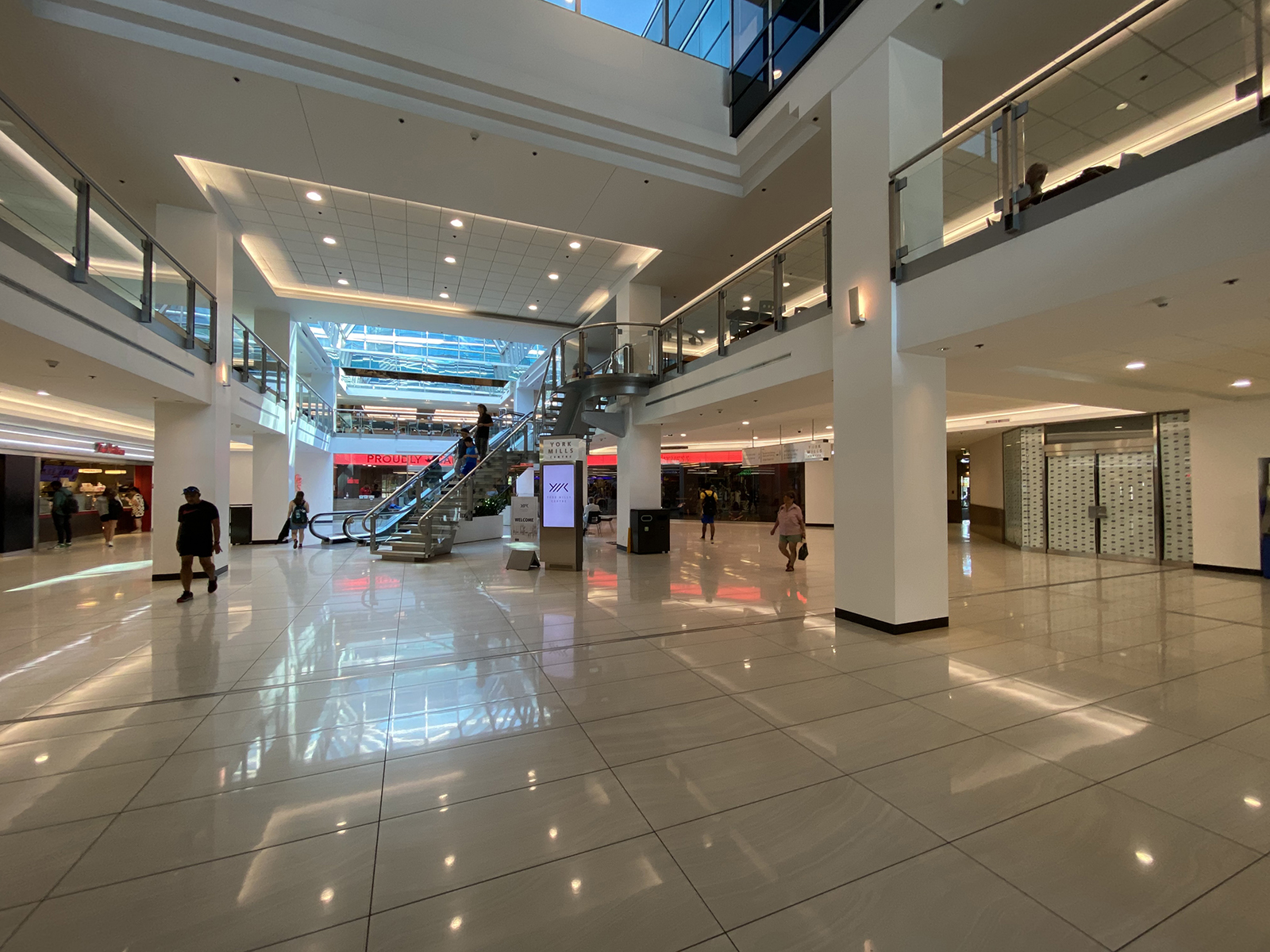
Atrium

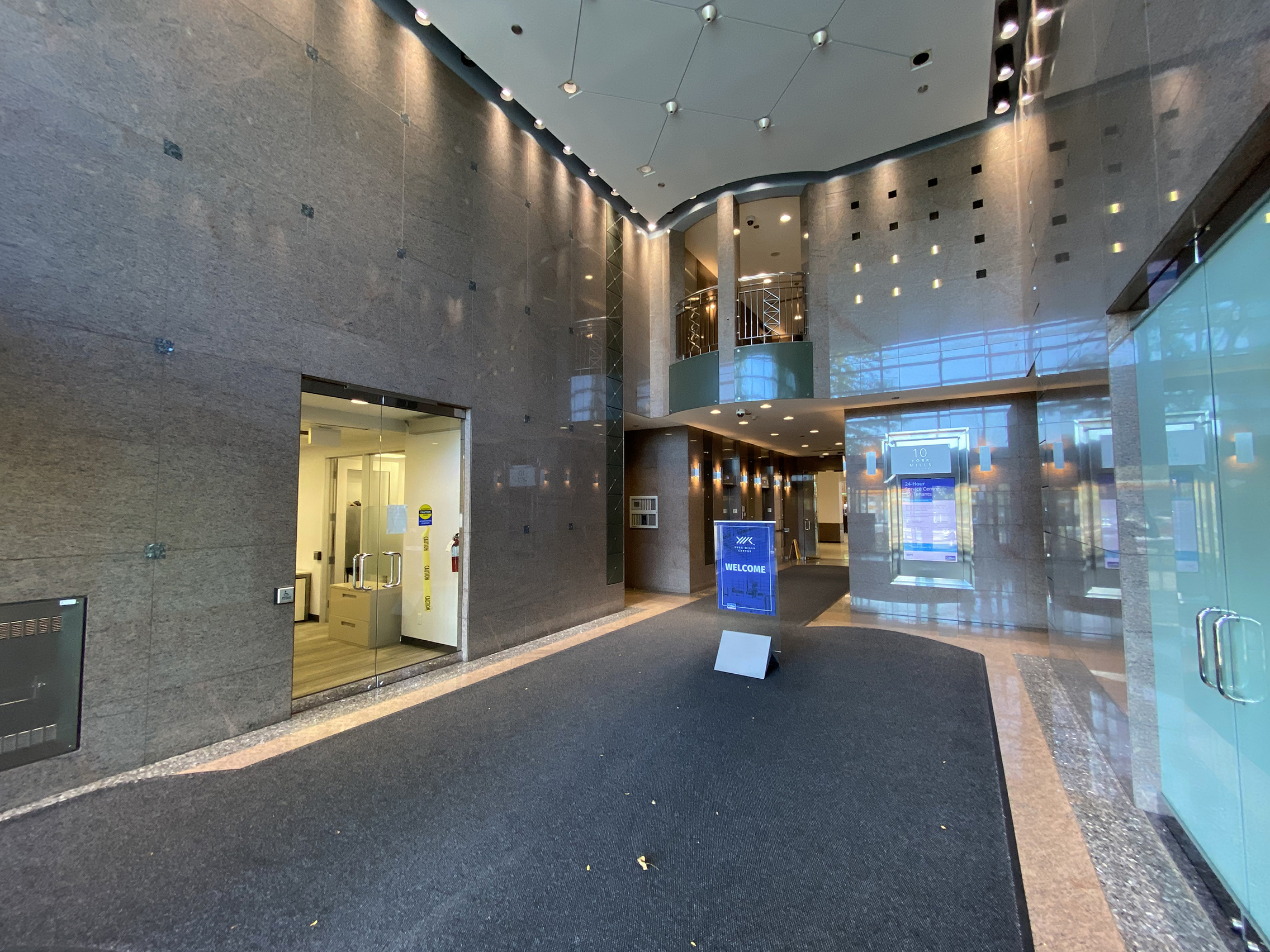
Office lobby

York Mills Centre is a four-phase commercial complex at Yonge Street and York Mills Road in Toronto, Ontario, Canada. York Mills Centre's location is adjacent to the interchange of Highway 401. The centre consists of low-rise towers and many amenities, convenient retail and dining under a glass-topped atrium. The York Mills Centre site is part of the historic Hogg's Hollow. It is connected to urban and regional transit through the York Mills TTC station and York Mills Bus Terminal of GO Transit. The Complex was built by the York Trillium Development Group. The property is currently managed by Manulife Financial, which acquired it for C$161 million from Ivanhoé Cambridge in a deal that closed December 12, 2011.

The campus is a 549,000-square-foot, four-building office complex that features raised floors throughout, two internal bus stations, and is directly above the York Mills Subway Station. Including parking and the purpose built bus terminals, the complex is approximately 1.5 million square feet.

== History ==
Building 1, built in 1986, is a 5 floor building with 91,262 sq ft (8,478.5 m^{2}) space. This Phase I building was leased to Suncor in 1987, and it remains their corporate headquarters. Building 2, built in 1986 is a 5 floor building with 133,585 sq ft (12,410.5 m^{2}) of space. Building 3, built in 1989, is a 7 floor building with 195,256 sq ft (18,139.9 m^{2}) of space. Building 4, built in 1990, is a 4 floor building with 119,040 sq ft (11,059 m^{2}) of space.
