= Miller Tavern =

Restaurant in Toronto, Ontario, Canada

Coordinates: 43.740755°N 79.405725°W

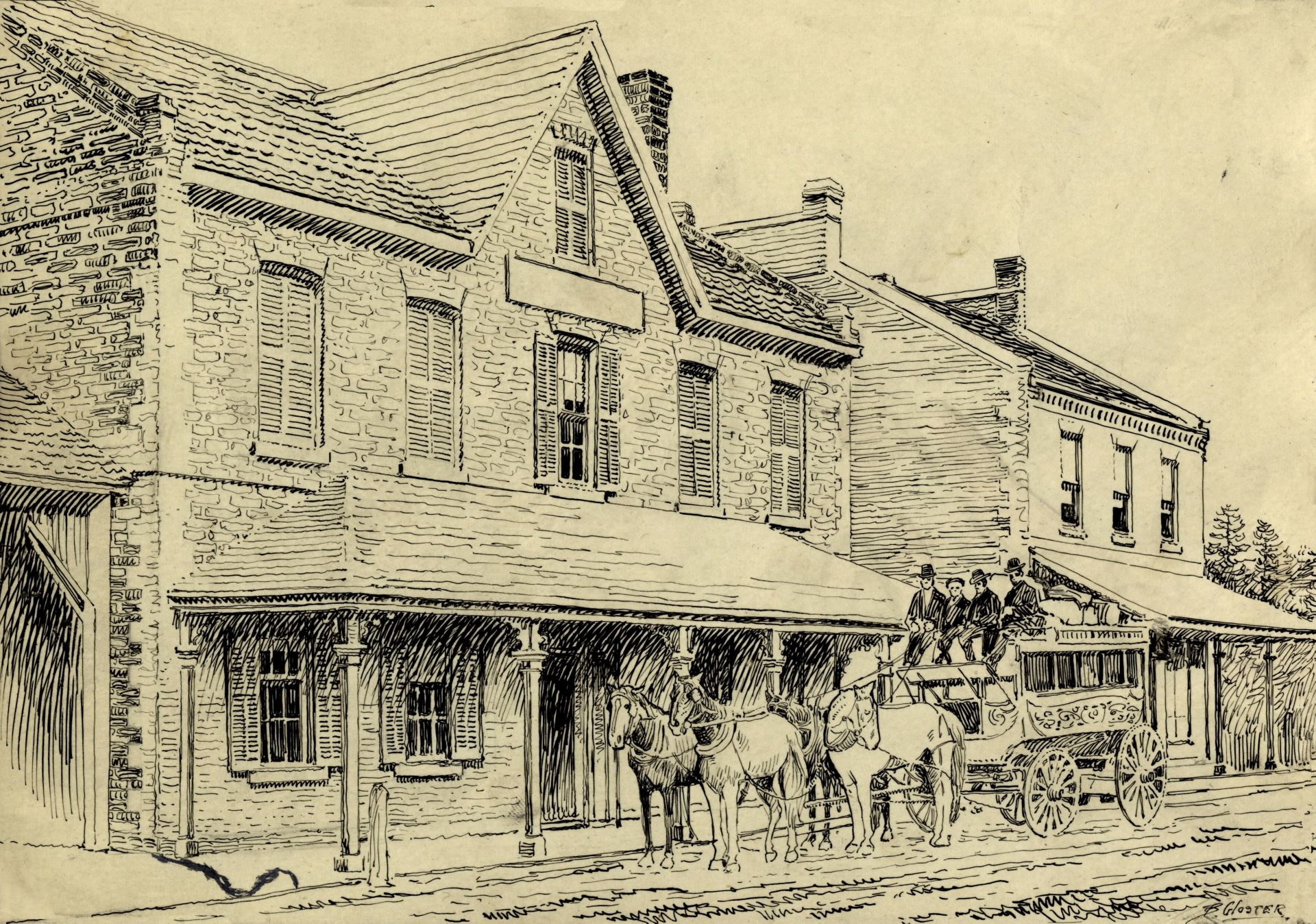
Illustration of the building, c. 1915

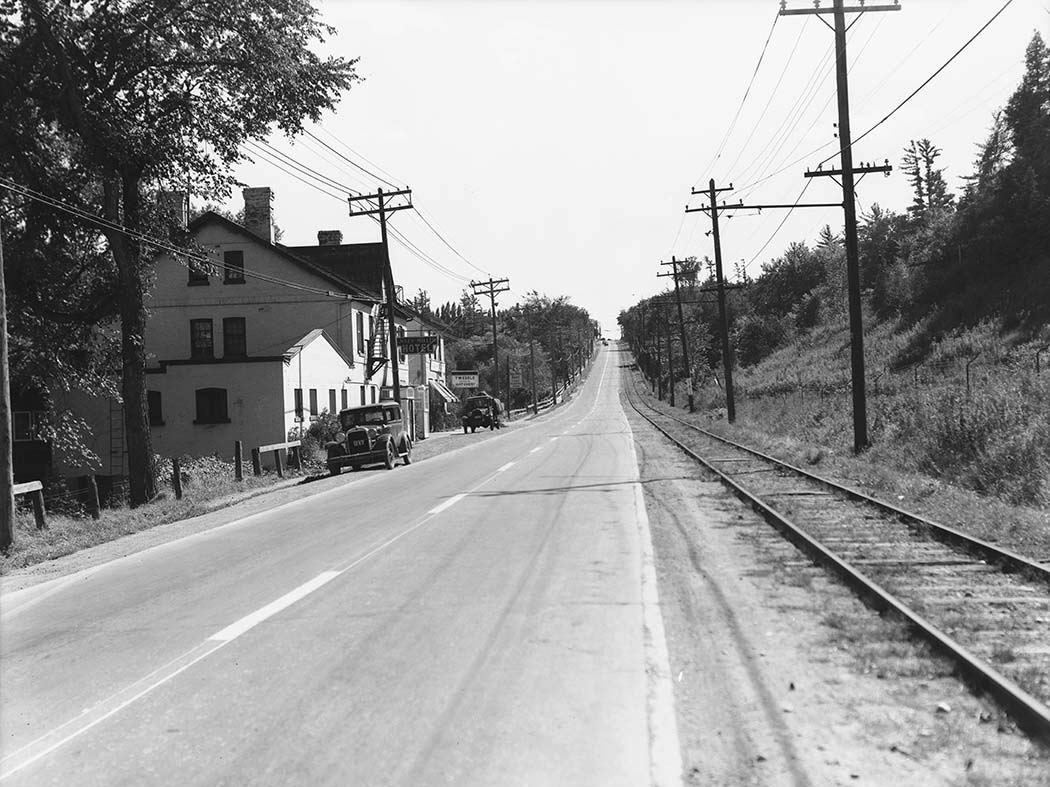
Looking south along Yonge Street toward the Jolly Miller, c. 1936

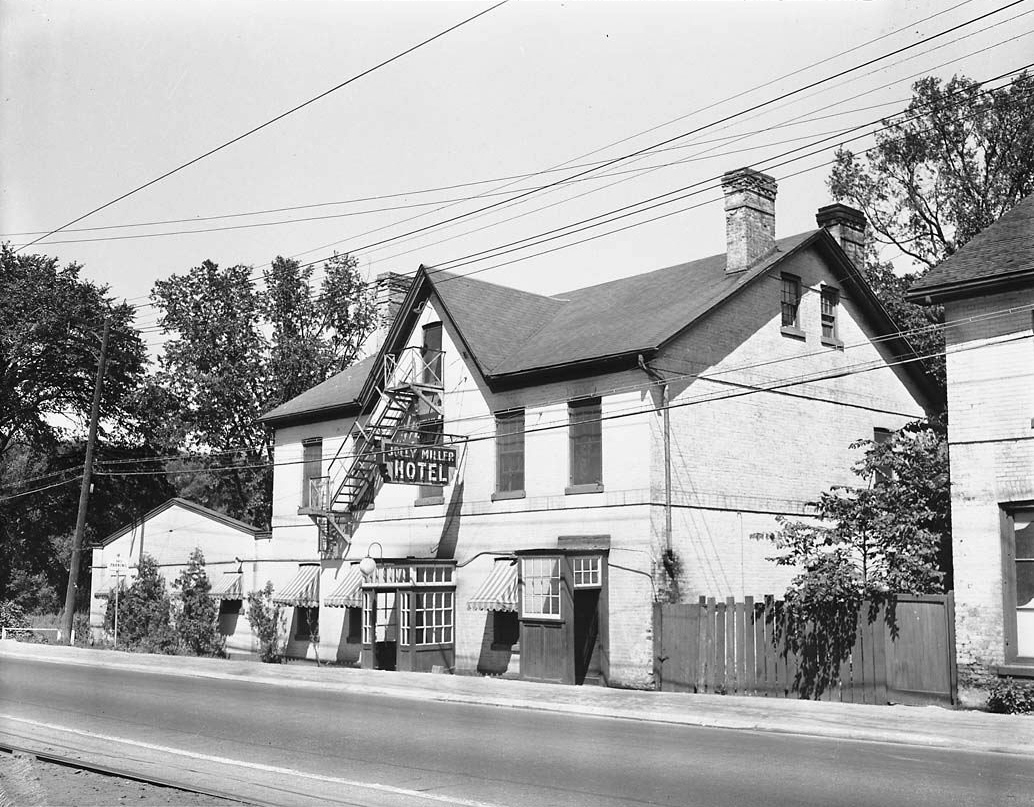
The Jolly Miller in 1945

The Miller Tavern is a restaurant located in a historic building at 3885 Yonge Street in Toronto, Ontario, south of York Mills Road in the York Mills neighbourhood. Originally called the York Mills Hotel and later named the Jolly Miller, the building dates from the 1850s. A second location is situated in the Pinnnacle Centre on Toronto's waterfront.

== History ==
Early in the 19th century, a tavern keeper here named Vallière was offering food and shelter to soldiers returning from the battle area during the War of 1812. His was one of many taverns that for years lined what was little more than a muddy trail leading north from the Town of York. In fact, Yonge Street boasted more taverns than any other road in the province. There were drinking establishments, on one side or another, every half-mile between Toronto and Lake Simcoe.

The York Mills Hotel, known today as the Miller Tavern, was a hotel built circa 1857 to replace an earlier establishment which was destroyed by fire. The new hotel was constructed by John and William Hogg, who had developed the Hoggs Hollow subdivision on their York Mills property in 1856. A barn to house horses was located on the north side of the building. The York Mills Hotel was a focal point for the mill village, and a stopping place for the mail stage and omnibus between Toronto and Richmond Hill.

During Prohibition in the 20th century, the building housed a gambling den that was eventually closed down following several police raids. In 1930, the old hotel was remodelled with the intent of creating a prestigious dining establishment. It was renamed the Jolly Miller after a local mill owner. The sign board depicting a 'jolly miller' was painted by noted Canadian artist Charles William Jefferys.

In more recent times, the building continued to function as a hotel and tavern, offering accommodation until about 1964. A skating rink (York Mills Skating Rink) was built on the flats behind the building, with a change room provided in the neighbouring two-storey Hogg General Store (a brick building destroyed by fire in 1978). The hotel was later renovated and turned into a seafood restaurant, and it was renamed with the current name.

== Architecture ==
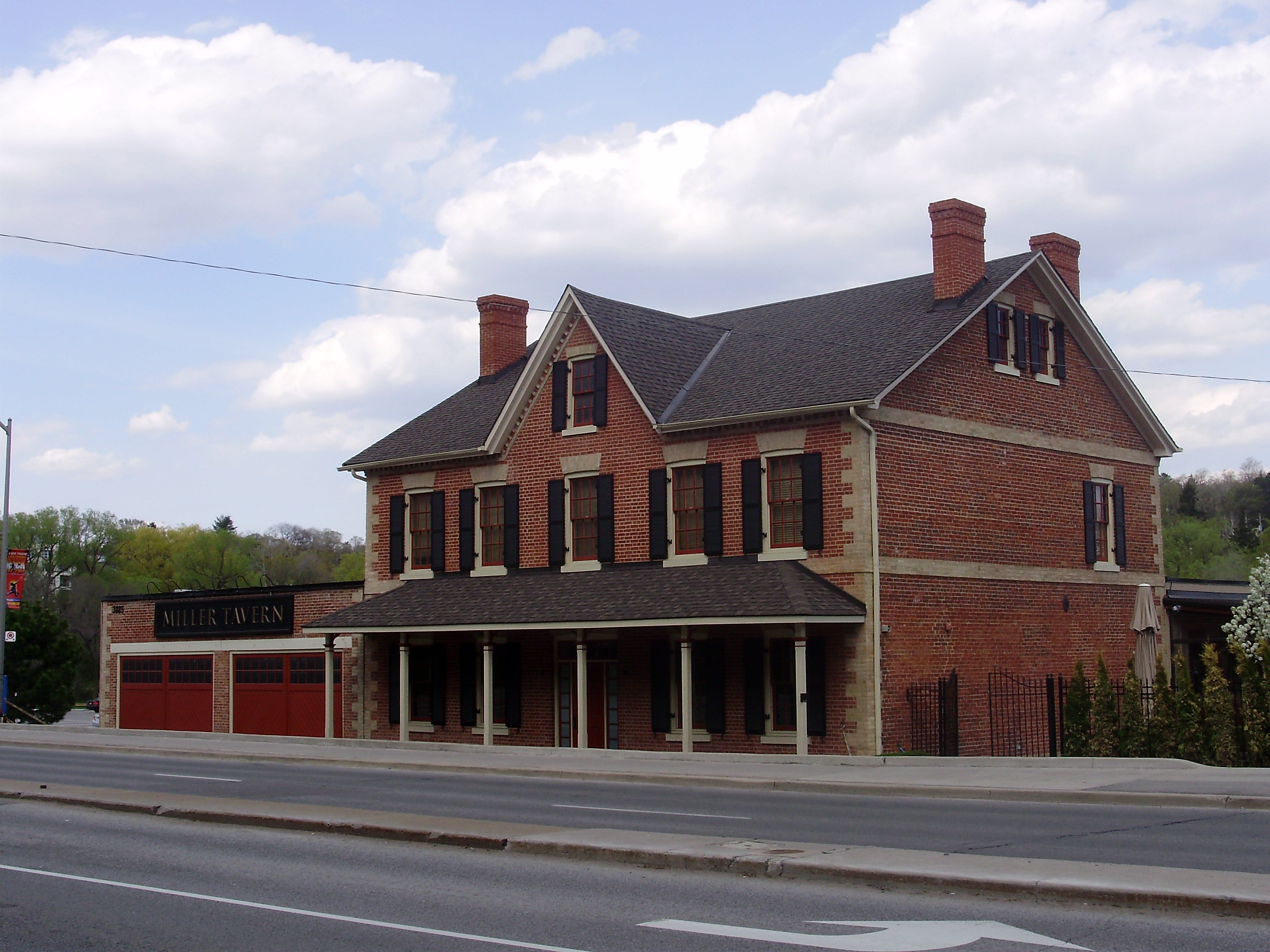
The Miller Tavern in 2009

The building evokes the Georgian Revival style of many 19th-century buildings in Ontario. Constructed of red brick, laid in a common bond pattern, it measures 2½ storeys high and is based on a rectangular plan. It features a high-pitched gabled roof with boxed eaves. Generous amounts of wall space in relation to the size of the windows can be noted on most elevations. Elements such as the plinth, belt courses, quoins, jack arches and ornate pendant frieze (east elevation) are highlighted in buff-coloured brick. The south wall is intact, as are the north, east and west walls above the ground floor level. The historic portion of the building has a rubblestone foundation that provides a basement under the west half of the building.

The symmetrical, 5-ranked front facade has a steep, centred cross-gable, containing a 6-over-6 sash window. The four corbelled chimneys at the gable-ends are restored versions of the originals. At one time, a hip-roofed veranda supported by several posts spanned across the entire front elevation.

The much-altered interior originally had a centre-hall plan. Vestiges of two fireplaces are thought to remain within broad projections on the south wall. Original interior elements of the building that also remain intact include mouldings, trims and doors located in the attic storey.
