= Hoggs Hollow Disaster =

5 Italian Immigrant workers were killed in a tunnel in Toronto 1960

Coordinates: 43.7429°N 79.4064°W

- Date: March 17, 1960
- Time: 18:00 (Eastern Time Zone)
- Location: Hoggs Hollow, North York, Toronto, Ontario, Canada
- Type: Construction accident, fire
- Cause: Welding spark ignited flammable materials
- Deaths: 5

The Hoggs Hollow disaster was a construction accident that occurred on March 17, 1960 in Toronto, Ontario, Canada. The incident resulted in the deaths of five Italian immigrant workers who were constructing a water main tunnel beneath the Don River in the Hogg's Hollow neighbourhood. The workers, known as "sandhogs", were trapped underground when a fire broke out in the tunnel, leading to a series of catastrophic events including flooding and cave-ins. The disaster exposed the hazardous working conditions faced by many immigrant labourers in the construction industry and became a catalyst for significant reforms in Ontario's labour laws and safety regulations.

The victims were all recent immigrants from Italy, reflecting the wave of Italian immigration to Canada in the post-World War II era. Their deaths sparked public outrage and led to increased scrutiny of workplace safety practices, particularly in the construction sector. The tragedy prompted a coroner's inquest, a royal commission, and ultimately resulted in the most comprehensive overhaul of Ontario's labour laws in nearly four decades.

The Hogg's Hollow disaster is remembered as a pivotal moment in Canadian labour history, marking a turning point in the treatment of immigrant workers and the enforcement of workplace safety standards. It led to the strengthening of unions, particularly among Italian-Canadian workers, and continues to be commemorated through memorials, including a plaque at the site and a commemorative quilt displayed at York Mills station of the Toronto subway's Line 1 Yonge–University.

== Background ==
Hogg's Hollow is a neighbourhood in the North York district of Toronto, Ontario, Canada. The area was first settled in the early 19th century and was named after James Hogg, a Scottish immigrant who operated a whisky distillery and gristmill along the Don River. By the mid-20th century, Hogg's Hollow had become a prime location for residential development as Toronto experienced a post-war construction boom.

During this period, Canada also saw a significant wave of Italian immigration, with many Italians settling in Toronto and finding work in the construction industry. These immigrants often faced language barriers, discrimination, and exploitation in the workplace, with many taking on dangerous jobs for low pay.

In 1960, Toronto was in the midst of a major infrastructure expansion. The Hogg's Hollow project involved the construction of a water main tunnel beneath the Don River, connecting to a pumping station on the other side. The tunnel was approximately 10 meters (35 feet) underground and had a diameter of about 2 meters (6 feet).

== The disaster ==
On 17 March 1960, a crew of Italian immigrant workers were completing their shift in the tunnel project beneath the Don River in Hogg's Hollow. The project had been plagued by delays and financial issues, leading to pressure to complete the work quickly.

At approximately 6:00 p.m., a fire broke out in the tunnel, likely caused by a spark from a welding torch igniting flammable materials. The flames quickly spread, trapping five men underground. The fire caused the tunnel to fill with thick smoke, and the situation was exacerbated when rescue workers mistakenly shut off the air compressors that were maintaining pressure in the tunnel.

This decision caused parts of the tunnel to collapse and allowed water and silt from the Don River to seep in. Rescue attempts were further hampered by the intense heat, lack of oxygen, and rising water levels as firefighters poured water into the tunnel to extinguish the blaze.

The trapped workers had no safety equipment, no proper ventilation, and no means of communication with those above ground. Despite heroic efforts by rescuers, including fellow workers who volunteered to enter the dangerous tunnel, only one man was brought out alive in the initial hours after the fire started.

It took nearly five days for rescuers to recover the bodies of all five victims. The official cause of death was listed as a combination of carbon monoxide poisoning and drowning.

== The victims ==
The five men who lost their lives in the Hogg's Hollow disaster were:

- Pasquale Allegrezza, 28
- Giovanni Carriglio, 40
- Giovanni Fusillo, 29
- Alessandro Mantella, 25
- Guido Mantella, 23

All five men had immigrated to Canada from Italy. They were working on the tunnel project as "sandhogs," a term used for workers who specialize in underground construction.

== Investigation and inquest ==
In the aftermath of the disaster, a coroner's inquest was launched to investigate the circumstances surrounding the men's deaths. The inquest revealed numerous safety failures and a lack of proper regulations in the construction industry. Witnesses testified that the tunnel lacked adequate ventilation, lighting, and emergency equipment, and that the workers had not received proper safety training.

The inquest jury ruled that the deaths were "the inevitable result of the failure to implement and enforce regulations." and cited "the callous attitude of management towards workers' safety." The verdict sparked public outrage and led to calls for sweeping reforms in workplace safety laws.

The investigation highlighted the exploitation faced by many immigrant workers in the construction industry, particularly those from Italy who often lacked English language skills and were unfamiliar with their rights. It also exposed the inadequate government oversight of construction projects and the lack of emergency response protocols for underground accidents.

The findings of the inquest would prove to be a catalyst for significant changes in Ontario's labour laws and safety regulations.

== Impact and legacy ==
The Hogg's Hollow disaster was a watershed moment in Canadian labour history, exposing the dangerous conditions and exploitation faced by immigrant workers in the construction industry. In response to the tragedy and the public outcry that followed, the Ontario government established the Royal Commission on Industrial Safety, led by James McAndrew.

The commission's report, released in 1961, called for major changes to the province's labour laws and safety regulations, including stricter enforcement, better training for workers, and harsher penalties for employers who violated safety standards. The disaster forced Ontario to modernize its labour codes, safety regulations, and compensation laws. In the aftermath, all aspects of labour law were re-examined, with a particular focus on health and safety standards. This culminated in Ontario's new Industrial Safety Act. Later in the 1960s, this Act became the foundation for the Canada Labour (Safety) Code. As a consequence, Ontario today has some of the lowest construction accident rates in North America.

The disaster also sparked a wave of unionization among Italian-Canadian construction workers, who fought for better working conditions, fair wages, and job security. Organizations like the Italian Immigrant Aid Society and the Brandon Union Group played key roles in mobilizing workers and advocating for change.

== Memorials and commemorations ==
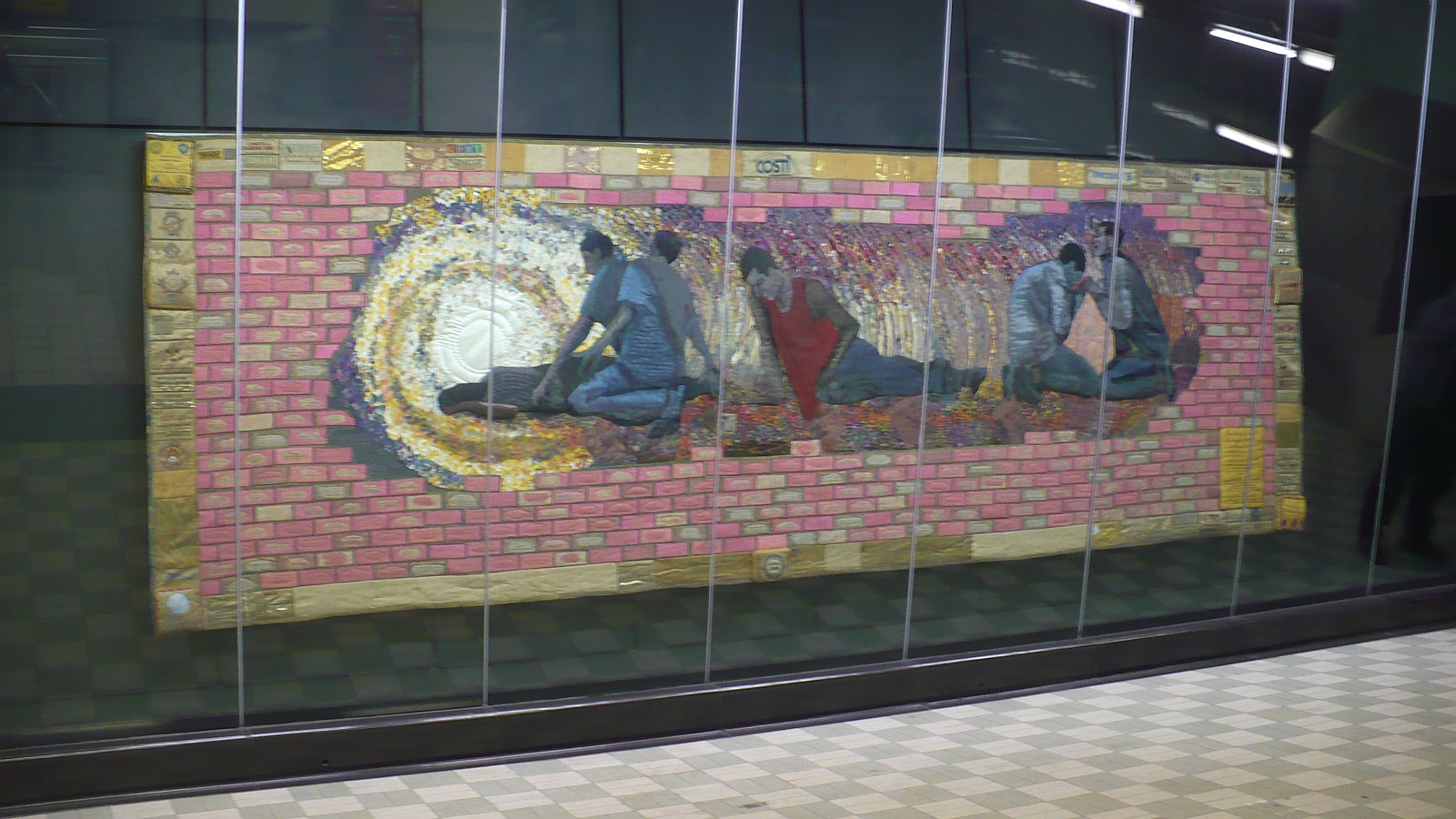
Breaking Ground quilt

Several memorials have been created to honour the victims of the Hogg's Hollow disaster and to raise awareness about the importance of workplace safety. In 2000, a plaque was unveiled at the site of the accident, commemorating the 40th anniversary of the tragedy.

Artist Laurie Swim created a large commemorative quilt titled "Breaking Ground: The Hogg's Hollow Disaster, 1960" which depicts the five men and the tunnel where they lost their lives. The quilt is on permanent display at the York Mills subway station in Toronto.

The Hogg's Hollow disaster is also remembered as part of the Italian Fallen Workers Memorial project, which honours Italian-Canadian workers who died on the job. The project includes a memorial wall at the Villa Charities campus in Toronto and an online database of workers' stories.

== In popular culture ==
The Hogg's Hollow disaster has been the subject of several books, articles, and creative works over the years. In 2000, journalist Enzo Di Matteo wrote an article for Now Toronto titled "Hidden Toronto: The Hogg's Hollow disaster," which explored the history and legacy of the tragedy.

Folk singer Smokey Dymny wrote and recorded a song called "The Hogg's Hollow Disaster" in 2000, telling the story of the five men and the impact of their deaths on the Italian-Canadian community.

The disaster was also mentioned in the 2019 book "The Italians Who Built Toronto" by Stefano Agnoletto, which examines the contributions and struggles of Italian immigrants in the city's construction industry.
