= Hoggs Hollow =

Coordinates: 43.739°N 79.400°W

- Neighbourhood
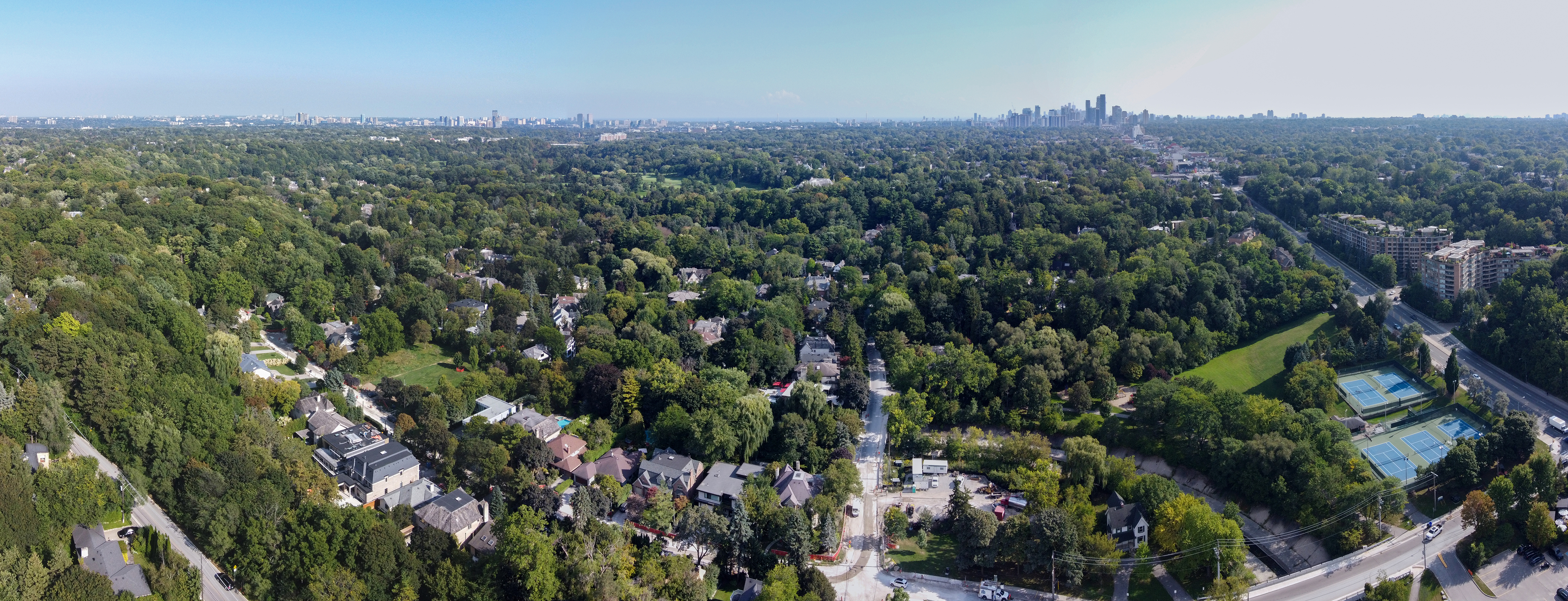
- Aerial view of Hoggs Hollow in 2024

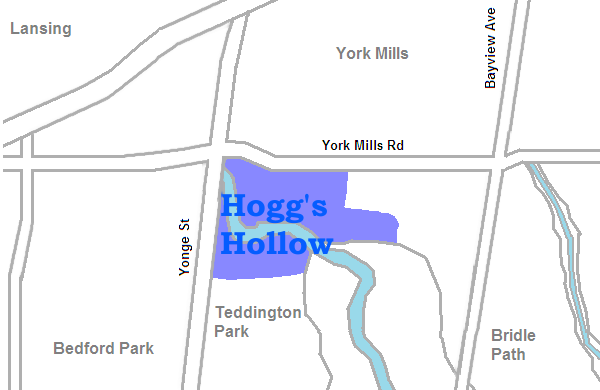
- Country: Canada
- Province: Ontario
- City: Toronto
- Municipality established: 1850 York Township
- Changed municipality: 1922: North York from York Township
- Changed municipality: 1998: Toronto from North York

Hoggs Hollow is a residential neighbourhood in Toronto, Ontario, Canada. It is located to the south of York Mills Road, east of Yonge Street, and the western branch of the upper Don River flows through it.

Hoggs Hollow is named after the Hogg family. James Hogg (1797–1839), a Scotsman, settled in the area in 1824. He operated a whisky distillery and a grist mill, and he was viewed as the most successful of all the millers in the valley. The name of the neighbourhood is usually written without an apostrophe as Hoggs Hollow, but it sometimes appears with an apostrophe as Hogg's Hollow.

== History ==
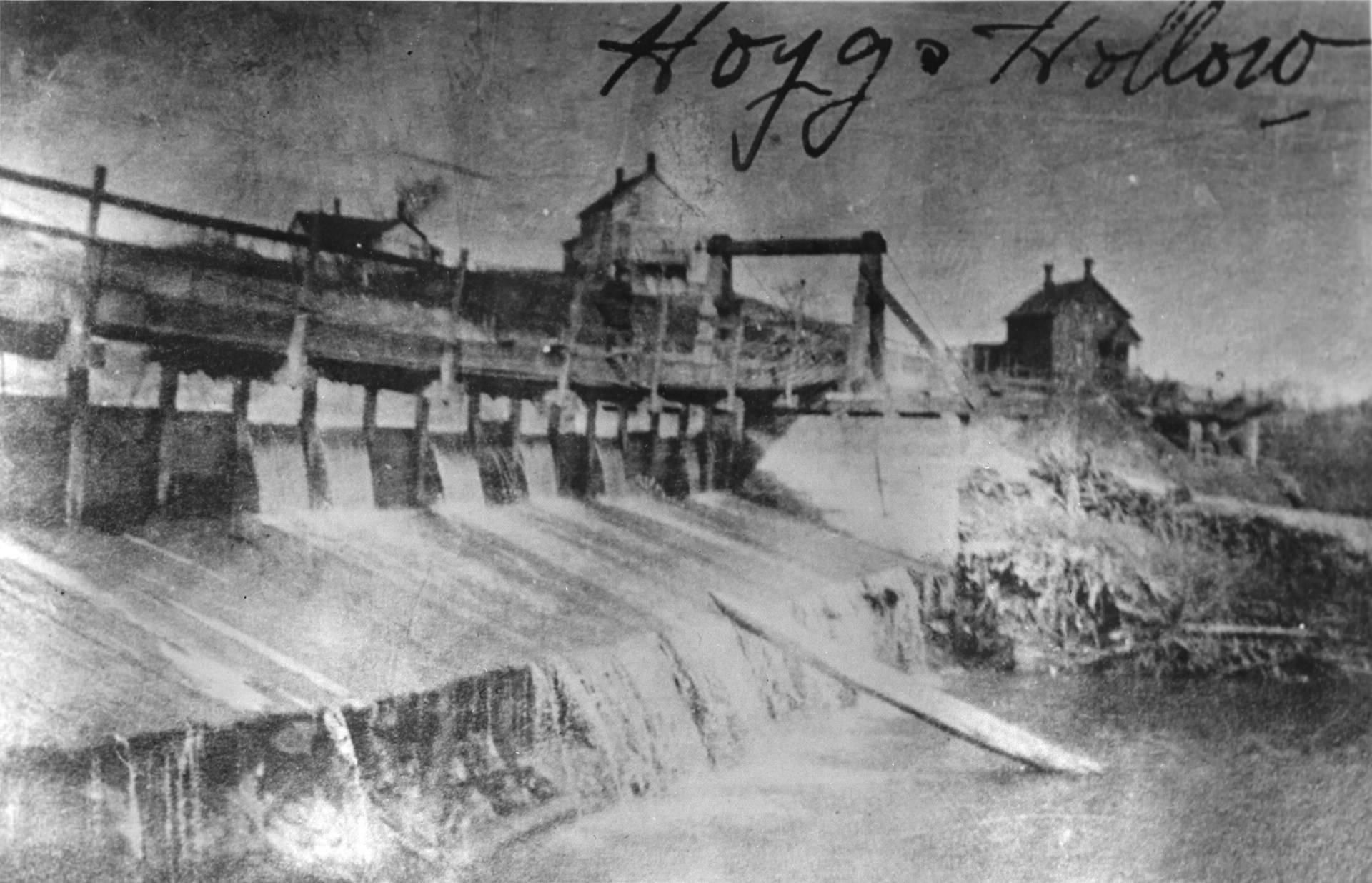
Dam on the Don River at Hogg's Hollow, 1900

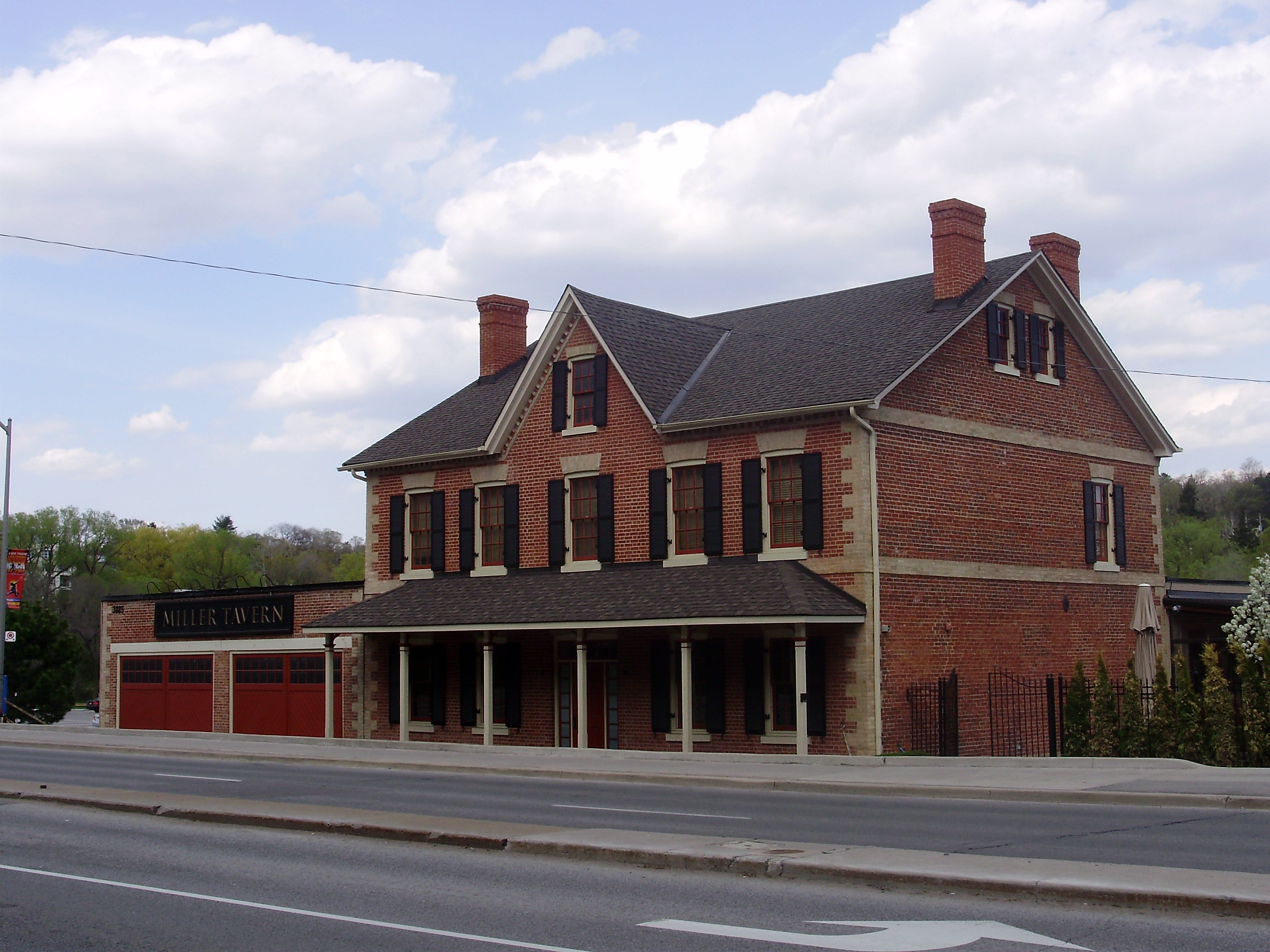
The Miller Tavern in Hoggs Hollow

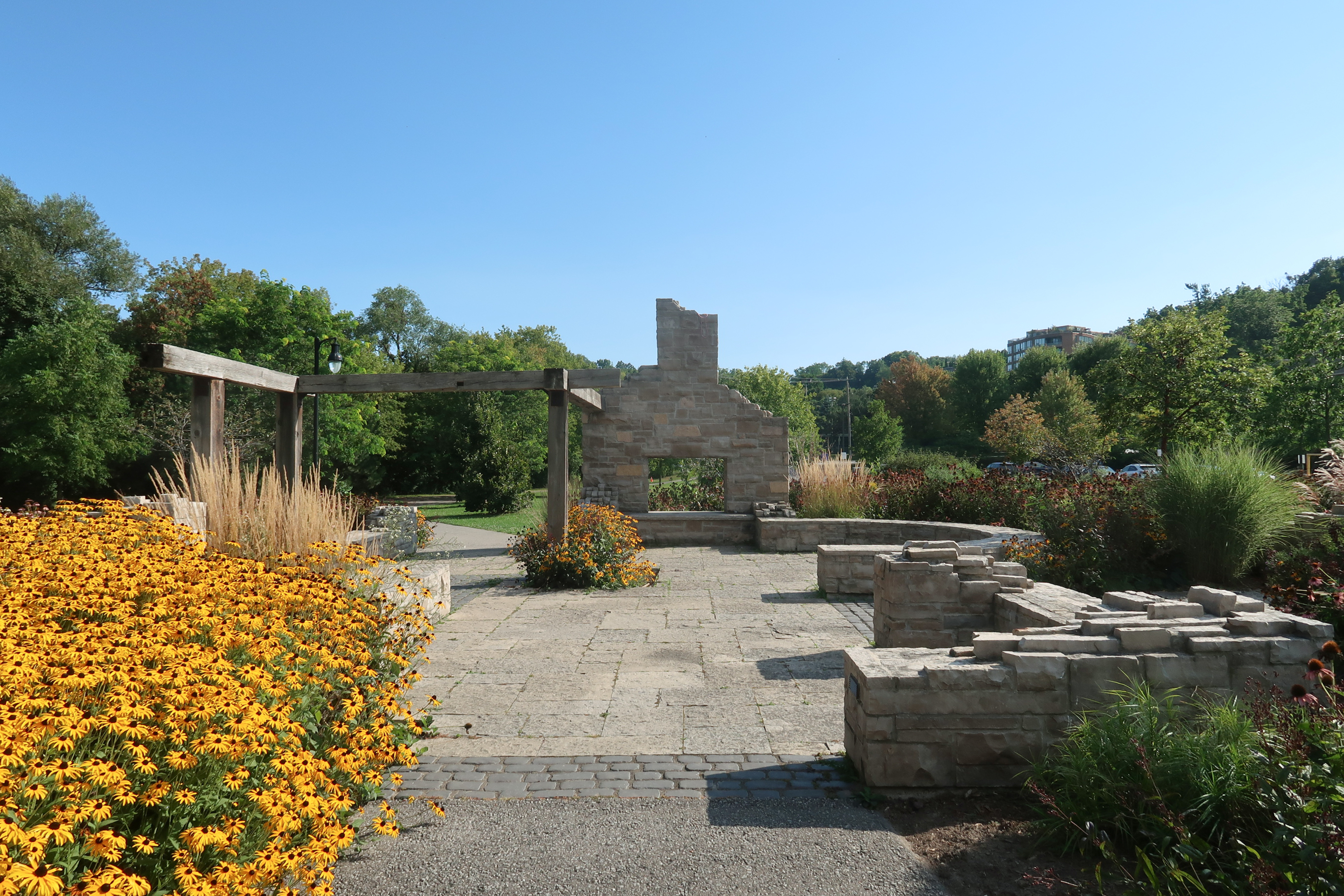
Jolly Miller Park

In 1856, John and William Hogg, sons of James Hogg, subdivided their father's estate under the name "Hoggs Hollow". The subdivision included one hundred and forty-one lots. With the area full of quick sand, swamps and bogs, only a few houses were actually built at this time, however Sebastian and Carson were among the first settlers to arrive in Hoggs Hollow with the Hogg family. The subdivision stood in close proximity to the historic village of York Mills. A school, post office, pottery, blacksmith, livery, stable, store, golf links and clubhouse, hillside cemetery (at Yonge Street and Mill Street) and St. John's Anglican Church served the community, one largely made up of Scottish, Irish and English immigrants.

In 1805 Cornelius van Nostrand and his large family settled in this area to farm. He was the first Canadian van Nostrand and played a significant role in the building of the nearby St. John's Anglican Church, where a large family monument is situated. The family went on to operate a grist mill and distillery.

Development of the present-day Hoggs Hollow neighbourhood began during the 1920s with the creation of lots, layout of roads, and design of homes reflecting the aesthetic of the English countryside. In 1925, a two-room elementary schoolhouse named the Baron Renfrew School opened to replace an earlier structure at 45 York Mills Road (formerly Mercer Avenue and/or concession road 19) that was destroyed by fire. In 1929, the Loretto Sisters Institute of the Blessed Virgin Mary moved their Motherhouse and Loretto Abbey Catholic Secondary School to the area.

The neighbourhood grew in stages and was finally completed during the 1960s. Both St. John's Anglican Church and Baron Renfrew School (renamed to York Mills Public School) grew in size, with various additions. Agricola Finnish Lutheran Church was built in 1967, serving Toronto and area's Finnish Lutheran community.

In 1982, York Mills Public School was decommissioned and renovated as office space for the Metro Toronto school board (used until 1998). The historic two-room schoolhouse exterior was restored. The school was demolished in 2004, and bricks from it were used to create a memorial.

The Miller Tavern (formerly the Jolly Miller Tavern), c. 1857, located at the bottom of Hoggs Hollow Hill, 3885 Yonge Street, was closed for many years, but re-opened in 2004 after many battles between developers, the city and groups that wanted to preserve the historical landmark. The George S. Pratt House, c. 1886, located at 17 Mill Street, is another historic landmark in Hoggs Hollow. In need of funds, The York Mills Public School building was sold by the school board and demolished. Many of the original estate homes and modern movement residences of the early to mid-20th century are being demolished in favour of large new homes. With a densely developed business area, many businesses and services are available, and while church attendance has diminished at St. John's, other churches and synagogues now serve the people of the area.

Periodically, attempts have been made to reconnect portions of the valley with new roads to the higher-set neighbourhoods of the ridges above.

== Public transportation ==
In 1892, the Metropolitan Street Railway extended streetcar service along Yonge Street from Toronto (Summerhill) to the southern rim of Hoggs Hollow near today's Glen Echo Road, and then through the valley to Richmond Hill in 1897. This radial railway service through the valley ended in 1948. However, the Yonge streetcar line continued to operate service from Glen Echo Road to downtown Toronto until 1954. Since 1973, Hoggs Hollow has been served by York Mills subway station.

== Disasters ==
On October 15, 1954, the valley was inundated by Hurricane Hazel, and many attempts have since been made to manage water in the natural watershed of a valley, though many homes are still prone to moisture and flooding from the water table. A steel truss bridge carrying Yonge Street across the river was damaged and temporarily replaced by a Bailey bridge until a new bridge was built.

On March 17, 1960, the incident popularly known as the "Hoggs Hollow Disaster" occurred. Five young Italian immigrant workers were killed while constructing a tunnel for a water main at Hoggs Hollow. The details of the accident, where they were trapped 35 feet underground in a cramped, dimly lit tunnel, sparked a public outcry over the lack of safety standards in construction. Ultimately, the outcry – including stop work actions by concerned construction workers – led to an improvement in working conditions, such as the passing of Ontario's 1964 Industrial Safety Act.

== See also ==
- Hogg's Hollow Bridge
