= Loretto Abbey Catholic Secondary School =

Roman Catholic school in Ontario, Canada

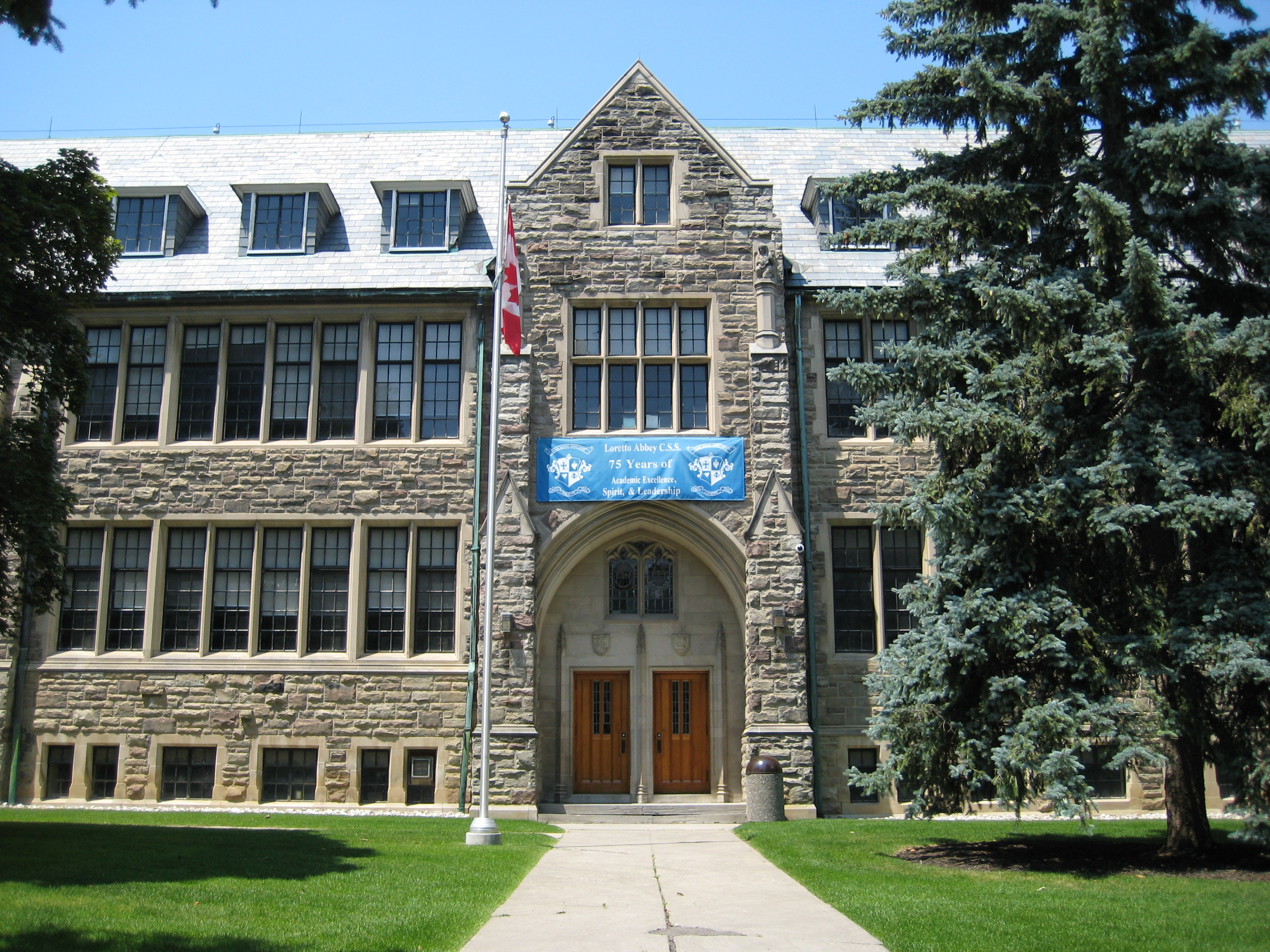

Location
- 101 Mason Boulevard; Hoggs Hollow, North York, Ontario, M5M 3E2; Canada; 43°44′28.71″N 79°24′40.40″W

Information
- School type: All girls Roman Catholic high school
- Motto: Cruci Dum Spiro Fido (Throughout My Life, I Shall Place My Hope in the Cross)
- Religious affiliations: Roman Catholic; Loretto Sisters
- Founded: 1847
- School board: Toronto Catholic District School Board (Metropolitan Separate School Board)
- Superintendent: George Danfulani; Area 4
- Area trustee: Maria Rizzo; Ward 5
- School number: 510 / 728055
- Principal: Lily Ann Adams
- Grades: 9–12
- Enrolment: 963 (2017–18)
- Language: English
- Colour: Double blue
- Mascot: Alligator
- Team name: (Loretto) Abbey Gators
- Specialist High Skills Major: Business; Information and Communications Technology; Non-Profit
- Website: tcdsb.org/o/lorettoabbey

Loretto Abbey Catholic Secondary School (sporadically known as Loretto Abbey CSS, LACSS, Loretto Abbey, LAT, Loretto Abbey Toronto or The Abbey) is an all-girls Catholic secondary school in Hogg's Hollow neighbourhood of Toronto, Ontario, Canada. Established by the Loretto Sisters in 1847, it is one of Toronto's oldest educational institutions and is part of the Toronto Catholic District School Board (then the Metropolitan Separate School Board) since 1987.

Loretto Abbey operates on the non-semestered system offering Advanced Placement, academic and applied courses; approximately 85% of the school's courses are offered at the academic level, educating girls to university-entrance standards. The school offers co-operative education, extended French, Advanced Placement programmes and special education (resource and gifted).

== History ==
The school was established as an all girls private school in 1847 by Irish Sisters of Loreto (also known as the Institute of the Blessed Virgin Mary, also known as IBVM, founded in France by the Venerable Mary Ward, an English recusant, in 1609). Ward advocated excellent education for young women, which has always formed part of the ethos of Loretto schools.

The Loreto Sisters arrived in Toronto from Rathfarnham, Ireland, in 1847 at the invitation of Michael Power, the first Roman Catholic bishop of Toronto. The school was named after their previous home of Loreto Abbey near Dublin. The first superior of the Toronto community and principal of the school was Mother Teresa Ellen Dease, I.B.V.M.

Originally located on Duke Street, Loretto Abbey moved to a Bathurst Street site and then to Bond Street in 1860. In 1867 the school relocated to the former mansion of Attorney General Robert Sympson Jameson on Wellington Street. In 1927, the school moved to its current home (leaving Loretta Abbey to Jesuit seminary), a Collegiate Gothic Tudor style building on Mason Boulevard by architects Findlay and Foulis. The school is attached to Loretto Abbey, the motherhouse of the Loretto Sisters in Canada. At one time, the Mason Boulevard building housed boarders and a private primary school in addition to the secondary school. The primary school, which was also run by the Loreto Sisters resident in the attached convent, closed in 1985.

=== Loretto Abbey under MSSB/TCDSB rule (1967–present) ===
In 1967, at the request of the Ontario Bishops, students in Grades 9 and 10 were placed under the Metropolitan Separate School Board and no longer had to pay tuition. Fees were still charged for Grades 11–13. In 1984, the Ontario government began funding the last three years of high school and the Abbey role as a private school was abolished. On January 1, 1998, the MSSB became the Toronto Catholic District School Board.

In 2011, the Loretto Sisters agreed to a sale of the entire Abbey to the TCDSB, with the exception of the infirmary, which greatly increased the space available for classrooms and other facilities.

Toronto City Council intends to designate the lands and buildings known municipally as 101 Mason Boulevard (Loretto Abbey), under Part IV, Section 29 of the Ontario Heritage Act."

== Fraser Institute ranking ==
Loretto Abbey Catholic Secondary School has a ranking of 79 out of 623 in the most recent five years as follows: 7.3 in 2012, 8.2 in 2013, 8.1 in 2014, 7.8 in 2015, and 7.1 in 2016.

The Fraser Institute's 2015-16 report on Loretto Abbey Catholic Secondary School gave it an overall grade of 7.1/10, ranking it at 201 of 740 secondary schools in Ontario.

== Campus and facilities ==
The historic Tudor-gothic school building is located in a green neighbourhood adjacent to the Don Valley. The school has access to the Chapel in the Abbey, a pool, a gymnasium, computer facilities, a library, a 300-seat auditorium, a courtyard, a prayer garden and grotto, and a playing field.

In 2021, the school announced it would be converting the closed-off infirmary into an extension of the school, with plans to include new state-of-the-art science labs, classrooms, dance studios, a new front entry, and a gym. Updates confirm that as of November 2025, the infirmary has been demolished, with construction to start the spring of 2026.

The Abbey campus was used as a filming location for the 2002 Disney movie, Cadet Kelly.

== Co-curricular programme and traditions ==
Loretto Abbey offers a wide range of service, social, and athletic activities to develop students to their full potential.

Clubs and Teams: Abbey Singers, Abbey Times, Asian Alliance, Multicultural Club, Anime Club, Debate Team, Dance Team, Daughters of the Immaculate Heart of Mary, Global Goals, Business Club, Coding and Robotics Club, Youth in Medicine, Filipino Club, Irish Club, Italian Club, Arts and Crafts Club, LAT Concert Choir, Peer Tutors, Greek Club, Science Club, Skills Canada Team, Hispanic Club, Model UN, Cooking Club, Baking Club, GSA, Yearbook Club, Music Council, Concert Bands, Jazz Ensemble, HOSA Club.

Sports: badminton, basketball, cross country, curling, field hockey, golf, hockey, ski team, soccer, soft ball, swimming, table tennis, tennis, track and field, volleyball.

Some annual traditions at Loretto include: Mother & Daughter Tea, Loretto Abbey Film Festival, Christmas Baskets, International Picnic, Multicultural Night, Father and Daughter Barbecue, Academic Awards Night, Athletic Banquet, March Break Trips (International), Semi-Formal, Spring Concert, Annual Drama Production and many more.

== Overseas programmes ==
Loretto Abbey students participated in the 2009 India Study and Leadership Programme. The students participated in service learning and volunteered at Loretto schools in Calcutta, Darjeeling, and New Delhi. This excursion was in celebration of the 400th anniversary of the Loretto Sisters and marked an ongoing involvement of the Sisters in maintaining the Mary Ward ethos at the school. The third trip occurred in March, 2012.

The Abbey also fundraises every year for Loretto schools overseas and for charities in need. In 2007, for instance, $25,000 was raised for Loreto St. Vincent's Primary School in Darjeeling. $10,000 was raised for the new Loreto school is South Sudan in 2012. Proceeds from events like dances and civies day go towards the annual charity.

== Alumnae ==
- Shelley Solmes – CBC Radio 2 host
- Carly Foulkes – model and actress
- Jordan Sinclair - golden globes awarded actress
- Germaine Guèvremont – writer and winner of the 1950 Governor-General's Award
- Ida Hawley – actress
- Yolanda Gampp – Host of How to Cake It
- Anna Olson – TV Host and professionally trained chef
- Sister Margaret O'Neill (Mother Agatha) – founder of Loretto College at University of Toronto
- Ivana Santilli – musician (Bass is Base)
- Jess Walton – actress (The Young and the Restless)
- Elina Leung – actress (Law & Order Toronto: Criminal Intent)
- Maggie Kang - storyboard artist and writer (Director of KPop Demon Hunters)

== Gallery ==
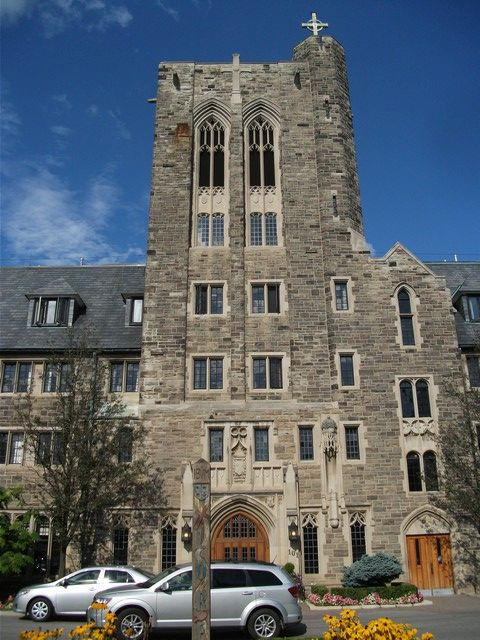
Abbey entrance

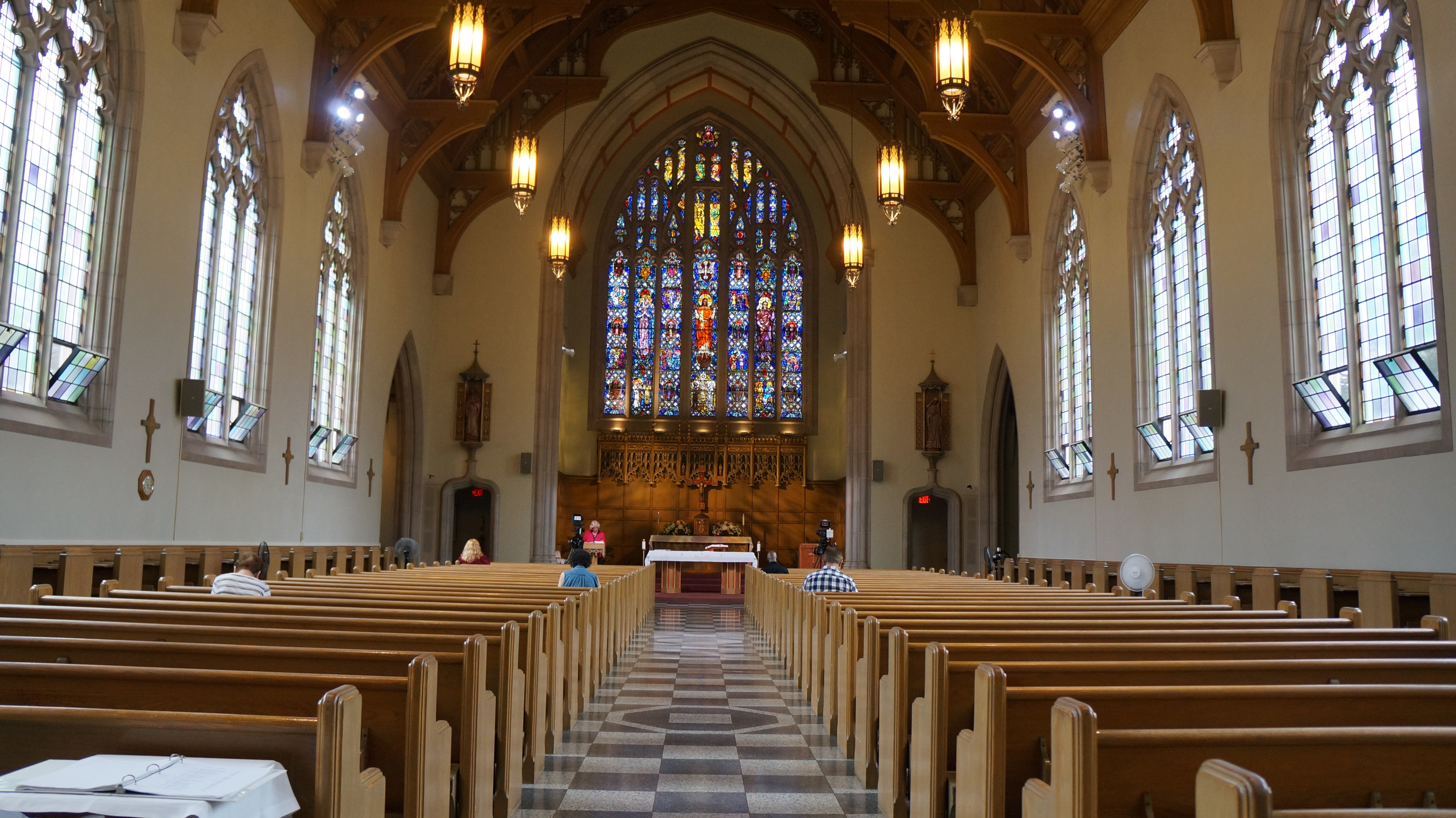
Chapel

== See also ==
- Education in Ontario
- List of secondary schools in Ontario
