= York Mills Road =

Road in Toronto, Canada

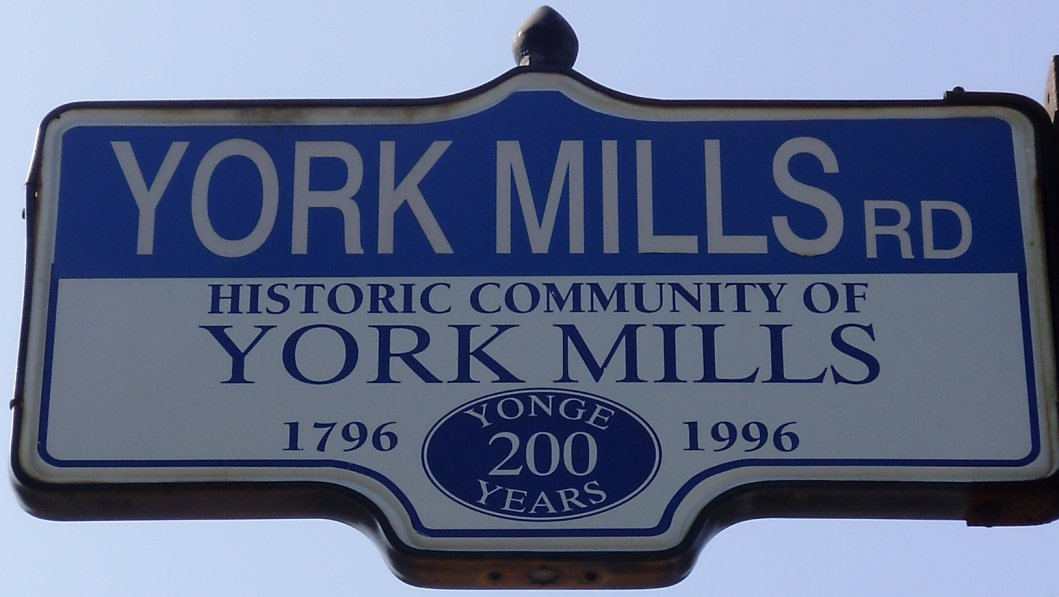

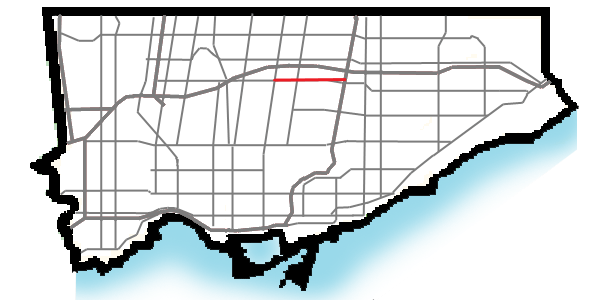
- Maintained by: City of Toronto
- Length: 7.5 km (4.7 mi)
- Location: Toronto
- West end: Yonge Street (continues as Wilson Avenue)
- Major junctions: Bayview Avenue; Leslie Street; Don Mills Road; Don Valley Parkway; Parkwoods Village Drive (link to Ellesmere Road)
- East end: Victoria Park Avenue

Other
Nearby arterial roads in Toronto
← Lawrence Avenue	Sheppard Avenue →

York Mills Road is an east–west route in Toronto, Ontario, Canada named for the historic village of York Mills that was located on the hill immediately north of today's intersection of York Mills Road and Yonge Street. The village of York Mills is distinguished from the 1920s subdivision to the south known as Hoggs Hollow. "York" refers to York Township and "Mills" refers to the gristmills and sawmills that once operated (1804–1926) in the valley through which the Don River runs.

York Mills runs east from Yonge Street as a continuation of Wilson Avenue and ends at Victoria Park Avenue. Just west of Victoria Park, the through road defaults onto Parkwoods Village Drive, which serves as a link connecting through traffic to Ellesmere Road, while the short easternmost section of York Mills itself is a bypassed two-lane side street. These roads form a parallel alternative to the nearby Highway 401. Based on early surveys of Toronto and York County, York Mills Road was the Fifth Concession.

In the 1970s, when the Toronto Transit Commission extended the Line 1 Yonge subway line north from the Eglinton terminus, a new roadway alignment from York Mills to Wilson was completed in 1973 to accommodate 96 Wilson Avenue buses running directly to the new York Mills subway station rather than travelling south on Yonge Boulevard to Yonge Street terminus at Glen Echo Loop. Landmarks along York Mills Road include a recreation complex at Bayview Avenue, York Mills Collegiate Institute, a large Rogers Communications complex past Leslie Street, and the former site of the Upjohn Company of Canada near Don Mills Road at Upjohn Road.

== Public transit ==
There is a subway station on York mills at Yonge street, named York Mills Station.

Toronto Transit Commission's (TTC) operates a few bus routes on York Mills, the main route being the 95 York Mills, that operates along the length of the road from York Mills Station until it turns Parkwoods Village Drive. It heads southeast until turns into Ellesmere Road and continues along it until the end of the road at Kingston Road. There are also two express buses, the 995 York Mills express and 996 Wilson Express, and a night bus, being the 395 York Mills Blue Night. West of Lesmill Road the 122 Graydon Hall joins as a feeder into York Mills Station, and west of Leslie Street, the rush hour 115 Sliver Hills operates as a feeder too.

Before 2020, the 144 Don Valley-Downtown Express operated along the section of York Mills from Parkwoods Village to Victoria Park along a clockwise loop via York Mills, Victoria Park, and Parkwoods Village.
