= Spadina subway line =

1978 extension of Toronto subway line

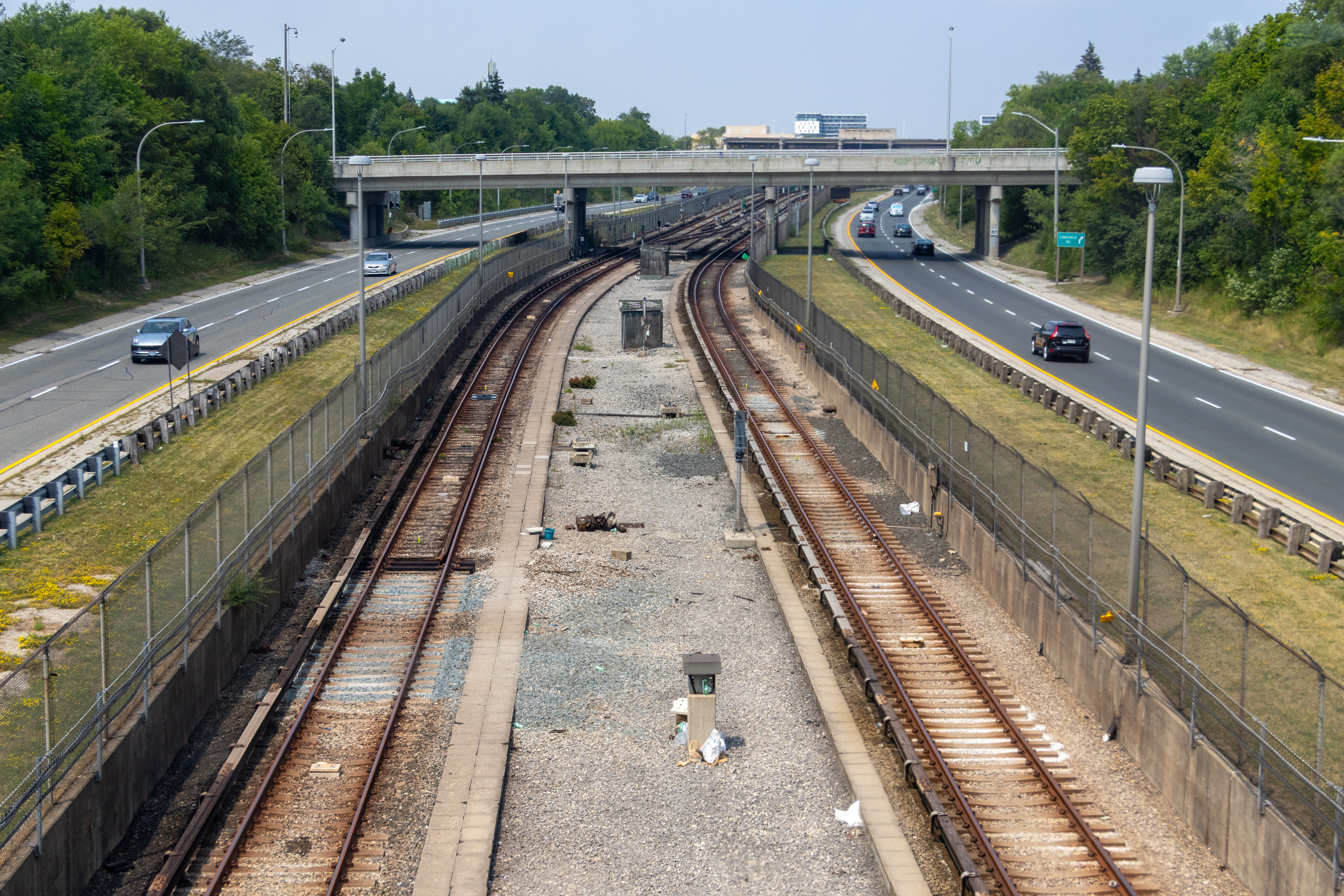
- The line running along the median of Allen Road

Overview
- Locale: Toronto
- Stations: 8

Service
- Type: Rapid transit
- Operator: Toronto Transit Commission

History
- Opened: January 28, 1978; 48 years ago

Technical
- Track gauge: 1,495 mm (4 ft 10 7/8 in) Toronto gauge
The Spadina subway highlighted on a 1996 subway system map
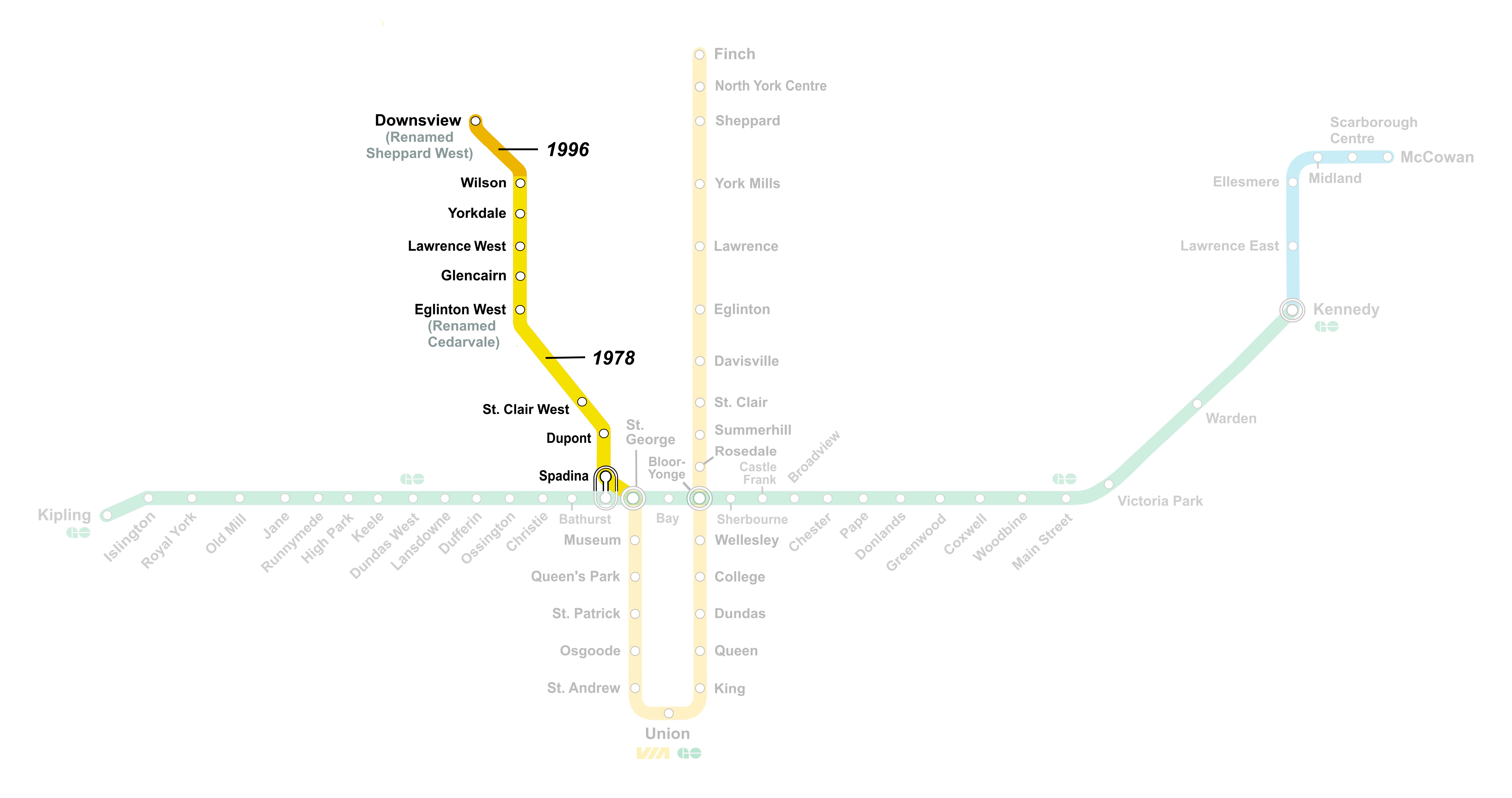

The Spadina subway line (usually called either the Spadina subway or the Spadina line) was the former name of a portion of the northwestern branch of the Toronto subway's Line 1 Yonge–University built in 1978 and extended in 1996.

The first section was a 9.9-kilometre (6.2 mi) eight-station extension of the University branch, which opened on January 28, 1978, along the route of the partially built Spadina Expressway from St. George station to Wilson station. Initially proposed to run along Christie Street as a separate line, the plan was revised to follow the expressway route in 1959. The project was then postponed twice: first in 1964, to build extensions of the Bloor–Danforth line and then again in 1965, to build a northerly extension of the Yonge Street branch of the line. In the 1970s, the impending construction of the expressway meant that the TTC decided to pursue the project if funds could be found. However, the partially built Spadina Expressway's cancellation in 1971 led the TTC to consider running the route down Bathurst Street, south of the constructed section of the expressway. Despite the City of Toronto's strong opposition, the TTC and Ontario government moved forward with the Spadina route.

Construction on the extension began in 1974 and opened in 1978. In a first for the TTC, external architects designed most of the stations on the extension and all stations featured public art. Following the opening of the extension, ridership was less than expected, though it did reduce crowding on the Yonge branch.

Construction of an extension northwards to Sheppard Avenue began in 1992, with Downsview station (later renamed Sheppard West) opening in 1996. It was the first step to either extend the line further to York University or loop it back to the Yonge branch. An extension to the university (and beyond to Vaughan Metropolitan Centre in the City of Vaughan) was chosen and built. It was dubbed the Toronto–York Spadina subway extension (TYSSE) during planning and construction, and opened in 2017.

In 2014, the TTC assigned numbers to its subway lines and also removed Spadina from the line's name, referring to it as Line 1 Yonge–University.

== Background ==
The Yonge line, Toronto's first subway, began construction in 1949 and opened on March 30, 1954, running between Union and Eglinton stations. The line was extended north along University Avenue to St. George station at Bloor Street in February 1963 as part of the Bloor–University subway project. The Bloor–University project also saw construction of the initial section of Line 2 Bloor–Danforth, which opened in February 1966.

Study of an expressway extension of Spadina Road began in 1954 and was approved by Metropolitan Toronto in 1957, though construction was not expected to begin for five to ten years. However, construction was accelerated over threats by the developers of Yorkdale Shopping Centre to only build the mall if the expressway were constructed. The expressway had already received opposition from York Township over destruction of the Cedarvale Ravine. The township preferred subway construction. The expressway would lead to major protest from residents and ratepayer groups in the 1960s and 1970s.

== Planning ==
=== Initial plans and route dispute (1955–1961) ===
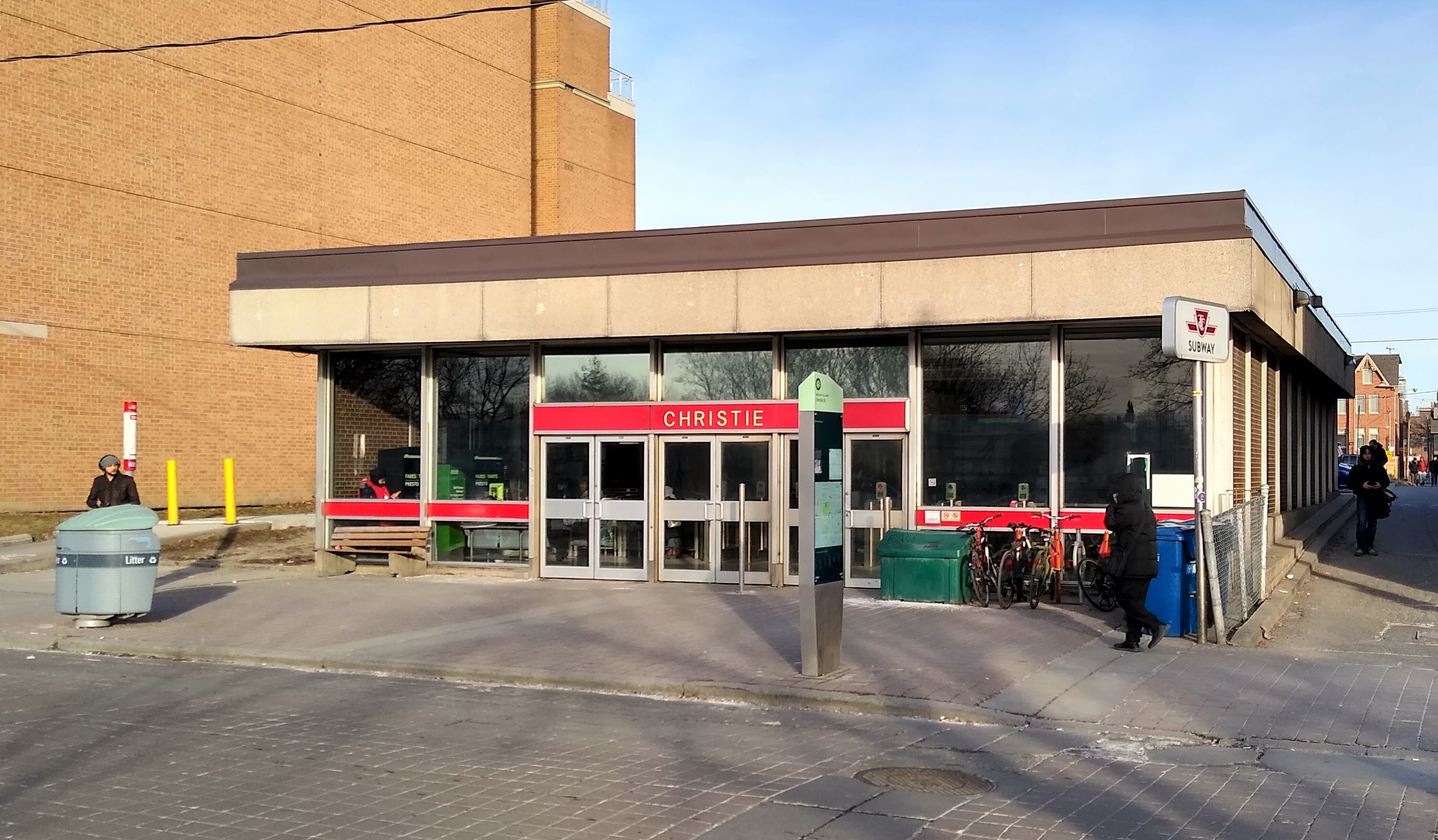
Christie station, the originally planned terminus of what was initially intended to be a Spadina subway line separate from the existing Line 1

By the end of 1955, city planners at Metropolitan Toronto had begun studying a subway to be built as part of the Spadina Expressway project to provide an additional connection to the proposed Bloor–Danforth line. As originally proposed, it would be a new line running along Christie Street as it approached Bloor Street, connecting with the Bloor–Danforth line at the proposed Christie station. North of St. Clair Avenue, the route would enter the Cedarvale Ravine and join the Spadina Expressway there. A Christie route was planned to be extended further south in the future to the proposed Queen subway line but, when initially opened, would require passengers to transfer to the Bloor–Danforth line to reach downtown. TTC transit consultant Norman D. Wilson called for the line to form a large U, continuing on Queen to Leslie Street then running northeast to Thorncliffe Park, Don Mills, and Scarborough.

Toronto subway map as of 2026 with the original 1978 Spadina section highlighted in red and the 1996 extension in blue

However, the plan was revised in 1959 to run fully along the Spadina Expressway route (which was to be built along Spadina Road and Spadina Avenue south of the Cedarvale Ravine) and connect with the Bloor–Danforth line at St. George station. A route along Christie would have been shorter and served a more densely populated area, but a route connecting at St. George would be able to function as an extension of the University line or at least connect directly with it. However, it would prevent Bloor trains from running directly downtown via the University line as then proposed. The connection between the two lines would be about 1.6 kilometres (1 mi) east of its originally proposed location. At the time, construction was expected to be done in conjunction with the Spadina Expressway.

This revision was reversed by the TTC in March 1960, causing friction between the TTC and Metropolitan Toronto, which had approved the Spadina Expressway route. The TTC argued the Christie route was $3 million cheaper and avoided complications at the wye junction between the Bloor and University lines. The TTC reversed its decision, initially that April and again in May, reinstating the Spadina route. The April meeting had been done in secret by three of the commissioners while Christie line supporter Ford Brand was vacationing. Brand only heard of the meeting from a phone call by a reporter. This led to infighting between the TTC's commissioners as well as with Metropolitan Toronto. The issue of which riders would need to transfer and construction of the necessary wye to interline Bloor and University services were the primary sources of disagreement. In June 1960, Metropolitan Toronto Council voted to build the full wye and the line as an extension of the University subway. The TTC continued to prefer the Spadina route over the Christie route despite Brand's continued protest.

=== Postponement (1961–1970) ===
Since 1959, the Spadina line had been expected to be constructed following the completion of the Bloor–Danforth line. However, in 1962, Metropolitan Toronto chair William Allen proposed extending the Bloor–Danforth line first, with a busway to occupy the median of the Spadina Expressway temporarily. This move was opposed by Metro planning commissioner Murray Jones, who noted the Yonge line was already nearing capacity. In 1962, Metropolitan Toronto's transportation committee recommended extensions of the Bloor–Danforth line be given priority despite the possibility of delaying the Spadina line and by 1964, the Bloor–Danforth extensions were to be built before the Spadina line.

In 1964, there was again debate on which subway line would be built next. Being considered were the Spadina line, the Queen line, a line to Weston, and a northerly extension of the Yonge line. Supporters of the Spadina line stated the Yonge line would be overcrowded if its extension were built first. Despite this, in October 1965, Metropolitan Toronto voted in favour of extending the Yonge line first. Additionally, a long-term plan released by the TTC in 1966 called for the Queen line to be constructed first, which would potentially further delay the Spadina line. This led Allen to endorse the Christie route, which would again be voted down by the TTC in July 1968.

In 1968, the TTC recommended the Spadina line be the first subway extension built once the Yonge extension is completed, which was then expected to be in 1972. At this point, the line was expected to open in 1983, but Metro Toronto's 1969 decision to speed up construction of the Spadina Expressway caused the TTC to start looking for the $53 million required to build the Spadie line, as the tax levy normally used for subway construction was being used for the Yonge extension. Metro Toronto Council considered delaying the section of the Yonge subway extension from Sheppard to Finch to build the Spadina line faster, but this was defeated by a 16–6 vote in August 1970.

=== Approval after cancellation of Spadina Expressway (1970–1973) ===
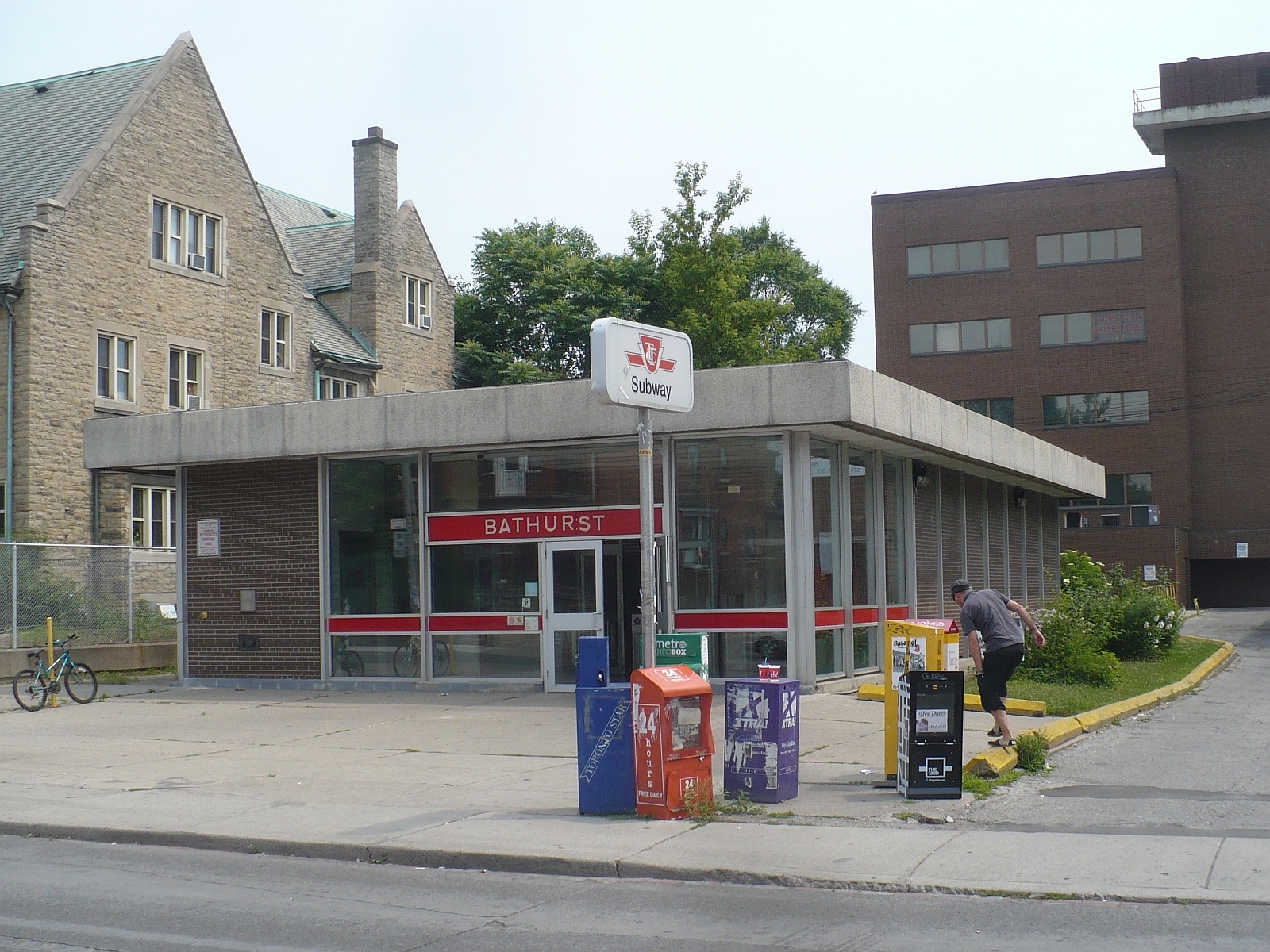
Following the cancellation of the Spadina Expressway, the TTC considered routing the line to Bathurst station.

In late 1969, construction work on the Spadina Expressway was halted while the Ontario government reviewed the project, which was unpopular with area residents. The review ended with the June 1971 decision by Premier Bill Davis and his cabinet to cancel the expressway but support the quick construction of the proposed subway along its route. In 1970, the Toronto Planning Board recommended another review of the subway route, this time proposing the line run down Vaughan Road and Bathurst Street south of Eglinton Avenue. The board did not believe the Spadina Expressway routing would be cheaper than a Bathurst route, which was the reason the TTC was supporting it at the time. Anti-expressway activist and author Jane Jacobs also criticized the Spadina route and preferred a subway on Bathurst, believing a Spadina route would be more difficult for pedestrians to access, leading to lower ridership.

In October 1971, following the expressway's cancellation, Davis announced the line would continue to follow the expressway's route. Metro Toronto chair Albert Campbell protested Davis' decision, believing Metro should decide the route. Metro had already formed a committee to determine which route would work best, which was expected to report on its findings within a month. The TTC did not want the route to change. The committee recommended a route just west of the Bathurst route despite determining it would cost $169 million and require 150 expropriations, compared to $141 million and fewer expropriations for the Spadina route without the expressway. The Spadina route was forecast to be the cheapest and quickest to build. The proposed Bathurst-area routings all went to St. George, and route alternatives continued to be considered in 1972. Early that year, Metro Toronto was sent 130 briefs recommending the Spadina route under the belief it would allow the Spadina Expressway to be built.

While the routing was undecided, the TTC began design work on the section of the line north of Eglinton Avenue. The City of Toronto strongly opposed the Spadina route, voting in favour of a route under Bathurst Street or Dufferin Street in March 1972. Metro Toronto's transportation committee supported the Bathurst route, but Metro again approved the Spadina route in a September 1972 council vote. It was estimated to cost $154 or 155 million and take four and a half years to complete. The Bathurst route was expected to cost $40 million more. The City of Toronto appealed to the Ontario Municipal Board, then to the Ontario Cabinet, calling the route a waste of money and arguing it would destroy the Cedarvale Ravine, but both also approved the Spadina route, respectively in May and August 1973.

=== Continued dispute with the City of Toronto (1974) ===
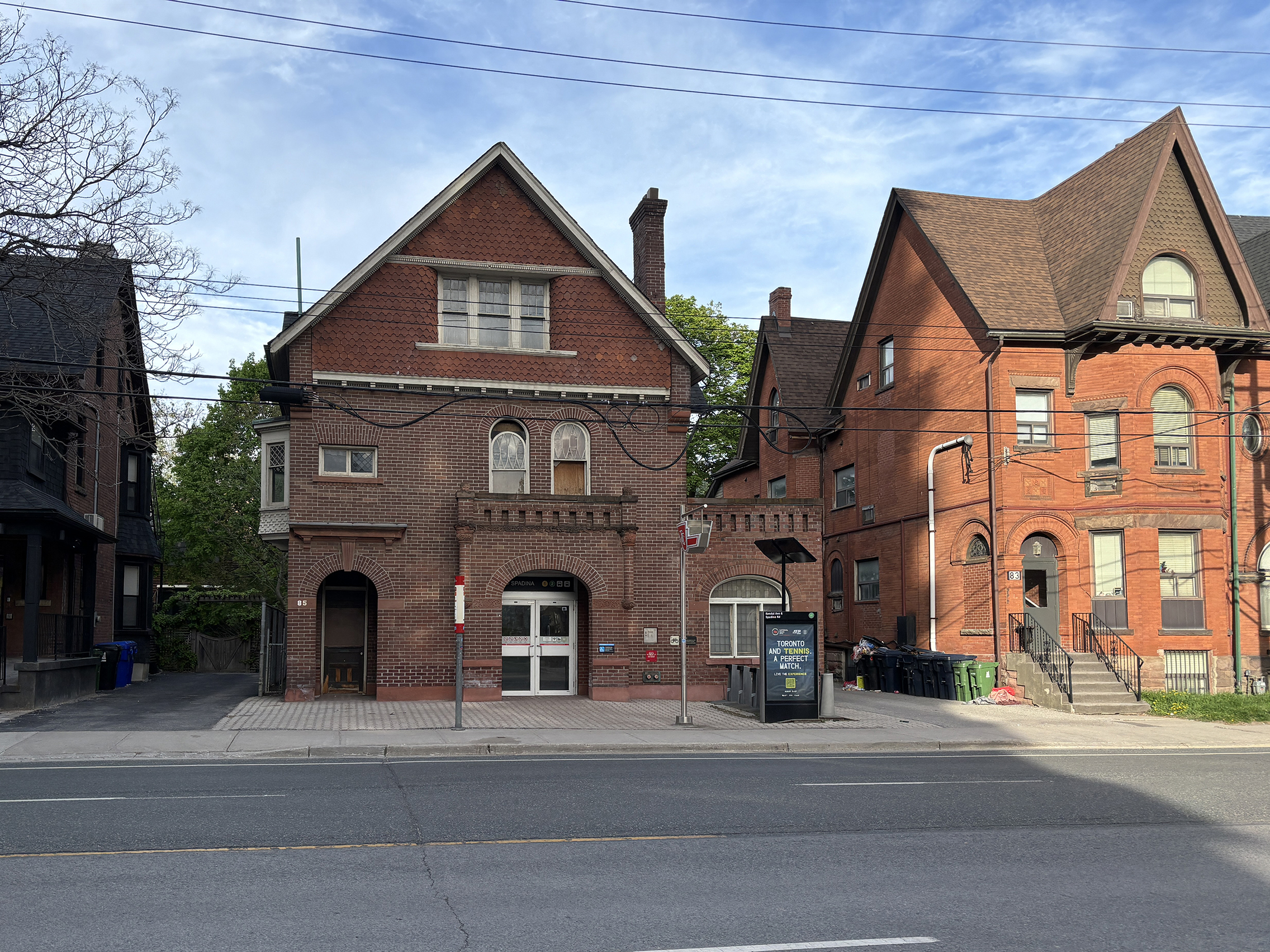
Spadina station's northern exit, which is converted from a mansion known as Gash House and is where Lowther station would have been built

In early 1974, residents of the Annex asked the TTC not to build Lowther station, which was planned approximately 150 metres (490 ft) north of Spadina station. The TTC studied it that spring and approved the station in May. In July 1974, the TTC admitted that Lowther station would possibly be the terminus of the line and require passengers to transfer to the Bloor–Danforth line to go downtown. However, the TTC was not planning this and would only do it if passenger volumes warranted it. Additionally, an underground pedestrian connection with Spadina station via a moving sidewalk would allow some riders to avoid transferring at St. George.

Lowther was planned to be built north of Spadina to allow trains to turn into St. George station, but the TTC did not believe St. George would have the required capacity for another line. Lowther could also be used to turn trains back in case of an emergency. Toronto City Council reacted angrily, stating the station would harm the Annex and passing a motion for the TTC to study not building Lowther station despite such a study likely delaying the line by up to a year. Metropolitan Toronto's Executive Committee asked the TTC to consider not building Lowther but the TTC refused due to the potential delay and increased costs. A week later, the TTC persuaded Metro Toronto to stop opposing the station.

== Design ==
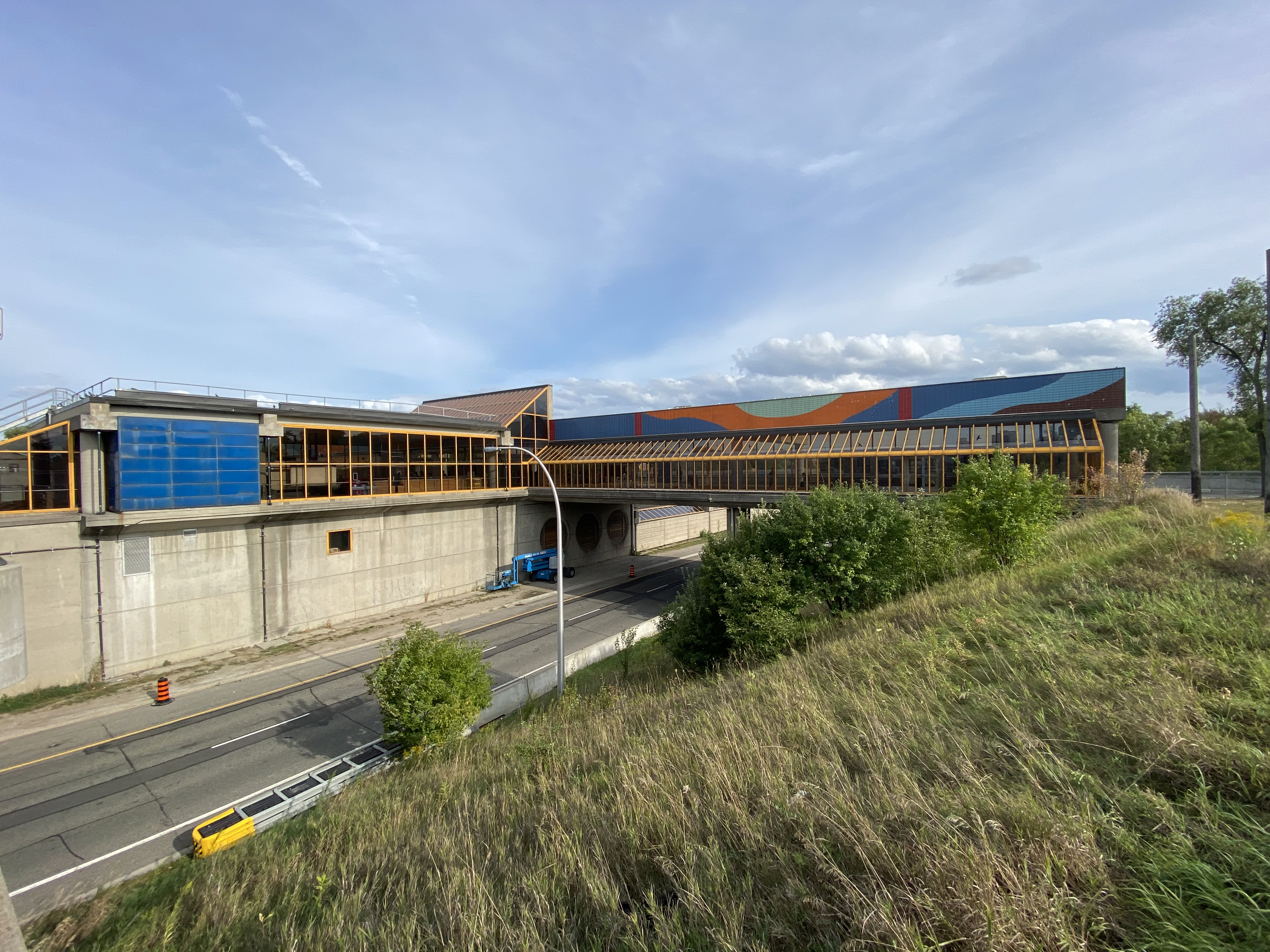
Lawrence West station exterior depicting Spacing... Aerial Highways by artist Claude Breeze

The line runs 9.9 kilometres (6.2 mi) with eight stations from Wilson station near Wilson Heights to St. George station as part of Line 1 Yonge–University. All stations from Glencairn north have centre platforms, with the others having side platforms. Only 600 metres (2,000 ft) of the line was tunnelled, through an escarpment from Davenport Road to just south of St. Clair Avenue near Casa Loma. The remaining underground sections were built using cut-and-cover construction, and the section north of Eglinton Avenue was built in the median of the existing sections of the Spadina Expressway (now Allen Road). The line's route travels under the Cedarvale and Nordheimer Ravines between St. Clair and Eglinton Avenues. The tracks were equipped with shock absorbers to make the trains run more smoothly.

=== Architecture and public art ===
Unlike previous subway stations in Toronto, all stations on the Spadina line have unique designs in contrast to the "sterile" designs the Toronto subway had been criticized for, especially in comparison to the architecture of the Montreal Metro. In 1974, the TTC selected three architecture firms (Adamson Associates, Dunlop Farrow Aitken and Arthur Erickson Architects) to design six of the stations, with in-house TTC architects led by Herta Freyberg designing St. Clair West and Wilson owing to their complexity. Stations would also have public art, the first public art in Toronto's subway system. 400 entries were received in an open competition, and nine artists from Ontario were selected: Ted Bieler, Claude Breeze, Louis de Niverville, Michael Hayden, Rita Letendre, Gordon Rayner, James Sutherland, Joyce Wieland and Gerald Zeldin.

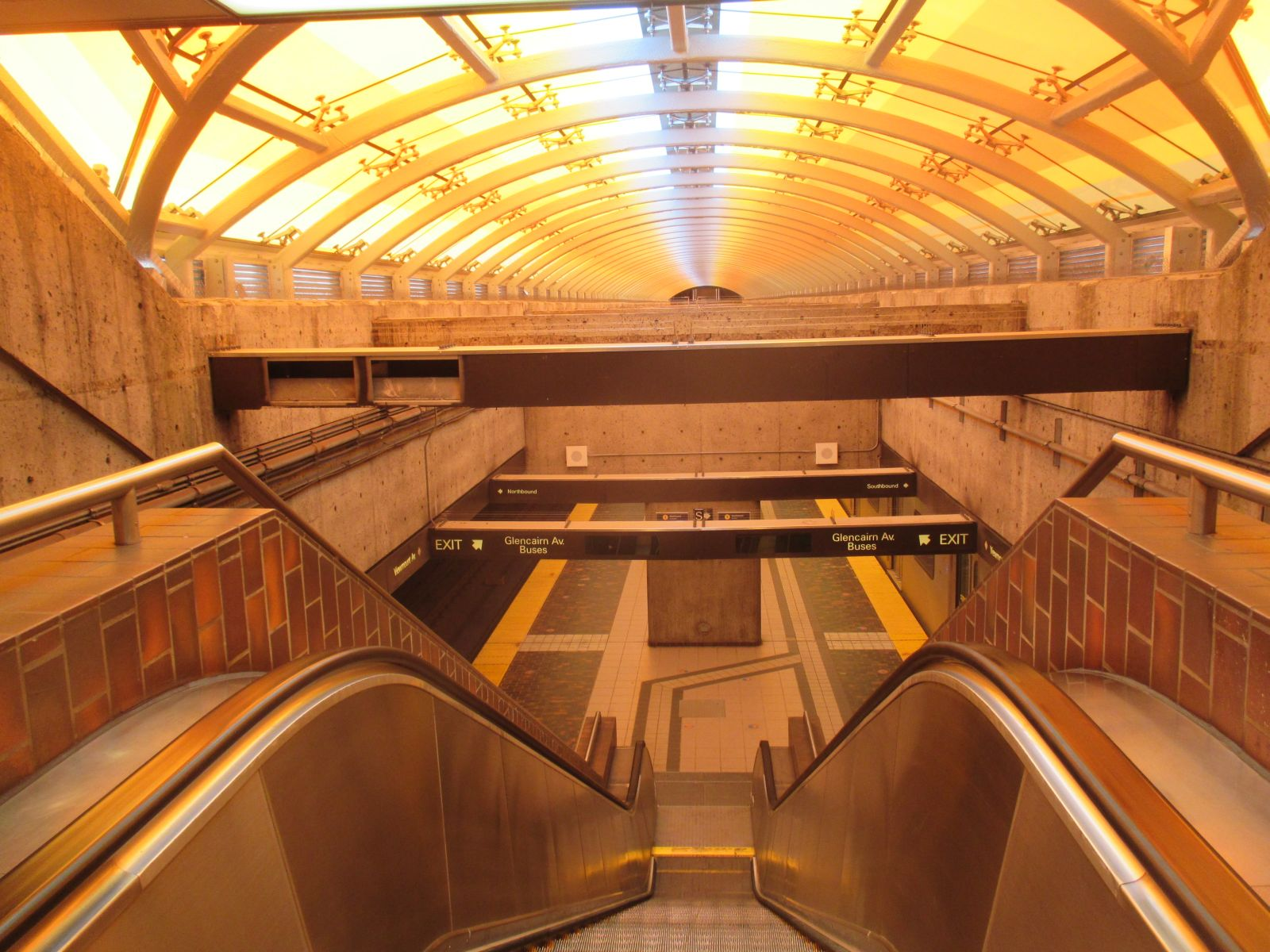
Glencairn station following the re-installation of its stained glass artwork Joy by artist Rita Letendre.

In late 1974, the TTC agreed to spend up to $500,000 for art in the line's stations. However, they postponed it after receiving hundreds of angry calls in January 1975. Later that month, the TTC began exhibiting art from the artists proposed to work on the line's stations at the Art Gallery of Ontario, hoping the public would appreciate it. By that point, the TTC had begun raising money from individuals and corporations to finance the art and obtained enough money to move forward with the project that July, aided by matching funds of up to $175,000 from the Ontario government through Wintario funds. However, the TTC was still $90,000 short of the amount required to purchase the proposed eight art works for the line, down from the originally proposed ten. The TTC decided to fund the remaining amount not raised through its 1977 capital budget.

All stations had at least one artwork when the line opened, with works including wall art, a tile mosaic flower mural at Dupont station, 230 metres (750 ft) of colourful mercury-vapour lamps at Yorkdale that would light up in a pattern when a train passed and a coloured stained glass work above Glencairn station. The total cost of the art was $330,000. Owing to maintenance issues, the deteriorated stained glass artwork at Glencairn and the colourful lighting at Yorkdale were removed in the 1990s. The work at Glencairn was reinstalled in 2020, and the light artwork at Yorkdale is planned to be restored in future.

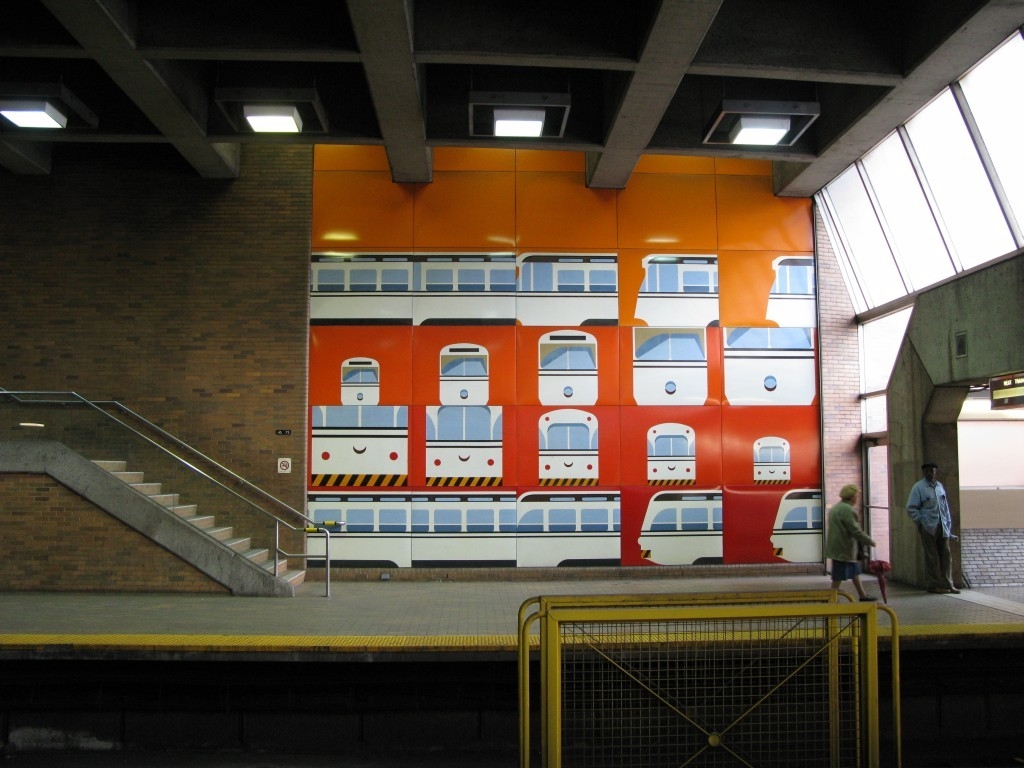
Summertime Streetcar by artist Gerald Zeldin, a mural at Cedarvale station (formerly Eglinton West)

The architecture of the stations has been praised, with Canadian Architect stating that they "reflected the exuberance and expressionism of Canada's Centennial", and Spacing noting that stations had "architectural verve with vibrant and well-integrated artwork".

Station architects and artworks
Station	Architect	Public art
Spadina	Adamson Associates	Barren Ground Caribou by Joyce Wieland
Spadina	Adamson Associates	Morning Glory by Louis de Niverville
Dupont	Dunlop Farrow Aitken	Miscellaneous Hardware by Ron Baird
Dupont	Dunlop Farrow Aitken	Spadina Summer Under All Seasons by James Sutherland
St. Clair West	In-house TTC architects	Tempo by Gordon Rayner
Eglinton West	Arthur Erickson Architects	Summertime Streetcar by Gerald Zeldin
Glencairn	Adamson Associates	Joy by Rita Letendre
Lawrence West	Dunlop Farrow Aitken	Spacing... Aerial Highways by Claude Breeze
Yorkdale	Arthur Erickson Architects	Arc en ciel by Michael Hayden
Wilson	In-house TTC architects	Canyons by Ted Bieler

=== Parking ===
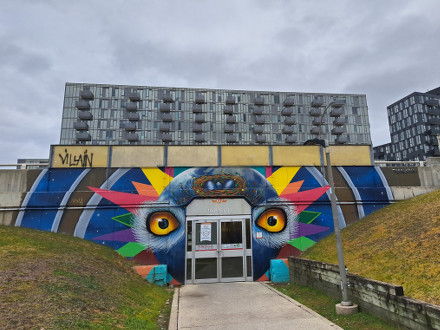
Wilson station entrance from former parking lot that was later redeveloped into condominiums and big-box retail stores

During construction of the line, the City of Toronto supported the construction of a parking garage at Eglinton West station, at the south end of Allen Road. This was partly to provide an easy way for drivers to leave their cars but also to prevent its extension farther south. While the Ontario government supported providing parking on the line, the City of Toronto protested their inclusion of potential sites north of Lawrence Avenue for parking. Metro Toronto preferred to build parking at Wilson station and to offer it potentially at Yorkdale Shopping Centre near Yorkdale station. Yorkdale ultimately refused to provide parking to commuters. The line opened with only Wilson station offering parking at a 1,405-space surface lot. In September 1976, Metro Toronto and North York agreed that Metro would own and North York would operate parking at the end of the line at Wilson station.

In February 2017, the TTC opened 1,000 parking spaces as part of a multi-level garage at Yorkdale Mall exclusively for commuters arriving between 5:30 and 9:30 a.m., replacing a smaller lot at Wilson station which closed the previous December. In November 2024, the remaining parking lot at Wilson station was closed for condominium development. Additional parking remains as part of the farther-north Toronto–York Spadina subway extension and at Sheppard West station. 72 parking spaces remain at Wilson station.

== Construction ==
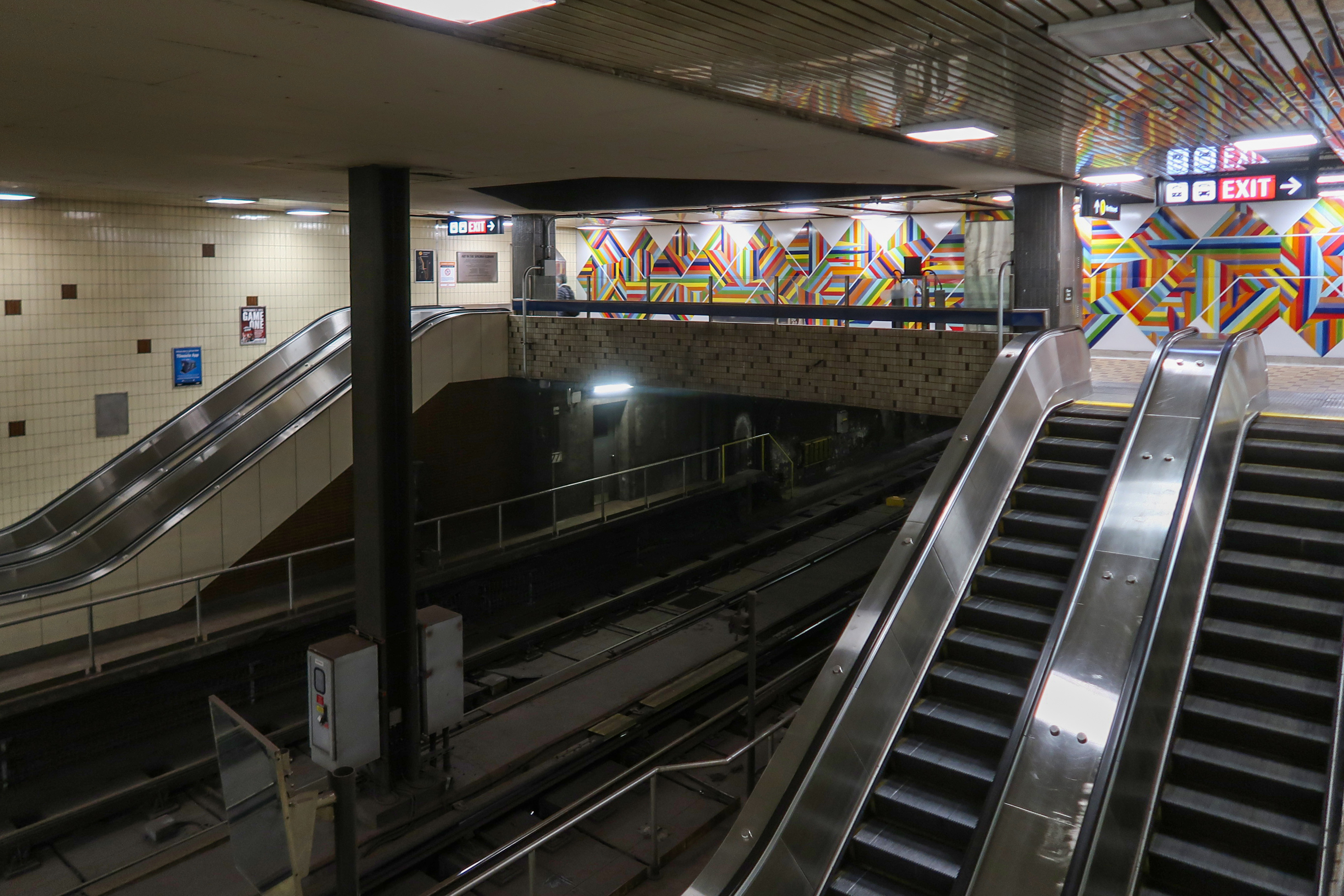
Tempo, a mural by Gordon Rayner, at St. Clair West station

Despite the project's approval, the City of Toronto refused to hand over land needed for the extension and declared some homes required to be demolished along the route historic sites, threatening a delay as contracts had already been awarded. At the time, the city wanted the TTC to move St. Clair West station further east but the TTC denied their request. In late October 1974, the City of Toronto agreed to let the TTC demolish the homes. Construction on the line had started earlier that year.

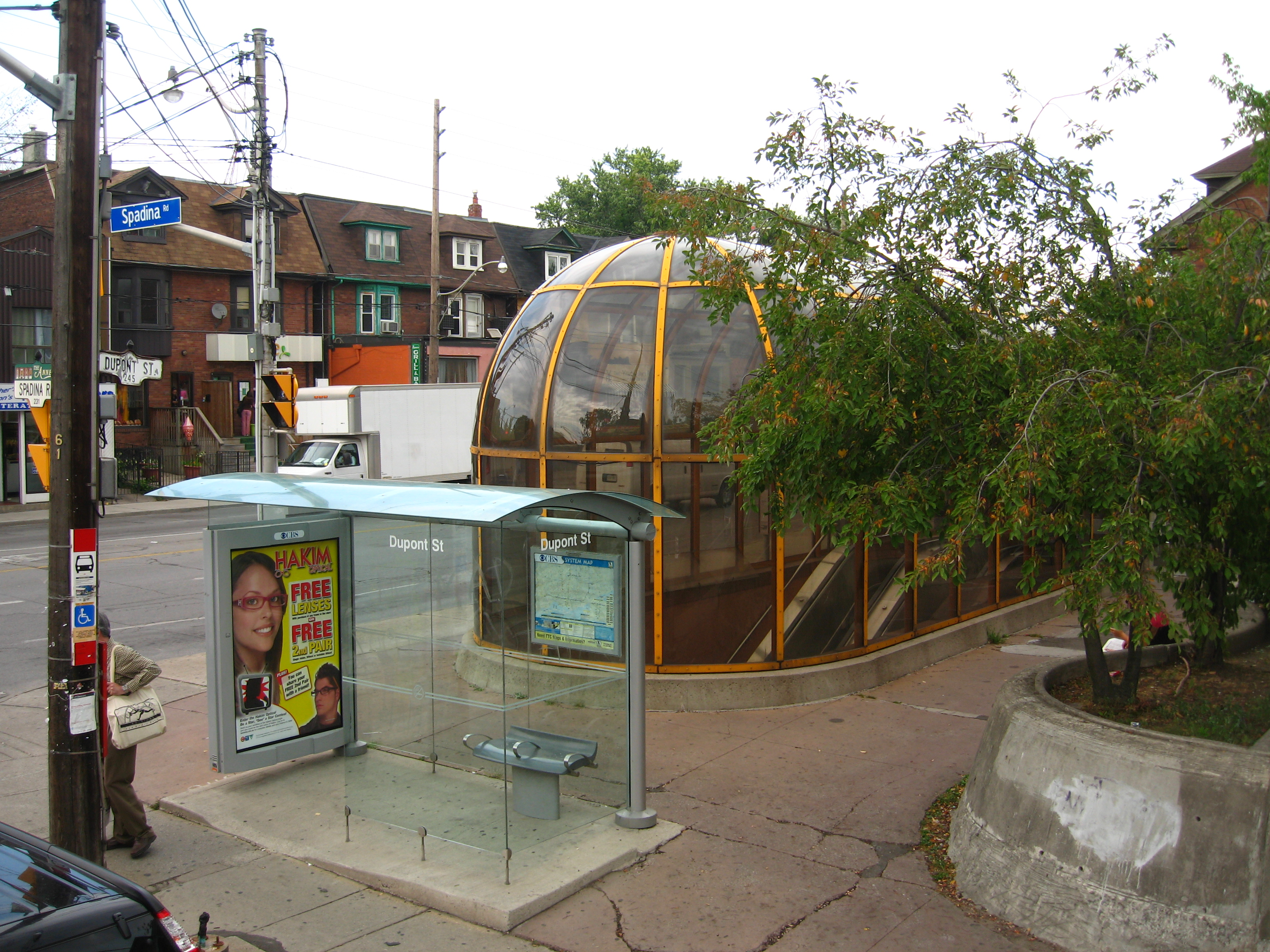
Northwest entrance of Dupont station

To facilitate construction of the line, lane restrictions were implemented on Spadina Road between Bloor Street and Dupont Street and Spadina Road was closed just north of Dupont Street. The road was given temporary decking and would be restored in 1976. Tunnelling was finished by the end of 1975 and major structural work was nearly complete by April 1976. In September 1975, the project's estimated cost surged 42 percent to $220 million. The increase was mostly blamed on inflation, though $10 million of the increase was caused by design changes. Completion was nearly delayed six months due to budget cuts in January 1976, but an agreement between Metro Toronto and the Ontario government prevented such a delay from occurring.

The construction of Eglinton West station (later renamed Cedarvale station) was slowed significantly due to a mid-1976 strike. To avoid delaying the line's opening, the possibility of opening the line without Eglinton West being serviced was proposed within the TTC in March 1977. The TTC preferred to increase the construction budget to ensure the line would still open on time, but the opening was not delayed at the time. However, a 1977 electrical workers' strike forced the opening of the line to be delayed: first to November 1977 then later to January 1978. Due to the strike, a 3.5-hour test of the line used a diesel locomotive rather than the subway's electric power.

To provide enough service on the Spadina line and future extensions of the Bloor–Danforth line, the TTC ordered 134 subway cars at a cost of $66 million in July 1975. By the line's completion, its cost had decreased to $215 million.

== Opening and operation ==
The Spadina line was officially opened on January 27, 1978, by Premier of Ontario William G. Davis, with passenger service beginning the day after. Initially, all off-peak trains ran the full length of the extension while half of rush-hour trains ended at St. Clair West station, with the other half making the full journey to Wilson. The TTC offered free rides and souvenirs along the Spadina line until 5 p.m. on opening day. The artists who made the line's public art were present and trains were crowded until midafternoon. The line operated slower than expected initially, but the Toronto Star found the subway saved 11 minutes despite a 10-minute delay. Passengers also noted faster journeys upon the line's opening. Also concurrent with the opening of the extension, the University segment of Line 1, which had previously closed after 9:30 p.m. and did not operate on Sundays, began operating during the same hours as the rest of the system.

The first few months of the line's operation were plagued by delays and vibrations affecting nearby homes. The line was found to have lightened the passenger load of the Yonge line. However, ridership growth levelled off by mid-1978 at levels just over half of what the TTC was expecting. Advertising the line to commuters using the adjacent Allen Road, which had already been under consideration, was recommended and implemented in mid-1978. While TTC general manager Michael Warren felt the signs were successful in attracting riders, the line continued to be under-used in the coming years. In 1989, the line was operating 20 percent below capacity during rush hours.

In 1991, all afternoon trains began serving the entire line to Wilson station, with short turns at St. Clair West only remaining in effectd during the morning peak. In September 2016, the short-turn location was moved to Glencairn station. In 2020, the short turns during the morning rush hour were eliminated, ending scheduled short-turn service on the line.

Following the Spadina line's opening, the Yonge–University line became known as the Yonge–University–Spadina line. The Spadina section continued to be referred to as the Spadina line, including later extensions to it.

== Extension to Downsview ==
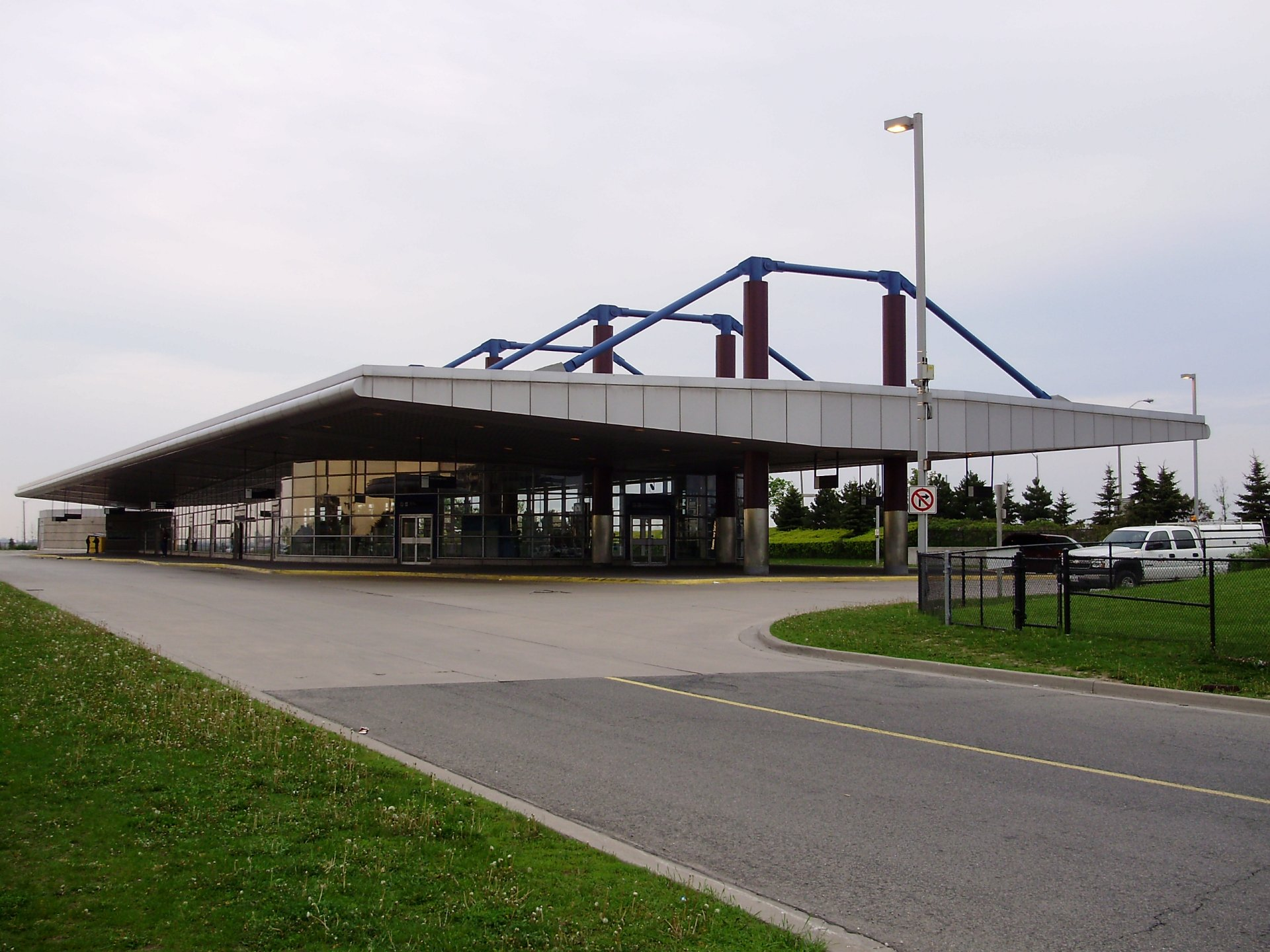
Downsview station, renamed Sheppard West station in 2017

During the line's opening ceremony in 1978, North York mayor Mel Lastman voiced his support for extending it to Finch Avenue.

In 1987, the Ontario government and Metropolitan Toronto began considering an extension of the Spadina branch from Wilson to York University. Lastman felt it could help create a second downtown for North York. A group of local and provincial politicians from Vaughan and North York, including Ontario minister of Labour Greg Sorbara, wanted the plan to go farther, extending the route to the proposed Highway 407 in Vaughan. A plan was additionally considered to extend the branch as a Sheppard route to Scarborough, though this was opposed by Scarborough politicians. The Ontario government's transport plan released in May 1988 listed an extension to York University as a long-term plan. However, they committed that November to extending the line from Wilson to Sheppard Avenue, which would allow for either plan to be built.

In April 1989, the Ontario government approved the extension to Sheppard Avenue, expecting construction to start in 1991. It was expected to cost $159 million at the time but not generate significant new ridership. There was still debate over what to do next, with the province supporting the extension to York University while the TTC preferred to curve the extension east to interline with a later phase of the proposed Sheppard Line (which was only approved with a western terminus at what was then Sheppard station on the Yonge line). Later that year, a new proposal to loop the Yonge–University–Spadina line via a power transmission corridor north of Finch Avenue began being considered. However, Lastman disapproved of the plan, preferring to build the Sheppard line instead. The plan made it onto the Ontario government's "Let's Move" transportation plan, which would be expanded under Premier Bob Rae the following year. Rae's government, however, considered looping the line at Steeles Avenue. The preferred plan would see the extension end at Steeles Avenue, which would allow service to York University.

The extension of the line to Sheppard was delayed due to objections from York University, which wanted to prevent the loop plan from being built. The extension would be approved again in 1992 and construction began that same year, with the station built on a north–south alignment as the plan to interline it with the Sheppard line had been dropped by this time. The tunnel would be entirely covered. The extension to the new Downsview station at Sheppard Avenue opened on March 29, 1996, at a cost of $117 million, significantly less than the $185 million expected when construction started. The extension was opened as expected in the second quarter of 1996. The planned extension to York University was voted down by Metropolitan Toronto in February 1995.

In 2014, the aforementioned assignment of line numbers to TTC subway lines was carried out, with the Yonge–University–Spadina line becoming Line 1, with the TTC also removing Spadina from the line's name, referring to it as Line 1 Yonge–University.

== Toronto–York Spadina subway extension ==
In 2000, the City of Toronto and York Region instead proposed an extension of the line into Vaughan after further lobbying by Vaughan politicians. The TTC determined there were insufficient projected population densities to justify extending the line north of Steeles Avenue, and the area was noted for being surrounded by big-box stores. However, provincial funding for the extension required it to reach the future Vaughan Metropolitan Centre. The TTC had already finalized the planned alignment of an extension to York University in 2005. Construction started on the six-station extension in 2008. At the time, it was expected to open in late 2014 or early 2015 and cost $2.6 billion, up from a projected $2.09 billion in 2006. Tunnel boring began in June 2011 and was completed in November 2013. The projected completion was delayed to 2016 and then to 2017 due to various issues. In 2015, the TTC hired a new contractor to complete the project. The extension ultimately opened on December 17, 2017, to Vaughan Metropolitan Centre station at Highway 7 at a cost of $3.2 billion.

== Station renamings ==
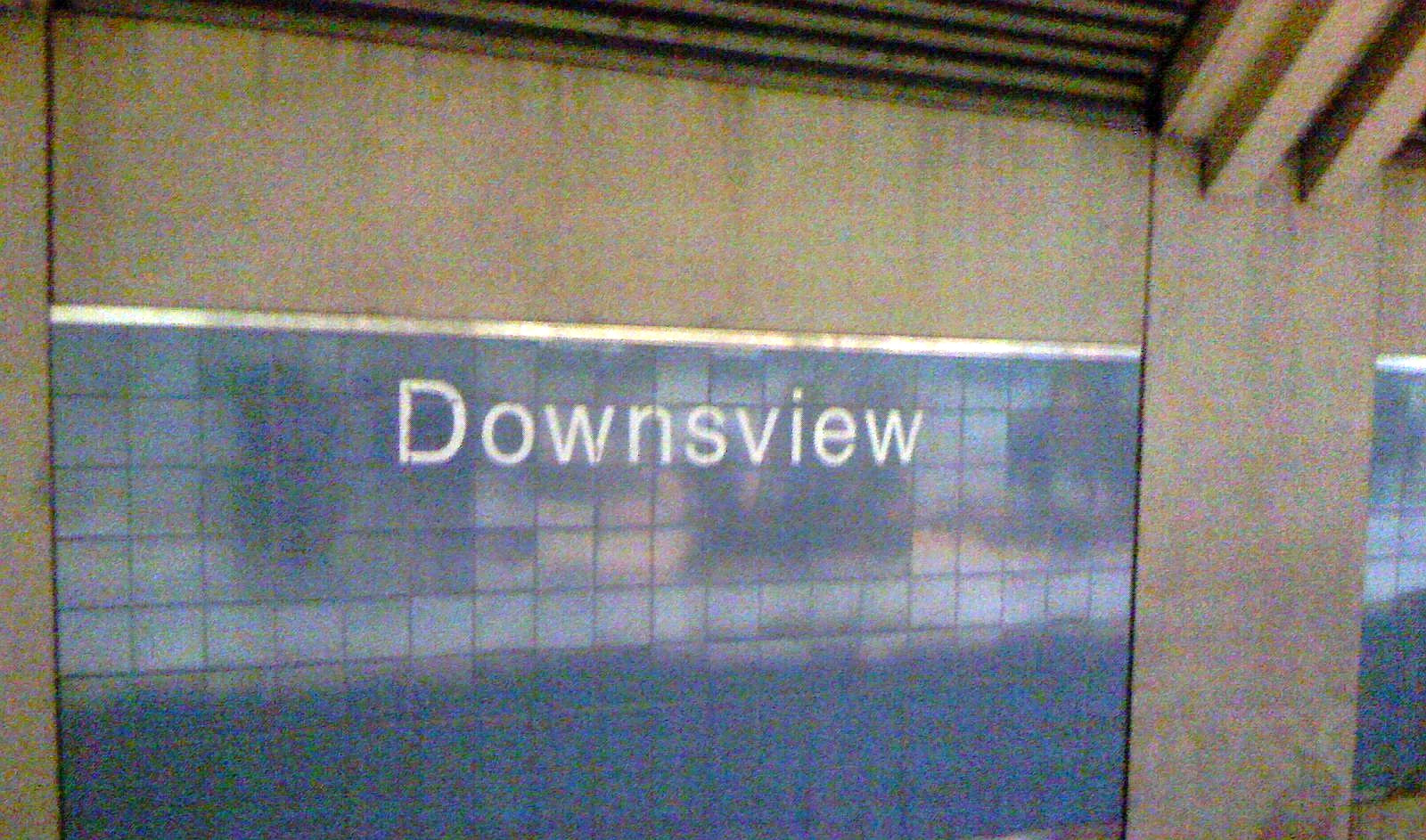
The former Downsview station name at Sheppard West station in mixed-case lettering on the platform

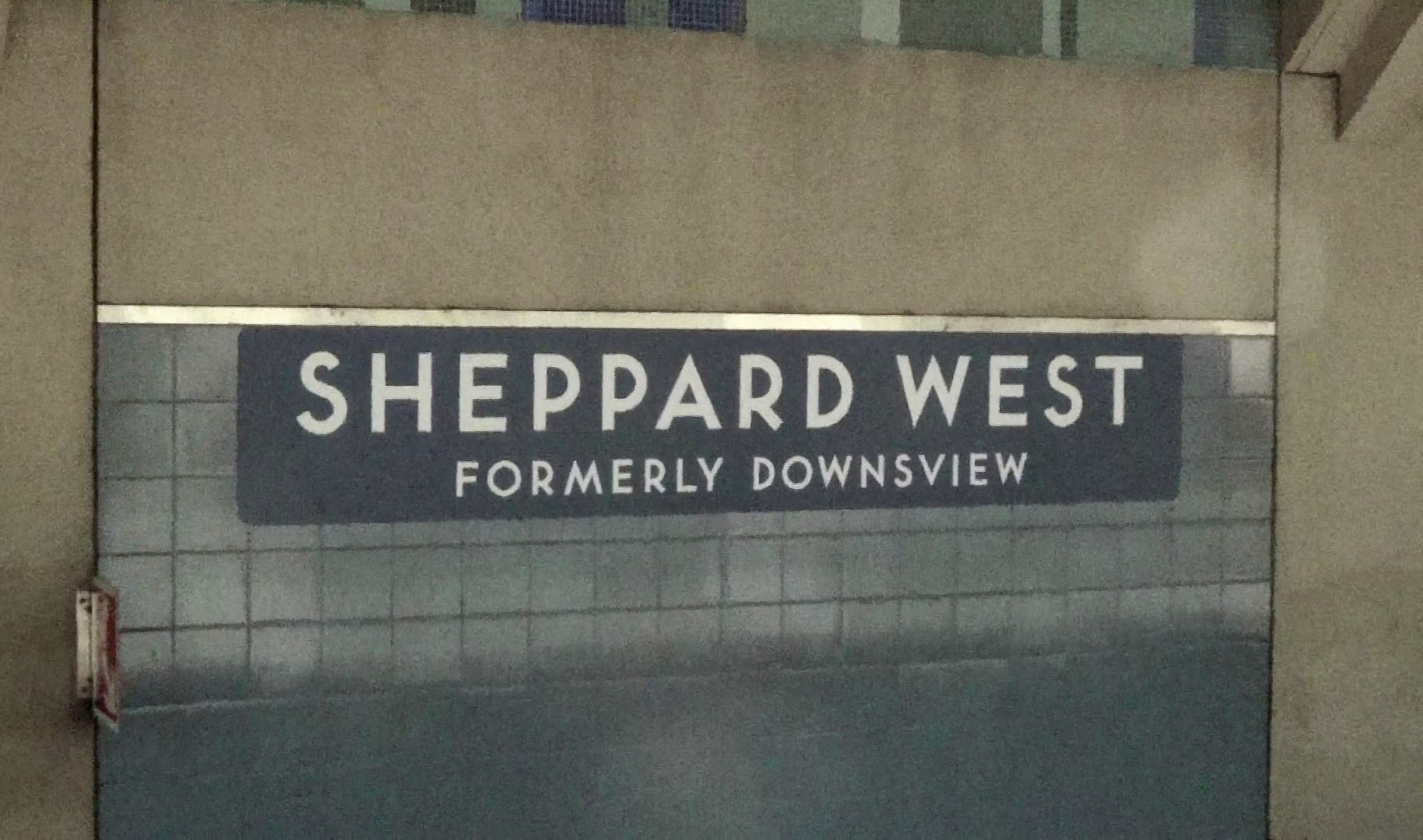
The station name in uppercase lettering using the Toronto subway typeface with "formerly Downsview" below after being renamed in 2017

Two stations on the Spadina subway line have been renamed since it opened:

- Downsview station was renamed Sheppard West on May 7, 2017, in preparation for the opening of the adjacent Downsview Park station on the TYSSE later that year, as the TTC felt the name Downsview did not accurately reflect the station's location and would mislead passengers into thinking Downsview Park was easily accessible from the station, when in actuality, the upcoming northern station would offer a more direct connection to the park. The display of the original name on the platform walls was unique in the system as it was rendered in mixed-case lettering. The Shepaprd West name is rendered in all-uppercase lettering using the Toronto Subway typeface with smaller text at the bottom acknowledging the previous name. The new name is printed on a placard placed atop the previous name.
- Eglinton West station was renamed Cedarvale on December 7, 2025, shortly before the opening of Line 5 Eglinton in 2026 to avoid confusion with Eglinton station on the Yonge line and on Line 5.
