= Yonge subway extension =

Yonge subway extension may refer to either of two northward extensions of the Yonge branch of the Toronto subway's Line 1 Yonge–University:

- Yonge North subway extension (YNSE), an extension under construction as of 2026 from Finch station to Richmond Hill
- Yonge subway extension (1974), an extension from Eglinton to Finch station in North York
