= YSE =

YSE may refer to:

- Squamish Airport (IATA: YSE), an airport in British Columbia, Canada
- Yale School of the Environment, a professional school of Yale University
- FouseyTube, a Palestinian-American YouTuber and online streamer

== See also ==
- Yonge subway extension (disambiguation), northward extensions of Line 1 Yonge–University of the Toronto subway
