= Michael Hayden =

Michael Hayden may refer to:

- Michael Hayden (artist) (born 1943), Canadian artist
- Mike Hayden (born 1944), Kansas governor
- Michael Hayden (general) (born 1945), former National Security Agency (NSA) director, former CIA director
- Michael R. Hayden (born 1951), Canadian physician, geneticist and scientific researcher
- Michael Hayden (actor) (born 1963), American stage and television actor

== See also ==
- Michael Haydn (1737–1806), Austrian composer
- Mike Heydon (1874–1913), American baseball player
