= Yonge North subway extension =

Under construction subway extension to Richmond Hill, Ontario

- Launch shaft for the extension south of Highway 407, with the tunnel boring machines being assembled in October 2026

Overview
- Status: Under construction
- Owner: Metrolinx
- Locale: Toronto, Markham, Vaughan, and Richmond Hill, Ontario
- Stations: 5

Service
- Type: Rapid transit
- System: Toronto subway
- Operator: Toronto Transit Commission

Technical
- Line length: 8 km (5 mi)
- Track gauge: 4 ft 10 7/8 in (1,495 mm) Toronto gauge

The Yonge North subway extension (YNSE) is an extension of the eastern branch of the Toronto subway's Line 1 Yonge–University north of Finch station to Richmond Hill in York Region, Ontario. The 8-kilometre (5-mile) extension will add five new stations – three underground and two at surface level – and had an estimated cost of $5.6 billion as of 2021.

The three underground stations will be located on Yonge Street at Steeles Avenue, Clark Avenue, and Royal Orchard Boulevard, respectively. North of Royal Orchard, the line will curve east then turn back north and emerge above ground to run parallel to GO Transit's Richmond Hill line. The two surface-level stations will be situated along the railway corridor. One of these – Bridge station, located underneath adjacent overpasses carrying Highway 7 and Highway 407 – will serve as a key intermodal hub, connecting with York Region Transit (YRT) and GO buses and offering direct access to the existing Langstaff GO Station, with the terminal station located a short distance to the north at High Tech Road. Preliminary construction work began in 2023, with the tunnelling contract awarded in 2025.

Originally, a 7.4-kilometre (4.6 mi) extension was conceived with six fully underground stations: Cummer/Drewry, Steeles, Clark, Royal Orchard, Langstaff/Longbridge, and Richmond Hill Centre. While first priced at $5.6 billion in 2017, the cost for this fully underground version had increased to $9.3 billion by 2021, necessitating the reduction in scope that led to the five-station plan.

Expected to take a decade to complete, the YNSE aims to reduce traffic congestion by eliminating an estimated 2,500 daily bus trips along its corridor. It is forecast to serve 94,000 daily riders and, by 2031, carry 58 million annual passengers. York Region anticipates that the extension will generate 31,000 jobs.

== Background of Line 1 extensions ==
Line 1 Yonge–University opened in 1954 between Eglinton and Union stations and was extended multiple times in the following decades. The first extension, opened in 1963, was the first leg of the western branch, running from Union below University Avenue to terminate at Bloor and St. George Streets. In the early 1970s, the Yonge branch was extended north of Eglinton as a two-phase project, reaching York Mills Road in 1973 and Finch Avenue in 1974. In 1978, an eight-stop extension of the western branch opened, running partially below Allen Road and terminating at Wilson Avenue.

In 1989, the Network 2011 plan proposed a loop that would connect the western and eastern branches via the hydro corridor north of Finch Avenue. However, officials from York University and York Region lobbied for the loop to run through the university campus and along Steeles Avenue, arguing that it would better serve commuters. While a one-station extension of the western branch to Sheppard Avenue was opened in 1996, the loop plan was abandoned after the City of Vaughan lobbied in 2000 for a northward extension to facilitate the development of Vaughan Metropolitan Centre. In its place, the Toronto–York Spadina subway extension was built, opening in December 2017.

== History of YNSE ==
Schematic map of the Yonge North extension

In 2001, the Toronto Transit Commission (TTC) completed a rapid transit expansion study, which showed that an extension of the Yonge subway to Highway 7 in Richmond Hill, had "significant long term potential". However, the study also noted that an extension could cause overcrowding on the existing line south of Bloor–Yonge station.

In 2002, York Region published a transportation master plan, which included north–south rapid transit on Yonge Street, connecting Newmarket to the Yonge subway. In 2006, work began on the environmental assessment for an extension of the Yonge subway to York Region. In June 2007, the Ontario government pledged funding towards the YNSE as part of its MoveOntario 2020 rapid transit growth network.

In January 2009, Toronto City Council approved the YNSE in principle, provided there were upgrades to support the additional ridership on Line 1 Yonge–University as a result of the extension, such as the construction of the Downtown Relief line and automatic train control. Politicians noted that in the morning rush hours, southbound trains on the Yonge line usually reach capacity between York Mills and Eglinton stations.

In April 2009, the environmental assessment for the extension was approved. The plan was for a 6.8-kilometre (4.2-mile) extension that was to have six new underground stations (Cummer/Drewry, Steeles, Clark, Royal Orchard, Langstaff/Longbridge, and Richmond Hill Centre), bus terminals at Steeles and Richmond Hill Centre stations, a bus loop at Cummer/Drewry station and commuter parking at Langstaff/Longbridge. The TTC estimated that the extension would cost around $2.4 billion to build. In 2012, a YSNE design report suggested eliminating Royal Orchard station from the project due to low ridership projections. Royal Orchard was estimated to have around two-thirds lower ridership than Bessarion on Line 4 Sheppard, the least-used station on the subway system at the time.

In November 2014, an addendum to the environmental assessment was approved to include an underground train storage facility and surface facilities. The City of Toronto and the TTC expected that the provincial government would pay for construction of the extension, and that the increase in operating costs would "be at no cost to the City of Toronto".

In March 2016, York Region officials stated their belief that SmartTrack, electrified GO service, the Spadina subway extension and automatic train control would be implemented by 2026, sufficient to support the extra ridership of an extension to Richmond Hill. Thus, the deputy mayor of Richmond Hill wanted to start construction of the extension by 2019. On June 2, 2016, the provincial government allocated $55 million to Metrolinx in order to work with the TTC and York Region on a detailed plan for the subway extension. In May 2017, Toronto mayor John Tory announced that he would not support planning for the YNSE unless a funding commitment was made for the Relief Line, intended to alleviate overcrowding on Line 1.

In April 2019, Metrolinx announced that they would be proceeding with the YNSE at an estimated cost of $5.6 billion. It was to open after the Ontario Line (a subway project proposed by Metrolinx that superseded the Relief Line proposal), which was expected to improve capacity constraints on Line 1 Yonge–University. Work to design the extension began, with $36 million contributed by York Region.

In May 2021, the Government of Canada pledged $26.8 billion to rapid transit projects in the Greater Toronto Area, with $5.6 billion going towards the YNSE.

In February 2023, preliminary works began at Finch station, allowing for easier construction of the extension in future. In August 2025, it was announced that the TTC planned to purchase 70 new subway trains from Alstom, with some of these trains to be deployed along Line 1 intended for use by the YNSE while the remaining trains were to be deployed along Line 2 amid that line's extension.

=== Revised plan ===
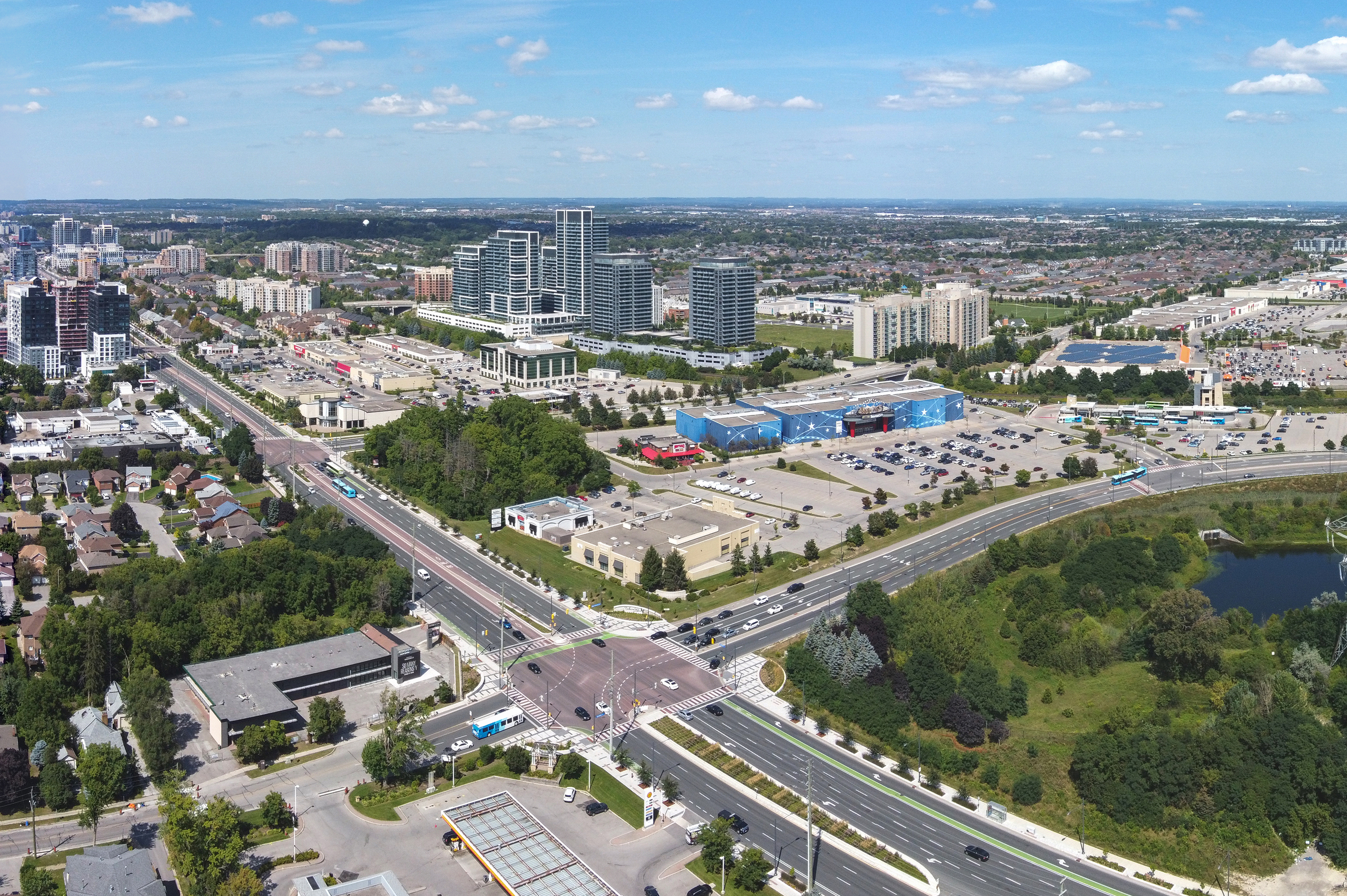
The vicinity of the extension's terminus in Richmond Hill

In March 2021, the Ontario government announced plans to scale back the YNSE to reduce its costs, which had increased to an estimated $9.3 billion. Key changes included cutting the number of stations from six to four and shifting sections of the line to the surface. One of three stations – Cummer, Clark, or Royal Orchard – was targeted for elimination, which was expected to save $400–500 million. The two northernmost stations, Langstaff/Longbridge and Richmond Hill Centre, were to be replaced by two surface stations, Bridge and High Tech.

In May 2021, the federal government announced that $10.4 billion would be invested in rapid transit projects in the Greater Toronto Area, with the YNSE receiving around $2.2 billion in federal funding.

Also eliminated was the planned replacement of the Yonge Street bridge over the East Don River, which dips into its valley, with a higher double-deck span that would carry subway trains on its lower deck in the same manner as the Prince Edward Viaduct carries Line 2 Bloor–Danforth trains over the wider and deeper valley of the Don River proper; the new plan has the line simply being tunnelled under the river and retains the existing bridge.

This change also resulted in a revision of the originally planned direct route under Yonge Street to Richmond Hill Centre to one veering east at Royal Orchard Boulevard and then turning back north and surfacing to run along the Canadian National / GO rail corridor to the new Bridge station location. This meant the line would now run underneath homes in the Royal Orchard neighbourhood in Thornhill, a district straddling the limits of the cities of Markham and Vaughan along Yonge Street. This angered residents, who were concerned about noise and vibrations from subway trains passing under their homes. A protest – attended by politicians such as Markham's deputy mayor and York Regional councillor Don Hamilton, Markham councillor Keith Irish, and Thornhill member of Parliament Peter Kent – was held on September 17, 2021, demanding the subway be routed back under Yonge Street. To address the issue, Metrolinx adjusted the new route by running it under Bay Thorn Drive to reduce the number of houses the line would pass under from 40 to 20 and increased the tunnel depth to a minimum of 21 metres (69 ft).

In July 2021, Ontario officials confirmed that the YNSE would include a station at Clark Avenue. In January 2022, the inclusion of a station at Royal Orchard Boulevard was also confirmed. This station was to be funded by revenues related to the intensification of the surrounding area as a transit-oriented community.

=== Procurement ===
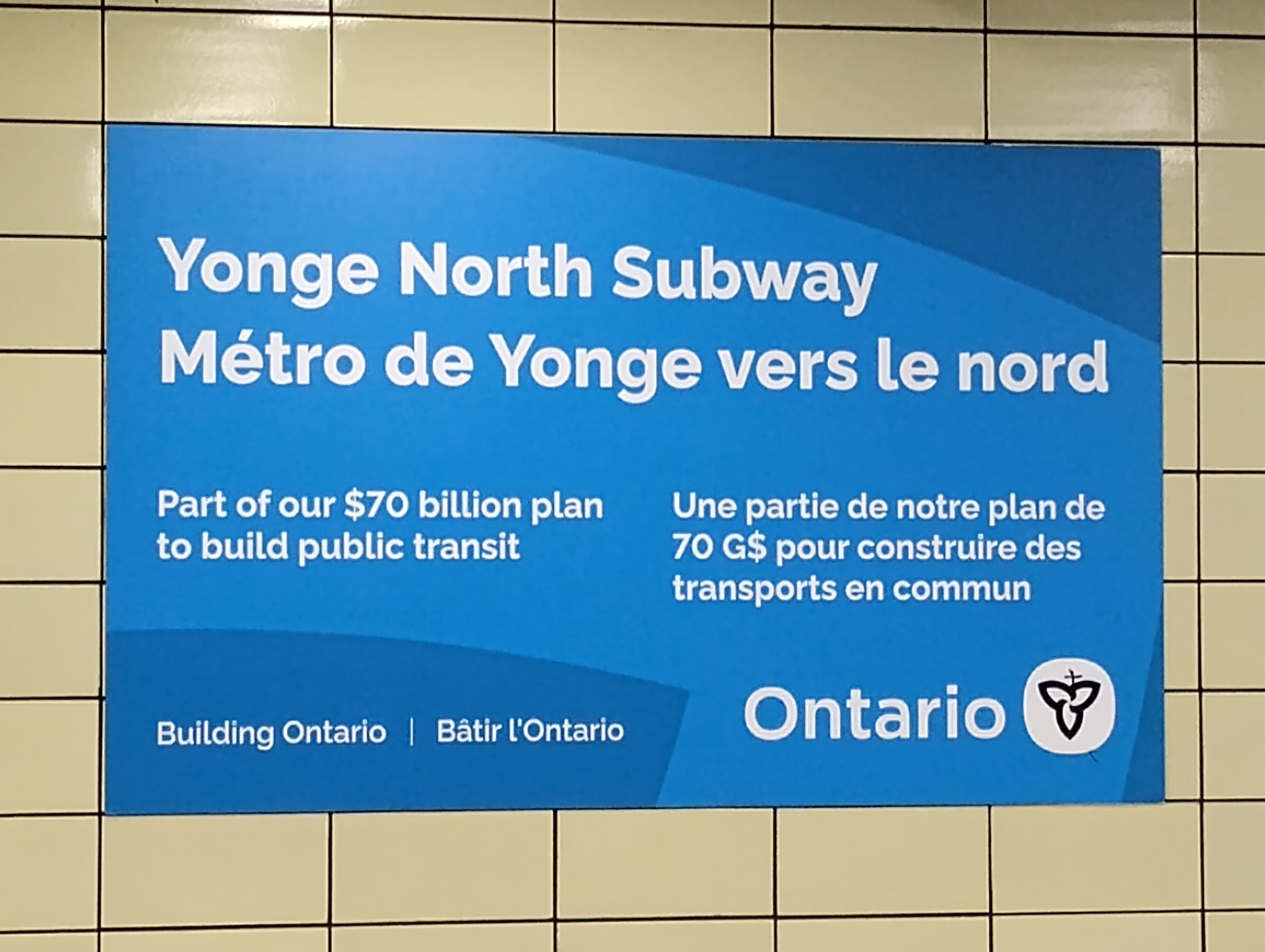
Yonge North subway extension project sign at Finch station

The Yonge North subway extension consists of two primary contracts. To expedite construction, tunnelling will begin first, followed by a separate contract to build the stations, rail, and systems.

==== Advance tunnel ====
On April 27, 2023, Infrastructure Ontario and Metrolinx issued a request for qualifications (RFQ) for the advance tunnel contract, marking the first phase of procurement for the Yonge North subway extension.

This contract includes:

- the design and construction of a 6.3-kilometre (3.9 mi) tunnel from the existing Finch station to a portal south of Highway 407
- the design and construction of launch and extraction shafts, tunnels, as well as headwalls for stations and support of excavation for emergency exit buildings
- the design, procurement, and supply of tunnel-boring machines and tunnel liner segments
- the reinforcement and improvement of soil and works necessary to facilitate tunnelling under and next to the CN Railway tracks and the York–Durham sewage system
- the construction of CN right-of-way separation barriers to expedite safe corridor access and construction

On December 1, 2023, Infrastructure Ontario and Metrolinx released a request for proposals (RFP) for the advance tunnel contract package. Three teams were shortlisted through the RFQ process – CrossTransit Group (Vinci, Ferrovial, Sener, Janin Atlas), North End Connectors (Aecon, Dragados, Ghella, EXP, TYPSA), and Toronto–York Tunnel Connectors (Acciona, Bouygues, Hatch, Parsons) – and invited to submit proposals detailing how they would deliver the project. In August 2025, the $1.4-billion contract was awarded to North End Connectors.

==== Stations, rails and systems ====
On October 16, 2025, Infrastructure Ontario and Metrolinx issued a request for qualifications (RFQ) for the stations, rails and systems (SRS) contract. Infrastructure Ontario estimated the cost of the contract to be around $4 billion, with a contract execution date of between 2027 and 2029.

The contract will include the design, construction and commissioning of:

- five new subway stations, bus loops and emergency exits
- track, power, signalling and other mechanical and electrical systems
- a new train storage facility
- integration with the existing Line 1 service

== Construction ==
The southeast site of Steeles station in October 2026, with construction hoarding advertising the subway extension

In the second quarter of 2026, commercial buildings at the southeast corner of Yonge Street and Steeles Avenue were demolished, as was a former Hudson's Bay location at Centerpoint Mall at the southwest corner beginning that June, to make way for Steeles station and for the temporary diversion of Yonge Street to accommodate the construction.

Construction of the extension itself began in mid-2026 south of Highway 407 with the excavation of the launch shaft for the two tunnel boring machines (TBMs) that will dig the tunnels. The TBMs were built in Germany and were shipped to Canada by sea. The first TBM segments were lowered into the launch shaft in October 2026.

== Busway ==
Given the wait for the Richmond Hill extension, there were plans to construct Viva (YRT's bus rapid transit operations) bus lanes along Yonge Street from Finch Avenue to Highway 7. However, by April 2014, the plan was scrapped in favour of only constructing the busway north of Highway 7. A group in York Region had lobbied for the plan's cancellation due to concerns about a loss of treed boulevards and private property when widening Yonge Street for bus lanes through Thornhill. The revised busway, known as the Yonge Street Rapidway, opened in December 2020.
