= Claude Breeze =

Canadian painter (born 1938)

- Born: Claude Herbert Breeze; October 9, 1938 (age 87); Nelson, British Columbia, Canada
- Education: education and early art training in Saskatoon, Saskatchewan with Ernest Lindner; Regina College with Arthur McKay, Ronald Bloore, Roy Kiyooka and Ken Lochhead; Emily Carr University of Art and Design (1959)
- Known for: painter, sculptor, installation artist
- Awards: Queen`s Jubilee Medal (1978)
- Elected: Member in 1974, Royal Canadian Academy of Arts

Claude Breeze RCA, also known as Claude Herbert Breeze, and sometimes as C. Herbert (born October 9, 1938) is a Canadian figurative painter, known for paintings with raw, unsettling imagery. He is a Professor Emeritus at York University in Toronto, Ontario.

== Biography ==
Breeze had his first one-person show in 1965 in Vancouver when he showed his Lovers in a Landscape series. It received much acclaim: the Vancouver Sun compared him with Francis Bacon. These fourteen paintings in the series have naked figures in some sort of combination to strip the skin off the sick 1960s, the artist said. His Sunday Afternoon (from an old American Photograph) (1965, Department of External Affairs Collection) was featured in the first issue of arts/Canada in January 1967 by editor Barry Lord. In painting it, Breeze was inspired by a photograph in a University of British Columbia newspaper, The Ubyssey, of a lynching in the United States. During the 1970s, Breeze painted a variety of subjects and styles, from landscape, regarded as a landscape of signs, to abstraction. In the early 1980s, Breeze's love of martial arts and the orient led to a series of paintings and lithographs. (Each of the paintings had a wrapped weapon.) During the late 1980s and 1990s, Breeze used computer technology in his work.

Breeze has exhibited his paintings in numerous solo and group shows around the world. His work is found in public, corporate and private collections, including Canada's National Gallery of Canada. Among his works are several pieces of public art, including Spacing... Aerial Highways, a 300-foot ceramic tile mural at Lawrence West subway station in Toronto.

Breeze is a member of the Royal Canadian Academy of Arts in 1974. In 1978. he was awarded the Queen Elizabeth II's Silver Jubilee Medal in recognition of his work and his contributions to the visual arts in Canada.
