= Glencairn station =

Toronto subway station

Glencairn
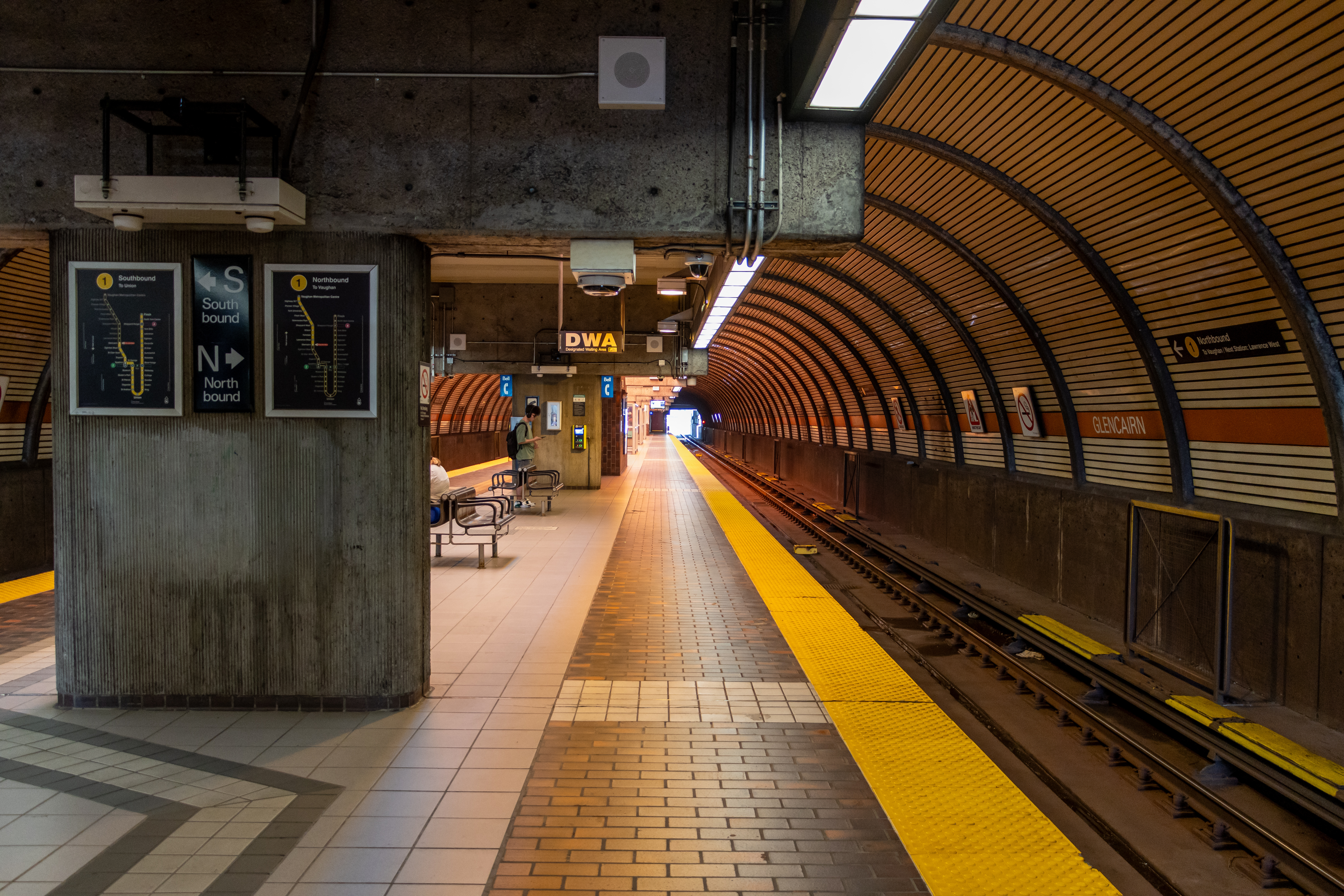

General information
- Location: 785 Glencairn Avenue; Toronto, Ontario; Canada
- Coordinates: 43°42′31″N 79°26′26″W
- Platforms: Centre platform
- Tracks: 2
- Connections: 14 Glencairn

Construction
- Structure type: At grade in highway median
- Accessible: Yes
- Architect: Adamson Associates

Other information
- Website: Official station page

History
- Opened: 28 January 1978; 48 years ago

Passengers
- 2023–2024: 5,878
- Rank: 65 of 70

Services
Preceding station	Toronto Transit Commission	Following station
Lawrence West towards Vaughan	Line 1 Yonge–University	Cedarvale towards Finch
Location

Glencairn is a subway station on Line 1 Yonge–University in Toronto, Ontario, Canada. It is located in the median of William R. Allen Road at Glencairn Avenue.

== History ==
Glencairn station opened in 1978 in what was then the Borough of North York. It was part of the subway line extension from St. George to Wilson station.

In the late 1960s and early 1970s, a station at Glencairn Avenue and Yonge Street was considered for an extension of Line 1 north along Yonge but dropped due to budgetary limitations. Had this station been built, it would have been located between Eglinton and Lawrence stations.

As part of the Easier Access program, construction began in 2022 to add elevators to the centre platform, which connects to the street-level concourse. Construction was completed on 1 October 2024.

== Station description ==
Glencairn station was constructed at ground level within the median of Allen Road, between the Glencairn Avenue and Viewmount Avenue bridges.

Glencairn Avenue, at the north end of the station, has entrances on the north and south side of the street. Here there are both up and down escalators and stairs between the centre train platform, the intermediate concourse where there is a collectors booth and turnstiles, and street level. Viewmount Avenue, at the south end of the station, only has stairs to an automatic entrance on the north side of the street. There are elevators connecting the street-level concourse to the centre platform.

== Architecture and art ==
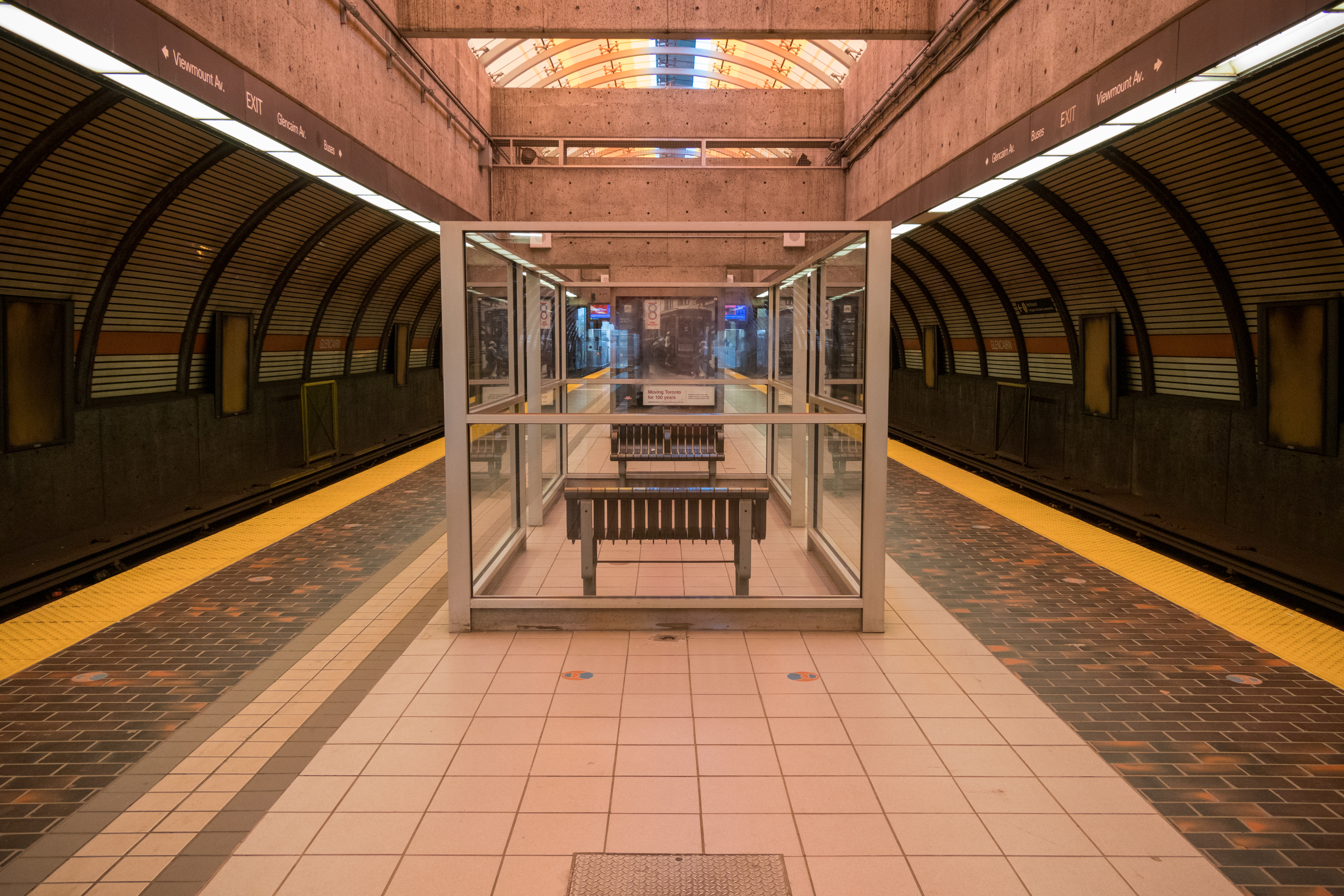
The artwork Joy in the skylight casts a pink glow.

Glencairn was designed by Adamson Associates. A central vaulted glass roof spans the length of the station, allowing the penetration of natural light to all areas of the station during the day and for it to be seen at night as a long illuminated strip of light.

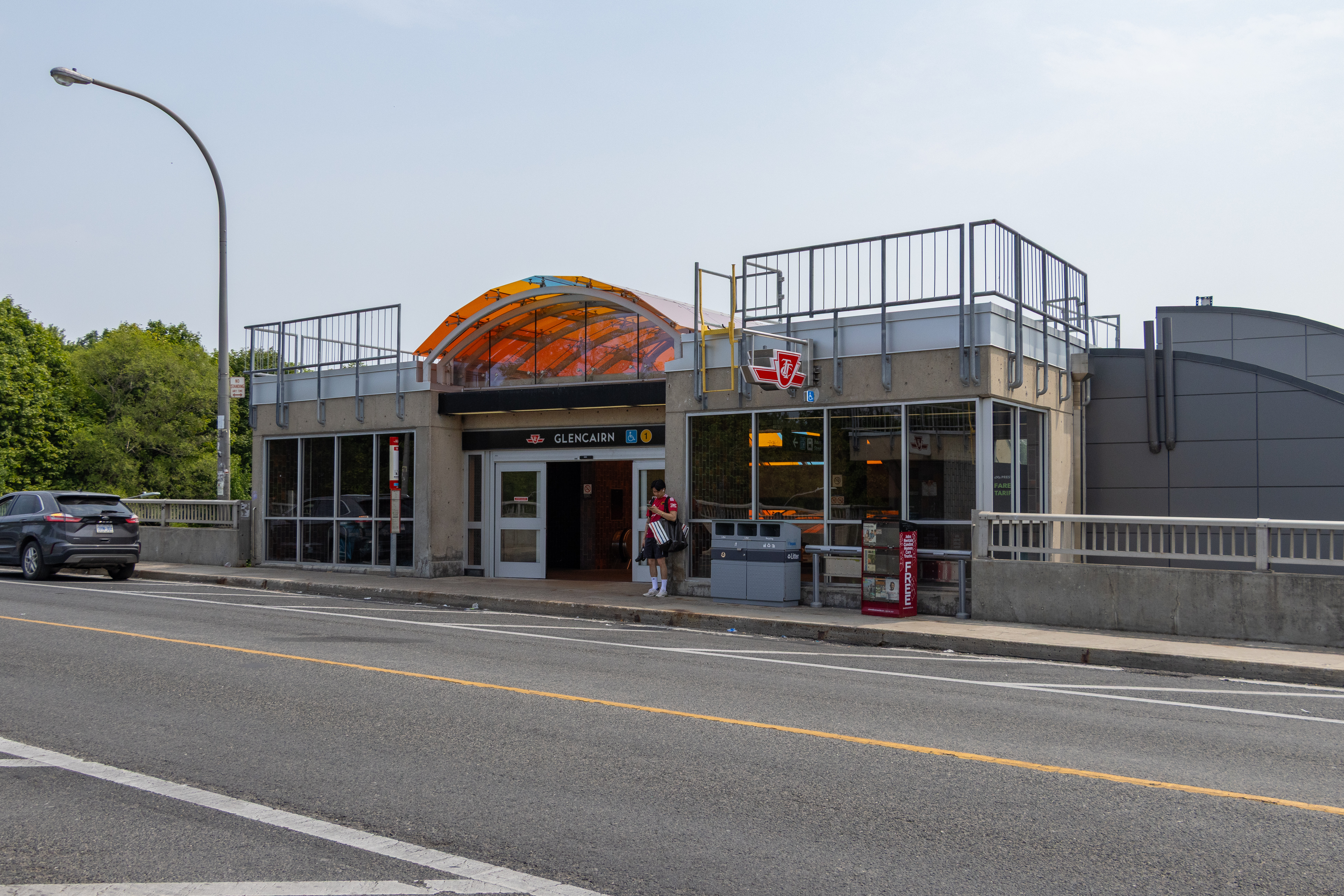
Station entrance on the south side of Glencairn Avenue

The glass roof is directly above the single centre platform. This is similar to the design of Yorkdale station, where the interior walls of the station at platform level are unfinished concrete, with curved sections over the tracks to form a lower ceiling. Unlike Yorkdale, the curve is less sudden, making the walls more rounded in appearance. They are clad with white horizontal panels between vertical concrete "ribs", along with a wider orange panel strip displaying the station name. Platform-level seating is sheltered within glass walls. Wayfinding signage is backlit. Floors and some of the walls are clad with red-brown tiles.

Glencairn features an artistic skylight entitled Joy, designed by Rita Letendre. The original iteration, installed in 1977, comprised a series of translucent acrylic panels. It was removed in the early 1990s at Letendre's request after leakage damaged the panels. The second version, installed in 2020, is a reinterpretation of the original work. It consists of art colours inserted between two glass panels.

== Surface connections ==
TTC routes serving the station include:

Route	Name	Additional information
14	Glencairn	Eastbound to Davisville station and westbound to Caledonia Road

Transfers to buses occur at curbside stops outside this station. 109 Ranee runs along Marlee Avenue one block west of Glencairn station.
