= Yonge subway extension (1974) =

Extension of Toronto subway line

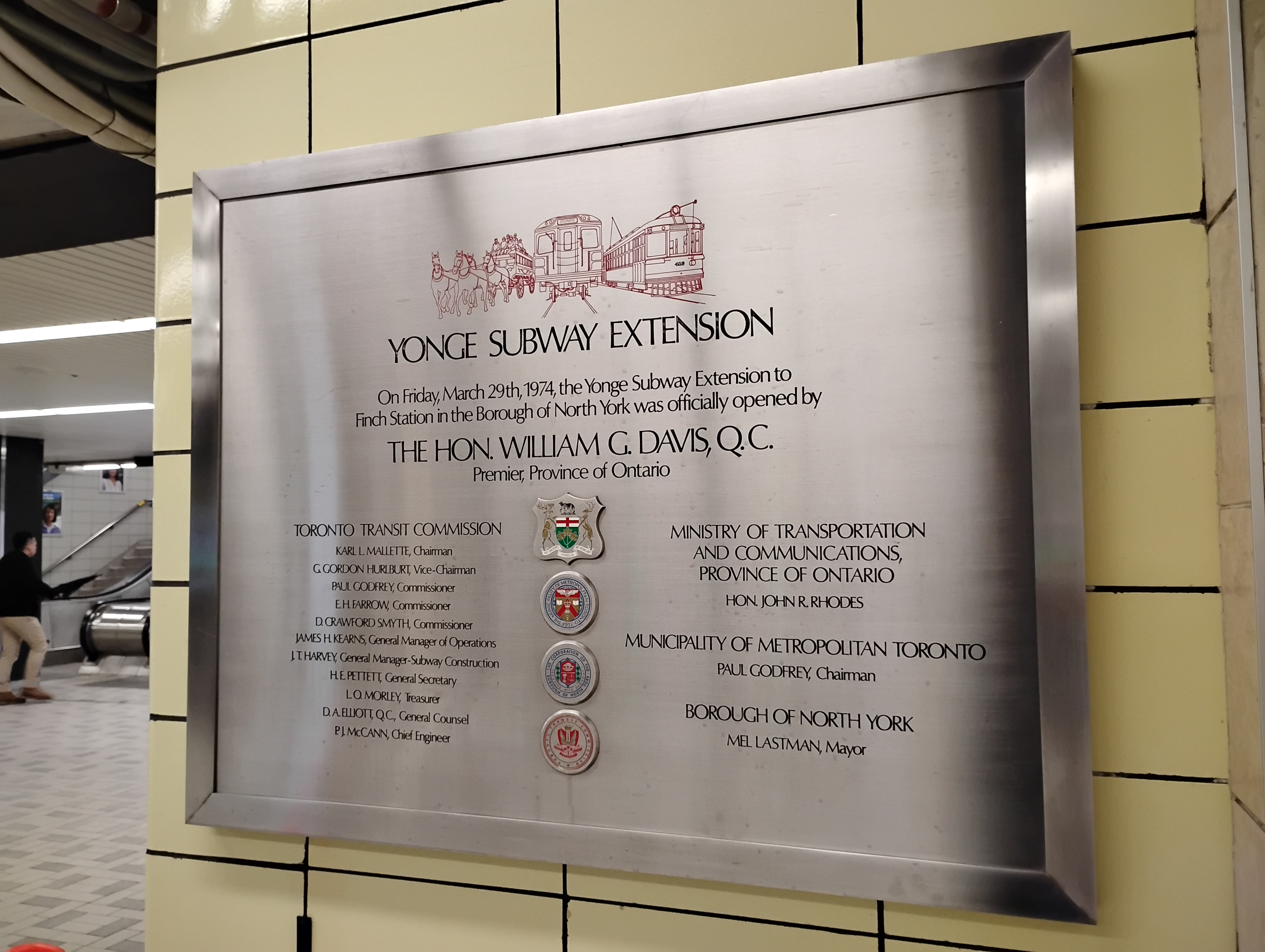
- Plaque at Finch station commemorating the opening of the Yonge subway extension

Overview
- Locale: Toronto
- Stations: 4

Service
- Type: Rapid transit
- Operator: Toronto Transit Commission

History
- Opened: March 31, 1973 (Eglinton to York Mills); March 30, 1974 (York Mills to Finch)

Technical
- Line length: 5.4 miles (8.7 km)
- Track gauge: 1,495 mm (4 ft 10 7/8 in) Toronto gauge
The Yonge subway extension highlighted on a 1974 subway system map
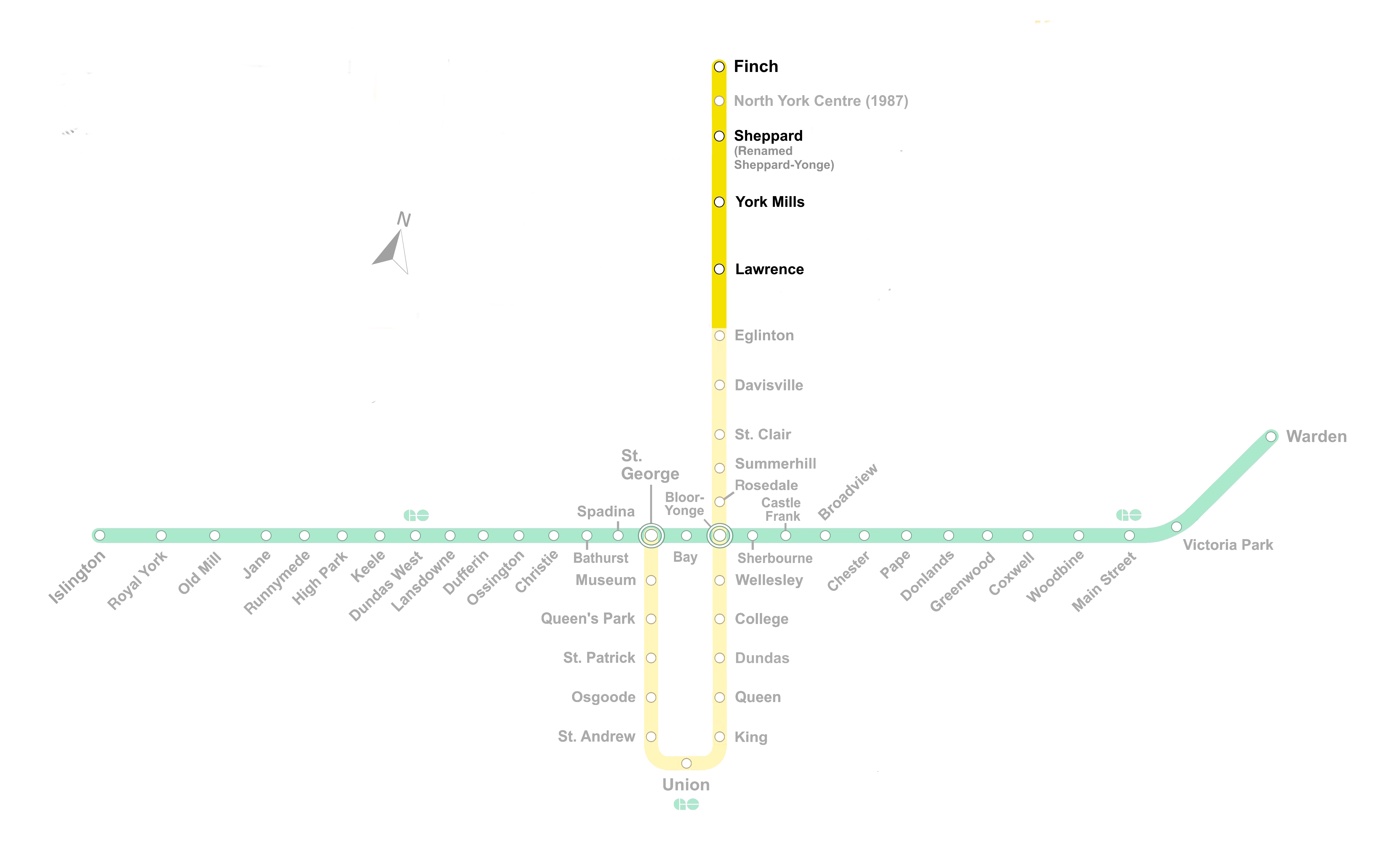

The Yonge subway extension was a Toronto Transit Commission (TTC) project in Toronto, Ontario, to extend its Yonge–University subway line 8.7 kilometres (5.4 mi) north from Eglinton station along Yonge Street. This expansion added four new stations, including its new northern terminus at Finch station.

In mid-1961, the TTC created plans to extend the Yonge line to Steeles Avenue. These plans were kept secret and an extension to Sheppard Avenue was not approved until 1965. Construction was delayed by local opposition to the initially overground route through Hoggs Hollow, with Metro Toronto approving a route under Yonge Street instead. Construction started in 1968, with the line initially expected to open to Sheppard at the end of 1971 at a cost of CA$79 million.

The line was primarily constructed by tunnelling, though the method of construction from Sheppard to Finch was changed during construction to cut-and-cover to prevent delays. Completion was delayed multiple times due to labour disputes, a 1969 decision to extend to Finch Avenue, and poor soil conditions. A 1971 strike prompted the TTC to initially open the extension to York Mills rather than to Sheppard. This section began operating in March 1973, while the remaining section to Sheppard and Finch opened in March 1974. The extension cost $135 million to build. A loop extension east from Finch station was proposed in the 1990s but ultimately shelved in favour of the Yonge North subway extension (YNSE), approved in 2021, which will extend the Yonge branch north to near Highway 407 and Highway 7 in Richmond Hill.

== Background ==
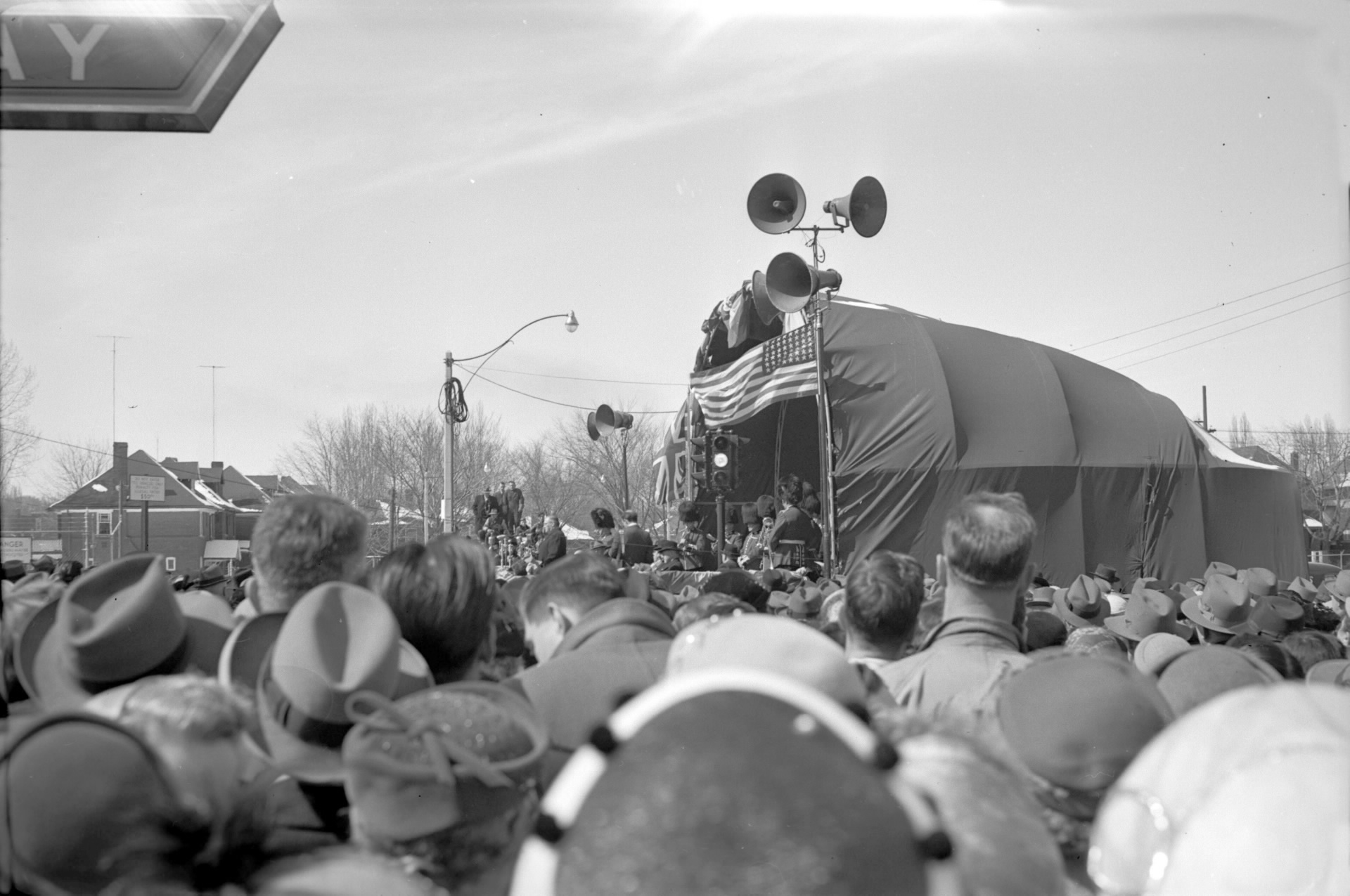
Opening ceremony for the initial section of the Yonge line outside Davisville station

The Yonge subway line first opened on March 30, 1954, running between Union and Eglinton stations. The line was extended north along University Avenue to St. George at Bloor Street in February 1963 as part of the Bloor–University subway project, creating a U-shaped Yonge–University line. The Bloor–University project also constructed the initial section of the Bloor–Danforth line, which opened in February 1966.

== Planning and design ==
Toronto subway map circa 2026 with the extension highlighted in red

In 1959, an extension of the Yonge line north to Finch Avenue was proposed to be built sometime after a line along the proposed Spadina Expressway was completed. In mid-1961, the TTC drew up a CA$63 million plan to extend the line to Steeles Avenue in two phases. However, when Alderman William Archer asked for the plan to be released, the executive committee of Metro Toronto voted to keep it secret.

In the 1960s, it was debated whether an extension on Yonge Street or one along Spadina should be implemented first, with supporters of a Spadina extension fearing overcrowding on the Yonge line if it were extended first. In 1964, a Yonge extension to Steeles was one of five projects being considered by Metro Toronto Council, along with the Spadina extension. In October 1965, Metro Toronto voted in favour of constructing a Yonge extension first, which would terminate at Sheppard Avenue despite North York and the TTC supporting an extension farther north to Steeles Avenue. Planners opposing an extension to Steeles argued it would increase urban development beyond Metro Toronto's boundaries, and the plan was ultimately cut back to Finch.

Local opposition to the originally proposed route emerged in 1966. Near Hoggs Hollow, it was planned to be built above ground west of Yonge Street, but local ratepayers' associations preferred a route closer to Yonge and students of the local Loretto Abbey school were wary of its impact on the school's grounds. The TTC preferred the elevated route due to its lower estimated cost of $57 million, later adjusted to $67.8 million. In September 1966, Metro Toronto recommended a tunnelled route under Yonge Street in agreement with locals, despite this option costing $11.2 million more. The route was approved by Metro Toronto's executive committee and council in January 1967.

In February 1968, TTC board member Ford Brand proposed extending the line farther from Sheppard Avenue to Finch Avenue after the commission found it would cost $7 to $10 million to add parking at Sheppard, while additional parking at Finch could be built on Ontario Hydro lands. TTC chair Ralph Day supported the extension. In 1968, the cost of the further extension to Finch was expected to be $22 million for a cut-and-cover option west of Yonge or $26 million for a tunnelled option below Yonge. Despite promising to make a decision by August 15, 1968, Metro Toronto did not decide to extend the line to Finch until late 1969, after construction on the extension to Sheppard had started. The tunnel option was selected. The late decision to extend the line to Finch delayed the project.

The extension included four new stations: Lawrence, York Mills, Sheppard, and Finch, all named after their respective east–west cross streets. These stations were farther apart than stations elsewhere in the subway system and local bus service would continue to run on Yonge Street after the extension was complete. An additional station was planned at Park Home Avenue during the extension's original design but was not built as part of the initial project. A proposal to make provisions for future station construction at the site was also rejected by Metro Toronto. The station was later built and opened in 1987 as North York Centre station.

South of Sheppard and excluding cut-and-cover tunnels adjacent to stations, the twin tunnels are each 4.9 metres (16 ft) in diameter with 0.6-metre (2.0 ft) concrete rings on the outside. The tunnels were the first in the Toronto subway system to feature handrails for workers on the sides of tunnels. Additionally, four emergency exits were built due to the increased spacing between stations. One such exit features a 96-metre (314 ft) horizontal tunnel to the nearby Don Valley Golf Course, designed that way to take advantage of the nearby slope down to the course and to prevent a 22-metre (72 ft) climb to the surface along Yonge Street.

== Construction ==
Each mined or bored tunnel section had its own construction contract, and there were seven contracts from Eglinton to Sheppard: one near each station for the new station and the nearby cut-and-cover tunnel and one contract for each segment of tunnel between stations. Tunnel boring machines were used between Lawrence and York Mills, and manual tunneling shields were used from Eglinton to Lawrence and from York Mills to Sheppard. The section from Sheppard to Finch was initially supposed to be bored or mined like other segments, but the TTC decided in 1970, with the support of TTC chair Ralph Day, to build a cut-and-cover tunnel there instead to control costs. The Don River was temporarily diverted to a flume above the tunnel during construction; the top of the tunnel sits 1.2 metres (4 ft) below the riverbed. The concrete in this area is much thicker to prevent the tunnel from floating in the damp soil.

Construction was originally expected to begin at the start of 1968, but the delayed completion of the Bloor–Danforth line prevented the extension's construction from starting. Additionally, local opposition to the initially proposed route delayed the extension's approval by Metro Toronto. Construction began with the start of tunnelling in October 1968. In late 1969, the extension to Sheppard Avenue was expected to cost $79 million and the cost of an additional extension to Finch had increased by $5 million. At the time, Metro Toronto had agreed to fund all but $17 million of the extension's cost, nearly half of which was to be covered by the Ontario government. It was expected to be complete around the end of 1971 despite labour disputes having disrupted work multiple times near York Mills, including at least once in 1968 due to safety concerns.

By January 1970, the extension to Sheppard was delayed again to late 1972, with the extension to Finch delayed to early 1974. Costs of the initial section to Sheppard had increased to $102.4 million due to a surge in labour costs and soil problems at two locations. The cost of the portion from Sheppard to Finch had additionally increased to $37.5 million. The portion to Sheppard was delayed again in May 1971 to the end of March 1973, with the final section to Finch opening a year later. Tunnelling was complete from Eglinton to just south of Highway 401, and construction had started on all stations except Finch. The section between York Mills and Sheppard was delayed again due to a labour dispute that had escalated to a strike by July 1971. In late 1971, while the strike was ongoing, the TTC approved initially opening the extension to York Mills, with Sheppard opening later. The strike was resolved in January 1972, but a separate months-long strike began immediately after, again delaying work.

The extension cost a total of $135 million to build, less than the $140 million estimated in 1970 but 20 percent higher than the $112 million estimated for the whole extension in 1966. Additionally, 76 new subway cars were purchased for the extension in late 1969, at a cost of $11.8 million. In early 1973, due to a shortage of subway cars when the extension opened, the TTC looked to extend its existing contract to an additional 88 subway cars to be used to relieve congestion on the existing network and to expand service both on the remainder of the extension to Finch as well as on the future Spadina branch of Line 1. The TTC placed an order for the 88 cars that May for $25.4 million.

== Opening and operation ==
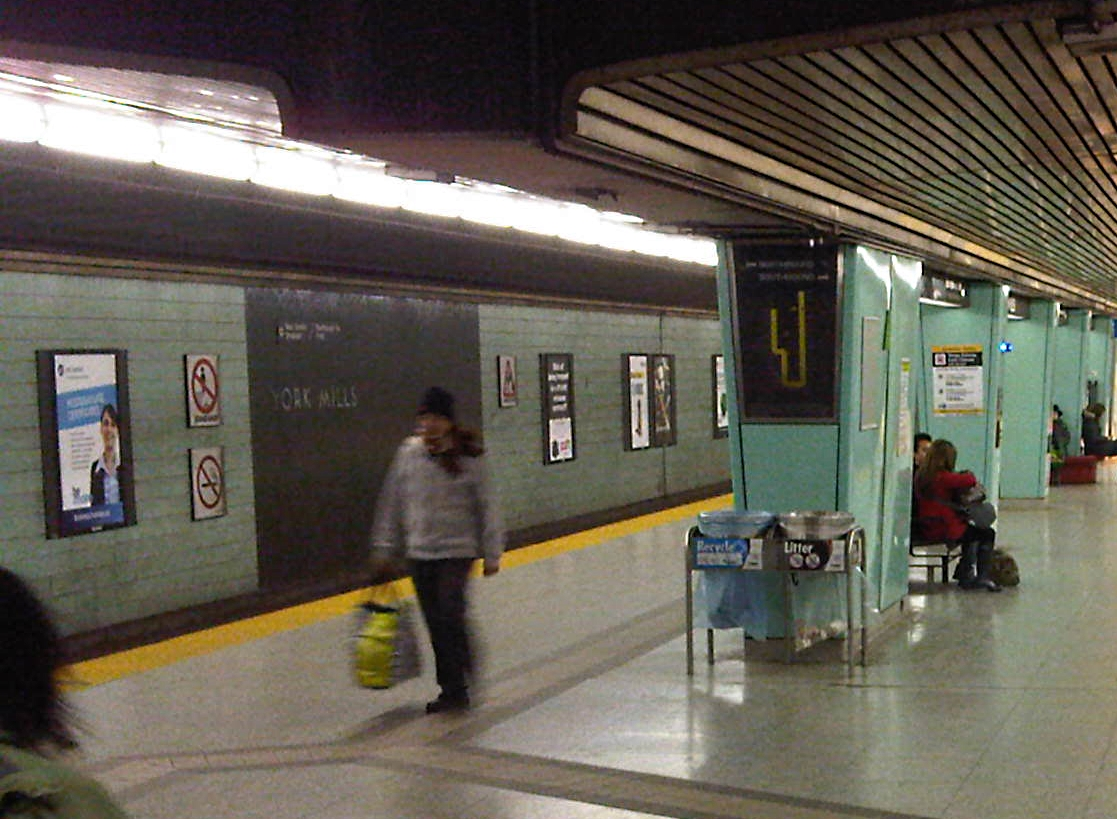
York Mills station platform's original 1973 wall tiles before being replaced in 2015

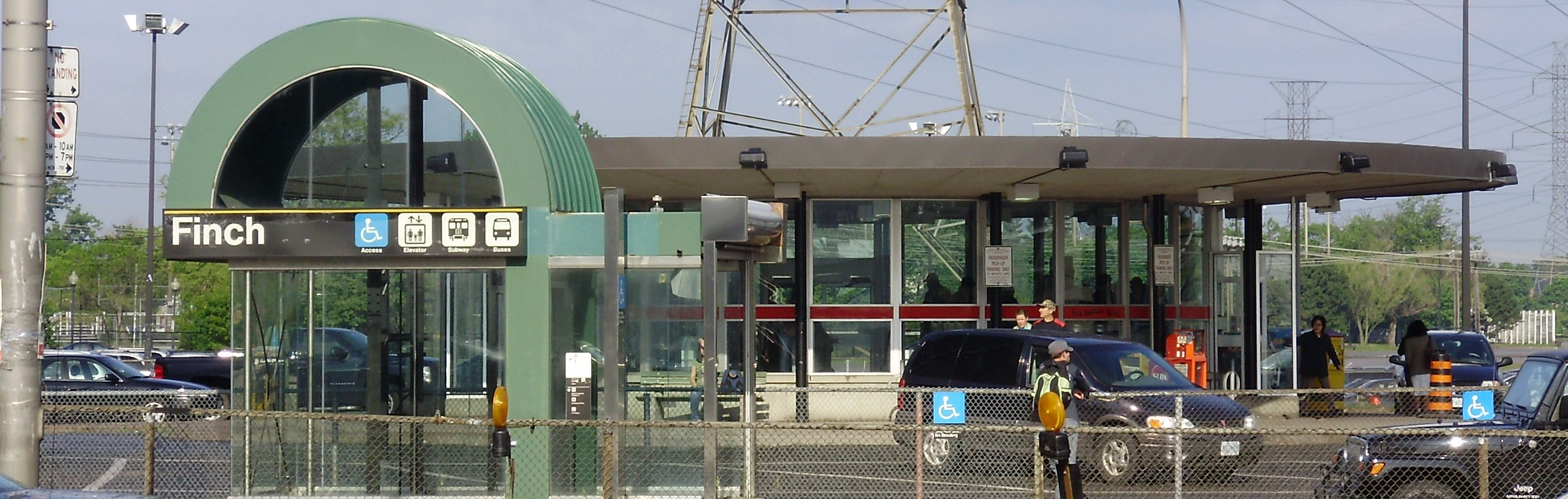
Terminus of the extension at Finch station

In 1972, a shortage of new subway cars prompted the TTC to recommend running only half of rush-hour trains on the extension once it opened to York Mills and to continue the practice once it had been extended to Finch. The other half would short turn at Eglinton. The first section of the extension to York Mills opened on March 31, 1973, with an opening ceremony held the day before. As suggested by the TTC, only half of rush-hour trains ran past Eglinton station, with headways of just over four minutes north of there compared to just over two minutes elsewhere on the line. All service at other times ran to York Mills. This arrangement led to confusion shortly after the section first opened. While there were fears of overcrowding on the Yonge line, excessive crowding did not occur as fewer riders than expected used the extension upon its opening. At the time, the remainder of the extension to Finch was reportedly 90 percent complete.

The remainder of the extension opened on March 30, 1974, with another opening ceremony held the day before. Service increased slightly to every four minutes north of Eglinton and every two minutes south of there, with peak-hour short turns at Eglinton continuing. Fears of overcrowding continued at the time, with the TTC proposing turning some trains back at Union station if necessary. On its first day of operation, crowding was noted and the 800-spot parking lot at Finch was full.

In May 1975, the TTC stopped short turning afternoon trains at Eglinton, continuing the practice only during the morning rush hour. In January 1978, the Spadina subway project extended the western leg of the line to Wilson, which within two months appeared to be reducing crowding on the Yonge segment. At the time, rush-hour trains either ran from St. Clair West to Finch or from Wilson to Eglinton. The rush-hour short turns on the Yonge line ended in 1979, when the TTC started running all trains to Finch to reduce still-significant crowding north of Eglinton. The Spadina segment short-turns remained.

== Later Line 1 extensions and plans ==
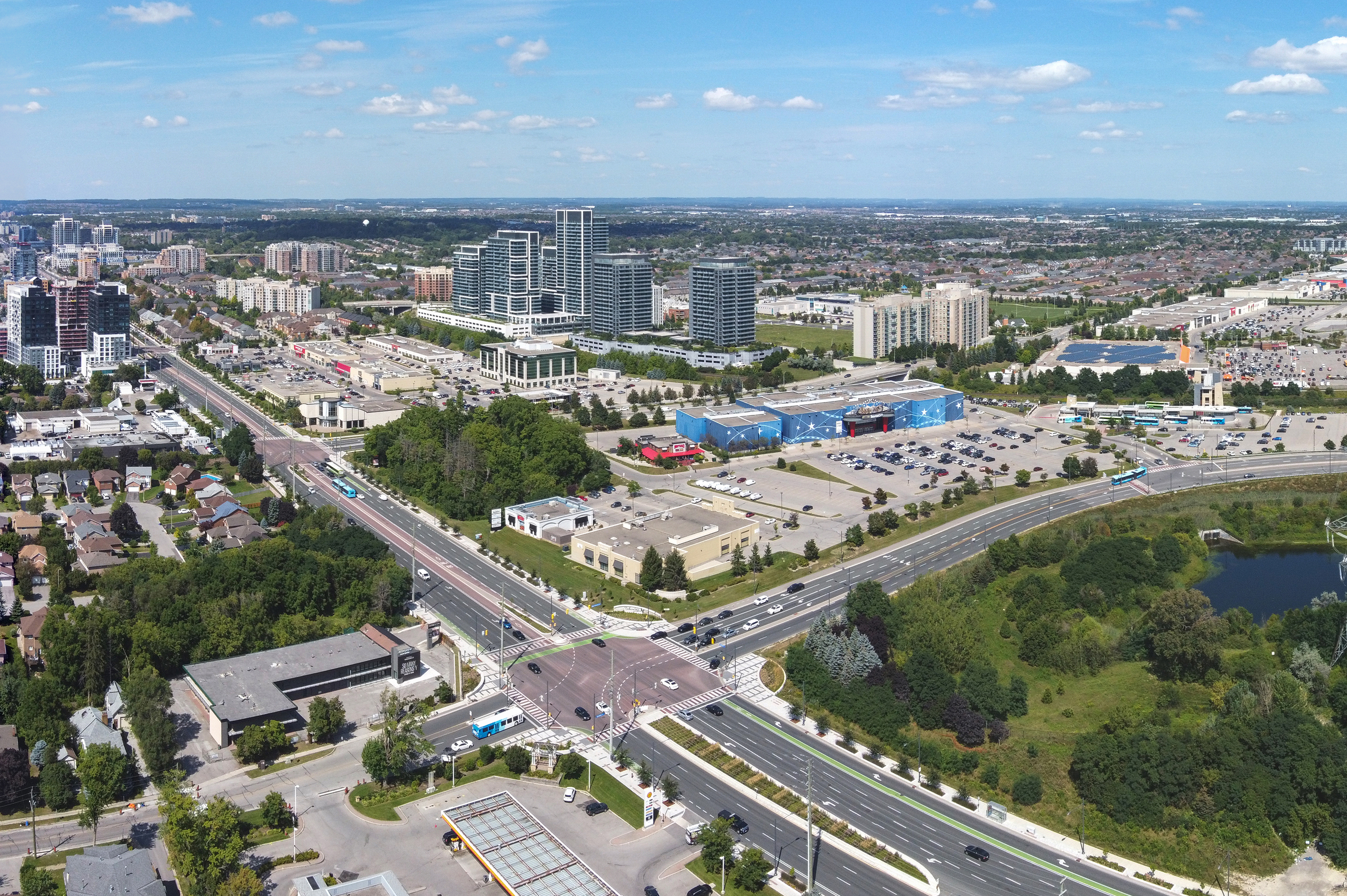
The Yonge North subway extension's terminus in Richmond Hill

When the extension fully opened, North York mayor Mel Lastman supported extending the line further to the then–Metropolitan Toronto limit at Steeles Avenue, but it would have required the approval of the province's newly established Toronto Area Transportation Operating Authority. In the late 1980s and early 1990s, the TTC instead proposed turning the Yonge–University–Spadina line into a circle route. Early plans had the loop closed via a hydro corridor north of Finch Avenue but later plans ran the loop along Steeles Avenue, allowing for subway service to York University. The loop proposal was abandoned by 2002 after the City of Vaughan successfully lobbied for a further extension of the Spadina branch to Highway 7, which opened in 2017, to serve their planned downtown core.

An extension of the Yonge line to near Highway 407 in York Region was proposed by Markham mayor Frank Scarpitti in 1993. By the end of 2009, an environmental assessment on the Yonge North subway extension (YNSE), which would extend the line further to Richmond Hill near Highway 407, was completed. The YNSE project was revised in the early 2020s and tunnelling on the extension is expected to begin in 2027. As of December 2025, the opening date for the extension is unknown. The project is owned and led by Metrolinx.
