= Michael Hayden (artist) =

Canadian artist

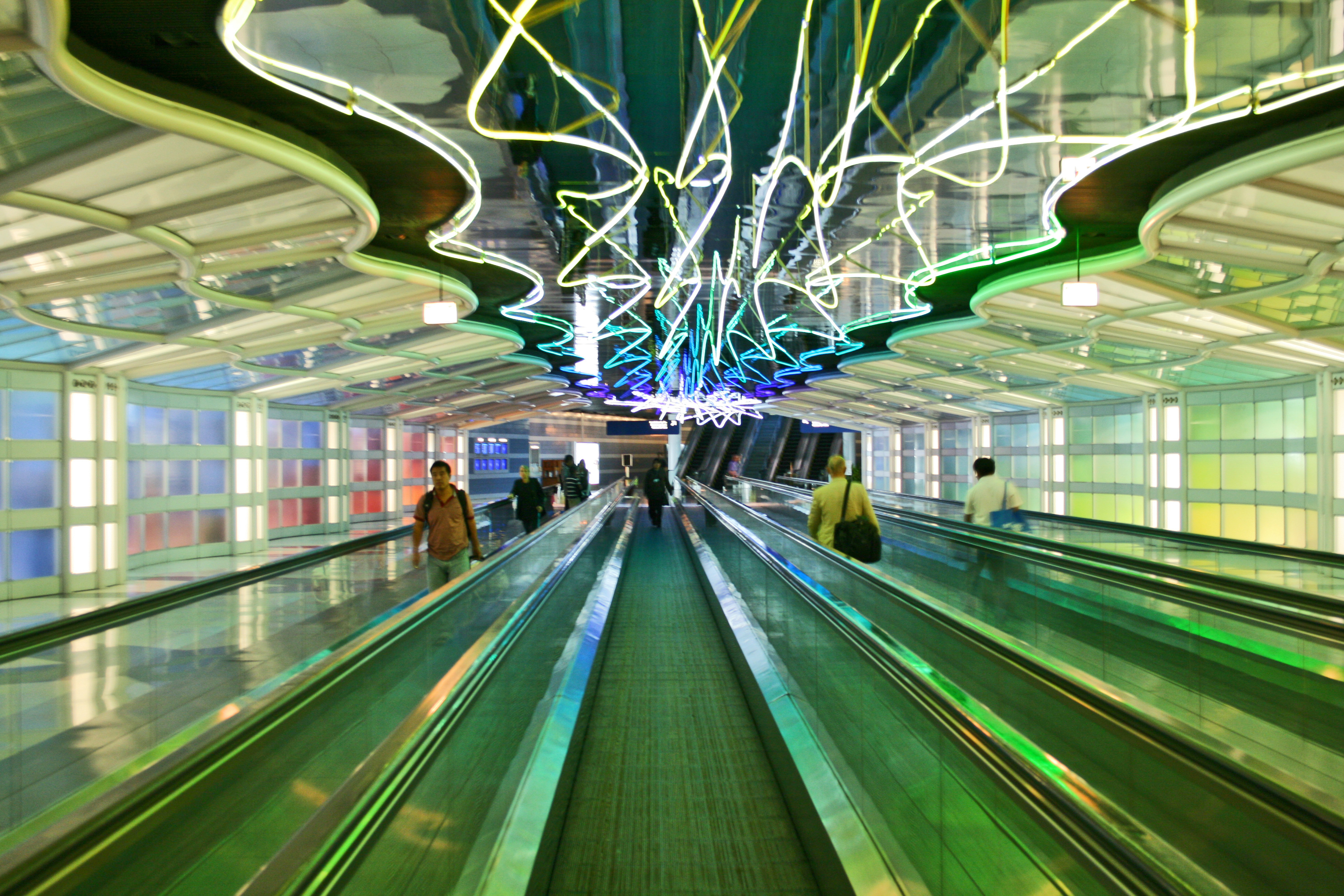
Sky's the Limit at O'Hare International Airport. The walkway is part of the United Airlines terminal that was designed by Helmut Jahn, and which has been listed as one of America's 150 favorite structures by the American Institute of Architects.

Michael Hayden (born January 15, 1943) is a Canadian artist who is noted for his artworks incorporating neon lighting. He preferred to use the term 'products' rather than artworks.

== Career ==
Hayden was born in Vancouver, British Columbia, the son of a designer who moved to Toronto with his family. Hayden attended the Ontario College of Art and while there created a ten-room presentation of sights, sounds, and smells, called "Mind Excursion". His best-known commission is Sky's the Limit (1987) at O'Hare International Airport in Chicago's United Airlines terminal (see photograph). Other prominent commissions include Arc en Ciel (1978), which was formerly installed at Yorkdale subway station in Toronto, York Electric Murals at York University Libraries, and Quadrille (1996), which is installed on a building in Charlotte, North Carolina.

Hayden's work is in the public collections of many museums, including the Institute of Contemporary Art, University of Pennsylvania, Philadelphia; the National Gallery of Canada, Ottawa; and the Art Gallery of Ontario, Toronto.
