= Cedardale =

Cedardale, Ontario may refer to:

- Cedardale, Lanark County, Ontario
- Cedardale, Ottawa, Ontario
- Cedardale (West Vancouver)
- Humewood–Cedarvale, neighbourhood in Toronto
