= Line 1 Yonge–University =

Rapid transit line in the Greater Toronto Area, Ontario

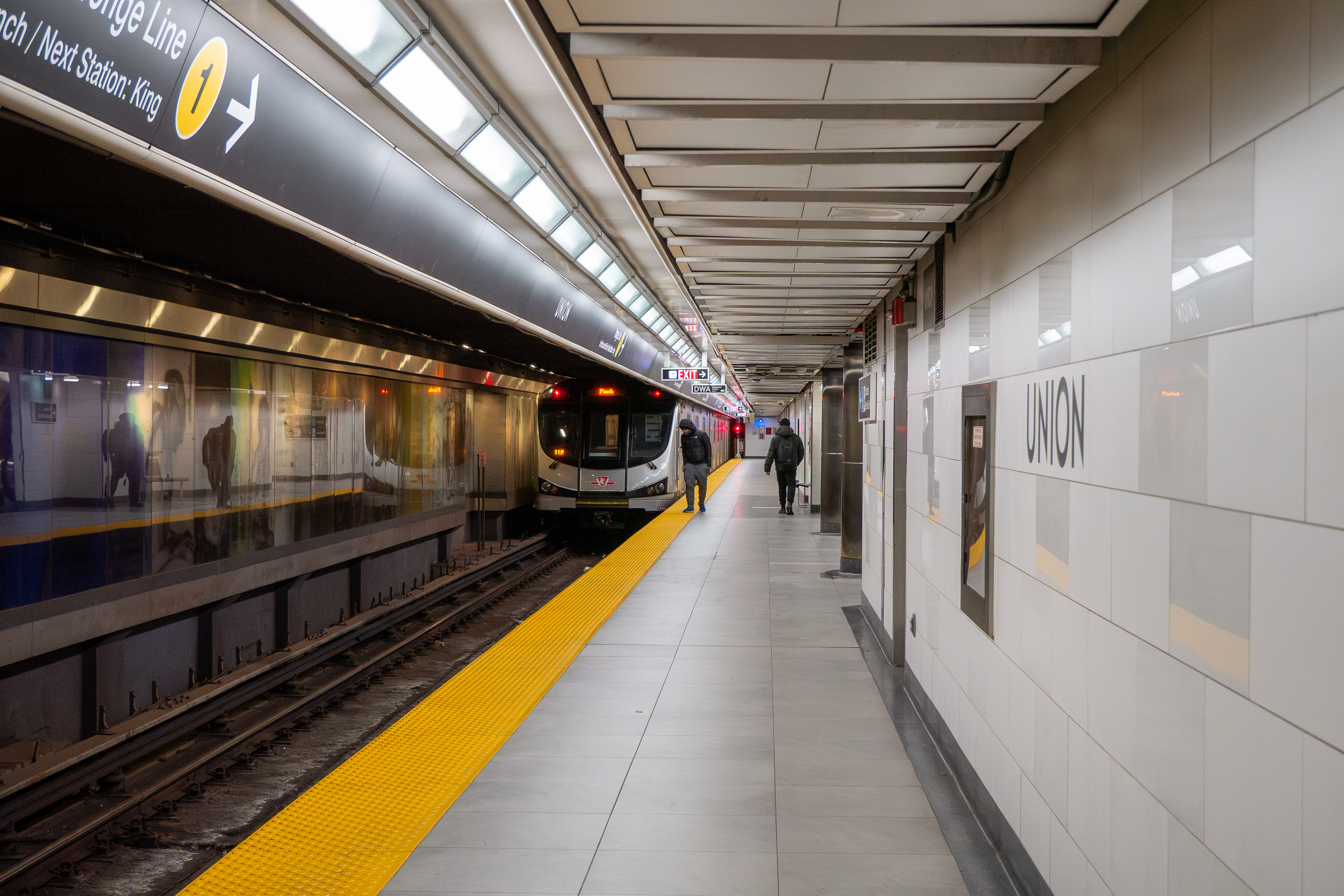
- Northbound to Finch platform at Union

Overview
- Status: Operational
- Owner: City of Toronto
- Locale: Greater Toronto
- Termini: Vaughan Metropolitan Centre; Finch
- Stations: 38 (5 under construction)
- Website: Official route page

Service
- Type: Rapid transit
- System: Toronto subway
- Operator: Toronto Transit Commission
- Depot(s): Wilson Yard, Davisville Yard
- Rolling stock: Toronto Rocket
- Daily ridership: 662,500 (November 2025 avg)

History
- Opened: March 30, 1954; 72 years ago
- Last extension: 2017

Technical
- Line length: 38.4 km (23.9 mi)
- Track gauge: 1,495 mm (4 ft 10 7/8 in) Toronto gauge
- Electrification: Third rail, 600 V DC
- Operating speed: 50 km/h (31 mph)
- Signalling: Alstom Urbalis 400 CBTC
Route map
Line 1 Yonge–University highlighted in black
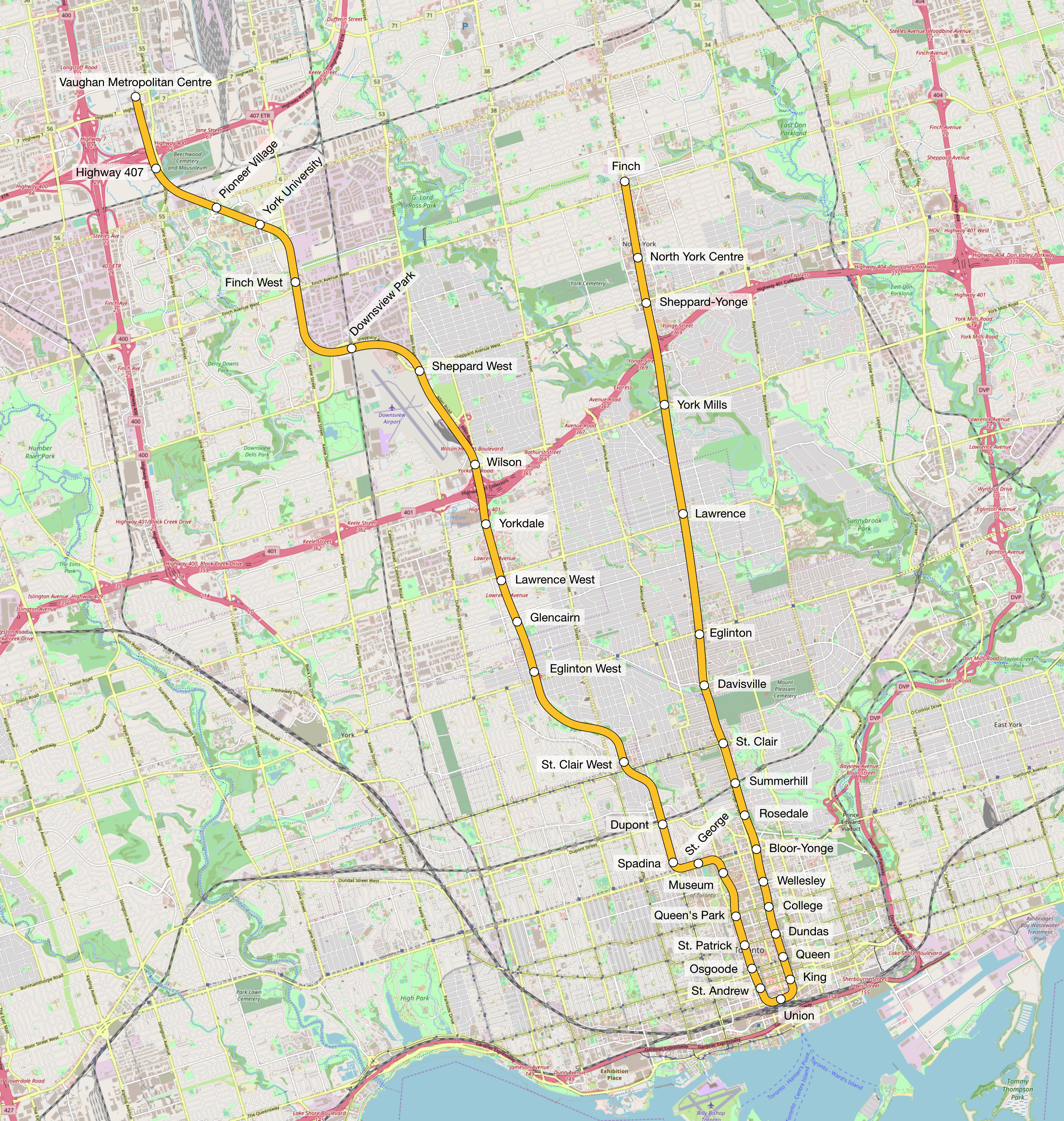

Line 1 Yonge–University is a rapid transit line of the Toronto subway. It serves Toronto and the neighbouring city of Vaughan in Ontario, Canada. Operated by the Toronto Transit Commission, it has 38 stations and is 38.4 kilometres (23.9 miles) in length, making it the longest line on the subway system. It opened as the Yonge subway in 1954 as Canada's first underground passenger rail line and was extended multiple times between 1963 and 2017. As of 2010, Line 1 was the busiest rapid transit line in Canada, and one of the busiest lines in North America. In the 12 months ending August 2024, it averaged over 625,000 riders per weekday.

== Route description ==
The line forms a rough 'U' shape, with two portions running generally north–south that meet at Union in the southern part of the city's downtown, and then gradually spreading farther apart as they proceed northward. From Union station, the eastern portion of the line runs straight under or nearby Yonge Street, sometimes in an uncovered trench, for 16 kilometres (9.9 mi) to its northeastern terminus at Finch Avenue, connecting with Line 2 at Bloor–Yonge, Line 5 at Eglinton, and Line 4 at Sheppard–Yonge. This eastern portion serves Downtown Toronto, Midtown Toronto and York Mills before ending at Finch Avenue, the northern edge of North York Centre.

The western portion snakes northwesterly from Union, initially running straight under University Avenue, Queen's Park Crescent, and the St. George campus of the University of Toronto to Bloor Street, where it turns westerly to run under Bloor Street for about 2,300 feet (700 m; 0.44 mi). Along this stretch, it interchanges with Line 2 again at St. George and Spadina stations. At Spadina Avenue, it turns north to run for roughly 1 kilometre (0.6 mi) under Spadina Road before curving northwesterly to continue along the Nordheimer and Cedarvale ravines to the foot of Allen Road at Eglinton Avenue where it interchanges with Line 5 again. It reaches the surface and continues northward in the road's median for six kilometres (3.7 mi) past Wilson station, after which it resumes travelling underground and runs northwesterly on an off-street alignment below suburban industrial areas, interchanging with the eastern terminus of Line 6 at Finch West station, before reaching the York University campus and Steeles Avenue. From there, it turns to parallel Jane Street for roughly 1.5 kilometres (0.9 mi) until its northwestern terminus in the neighbouring city of Vaughan's planned downtown core, the Vaughan Metropolitan Centre, at the intersection of Jane Street and Highway 7. This western portion serves the Annex and Forest Hill neighbourhoods in Old Toronto; Humewood–Cedarvale in the former city of York; Yorkdale–Glen Park, Downsview, the York University Heights–Northwood Park areas in the former North York; and the Vaughan Metropolitan Centre in Vaughan.

== Name ==
The line's name has been changed as it has been extended. Following its opening between Union Station and Eglinton Avenue along Yonge Street in 1954, it was called "the subway" (Yonge subway is its retronym). In 1963, it was extended along University Avenue to St. George station and renamed the Yonge–University Line. Briefly in 1966, the Yonge–University subway ran in two branches: one west along Bloor to Keele station (Yonge–University–Bloor), the other east along Bloor and Danforth to Woodbine station (Yonge–University–Danforth) via Bay Lower station.

In 1978, the Spadina section was opened and the line became the Yonge–University–Spadina Line (YUS). Although only two stations are on Spadina Road, a larger portion of the line was originally intended to follow the planned Spadina Expressway, which was partially built as Allen Road. The subway also had an additional internal route number: route 602.

Unofficially, subway lines were already numbered, but in October 2013, the TTC announced plans to display line numbers publicly to help riders to navigate the system. In March 2014, the line was officially numbered and renamed Line 1 Yonge–University, with the "Spadina" part being dropped from the name. Announcements, documentation and rapid transit maps across the system now refer to the line as Line 1 or Line 1 Yonge–University.

== History ==
=== Early proposals ===
There were several early proposals to build a subway along or near Yonge Street, many of which involved running streetcars in a tunnel. Here are some of the proposals.

- In 1909, an English company offered to build and operate a subway along Yonge Street from Eglinton Avenue to Front Street. The plan was abandoned because the city would take over public transit in 1921, and the company's franchise would then terminate.
- In 1910, when running for mayor of Toronto, Toronto Star co-founder Horatio C. Hocken proposed building a "tube" along Yonge Street from north of St. Clair Avenue to Front Street. He dropped the idea after losing that election.
- In 1911, a city engineer planned a line from Bay and Front streets to Yonge Street and St. Clair Avenue. The electorate rejected the plan.
- In 1931, City Controller Hacker proposed a north–south subway running from Avenue Road and St. Clair Avenue south to Front and York streets, making a wide loop via Front, Scott, Victoria and Gerrard streets. The TTC rejected this proposal saying there was insufficient population to justify such a project.
- In 1942, the TTC proposed a north–south line under Bay Street from Union Station to Bloor Street then jogging over to Yonge Street to continue to north of St. Clair Avenue. This idea was rejected in favour of a subway completely along Yonge Street.

=== Construction ===
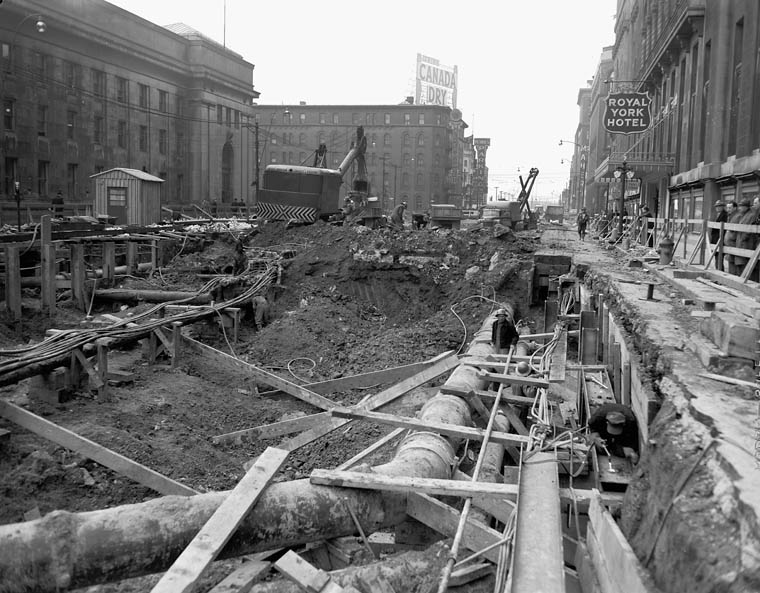
Subway excavations in front of Union Station (left) on Front Street in 1950

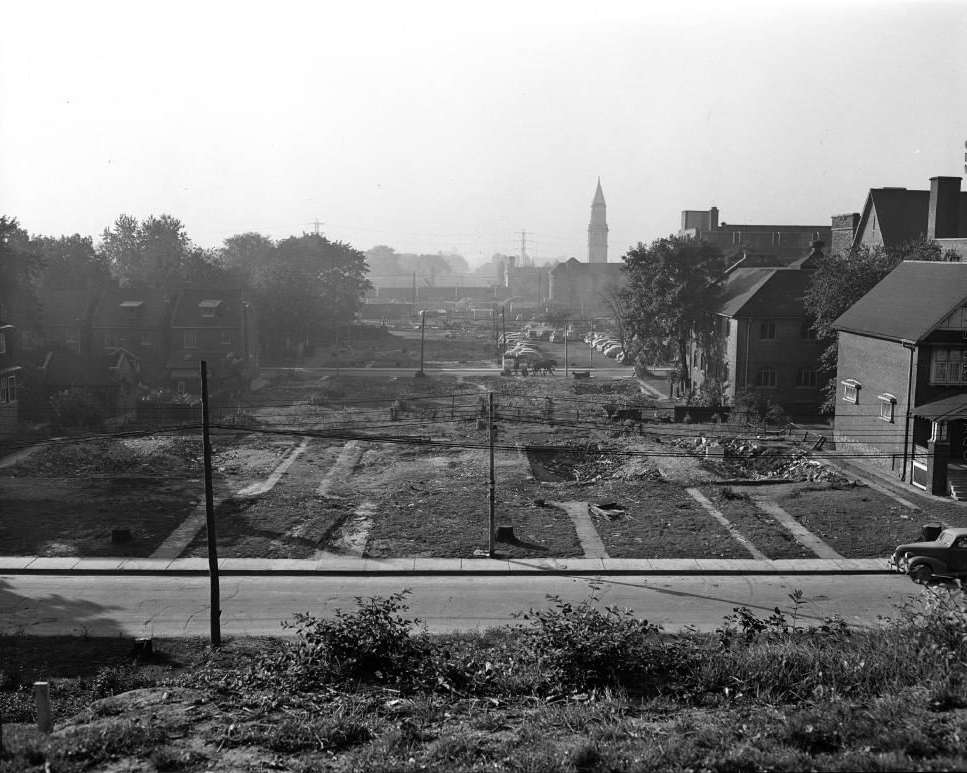
Homes were expropriated then demolished east of Yonge Street near Summerhill in order to construct a cut-and-cover tunnel.

During World War II, workers travelling from their homes in "northern Toronto" (which would now be considered part of the downtown core) to the industrial areas to the east and west of the downtown area on Yonge Street seriously strained the existing road and streetcar networks. There was concern that the expected post-war boom in car ownership would choke the city with traffic. The scheme was first proposed by Toronto Transportation Commission in 1942 to relieve congestion, which was delaying their bus and tram services. The TTC formed a Rapid Transit Department and studied various solutions between 1942 and 1945.

A plan was put to the voters on January 1, 1946. The plan had two parts. First, it featured a "rapid transit subway" operated with subway trains from Eglinton Avenue to the north as far as College Street to the south. The line would continue directly under Yonge and Front Streets to Union Station. Second would be a "surface car subway", diverting streetcar services off Queen Street and Dundas Street. This would run mostly along Queen Street, with each end angling north to reach Dundas Street west of Trinity Park to the west and Gerrard Street at Pape Avenue. The route would run directly under Queen Street from University Avenue to Church Street, with the rest off-street. The vote was overwhelmingly in favour, and Toronto City Council approved construction four months later.

The plebiscite contained the condition that the federal government would subsidize 20 percent of the project. The federal Minister of Reconstruction, C.D. Howe, promised federal support in an October 3, 1945, letter. However, the funding fell through over a disagreement about the details of the employment arrangements. A scaled down proposal, about 20 percent smaller, was agreed to in its place. The work along Queen Street was abandoned temporarily, and the original $42.3 million ($755 million in 2025) was reduced to $28.9 million ($516 million in 2025) plus $3.5 million ($62.5 million in 2025) for rolling stock. After a two-year delay due to postwar labour shortages, construction on the new subway did not start until September 8, 1949. A total of 1.3 millioncubic metres (1.7 millioncubic yards) of material was removed and some 12,700 tonnes (14,000 tons) of reinforcing steel and 1.4 million bags of cement were put into place. A roughed-in station was constructed below Queen station for a proposed Queen line, but that line was never built.

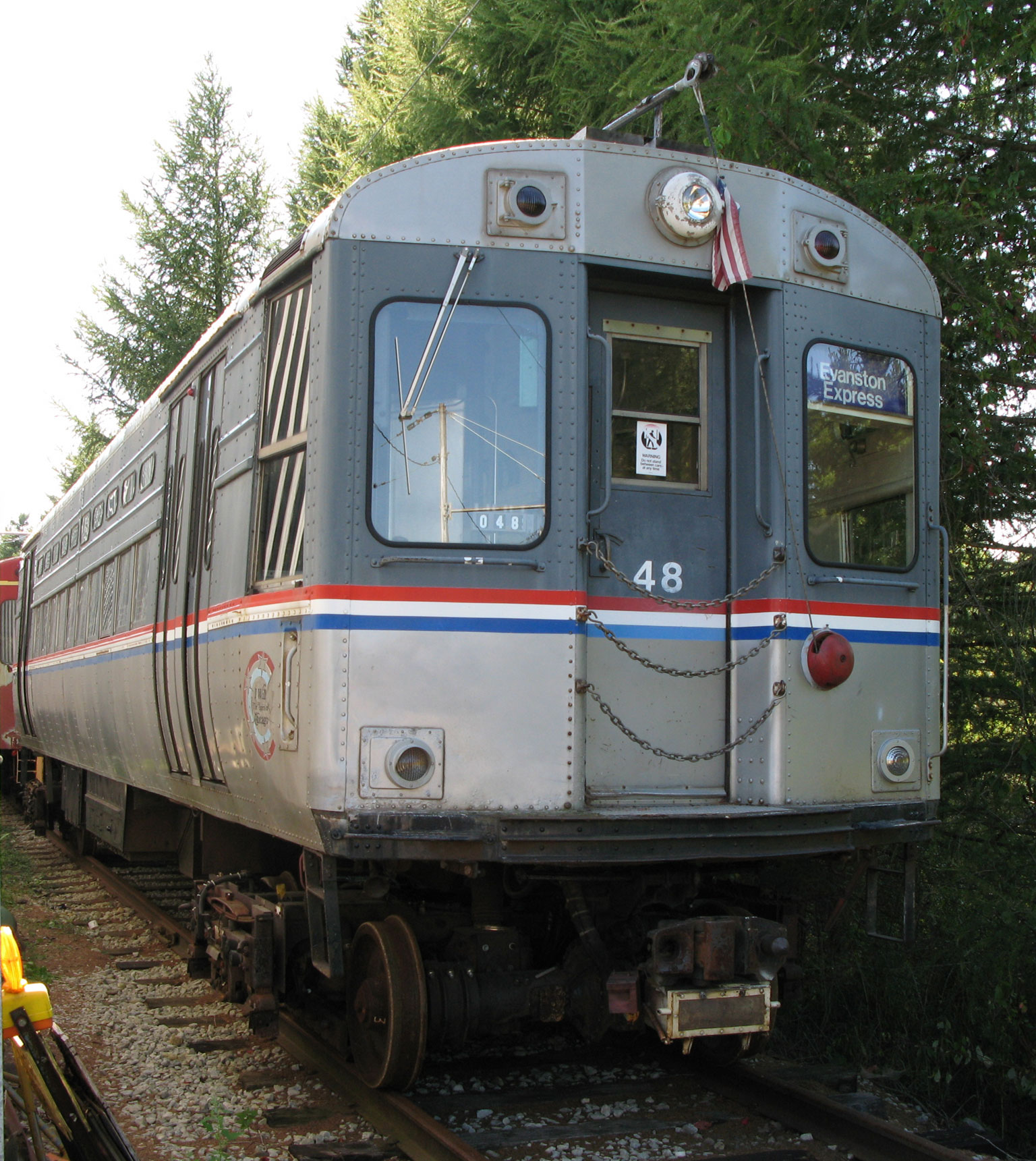
The TTC intended the subway to use streetcar-derived trains, like this former Chicago 'L' train preserved at the Halton County Radial Railway.

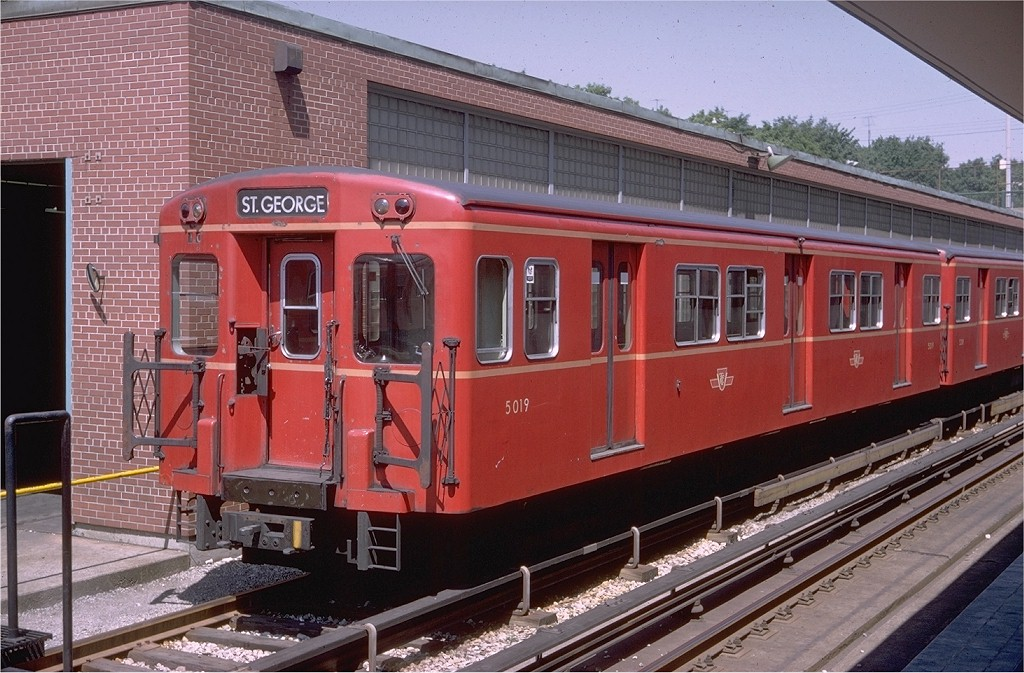
The Gloucester (G-series) trains were chosen to be the system's first rolling stock.

Service on the Yonge route would be handled by new rolling stock, and the TTC was particularly interested in the Chicago series 6000 cars, which used trucks, wheels, motors, and drive control technologies that had been developed and perfected on PCC streetcars. However, the United States was in the midst of the Korean War at the time, which had caused a substantial increase in metal prices, thus making the PCC cars too expensive for the TTC. Instead, in November 1951, an order was placed with the Gloucester Railway Carriage and Wagon Company in England for 104 cars for $7,800,000 ($92.8 million in 2025) including spare parts.

TTC rapid transit logo, 1946, used during the construction of the subway

The Toronto Subway typeface and TTC logo were also designed during this period. The logo used during the subway's development was designed by mid-century architect John C. Parkin and chief architect Arthur Keith. Against the wishes of Walter Paterson, the chief engineer, TTC chairman William McBrien and general manager H.C. Patten rejected the design in favour of one that was more similar to the one previously used on TTC vehicles.

=== Opening ===
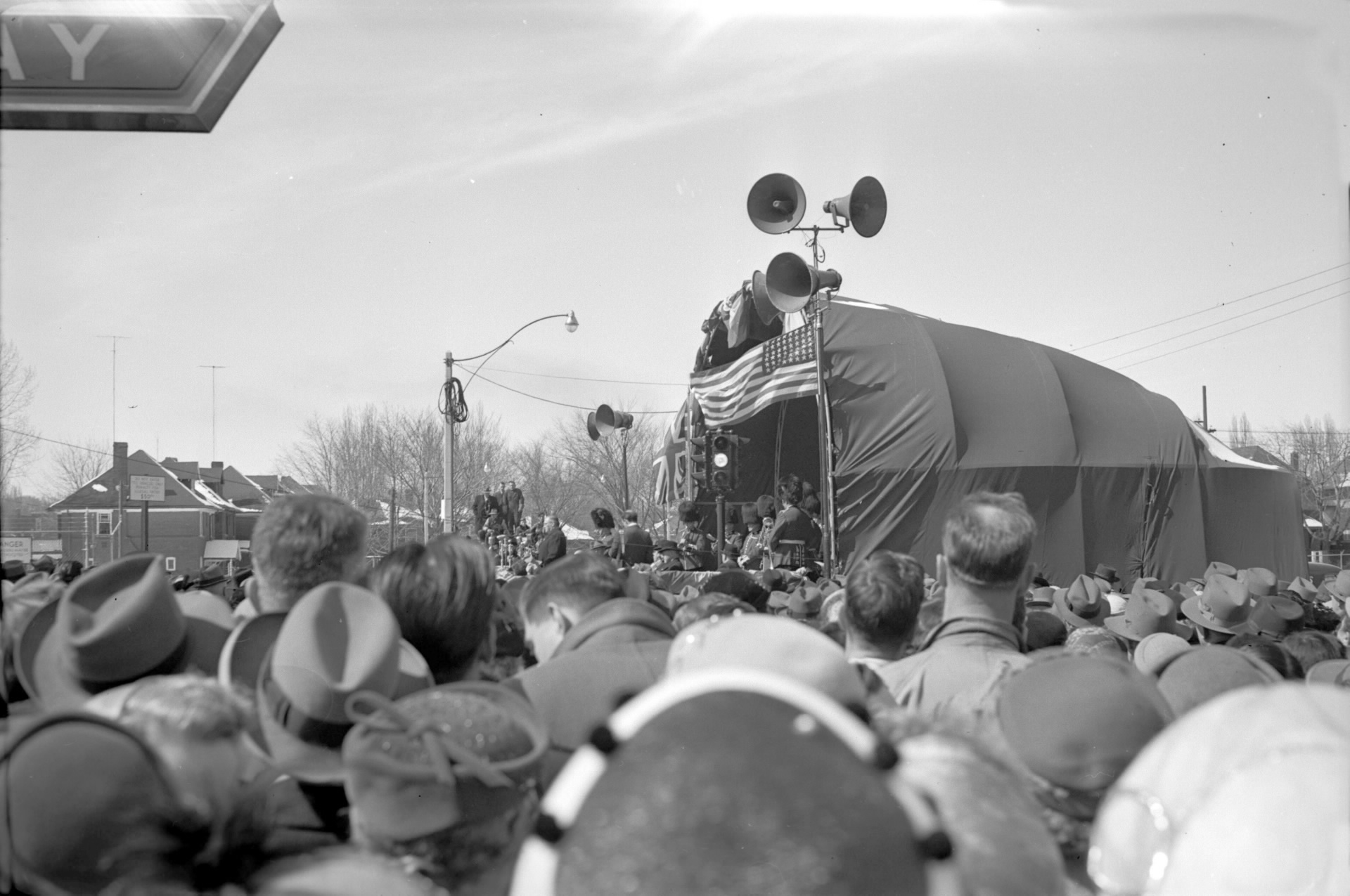
The opening ceremonies for the Yonge Street subway line, March 30, 1954

After five years of construction, Ontario Premier Leslie Frost and Toronto Mayor Allan Lamport officially opened the 7.4-kilometre (4.6 mi) long Yonge subway on March 30, 1954. It was the first subway in Canada.

The original Yonge Street subway line went from Union subway station near the namesake railway station north to Eglinton station. Dignitaries, including the premier and the mayor, rode the first train that morning, going north from the yards at Davisville station, and then from Eglinton station south along the entire line. The line was then opened to the public, and that day at 2:30 pm, the last streetcar made its final trip along the Yonge streetcar line.

=== Operations and extensions ===
Trains operated at average speeds of 32 kilometres per hour (20 mph). The plan to operate two-car trains during off-peak hours was abandoned in favour of four-car trains, and six-car trains were standard during most periods, with some eight-car trains used during peak periods.

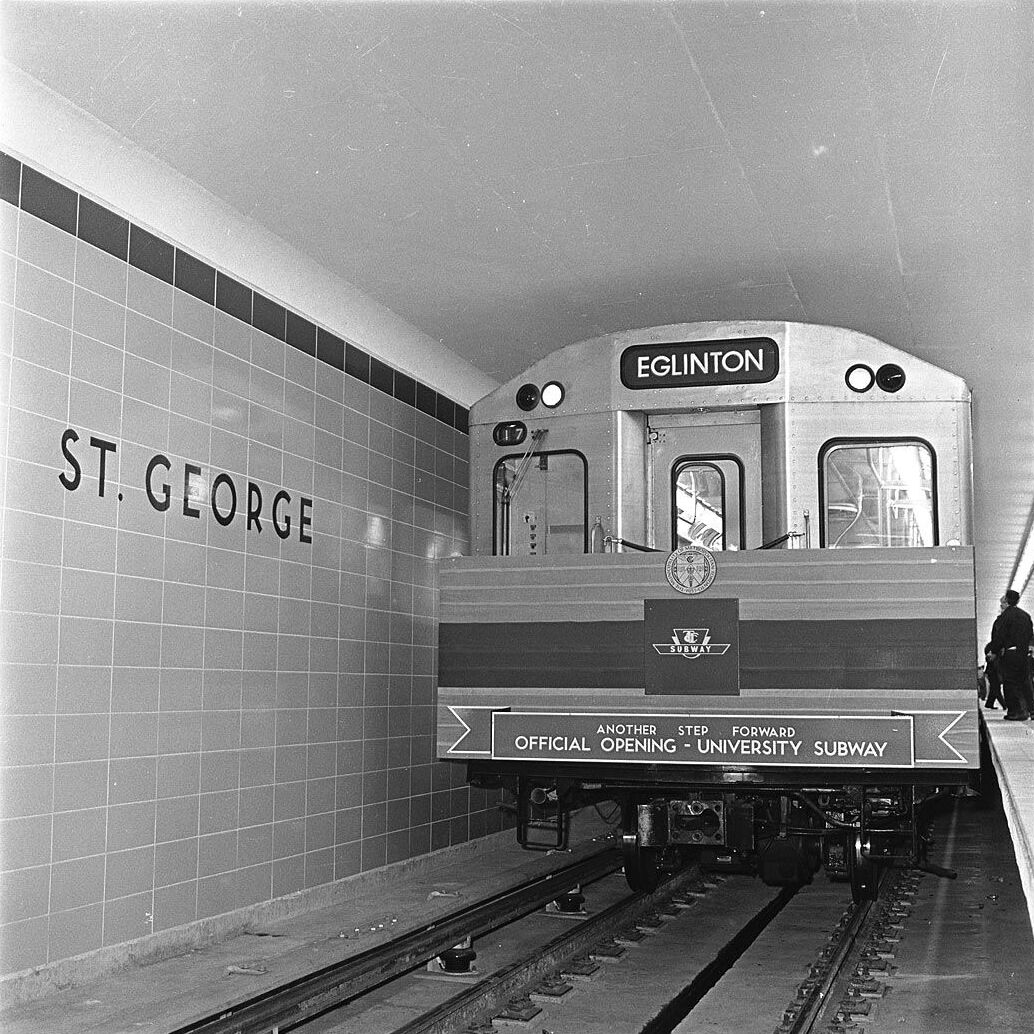
An inaugural M-1 subway train at St. George station during the opening of the University subway, 1963

On November 16, 1959, construction began on an extension of the subway, which curved north from Union Station, below University Avenue and Queen's Park to near Bloor Street, where it turned west to terminate at St. George and Bloor Street. The extension opened on February 28, 1963.

On February 26, 1966, the Bloor–Danforth line opened, from Keele to Woodbine. For six months, as a trial, the Yonge–University line operated as two branches: Eglinton–Keele and Eglinton–Woodbine. The interlining trial was determined to be ineffective, and the Yonge–University line was cut back to St. George on September 4, 1966.

On June 23, 1969, the University subway service from St. George to Union stations was discontinued entirely after 9:45 p.m. from Mondays to Saturdays and all day on Sundays and holidays. The 5B Avenue Road buses would run in place between Eglinton and Front Street whenever the University subway did not operate, with side-jaunts to St. George station to capture passengers from the Bloor subway. This arrangement remained in place until January 28, 1978, when the Spadina subway opened north to Wilson Station.

On March 31, 1973, the line was extended north from Eglinton to York Mills, and on March 29, 1974, to Finch. These two extensions were part of the first Yonge subway extension, bringing the subway to North York.

On January 28, 1978, the Spadina segment of the line was opened for service (following a ceremonial opening on January 27), going from St. George station, the north terminus of the University line, to Wilson station. From St. George station, the 9.9 km (6.2 mi) segment ran north and northwest to Eglinton Avenue and Allen Road, then north along the median of the Allen Road to Wilson Avenue. This extension had been proposed as part of the Spadina Expressway, but when the expressway portion south of Eglinton Avenue was cancelled after massive protests, the subway was still built following the route through Cedarvale Ravine. Hence, it was called the Spadina line, though it follows Spadina Road for less than 2 km (1.2 mi).

On June 18, 1987, North York Centre station was added between Sheppard and Finch stations as an infill station to serve the rapidly growing North York City Centre.

On August 11, 1995, at 6:02 pm, the Russell Hill subway accident occurred as a southbound subway train heading toward Dupont station crashed under Russell Hill Drive, killing three passengers and sending 30 to hospital. This accident prompted the Toronto Transit Commission to review its practices and put resources into safety.

On March 31, 1996, the Spadina segment of the line was extended 2 km (1.2 mi) from Wilson north to Downsview (renamed Sheppard West in 2017).

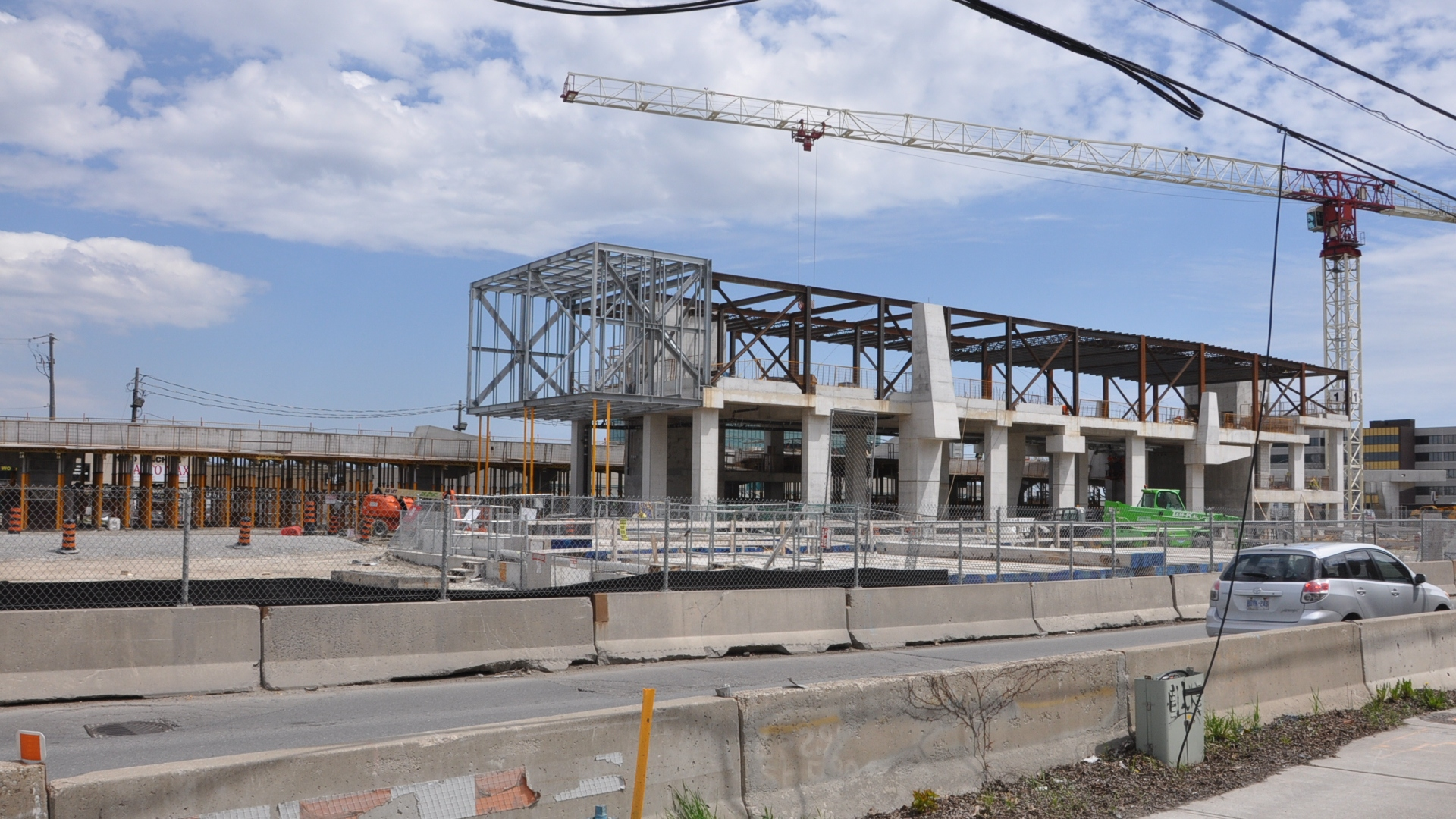
Finch West station on the TYSSE under construction in 2016

On November 17, 2016, with the Presto fare gates installed at Eglinton station, all of the stations along the line became Presto-enabled.

On December 17, 2017, the Spadina portion was further extended 8.6 kilometres (5.3 mi) north to Vaughan Metropolitan Centre in the City of Vaughan in York Region, via York University. The Toronto–York Spadina subway extension (TYSSE) project built six new stations at a cost of $3.2 billion, with 6.2 kilometres (3.9 mi) in Toronto and 2.4 kilometres (1.5 mi) in York Region. The TYSSE was the first new section of a subway line to be opened since the opening of Line 4 Sheppard in 2002. In the year after the extension opened, most stations on the extension saw below average ridership compared to the rest of the subway system.

==== Yonge North extension ====
Launch shaft for construction of the YNSE in York Region, with tunnel boring machines being assembled in October 2026

The Yonge North subway extension (YNSE) is an extension of the line north of Finch station to Richmond Hill in York Region. The second project to extend Line 1 north along the Yonge branch, this 8-kilometre (5.0-mile) extension will introduce five new stations, three underground and two at surface level, and was estimated to cost $5.6 billion in 2021. The three underground stations will be located at Steeles Avenue, Clark Avenue, and Royal Orchard Boulevard, respectively. North of Royal Orchard, the line will emerge above ground, curving east before running parallel to GO Transit's Richmond Hill line. The two surface-level stations will be situated along the railway corridor. One of these, Bridge station, located between Highway 7 and Highway 407, will serve as a key intermodal hub, connecting with Viva and GO buses and offering direct access to the existing Langstaff GO Station. Preliminary construction work began in 2023, with the tunnelling contract awarded in 2025.

First proposed in the mid-2000s, the extension was initially conceived with six fully underground stations: Cummer/Drewry, Steeles, Clark, Royal Orchard, Langstaff/Longbridge, and Richmond Hill Centre. While first priced at $5.6 billion in 2017, the cost for this fully underground version had increased to $9.3 billion by 2021, necessitating the reduction in scope that led to the five-station plan.

Expected to take a decade to complete, the YNSE aims to reduce traffic congestion by eliminating an estimated 2,500 daily bus trips along its corridor. It is forecast to serve 94,000 daily riders and, by 2031, carry 58 million annual passengers. York Region anticipates that the extension will generate 31,000 jobs.

== Design ==
=== Line ===
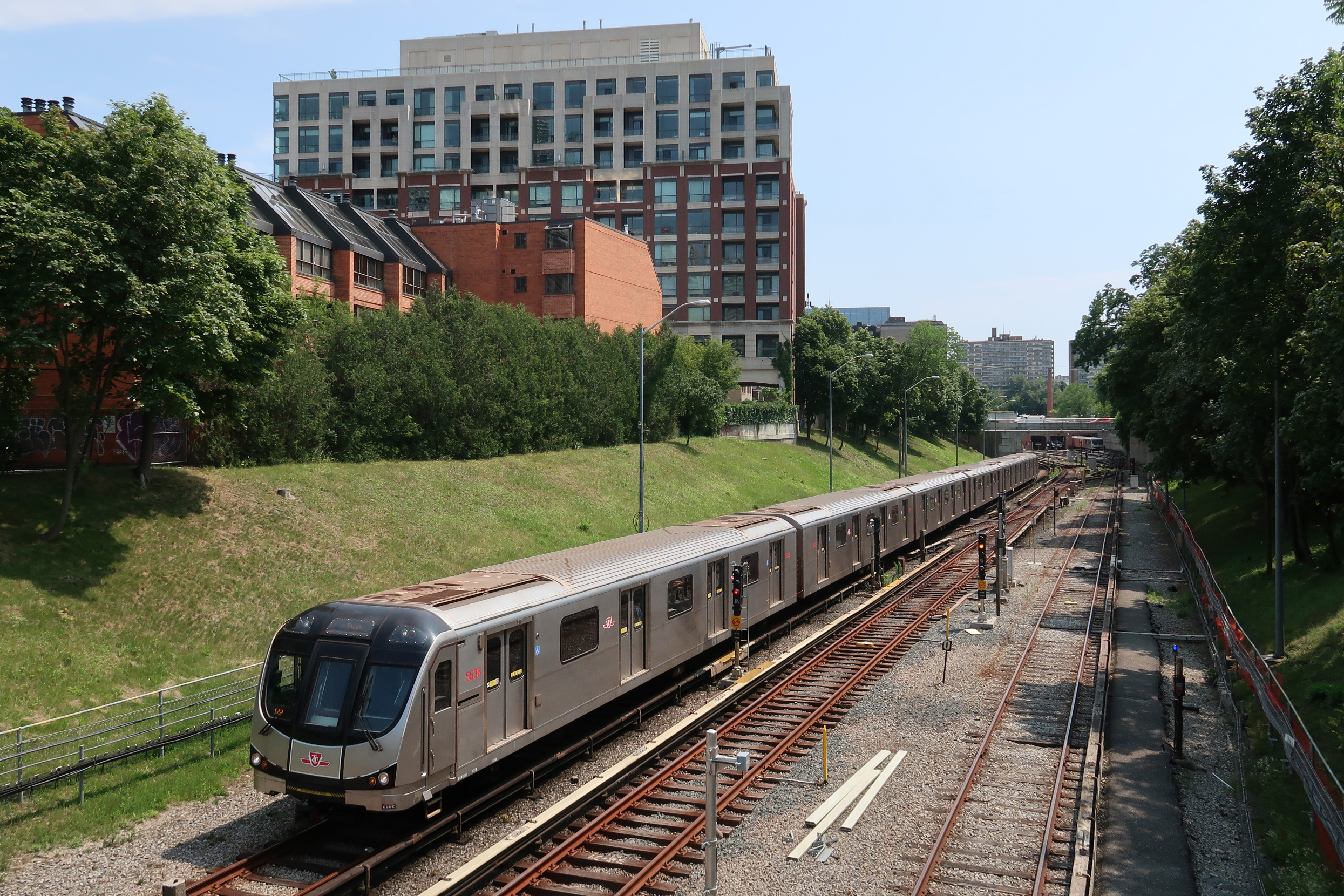
An open-cut section looking south to Davisville station

The line is mostly underground but has several surface sections between Sheppard West and Cedarvale, and between Bloor–Yonge and Eglinton. Most of the line between Bloor–Yonge and Eglinton stations was originally constructed in open cut, with the short section between St. Clair and Summerhill stations having since been covered over. Evidence of this can be seen in the tunnel: there are no columns or walls between tracks, and ballast and drainage ditches are present, something not seen in the rest of the subway system. There are also tree stumps and the stubs of lamp posts in the tunnel. There are also clues outdoors: seemingly unnecessary railings along the sides of a nearby street, which was once a bridge over the tracks, and empty lots following the trains' right-of-way marked with signs warning heavy vehicles and equipment to keep off because they might fall through to the columnless tunnel below.

Most of the tunnel was constructed by a cut-and-cover method, but some sections were bored, as noted below. All stations, whether by transfer or fare-paid terminal, connect to surface TTC bus and/or streetcar routes. Other surface and train connections are noted below.

Since 1996, TTC stations have been built or modified with elevators, ramps and other features to make them accessible to all. As of January 2022, 30 stations on the line are fully accessible. All stations on the line are projected to be made accessible by 2025, as per the Accessibility for Ontarians with Disabilities Act.

Because the line opened in sections from 1954, it has a relatively high number of crossovers, which were mostly constructed at terminal stations to turn back trains. There are 17 diamond crossovers located between the service tracks along the length of the line. There are also eight storage tracks, which can also be used for reversals. The high number of possible turnbacks gives the TTC more flexibility when planning maintenance or in the event of an emergency service disruption.

=== Stations ===
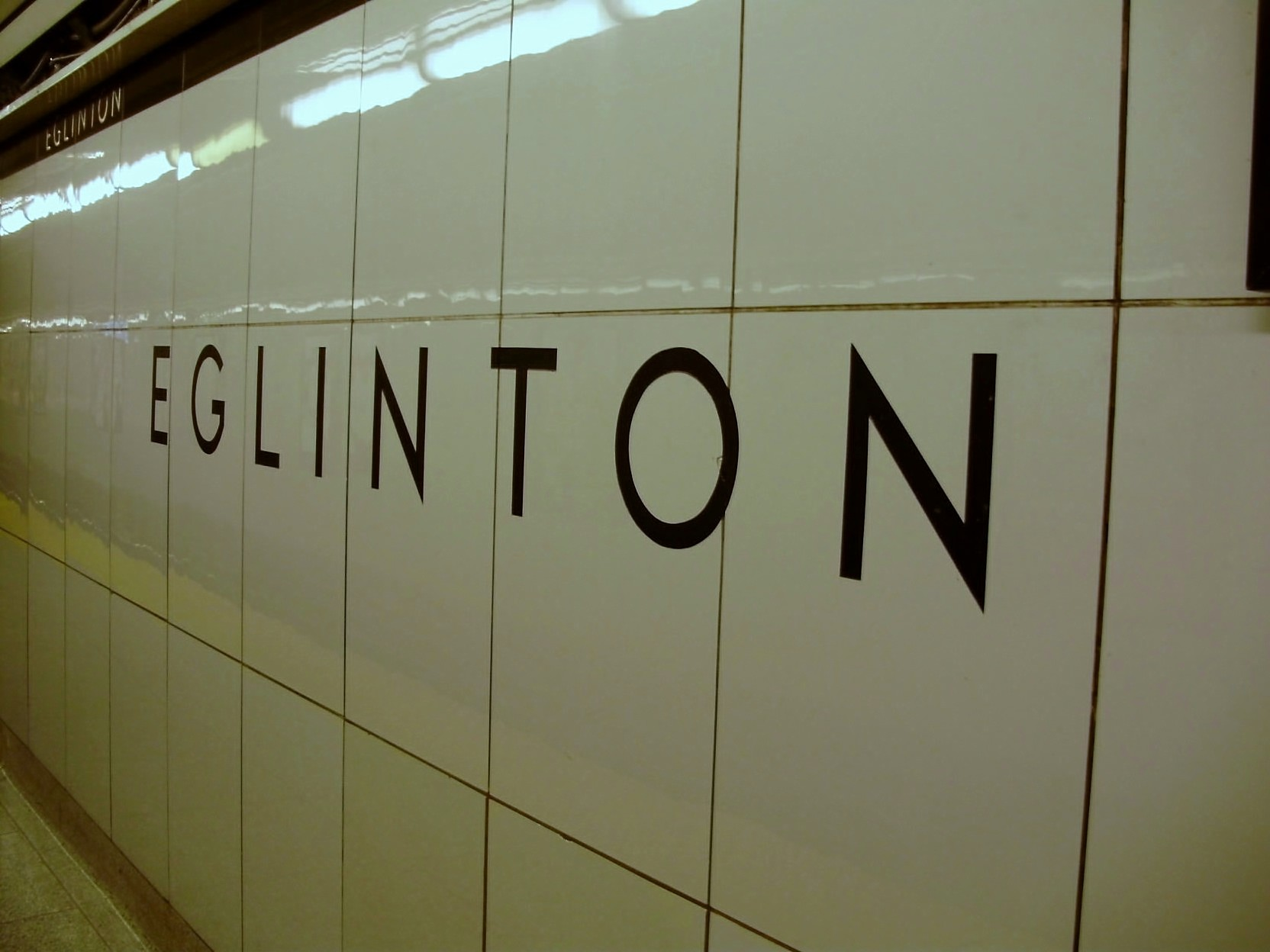
Eglinton station's Vitrolite-tiled walls are the last such station wall treatment left in the system.

The original design of the oldest stations in the subway system, which are on the Yonge line (from Union to Eglinton stations), are mainly utilitarian and characterized by vitreous marble wall tiles also known as Vitrolite and the use of the Toronto Subway typeface for station names. Eglinton station is the only station to retain this wall treatment, though Queen Station retains a narrow band of original blue Vitrolite tiles near the ceiling at platform level.

The design of the stations on the University line was mainly utilitarian and this style (sometimes referred to as bathroom modern) was later used for Line 2 Bloor–Danforth as well. Queen's Park and St. Patrick stations have circular and semi-circular cross-sections because they are constructed in bored tunnels. Museum station was renovated in the late 2000s to have columns that resemble artifacts found in the nearby Royal Ontario Museum.

Lawrence and Sheppard–Yonge (formerly Sheppard) stations are similar to each other in design, but have different colour schemes: Lawrence is red and cream and Sheppard is yellow and dark blue. York Mills station formerly followed the same design scheme—in light green and dark green—until it was renovated. Likewise, Finch station also formerly followed that same design scheme—albeit in light grey, medium grey, and dark grey—until it was renovated to have yellow panels similar to that of post-renovation Kipling station on Line 2.

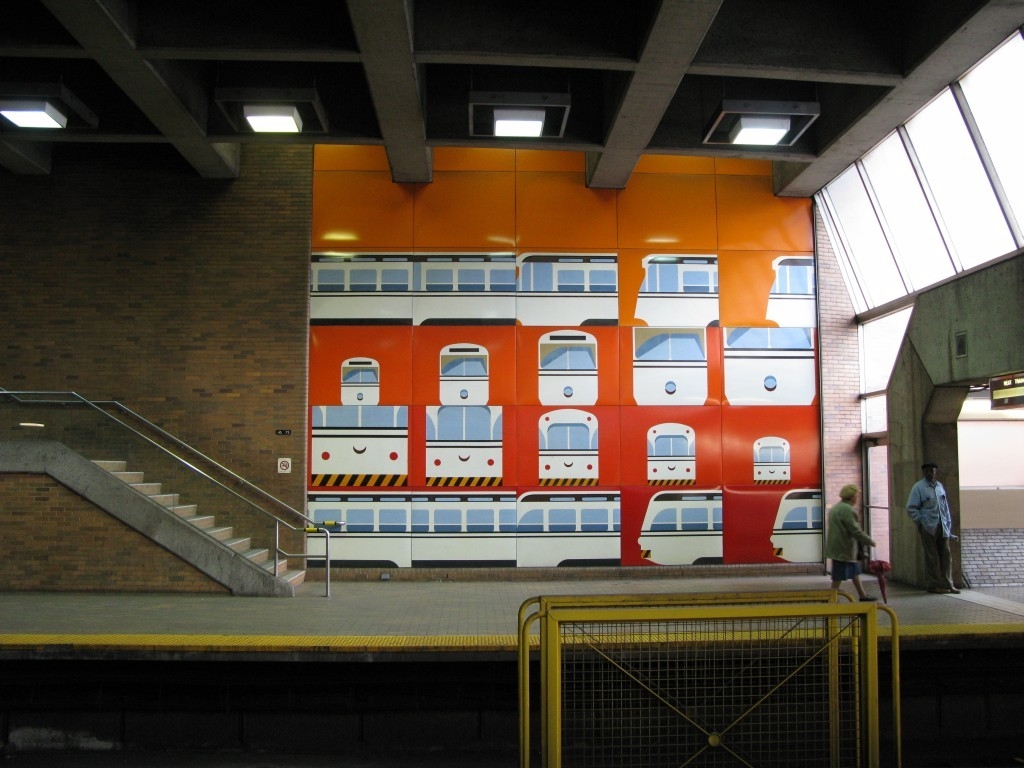
Summertime Streetcar at Cedarvale station depicting PCC streetcars

The section of the line between Spadina and Wilson stations (formerly the Spadina segment) opened in 1978 has art and architecture that is unique for each station, such as flower murals in Dupont station or streetcar murals in Cedarvale station. The art originally installed at Glencairn and Yorkdale stations had been removed, as the former's art had faded in sunlight and the latter was too costly to operate. Since late 2017, work is underway to restore the art in both stations, with Glencairn's being fully re-installed in 2020, albeit modernized.

North York Centre station is an infill station. Its design is different from the other stations in the original Yonge subway extension. Sheppard West station, which was opened in 1996 as Downsview station, has art and architecture that is different from the stations built earlier along its western portion of the line.

Stations on the 2017 extension from Sheppard West north to Vaughan Metropolitan Centre, in keeping with the pattern of the original Spadina line, also feature public art and architecture from notable creators. However, the platform walls have no tiles or other cladding and are simply bare concrete, though structural elements on the platforms themselves are clad, as is the case with much of the Line 4 Sheppard stations.

=== Names and terminal designation ===
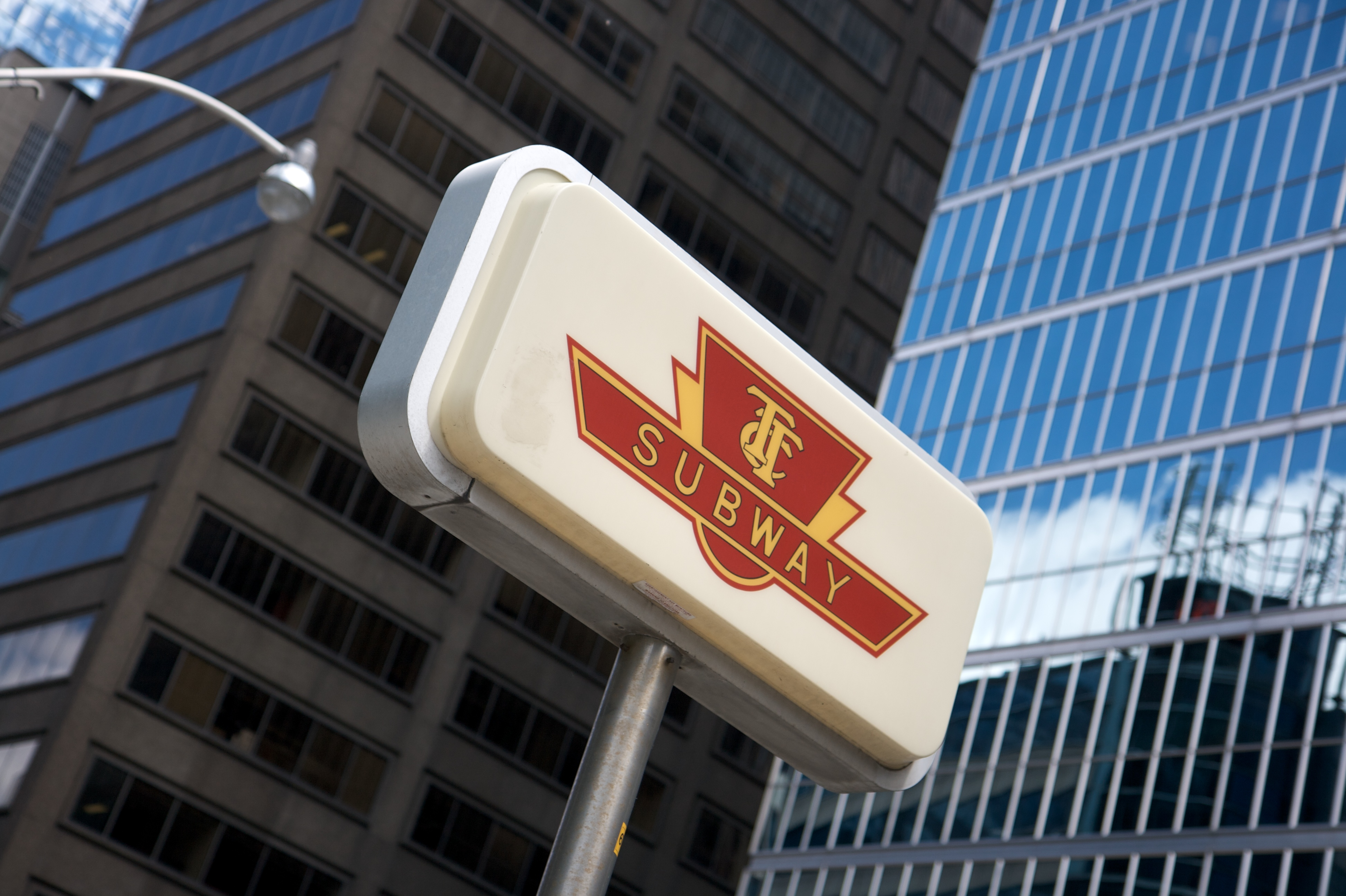
Original-style subway entrance sign in Downtown Toronto in 2008

On the Yonge portion of the line, nearly all stations located at cross streets are named after said streets, while on the University portion, they are either named for local landmarks with the cross street subtitled below (e.g. Osgoode – Queen Street) or after cross streets but with a "West" suffix for stations at streets that have counterparts along Yonge, though Dundas West station is on Line 2 Bloor–Danforth. The pattern of using landmarks as station names was exclusively used on the original (southern) section of the University branch, and the West designated street-naming convention is typically used on the former Spadina (northern) section. The two interchange stations on the University branch where it intersects Line 2 Bloor–Danforth are named St. George and Spadina after the north–south cross streets of Line 2, which runs below Line 1 between these stations. Due to various factors, some stations along the Spadina portion are named or were formerly named using landmark or district names, albeit without subtitles: the stations at Steeles Avenue and Highway 7 (which have no corresponding stations along the Yonge branch) are respectively named Pioneer Village (after the nearby Black Creek Pioneer Village, which has since been renamed the Village at Black Creek) and Vaughan Metropolitan Centre (after Vaughan's new downtown core, based on the precedent set by North York Centre and Scarborough Centre stations). Sheppard West was originally called Downsview but was renamed in 2017 to avoid confusion with the adjacent new Downsview Park station, and Eglinton West was renamed Cedarvale (after the Cedarvale neighbourhood to the south) on December 7, 2025, in preparation for it becoming an interchange station with Line 5 Eglinton in February 2026.

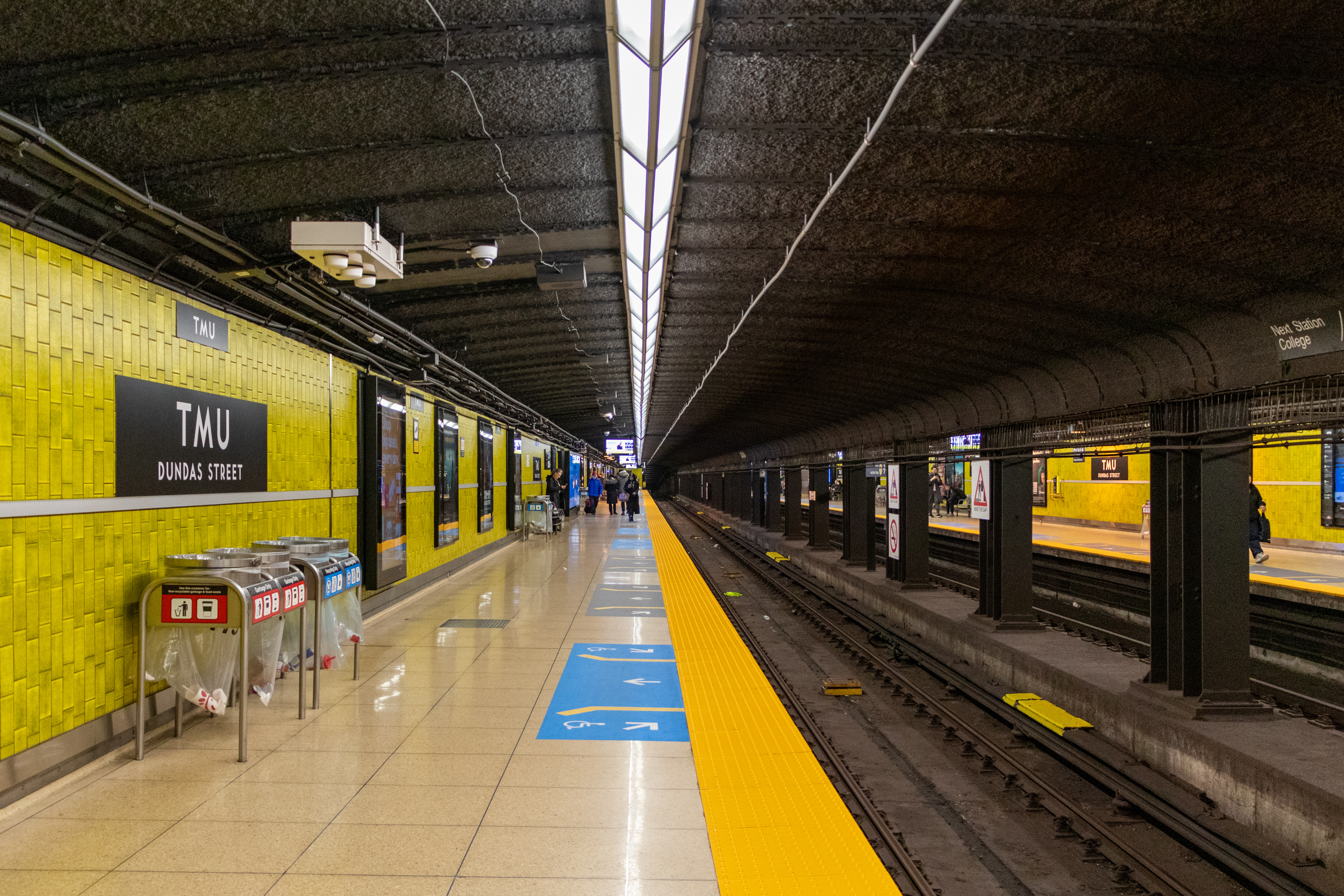
TMU station, renamed from Dundas station in 2025

As a result of the George Floyd protests, Toronto City Council indicated in 2020 that they intended to rename Dundas station because its namesake, Henry Dundas, delayed the British Empire's abolition of slavery in the 1700s. In May 2025, Toronto Metropolitan University (TMU) indicated it would pay for the name change if the station was renamed to recognize the university. In mid-November 2025, temporary signage at the station was added with the new TMU name; the station was officially renamed on December 7, 2025.

Platform wall sign in Downsview Park indicating Union as a terminal station

Southbound station platform signage on both branches indicates Union as a terminal station due to it being located at the southernmost point of the line's rough 'U' shape, where it turns northward when travelling along either branch. The train destination signs display the northwestern terminal station as Vaughan rather than its full name, Vaughan Metropolitan Centre, for brevity. Until the 1990s, train destination signs read "VIA DOWNTOWN" after the terminal station name.

== Service ==
=== Operation hours and frequency ===
As with other TTC subway lines, Line 1 operates most of the day and is generally closed between 2:00 a.m. and 6:00 a.m. on weekdays and Saturdays, and between 2 a.m. to 8 a.m. on Sunday. Trains arrive at stations every 2 to 3 minutes during peak periods and every 4 to 5 minutes during off-peak periods.

During the morning peak, from 6:00 am to 9:00 am Monday to Friday, half the trains are turned back at Glencairn station resulting in limited service north of that point. The turnback was moved from St. Clair West station to Glencairn station in 2016, and plans called for it to be moved farther to Pioneer Village station in December 2017 when the Line 1 extension opened.

Overnight service on the Yonge segment of the line is provided by 320 Yonge Blue Night from Queens Quay to Steeles Avenue with headways of 3 to 15 minutes. The University segment does not have an overnight service due to proximity to the 320 Yonge Blue Night between Union and St. George.

=== Rolling stock ===
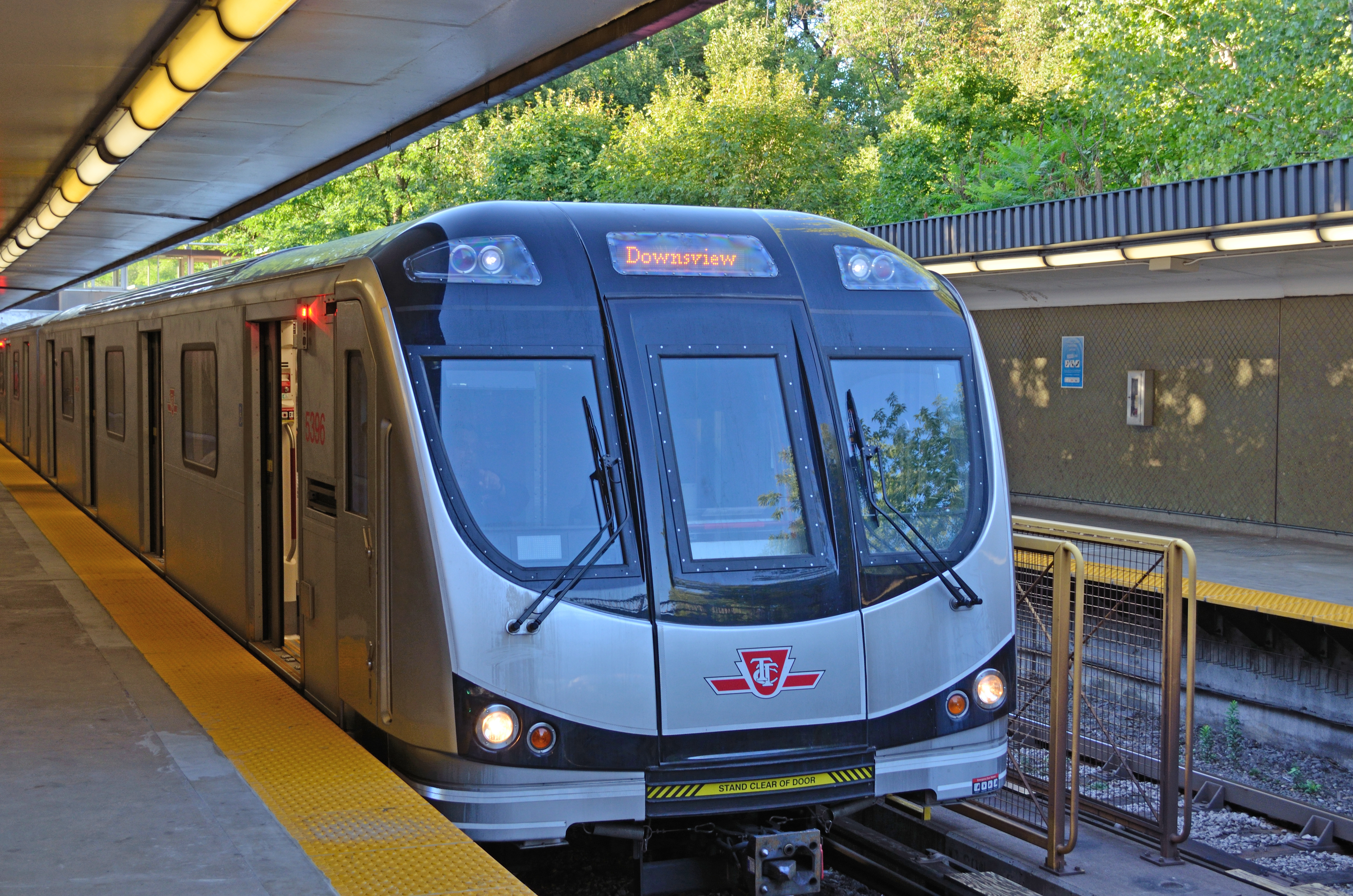
A Toronto Rocket train at Rosedale station

Line 1 is operated using only the TTC's Toronto Rocket (TR) subway trains, which are based on Bombardier's Movia family of trains. Unlike other trains in the Toronto subway rolling stock, the TR trains have a "six-car fixed" articulated configuration with full-open gangways, allowing passengers to walk freely from one end to the other. The TR trains were scheduled for delivery starting between late 2009 and early 2010, but was delayed until late 2010 due to production problems. They entered revenue service on this line on July 21, 2011, replacing the older H5 and the T1 series trains, which had been used on this line. (The T1 series trains, which used to operate on this line from 1995 until 2015, were transferred over to Line 2 Bloor–Danforth where they replaced the older H4 and H6 series trains).

From the line's opening in 1954 until 1990, it was operated with G-series cars, and was also served with a mix of M1 and H1/H2/H4 subway cars between 1965 and 1999.

=== One-person train operation ===
Between 2021 and 2022, the TTC transitioned its Line 1 trains to one-person train operation (OPTO), which removes the secondary guard member – stationed at the rear end of the trains – who operated the doors. This change leaves only the subway drivers at the front to fill the dual role in 2023. OPTO went into effect between St. George and Vaughan Metropolitan Centre stations in November 2021, and was rolled out on the rest of the line effective November 20, 2022.

=== Gap trains ===
Gap trains are empty trains stored on pocket tracks and brought into service in a gap between full-route trains to relieve overcrowding. In October 2018, the TTC restarted the practice of using gap trains to relieve crowding at Bloor–Yonge and St. George stations, where respectively 225,000 and 135,000 passengers transfer trains daily. The TTC observed that one empty gap train can clear a crowded platform at Bloor–Yonge.

The TTC had previously run gap trains prior to late 2017 but had discontinued the practice because of a "change in operating philosophy". The practice was reinstated in response to a potentially dangerous overcrowding incident that occurred at Bloor–Yonge in January 2018.

In October 2018, the TTC used three gap trains, which sat on pocket tracks near Davisville, Eglinton and York Mills stations and moved into southbound service when station over-crowding was detected. For November 2018, the TTC planned to run a fourth gap train, which would sit on either the pocket track between Lawrence West and Glencairn stations or the pocket track between Cedarvale (then known as Eglinton West) and St. Clair West stations, in the morning peak period plus another during the afternoon peak.

Gap trains can also increase the capacity of Line 1, which often runs above its scheduled capacity of 28,000 passengers per hour. To address that demand, the TTC normally runs an average of 25.5 trains per hour through Bloor–Yonge and St. George stations in the morning peak period. With three gap trains, it can run up to 28 trains per hour.

=== Automatic train control ===
Starting in the late 2010s, the TTC began converting its fixed-block signal system to a moving block—based automatic train control (ATC) system on Line 1 Yonge–University at a cost of $562.3 million. Work to convert the line to use ATC was completed in September 2022.

The benefits of ATC are:

- a reduced headway between trains from 2.5 minutes to 2 minutes during rush hours, allowing a 25 percent increase in the number of trains that can operate
- fewer signal-related delays relative to the old fixed-block system
- a more efficient use of electricity, thus reducing operational costs
- allowance for single-track, bidirectional operation for trains in passenger service, albeit with reduced frequency, which allow for off-hour maintenance of the opposite track

==== History ====
In 2009, the TTC awarded a contract to Alstom to upgrade the signalling system of the existing section of Line 1, as well as equip its Toronto–York Spadina subway extension (TYSSE) into Vaughan, with moving block–based communications-based train control (CBTC) by 2012. The estimated cost to implement ATC on Line 1 was $562 million, $424 million of which was funded by Metrolinx.

The first section of the Urbalis 400 ATC system on Line 1 entered revenue service on December 17, 2017, between Sheppard West and Vaughan stations, in conjunction with the opening of the extension project. On November 4, 2017, the TTC successfully completed a 13-day test of ATC with trains using it in regular service between Dupont and Yorkdale stations. At the conclusion of the test, the feature was turned off between these two stations to allow installation of ATC through the complex interchange at Wilson Yard.

ATC was permanently extended south to Dupont station on December 3, 2018; to St. Patrick station on May 12, 2019; to Queen station on February 24, 2020; to Rosedale station on November 21, 2020; to Eglinton station in October 2021; and finally to Finch station on September 24, 2022.

There was a phase 6 for fixes, improvements and enhancements, as well as an adjustment to ATC at Eglinton station to accommodate the shifting of the Line 1 platform north by 24 metres (79 ft) to accommodate connections to Line 5 Eglinton; this was completed by May 14, 2023.

Prior to September 2022, ATC was operating on 79 percent of Line 1, and the partial implementation of ATC had resulted in improvements. Trains travelled between Vaughan Metropolitan Centre and Rosedale stations 3.5 minutes faster. Just prior to 2020, ATC allowed for an 8 percent increase in trains per hour, and the number of trains scheduled in southbound service in the morning peak at Bloor–Yonge station increased from 22 to 25.5 trains per hour. Signal violations decreased by approximately 50 percent from 2017 to 2020.

Converting all of Line 1 to ATC required the installation of 2,000 beacons, 256 signals, and more than 300,000 metres (1,000,000 ft) of cable.

As of May 14, 2023, the timetable for ATC conversion on Line 1 was:

Phase	Location	Completion
1	Yorkdale station to Dupont station	2017 Q4
2A	Vaughan Metropolitan Centre station to Sheppard West station	2017 Q4
2B & 2C	Wilson Yard interface (Sheppard West station to Yorkdale station)	2018 Q4
3A	Dupont station to St. Patrick station	2019 Q2
3B	St. Patrick station to Queen station	2020 Q1
3C	Queen station to Rosedale station	2020 Q4
4	Rosedale station to Eglinton station	2021 Q3
5	Eglinton station to Finch station	2022 Q3
6	Adjustments to ATC	2023 Q2

== See also ==
- MoveOntario 2020
- Yonge streetcar line – Predecessor to the Yonge portion of Line 1 that operated as part of the Toronto streetcar system
