= Summerhill station =

Toronto subway station

Summerhill
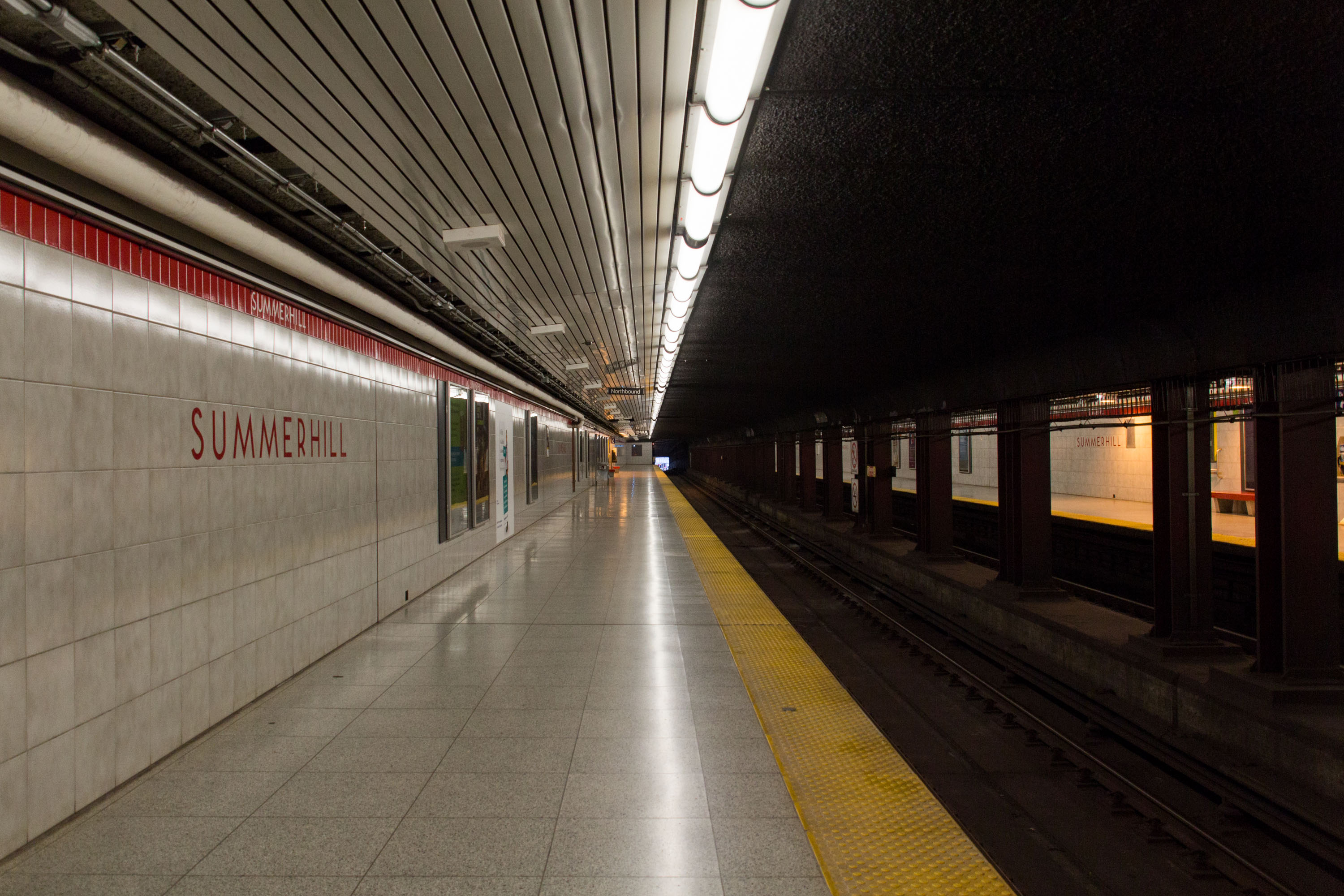

General information
- Location: 16 Shaftesbury Avenue; Toronto, Ontario; Canada
- Coordinates: 43°40′54″N 79°23′26″W
- Platforms: Side platforms
- Tracks: 2
- Connections: TTC buses: 97 Yonge; 320 Yonge

Construction
- Structure type: Underground
- Accessible: Yes

Other information
- Website: Official station page

History
- Opened: March 30, 1954; 72 years ago

Passengers
- 2023–2024: 5,045
- Rank: 67 of 70

Services
Preceding station	Toronto Transit Commission	Following station
Rosedale towards Vaughan	Line 1 Yonge–University	St. Clair towards Finch
Location

Summerhill is a subway station on the Yonge–University line in Toronto, Ontario, Canada. It is located on Shaftesbury Avenue just east of Yonge Street, with the entrance being at the north end of the train platforms.

With an average daily ridership of 5,045, Summerhill – much like its southern neighbour, Rosedale – is one of the subway system's least-frequented stations. Because it has no major bus connections and no significant attractions nearby, the station relies almost entirely on the surrounding Summerhill neighbourhood for its passenger volume.

== History ==
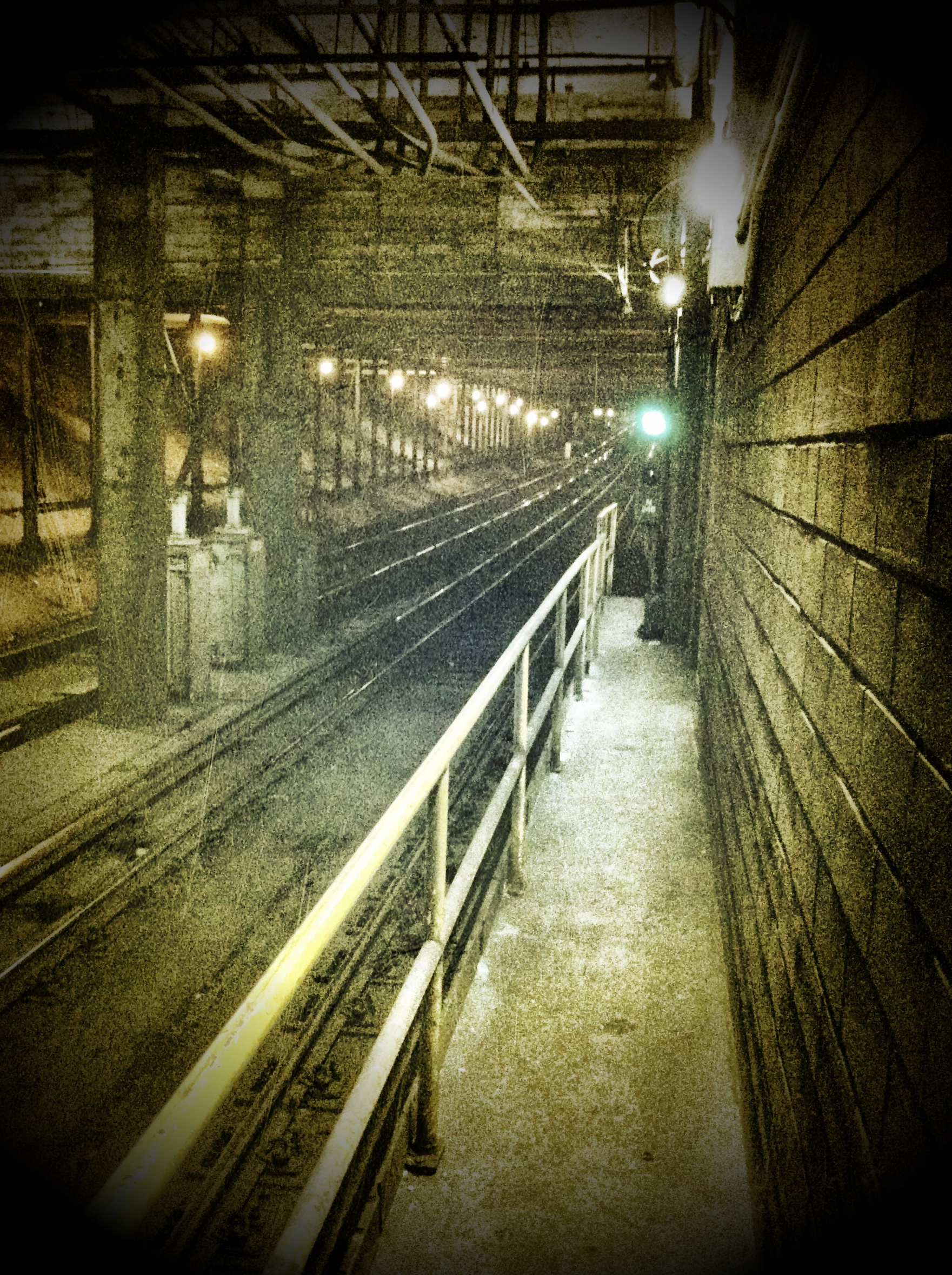
Covered original open cut north of the station

Summerhill station opened in 1954 as part of the original Yonge line.

The tunnel connecting Summerhill station with St. Clair station (which is the next station north) originally ended immediately north of the station at Summerhill Avenue and continued in an open cut as far as Pleasant Boulevard. Various sections of this open cut were roofed over as the years passed, and since the early 1980s it has been entirely under cover, except when one block was opened to allow new construction above it. Passengers who look out from the train into the tunnel on this section can still see the sloping sides of the original cut, the stumps of lamp posts and trees, and the undersides of six bridges which still carry six streets (Woodlawn, Summerhill, Shaftesbury, Scrivener, Price and Rowanwood streets) over the line.

South of the station, the tunnel emerges to the surface at Rowanwood Drive. Originally, the line surfaced at Price Portal, but a one-block section from Rowanwood Drive to Price Street was roofed over in 2002 for parking.

In a February 2020 meeting of the TTC board, the TTC proposed a secondary exit for emergency use. The station entrance is at the north end of the station. The proposed exit would be at the south end of the station and emerge to the surface at Scrivener Square. There would be underground corridors to connect the platforms to the new exit, with one corridor running under the subway tracks from the northbound platform to the west side of the tracks.

Accessibility upgrades at the station began in the fourth quarter of 2021 and included the installation of elevators connecting the north and south platforms to the street-level concourse. Construction was completed in December 2025, rendering the station fully accessible.

== Nearby landmarks ==
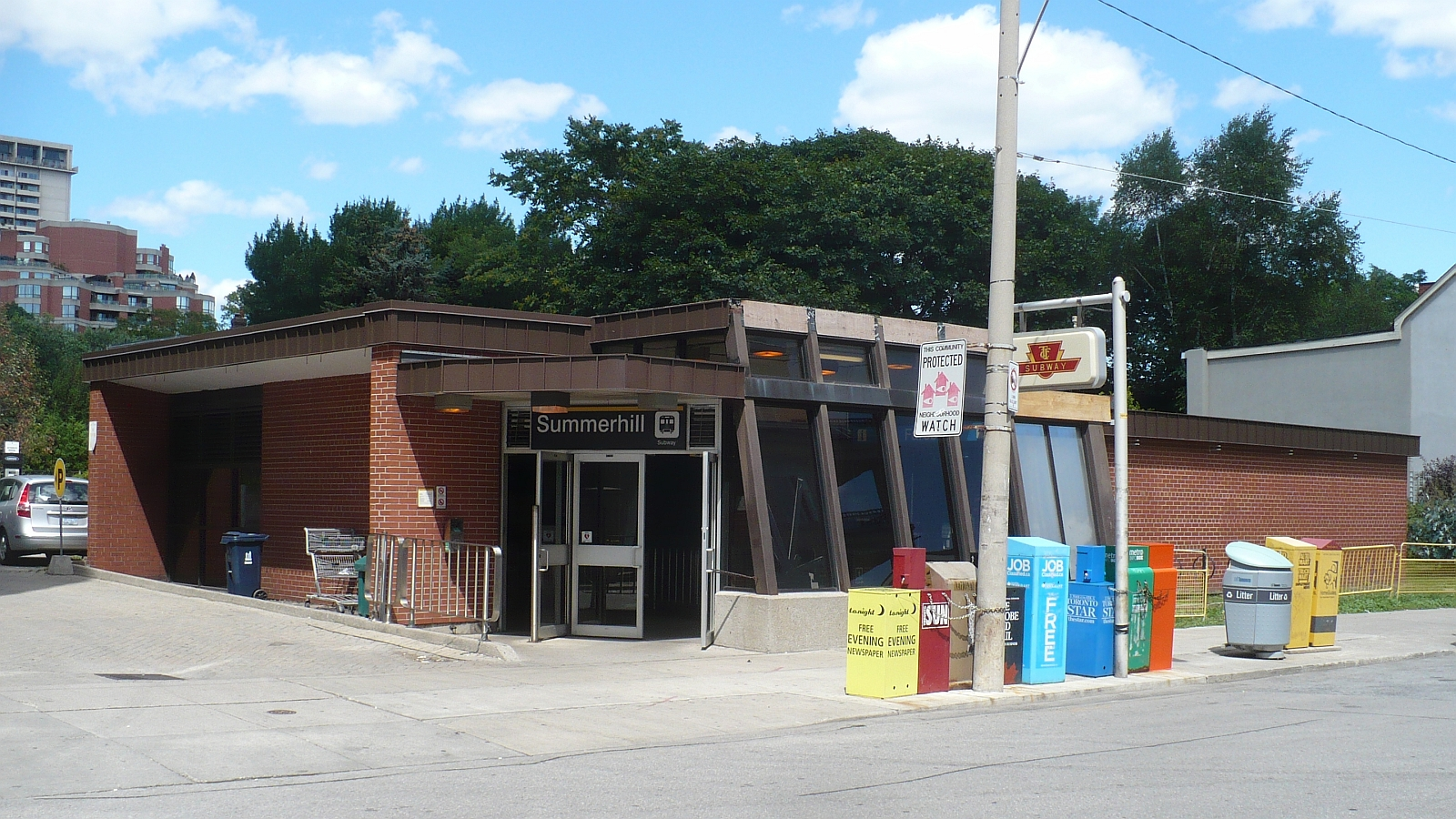
The former station entrance

- The Catholic Pastoral Centre, which includes the offices of the Roman Catholic Archdiocese of Toronto, is on the northeast corner of Yonge and Shaftesbury beside the station entrance.
- Just south of the station is the Canadian Pacific Railway’s former North Toronto station, now restored and repurposed as an LCBO liquor store. GO Transit’s Midtown line, proposed as recently as 2000 but not a current priority, would have seen that station reopened and served by commuter trains, bypassing Toronto's downtown Union Station, which would have turned Summerhill into a major interchange between local public transport and mainline railways.
- The station is a meeting point for walking clubs heading east to the Rosedale Ravine via a staircase from Shaftesbury Avenue down to David A. Balfour Park.
- The Toronto Lawn Tennis Club is also nearby.

== Surface connections ==
All connecting bus routes require a transfer and can be boarded at curbside stops.

TTC routes serving the station include:

Route	Name	Additional information
97C	Yonge	Northbound to Eglinton station and southbound to Union station
320	Yonge	Blue Night service; northbound to Steeles Avenue and southbound to Queens Quay
