= Rosedale station (Toronto) =

Toronto subway station

Rosedale
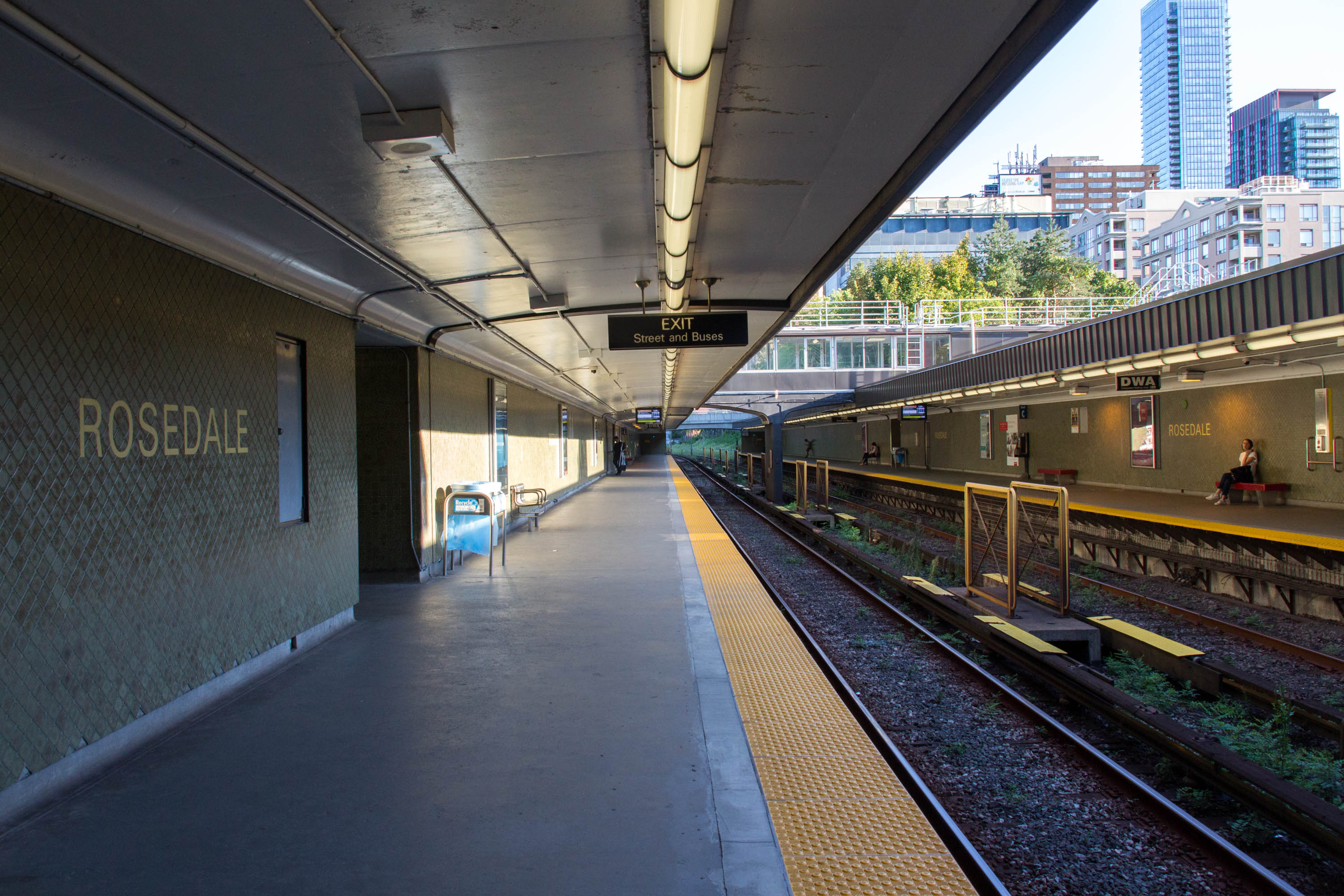

General information
- Location: 7 Crescent Road; Toronto, Ontario; Canada
- Coordinates: 43°40′35″N 79°23′19″W
- Platforms: Side platforms
- Tracks: 2
- Connections: TTC buses: 82 Rosedale; 97 Yonge; 320 Yonge

Construction
- Structure type: Open cut
- Accessible: Yes
- Architect: John B. Parkin

Other information
- Website: Official station page

History
- Opened: March 30, 1954; 72 years ago
- Former names: Crescent

Passengers
- 2023–2024: 4,875
- Rank: 68 of 70

Services
Preceding station	Toronto Transit Commission	Following station
Bloor towards Vaughan	Line 1 Yonge–University	Summerhill towards Finch

Ontario Heritage Act
- Designated: August 13, 1990
Location

Rosedale is a Toronto subway station on Line 1 Yonge–University in Toronto, Ontario, Canada. It is located on the east side of Yonge Street at Crescent Road.

Despite its proximity to downtown Toronto, Rosedale is one of the least-used stations in the subway system, averaging 4,875 daily riders between 2023 and 2024. This low ridership is largely due to a lack of high-volume bus routes connecting to the station, coupled with the nearby Rosedale neighbourhood's sparse population and lack of major attractions.

There is only one entrance to the station, the entrance acts as the concourse, and the subway platforms are directly below. Wi-Fi service is available at this station.

As of 2022, construction had started to install two elevators to make Rosedale station accessible. The elevators connect the street-level concourse to each of the north- and southbound platforms. The elevators were put into service in early October 2025, with minor work planned to continue into the first quarter of 2026.

== Architecture ==
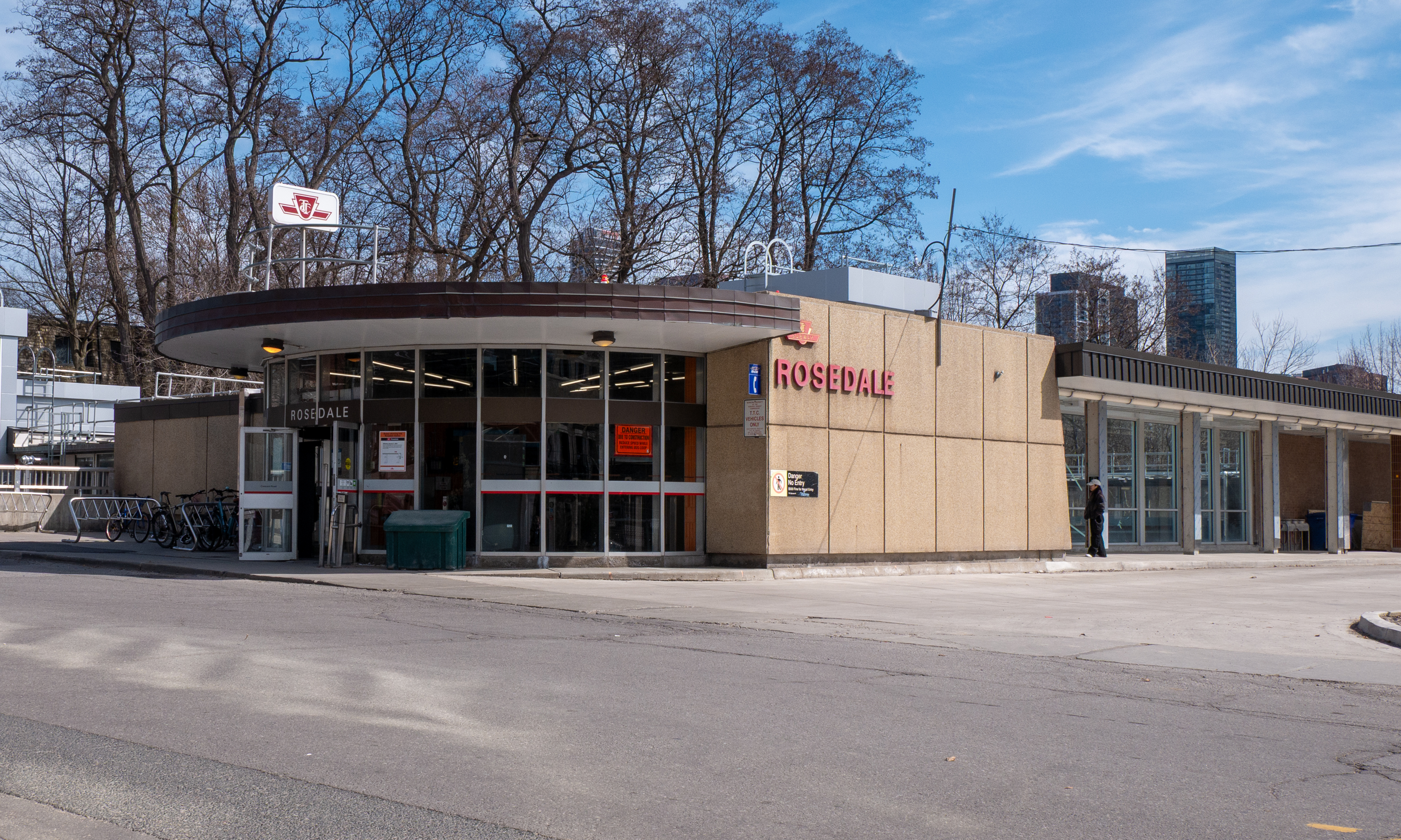
Entrance to Rosedale station

This open-air station has separate canopies over the two platforms. Two pedestrian bridges allow access to the northbound platform on the east side, one from the main entrance off Crescent Road and the other from the bus platforms on the west side of the station.

The station, designed by John B. Parkin in 1947 and opened in 1954, was designated as a heritage property under Part IV of the Ontario Heritage Act by City of Toronto By-law 440-90, passed August 13, 1990. Despite the station's heritage designation, the original large green-blue Vitrolite panels and black trim on the platform walls were replaced by small square dark green tiles in a unique criss-cross pattern with yellow lettering and no trim.

== Subway infrastructure in the vicinity ==
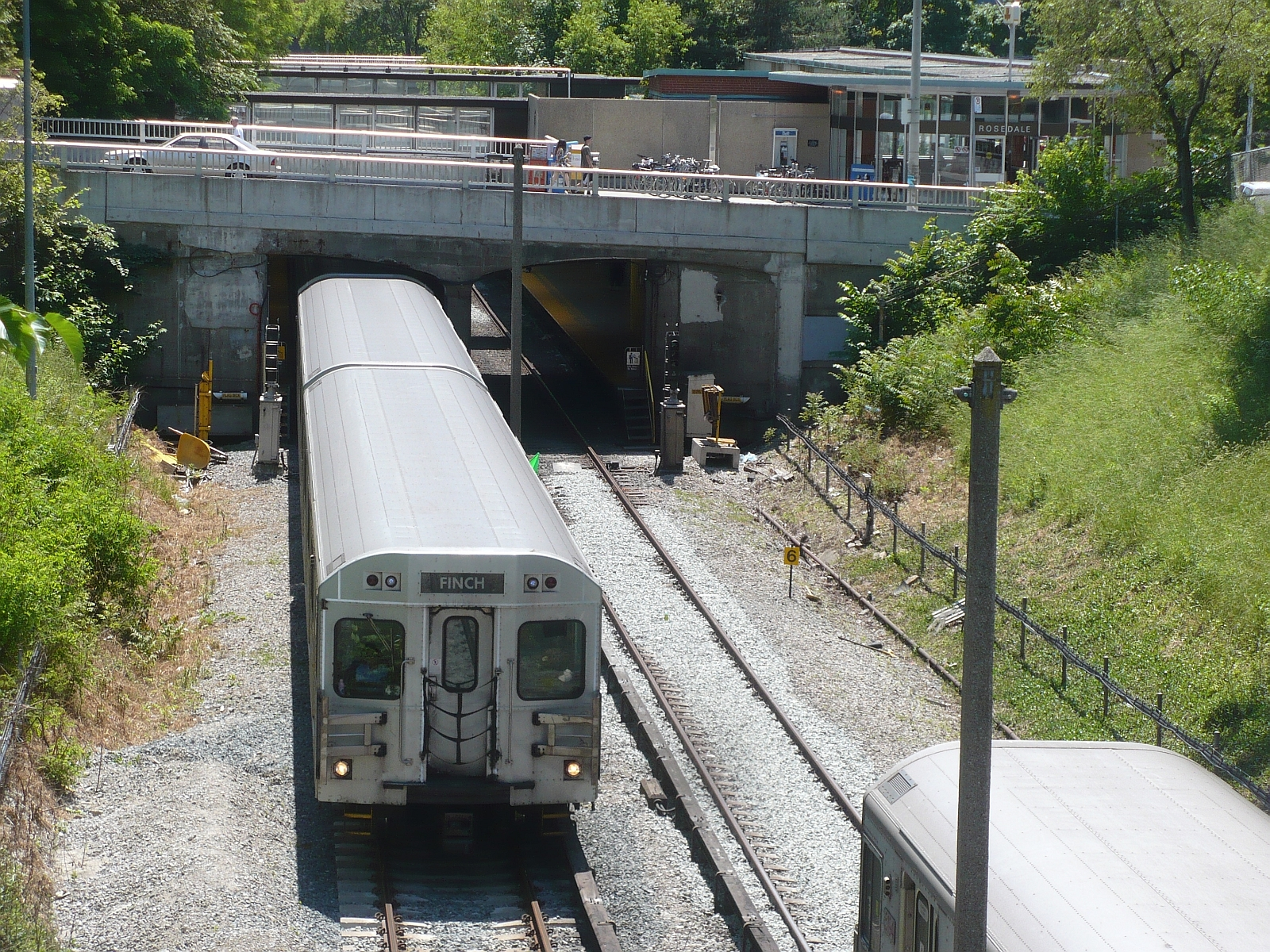
Tracks in open cut north of the station

After leaving Bloor station northbound, the Yonge–University line crosses under Church Street in a tunnel and emerges to the surface at the Ellis Portal, running in a cutting through Rosedale station. Originally the line continued north in open cut all the way to the Price Portal, where the tunnel resumed, but a one-block section from Rowanwood Drive to Price was roofed over in 2002 for parking.

== Budd Sugarman Park ==
Budd Sugarman Park
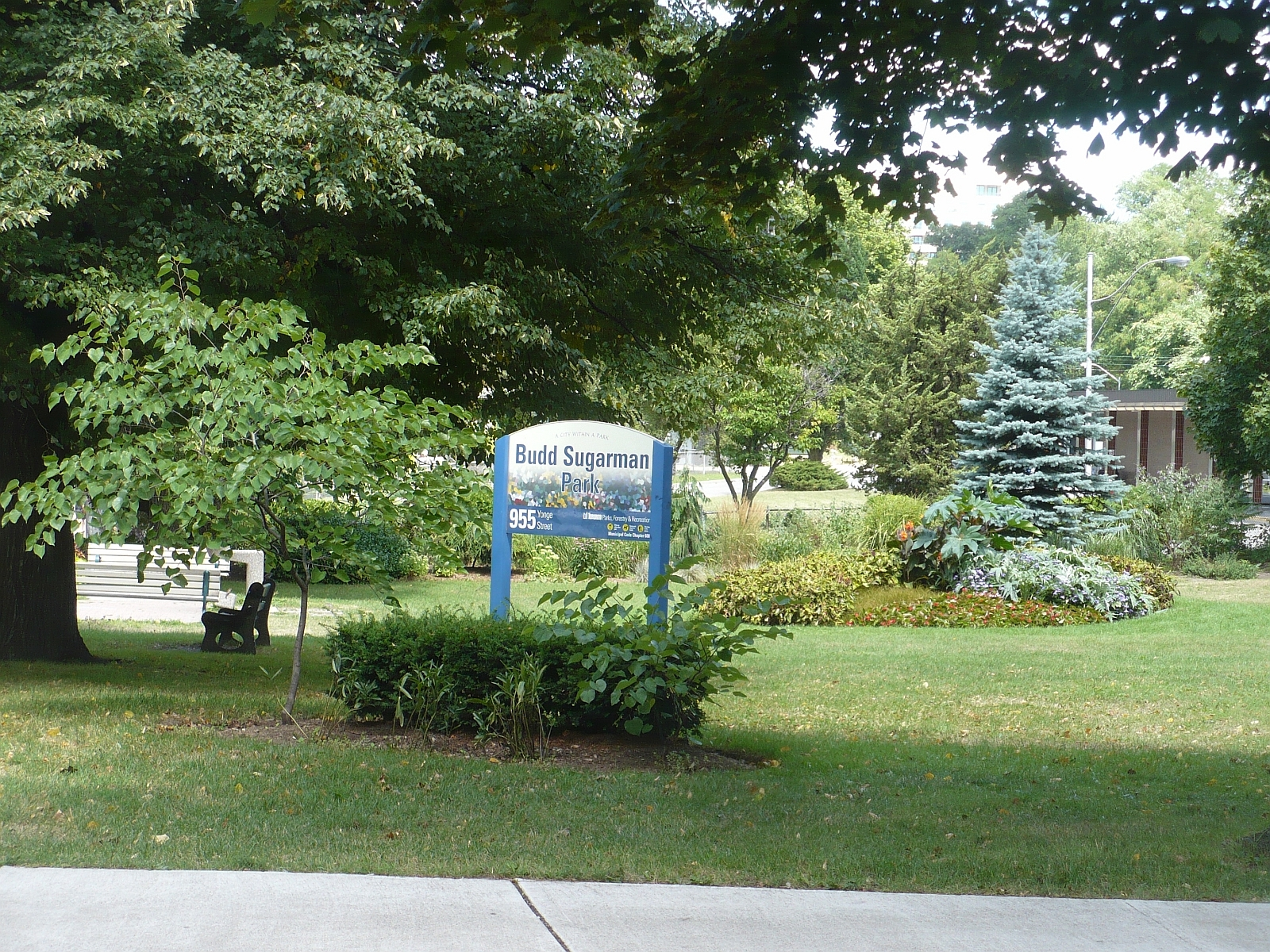
- Interactive map of Budd Sugarman Park
- Location: 955 Yonge Street
- Coordinates: 43°40′33″N 79°23′20″W
- Website: Park

The southwesterly portion of the property, which is surplus to the needs of the TTC for use as part of the subway or bus station, has been developed as a public park. The park is named in honour of the civic activist Budd Sugarman, who died in 2004. In 2008, the City of Toronto, Parks, Forestry and Recreation Division proposed an expansion of the park along Yonge Street and a reconfiguration of the bus loop. This was rejected by the TTC on the grounds that it would negatively affect passengers and bus operations, while providing no transit benefits, and eliminate any potential long-term development of the site, which is contrary to a stated policy of encouraging development at subway stations.

== Nearby landmarks ==
Nearby landmarks include Ramsden Park and the Studio Building.

== Surface connections ==
TTC routes with a connection to the station include:

Bay number	Route	Name	Additional information
1	Unloading		
2	82	Rosedale	Eastbound to Summerhill Avenue
N/A	97C	Yonge	Northbound to Eglinton station and southbound to Union station (On-street stop outside station)
N/A	320	Yonge	Blue Night service; northbound to Steeles Avenue and southbound to Queens Quay (On-street stop outside station)
