= Cedarvale Park (Toronto) =

Park in Toronto, Ontario, Canada

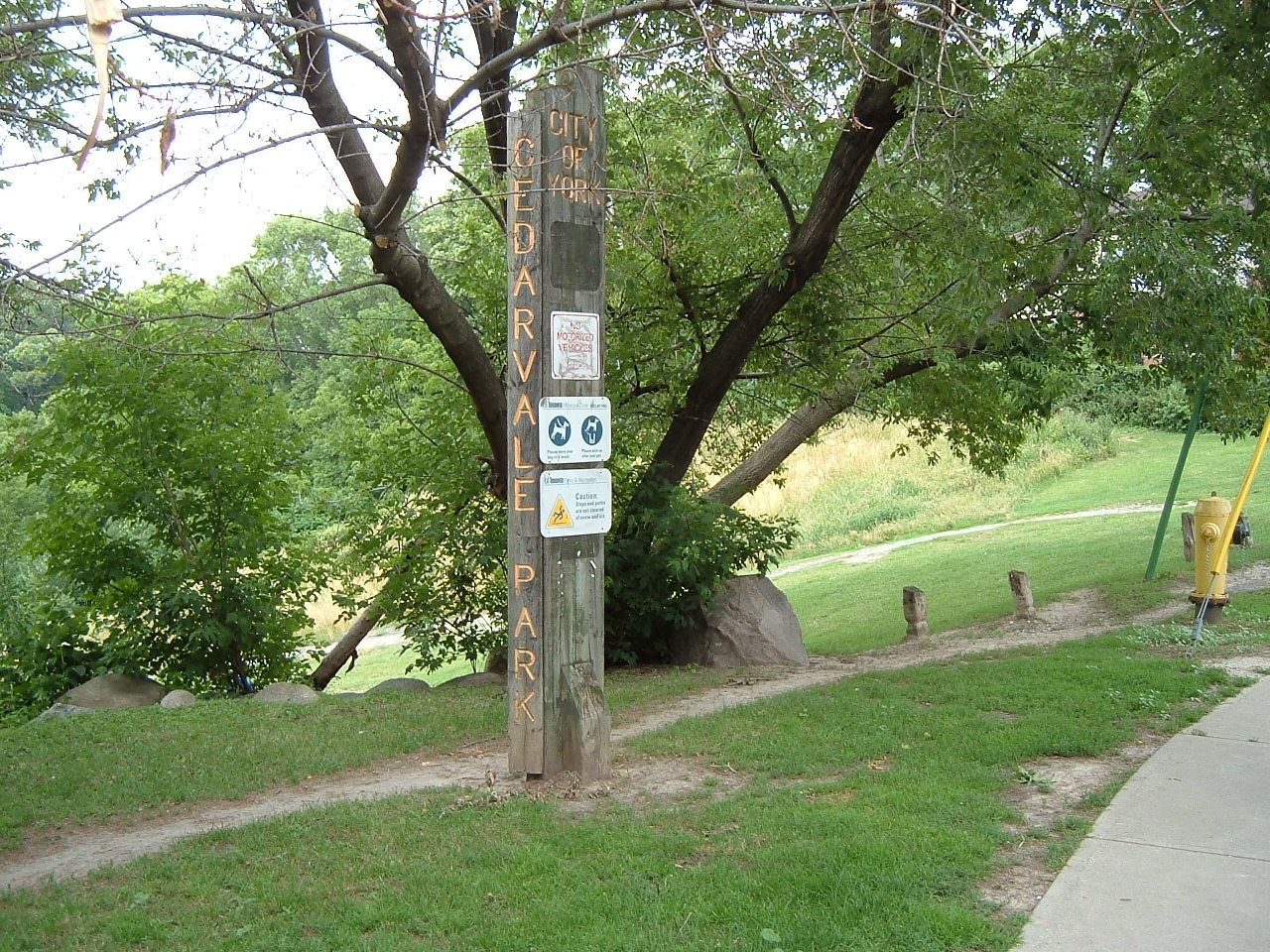
- Old City of York sign for the park

- Location within Toronto
- Interactive map of Cedarvale Park
- Type: Public Park
- Location: Toronto, Ontario, Canada
- Coordinates: 43°41′29″N 79°25′35″W
- Operator: City of Toronto

Cedarvale Park (originally known as Cedar Vale) is a park located in Toronto, Ontario, Canada. It is bordered by very steep hills, and is located in the Cedarvale neighbourhood of Toronto. The Line 1 Yonge–University subway tunnels underneath it, between St. Clair West and Cedarvale stations; there are several TTC emergency exits in the park. The north end of the park contains the Phil White (Cedarvale) Arena and The Leo Baeck Day School, formerly Arlington Middle School. It is commonly used by dog walkers and students returning from the nearby school. The park contains a cricket pitch and soccer goals as permanent fixtures. In the winter, the larger hills within the park are used for tobogganing.

Midway through the park the Glen Cedar Pedestrian Bridge straddles the ravine with an impressive view and is designated as an Ontario Heritage Property. Originally part of Sir Henry Pellatt's (of Casa Loma fame) plan for a high end subdivision to be called "Cedar Vale", the bridge was eventually closed due to disrepair but was restored in 1989 as a pedestrian crossing.

South of the fields, the park angles southeast, and becomes more of a deep, naturalized ravine with steep sides, with a heavily used footpath down the middle. Cedarvale ravine contains very sizable cattail wetlands east of Bathurst Street in Forest Hill; the remainder of the natural portion is young regrowth forest (the ravine was largely clearcut during the construction ahead of the proposed Spadina Subway in the 1970s, which was cancelled). The path is heavily used and remains passable even in winter, with foot traffic packing snow down despite the lack of plowing, especially after drainage works in 2006 fixed water pooling and subsequent ice buildup.

The park benefits from its proximity to the Beltline trail in the north and the Nordheimer Ravine to the south; these join to form a large trail system through midtown Toronto.

The southern entrance of the park is adjacent to a St. Clair West subway station entrance, and an outdoor gym constructed by Trekfit.

== History ==
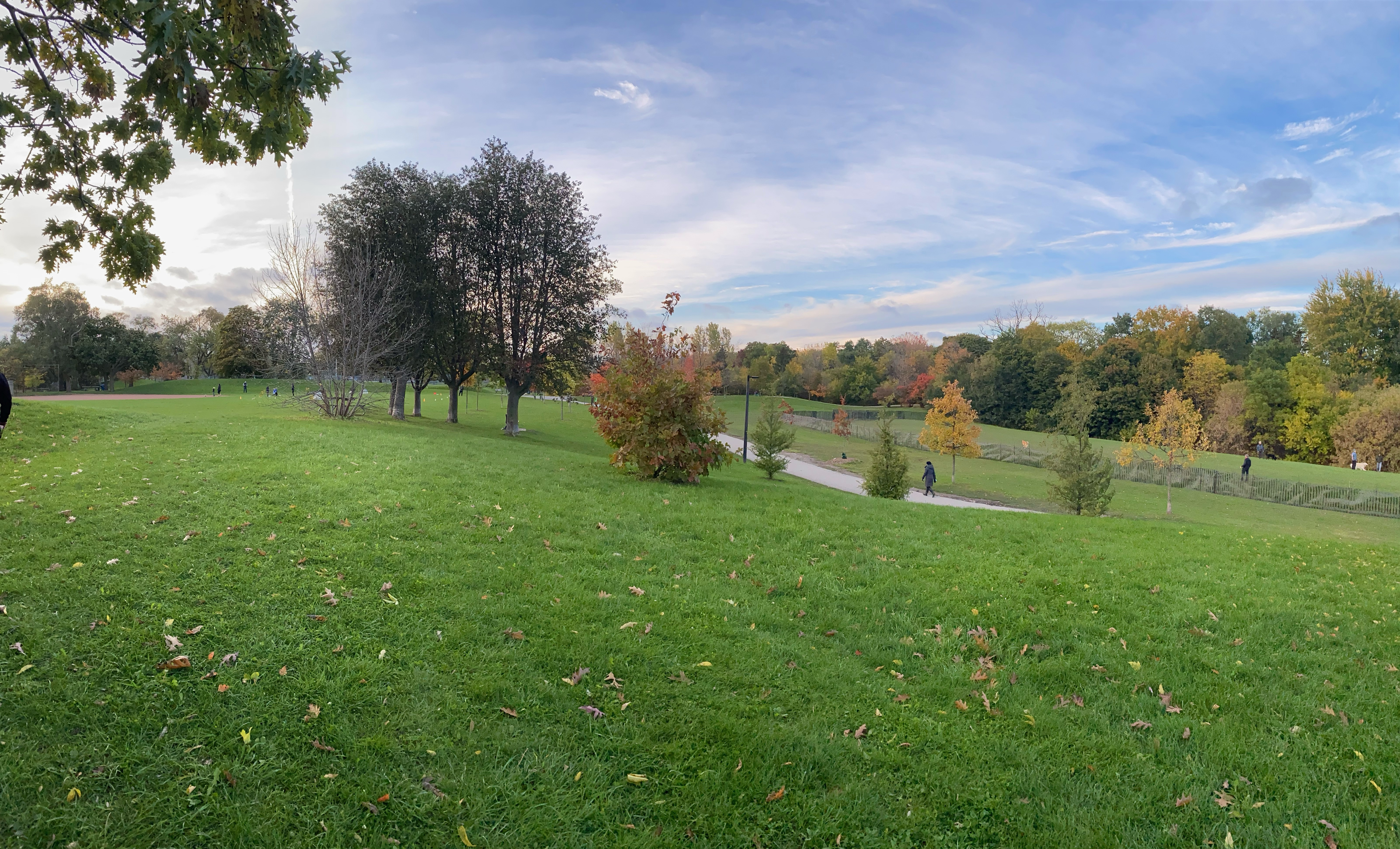
Cedarvale Ravine in 2021

A creek, Castle Frank Brook, used to run through Cedarvale Park, but it is now completely buried. Ernest Hemingway, an American novelist, often frequented this park's path, which was then used as a cattle path, during his stay in Canada. There were plans in the 1920s and the 1930s to build mansions in the ravine, but the Great Depression in the 1930s halted its construction. The Glen Cedar bridge that spans the ravine portion of the park was built during that time and restored in 1989, after being rescued from demolition. In the 1960s and 1970s, there were plans to build the Spadina Expressway through Cedarvale Park but Jane Jacobs successfully lobbied against the government to halt its construction project. Cedarvale Park is located on the right-of-way for the cancelled Spadina Expressway south of Eglinton that was transferred to the province of Ontario in return for the building of Black Creek Drive.

Since the 2000s, increasing ecological awareness has changed priorities within the park, with renaturalization projects already underway on slopes near the north end of the park.

Cedarvale Ravine has a permanent off-leash area for dogs, but leashes are required in all other areas. Following a string of dog attacks in Cedarvale Ravine, the park is now frequented by bylaw officers who will ticket the owners of off-leash dogs outside the designated area.
