= Humewood–Cedarvale =

- Neighbourhood
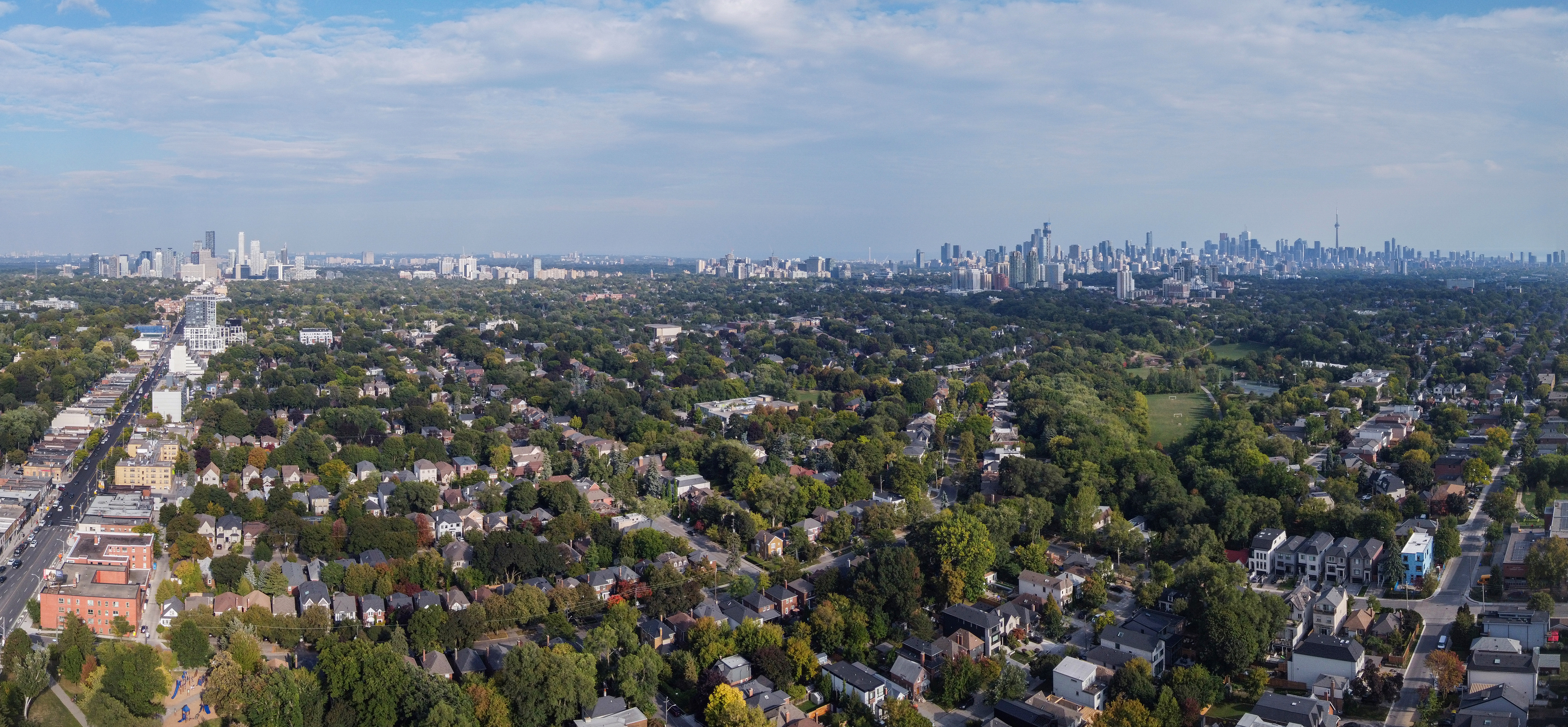
- Aerial view of Humewood–Cedarvale in 2025

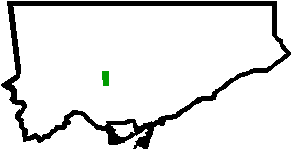
- Location of Humewood–Cedarvale within Toronto
- Coordinates: 43°41′28″N 79°25′33″W
- Country: Canada
- Province: Ontario
- City: Toronto
- Established: 1850 (York Township)
- Changed municipality: 1998 Toronto from York

Government
  - MP: Leslie Church (St. Paul's)
  - MPP: Stephanie Smyth (St. Paul's)
  - Councillor: Josh Matlow (Ward 12 St. Paul's)

Humewood–Cedarvale is an area of Toronto, Ontario, Canada, consisting of Humewood in the south and Cedarvale in the north, divided by Vaughan Road and Cedarvale Ravine. The neighbourhood is bordered by Bathurst Street on the east, Eglinton Avenue to the north, Arlington Avenue to the west, and St. Clair Avenue to the south. Humewood has also been known as "the Woods" because of its many streets that have names ending with "-wood", including Wychwood, Humewood, Cherrywood, Valewood, Maplewood, Wellwood, Kenwood, and Pinewood. The neighbourhood's main commercial areas are along St. Clair Ave. W., referred to as Hillcrest Village and along Eglinton Ave. W..

== Character ==
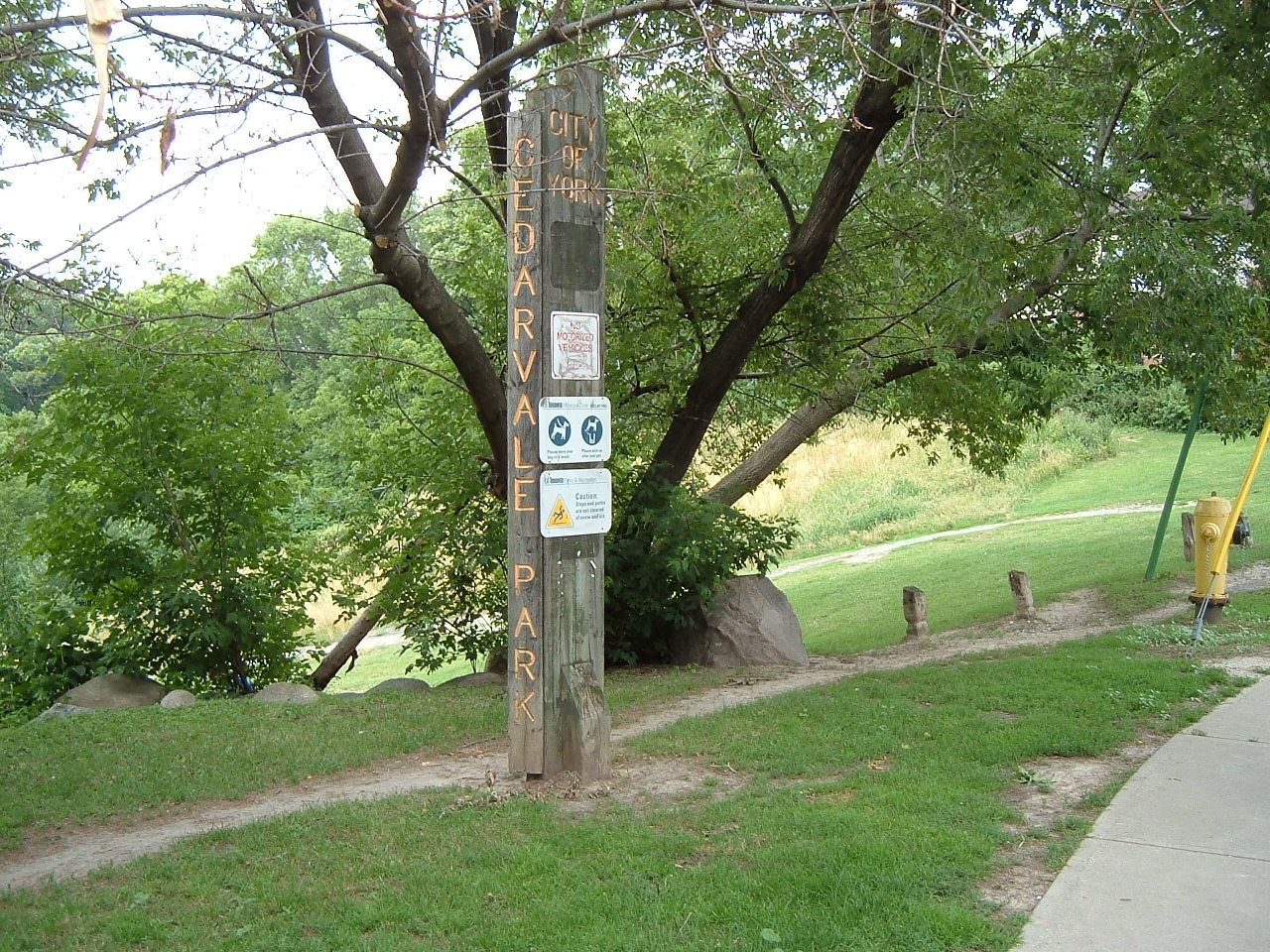
Cedarvale Park and its surrounding Castle Frank ravine acts as a natural border between the neighbourhoods of Humewood and Cedarvale.

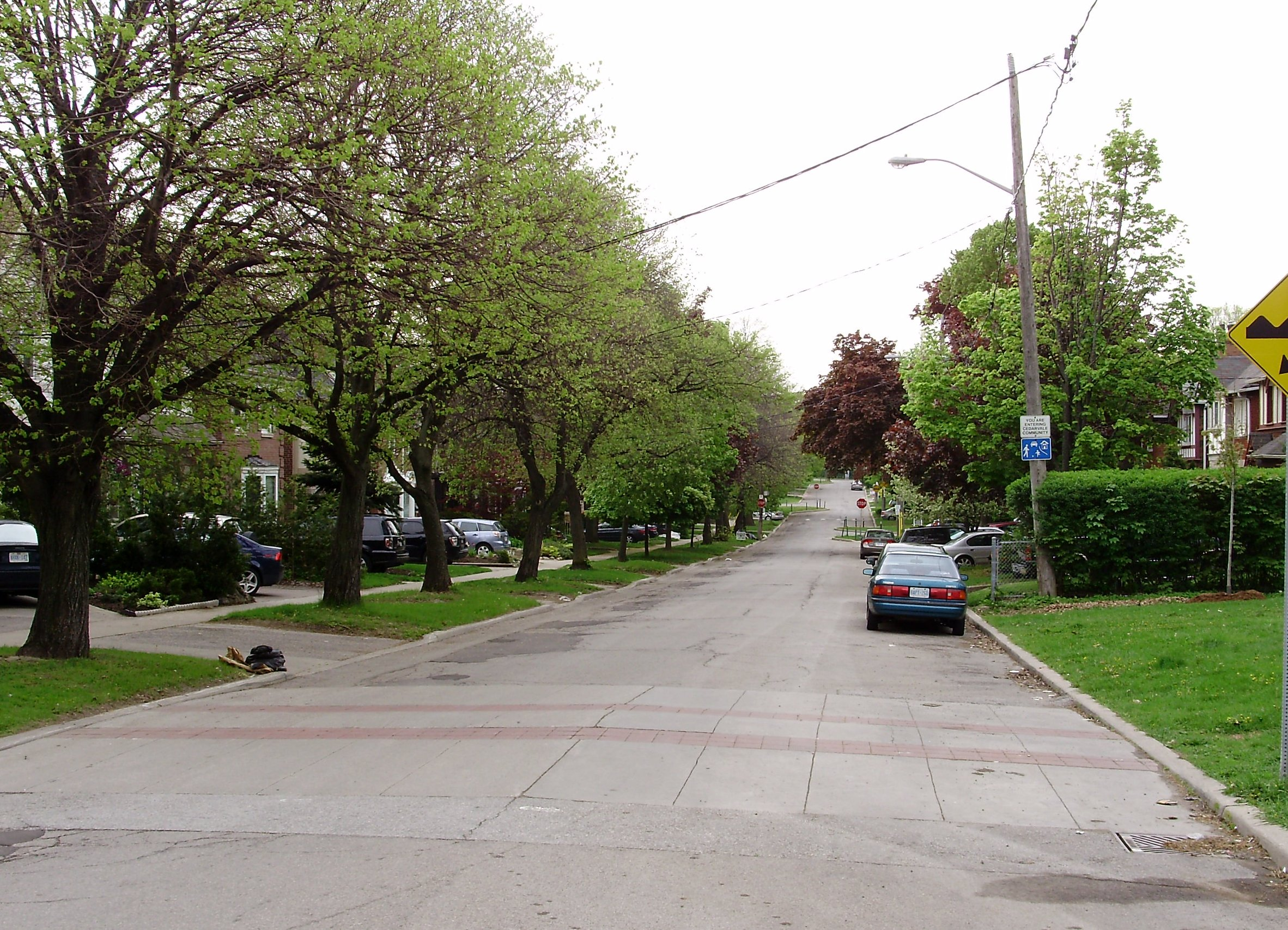
Strathearn Road in Cedarvale

Humewood is a lower- to upper-middle class, family-oriented neighbourhood, with a combination of single-family homes dating from the 1920s as well as a numerous mid-rise and high-rise buildings. Humewood Park, just north of St. Clair Ave. W, was once part of the estate of William Hume Blake, the namesake of the Humewood neighbourhood. Cedarvale is a lower middle class to wealthy family-oriented community and includes modest single family homes from the 1940s as well as some multimillion-dollar homes facing the ravine that is within the Cedarvale Park and Castle Frank Brook's ravine system.

Cedarvale and Humewood are separated by Vaughan Road, and about a block further east is Cedarvale Ravine, a natural border between the two halves of the community.

== Demographics ==
While ethnically diverse like the rest of Toronto, there is a significant Jewish community in Humewood–Cedarvale, along with several key religious sites within walking distance (Holy Blossom Temple, Beth Tzedec Synagogue, The Village Shul, Beth Sholom Congregation, Chabad of Midtown and multiple Jewish day schools). The most common mother tongue is English (about 66% in 2011), followed by Tagalog/Filipino (3.5% in 2011).

Estimates of ethnic origin by world region in Humewood–Cedarvale:

- 69% European
- 19% Other North American
- 16% Southeast & East Asian
- 5% African
- 5% Central, South & Latin American
- 4% Caribbean
- 3% South Asian
- 3% West Central Asian & Middle Eastern
- 2% North American Indigenous
- <1% Oceania

The above estimates are based on the 2016 Canadian census; respondents to the census can identify with more than one ethnic origin, so the above figures can sum to more than 100%.

Estimates of Household Mean Income:

- One-person households: C$42,680
- Two-or-more person households: C$161,885

== Education ==
=== Public ===
There are two English public education elementary schools in Humewood–Cedarvale operated by the Toronto District School Board, Humewood and Cedarvale Community Schools, which represent the namesake portions of this neighbourhood. TDSB does not operate any secondary schools in the neighbourhood, with public secondary schooling provided by nearby TDSB institutions including, Oakwood Collegiate Institute, Forest Hill Collegiate Institute, and Harbord Collegiate Institute. Humewood Community school has a very successful, albeit optional, French program.

In addition to the Toronto District School Board, three other public school boards also operate in the city. The Toronto Catholic District School Board (TCDSB), is a public English separate school board; Conseil scolaire Viamonde is a secular French public school board; and the Conseil scolaire de district catholique Centre-Sud is a French separate public school board. However, none of the three school boards operate a school in the neighbourhood.

Additionally, there are no public libraries in this neighbourhood, but one may use the Oakwood Village, Maria Shchuka, Wychwood, St. Clair-Dufferin or Forest Hill public libraries.

=== Private ===
Two private elementary institutions are based in the neighbourhood, The Leo Baeck Day School, a private, Reform Jewish day school and Robbins Hebrew Academy, a private Conservative Jewish day school are also located in this community.

== Transportation ==
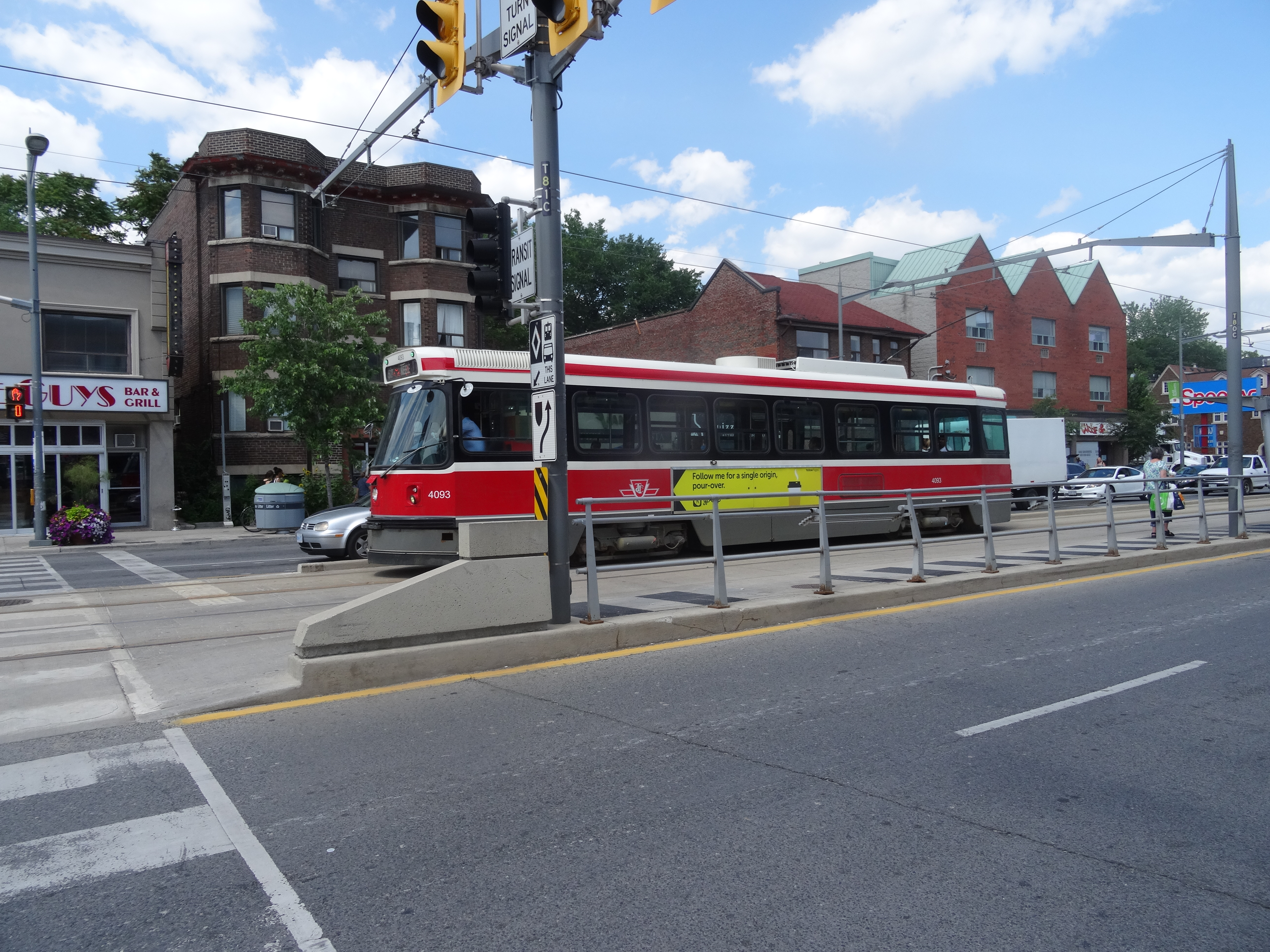
The TTC operates several transit lines in the area, including the 512 St. Clair streetcar line.

Public transportation accessible by two subway stations: Cedarvale and St. Clair West, as well as the St. Clair West 512 Streetcar and the 90 Vaughan bus route.

== Nearby Neighbourhoods ==
- Oakwood Village
