= St. Clair West station =

Toronto subway station

St. Clair West
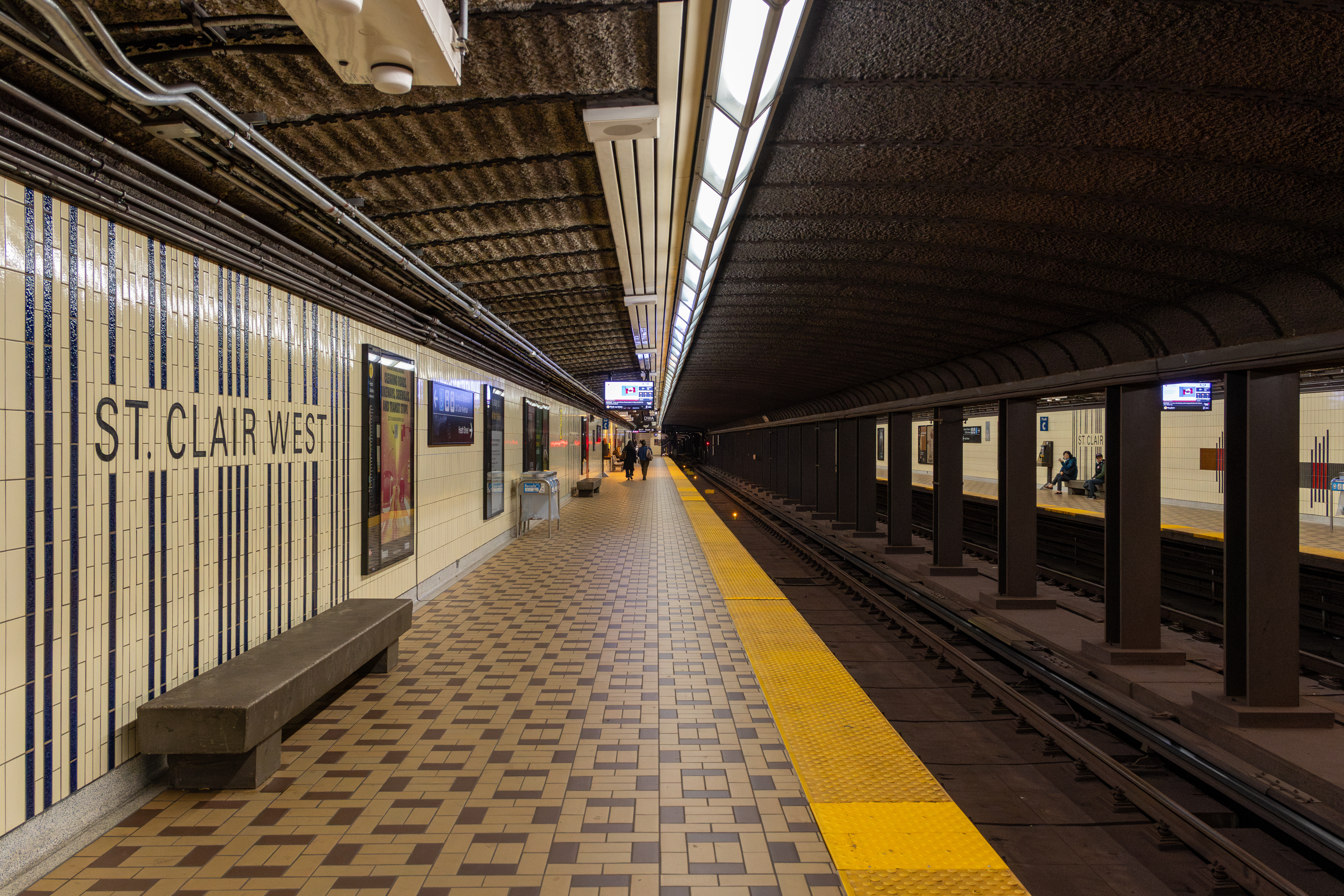

General information
- Location: 370 St. Clair Avenue West; Toronto, Ontario; Canada
- Coordinates: 43°41′06″N 79°24′57″W
- Platforms: Side platforms
- Tracks: 2
- Connections: TTC buses and streetcars: 7 Bathurst; 33 Forest Hill; 90 Vaughan; 126 Christie; 307 Bathurst; 312 St Clair; 512 St Clair

Construction
- Structure type: Underground
- Accessible: Yes
- Architect: TTC in house architects

Other information
- Website: Official station page

History
- Opened: January 28, 1978; 48 years ago

Passengers
- 2023–2024: 21,013
- Rank: 30 of 70

Services
Preceding station	Toronto Transit Commission	Following station
Cedarvale towards Vaughan	Line 1 Yonge–University	Dupont towards Finch
Bathurst Street towards Gunns Loop	512 St. Clair	Tweedsmuir Avenue towards St. Clair
Location

St. Clair West is a subway station on Line 1 Yonge–University in Toronto, Ontario, Canada. It spans the block north of St. Clair Avenue West to Heath Street, between Bathurst Street and Tweedsmuir Avenue. The station serves the local communities of Forest Hill South, Humewood, Bracondale Hill and Casa Loma.

The addition of automatic sliding doors, accessible fare gates, and elevators made the station fully accessible in 2017.

== History ==
This station was opened in 1978, as part of the subway line extension from St. George station to Wilson Station. Its south end was in the City of Toronto while its north end was in what was then the Borough of York.

The sports field of St. Michael's College School is directly above the length of the station and a Loblaws supermarket is located over the entrance on the north side of St. Clair Avenue.

The 1995 Russell Hill subway incident occurred on August 11, 1995, between this station and Dupont station to the south on the southbound line.

On September 3, 2017, the new Flexity Outlook streetcars were introduced to the 512 St. Clair streetcar route. Because the new streetcars are twice the length of the older CLRV streetcars, the underground platform assignments for streetcars at St. Clair West station had to be changed. Previously, streetcars for both directions shared the west-side platform for arrivals and the north-side platform for departures, each able to accommodate two CLRV streetcars. Now the west-side platform handles arrivals and departures for one eastbound streetcar, and the north-side platform for one westbound streetcar.

The streetcar tracks in the station were replaced in 2024; power and structural upgrades were performed as part of the same project.

== Entrances ==
The station has three entrances:

- The main entrance is located at on the north side of St. Clair Avenue West, about 240 metres (790 ft) east of Bathurst Street beside a Loblaws. It is the only accessible entrance. An elevator, escalators and stairs lead to the fare gate on the bus and streetcar level.
- Opposite the main entrance, on the south side of the street near Wells Hill Avenue, an entrance with escalators and stairs leads via tunnel to a fare gate on the south concourse level.
- An unstaffed automatic entrance is located on Heath Street adjacent to Tichester Road just east of Bathurst Street. This entrance has an elevator from street level to the concourse level but not to the platform level.

== Architecture and art ==
St. Clair West, designed by the TTC's in-house architects, is a colourful station featuring a wide variety of interior finishes such as ceramic tiles, brick and sculptural concrete surfaces. Backlit orange panels and an abstract tile pattern resembling a barcode at platform level distinguish the station from others in the system. The TTC built its first underground streetcar loop at this station circling an exceptionally spacious waiting area for connections to surface routes. Buskers often take advantage of the acoustics caused by the station's open architecture. Wilson is the one other station on the line which, due to its complexity, the TTC chose to design themselves.

The abstract enamel mural Tempo by Gordon Rayner is on the mezzanine-level bridge crossing the tracks.

The station has a second artwork, The Commuters by Rhonda Weppler and Trevor Mahovsky, installed during the 2016/17 station renovations. The artwork consists of many bronze snails of about 50-centimetres in size clinging to the walls of a staircase leading from the bridge over the subway tracks to the streetcar/bus platform. The work was inspired by Pierre Berton’s book for children: The Secret World of Og.

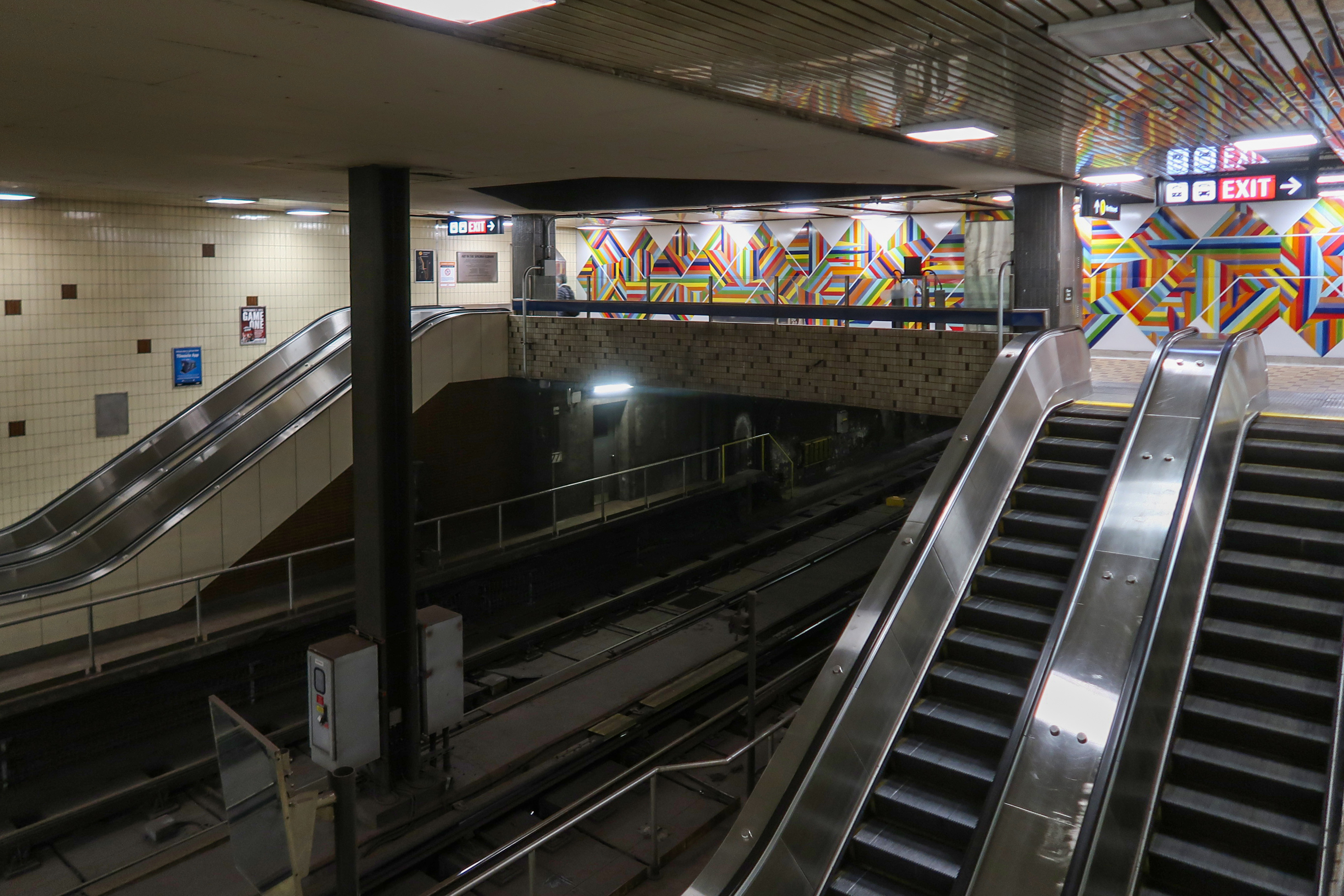
Tempo by Gordon Rayner

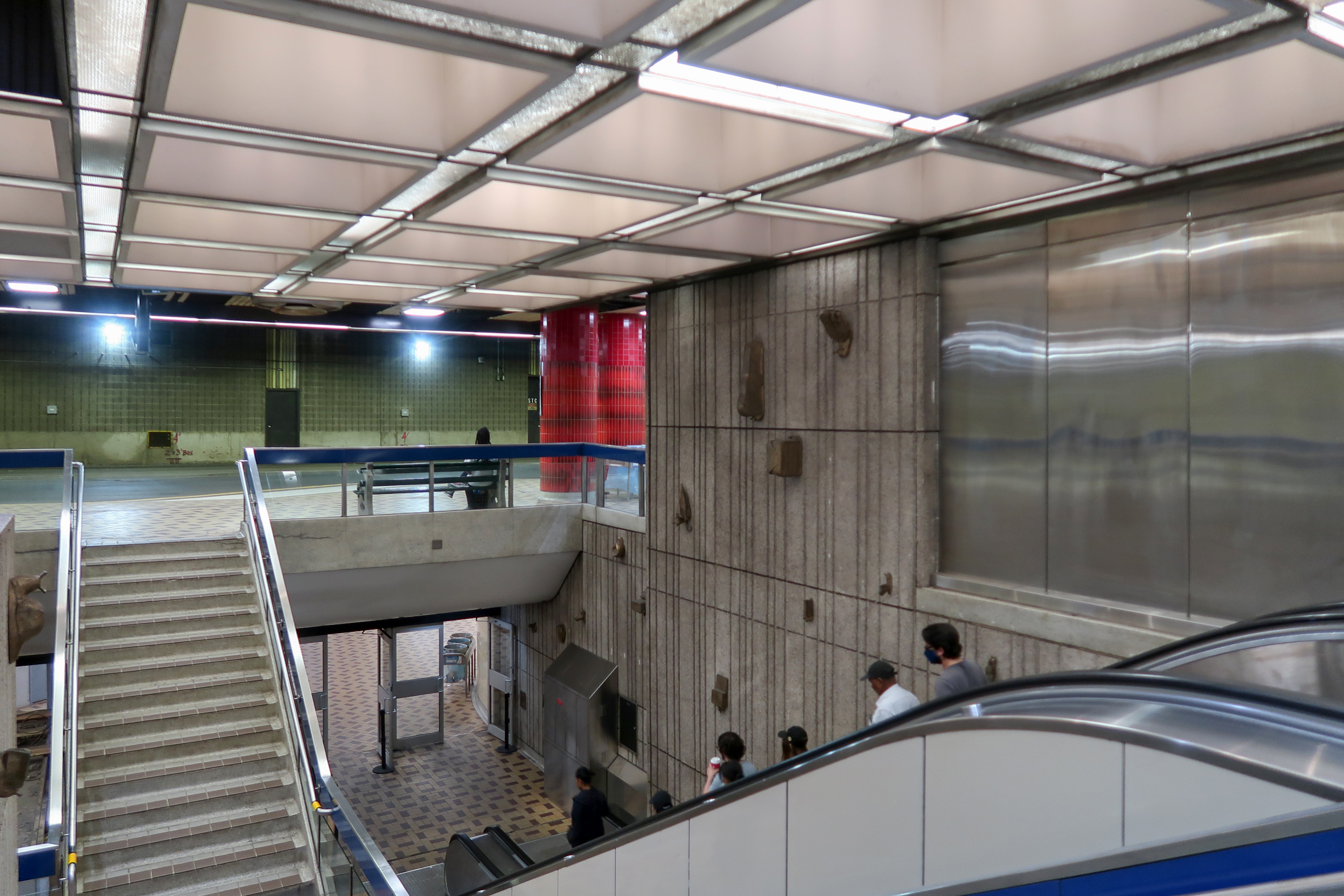
The Commuters snails climbing the walls

== Subway infrastructure in the vicinity ==
South of the station, the subway tunnel cuts southeast through the Nordheimer Ravine, where the emergency exit used in the Russell Hill accident is located, then continues in a bored tunnel south beneath Spadina Road and under Casa Loma to Dupont Station.

Also constructed by the cut-and-cover method north of the station, the tunnel runs northwest through the Cedarvale Ravine to Cedarvale station.

== Connections ==
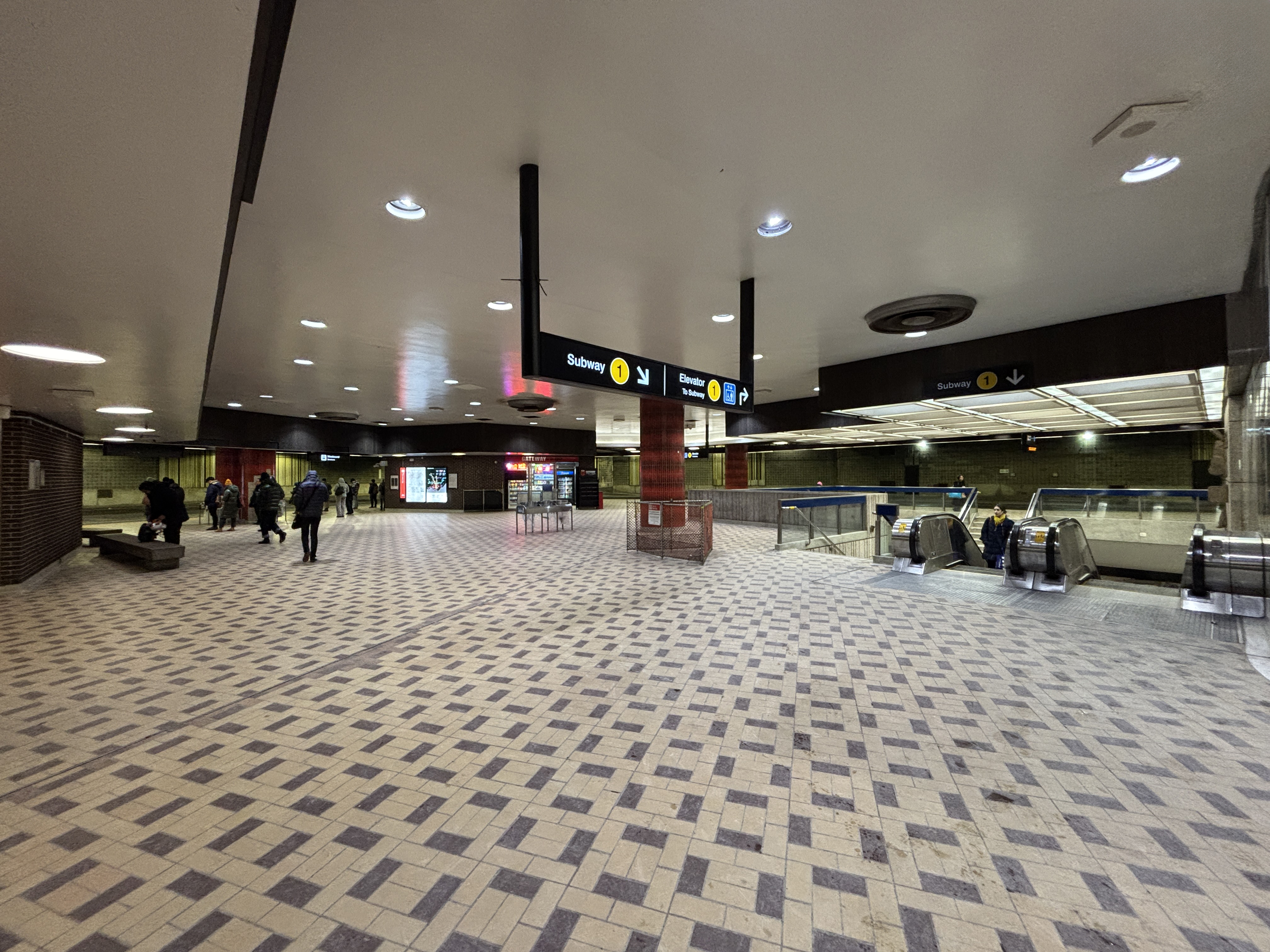
Streetcar drop-off area

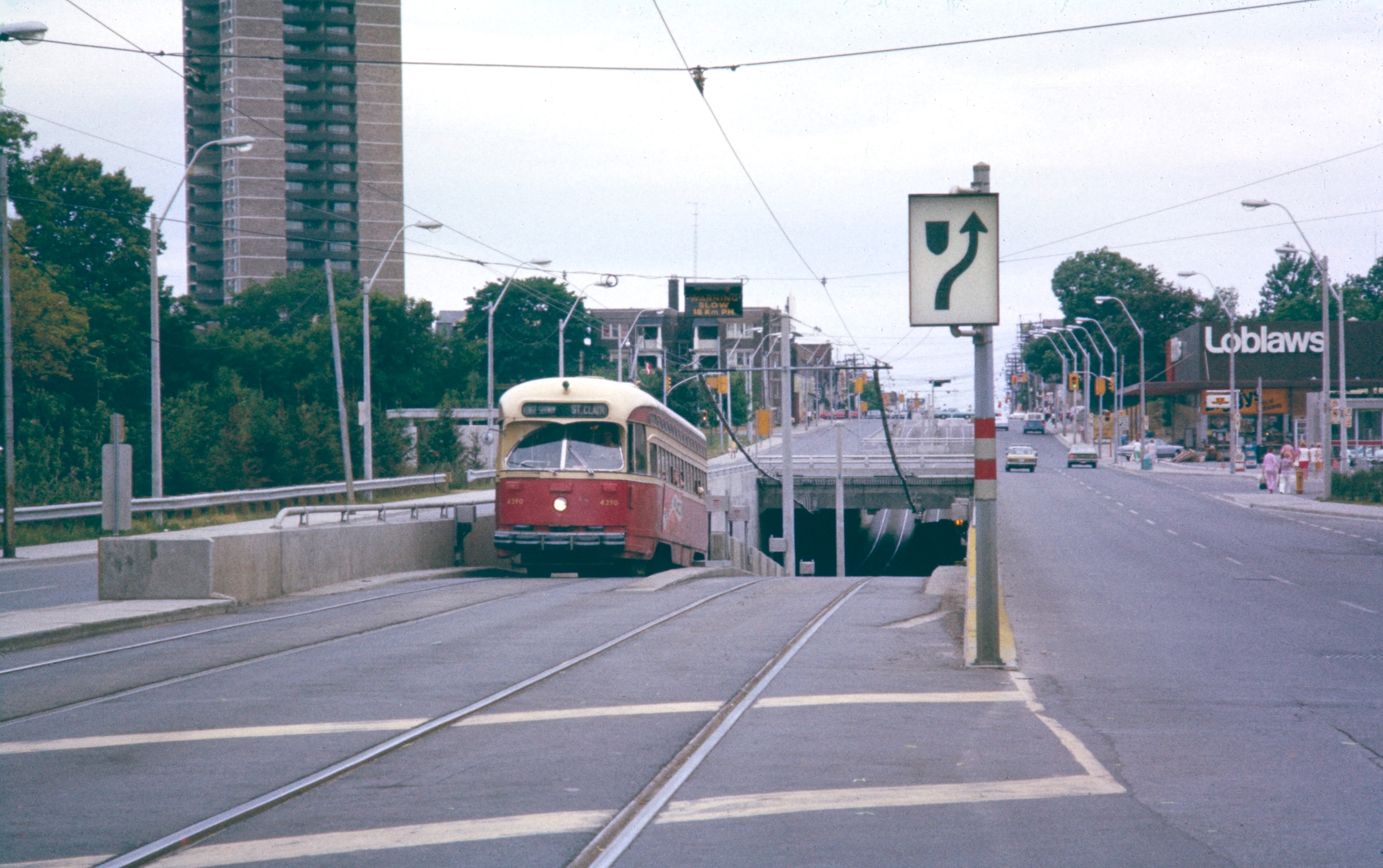
A PCC streetcar coming back up to the surface of St. Clair Avenue from the underground streetcar stop only a few months after the station's opening, 1978

These routes can be boarded in the underground loop:

Route	Name	Additional information
33	Forest Hill	Northbound to Eglinton Avenue West (Roselawn Avenue)
90	Vaughan	Northbound to Cedarvale station
126	Christie	Southbound to Christie station
312	St. Clair	Blue Night service streetcar; same route as 512 St. Clair; Overnight service stops on St. Clair Avenue West and does not enter the station.
512	St. Clair	Streetcar; eastbound to St. Clair station and westbound to Gunns Loop (west of Keele Street)

To connect to these bus routes, passengers can walk outside the station to Bathurst Street:

Route	Name	Additional information
7	Bathurst	Northbound to Steeles Avenue West and southbound to Bathurst station
307	Bathurst	Blue Night service; northbound to Steeles Avenue West and southbound to Exhibition Loop
