= Blue Night Network =

Overnight public transit service in Toronto, Ontario, Canada

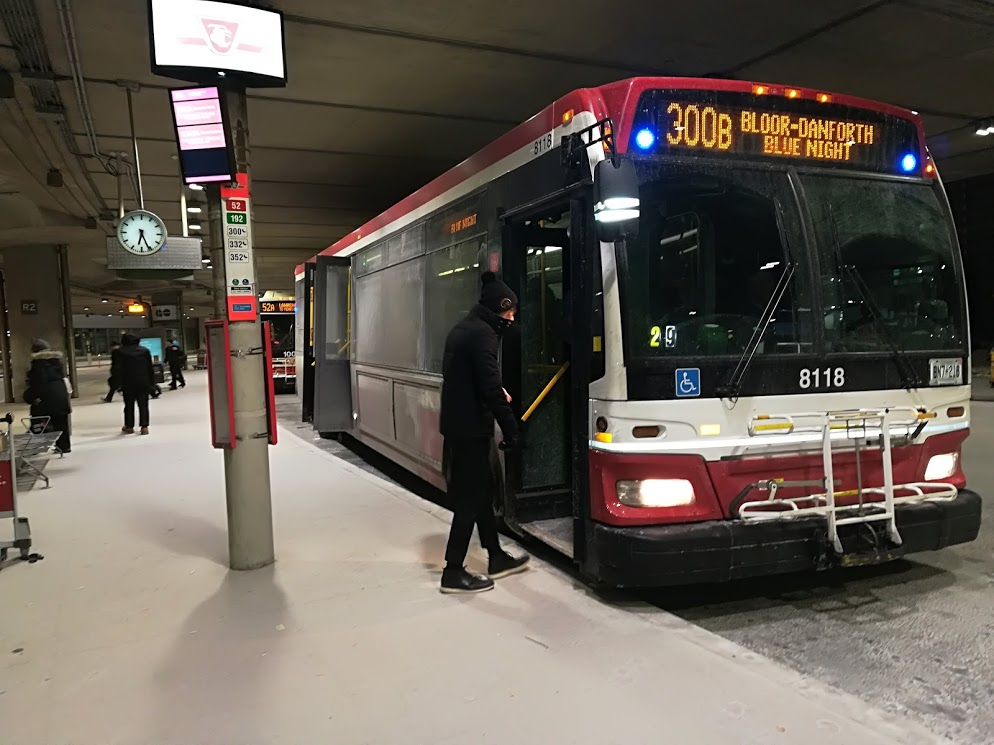
A passenger boards a 300 Bloor–Danforth Blue Night bus at Pearson Airport.

The Blue Night Network is the overnight public transit service operated by the Toronto Transit Commission (TTC) in Toronto, Ontario, Canada. The network consists of a basic grid of 27 bus and 7 streetcar routes, distributed so that almost all of the city is within 2 kilometres (1.2 mi) of at least one route. It is the largest and most frequent overnight network in North America. (Note: Cities such as New York and Chicago offer significant subway and bus service overnight but are not organized as a separate "network".)

== Overview ==
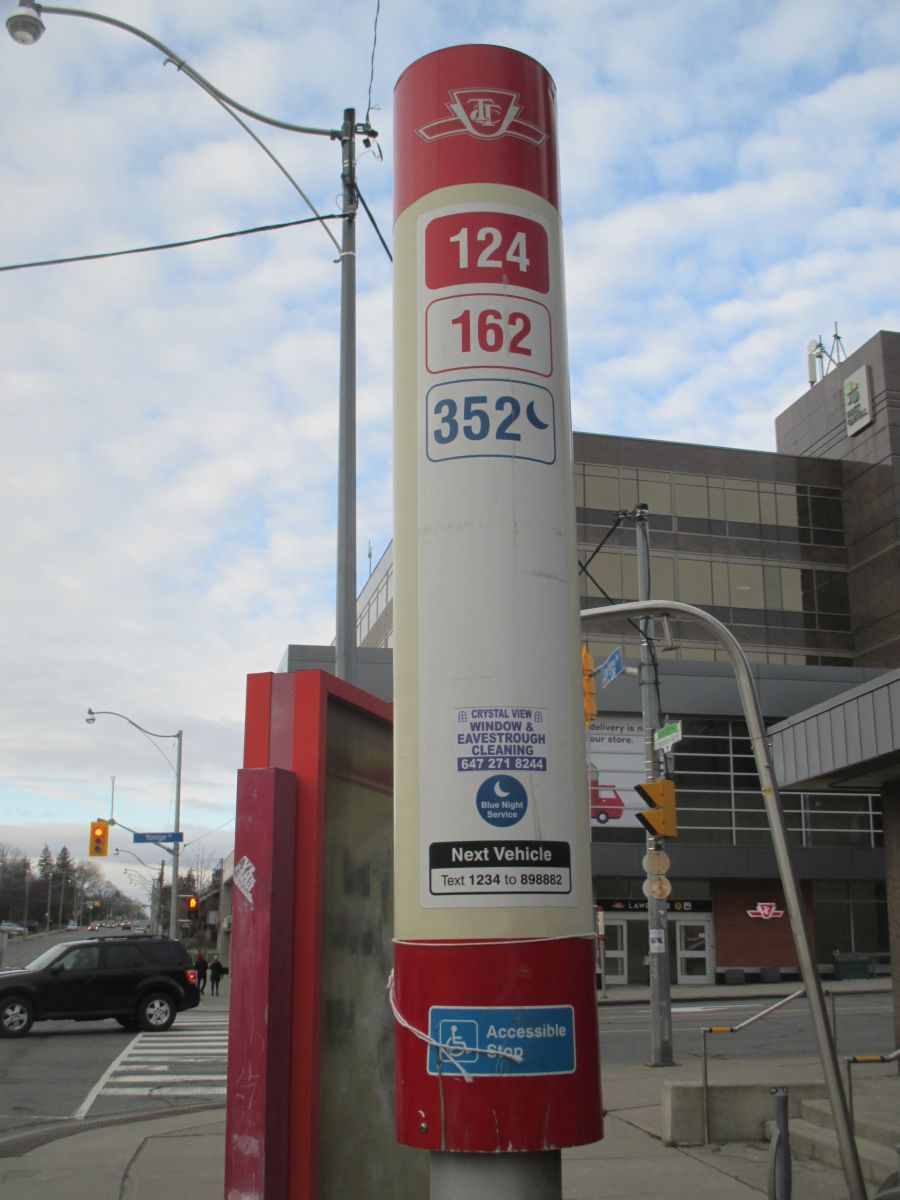
Bus stop served by 352 Lawrence West Night Bus

=== Hours ===
The times of Blue Night service vary according to individual scheduling situations on each route. Most regular service bus and streetcar routes cease operations at approximately 1:30 a.m. If there is a Blue Night route on the same street, its first trip will then follow at a suitable interval after the last regular run.

On the subway system, the last trains on each line make a complete trip; the last trains running east, west, and north from Bloor–Yonge and St. George stations each leave at 1:50 a.m. or just after. Each station then closes as the last train departs.

In the morning, regular bus and streetcar service mostly takes over from the corresponding Blue Night routes around 5:30 a.m, or 8:00 a.m. on Sundays. The first trains on the subway then start from various positions along the routes, allowing all stations to open more or less simultaneously just before 6:00 a.m., or 8:00 a.m. on Sundays. The Blue Night routes that parallel the subway lines keep running until that time, and their last buses terminate service at a subway station to facilitate transfers to the trains.

=== Fares ===
Normal TTC fares apply on the Blue Night Network. Passengers can transfer to or from regular-service routes as usual. Additionally, the TTC's Presto day ticket is valid until 2:59 a.m. on the day following the ticket's first use, rather than expiring at midnight.

=== Routes ===
Blue Night routes operate with frequencies of every 30 minutes or better. Blue Night routes are distinguished from regular routes by numbers in the 300 series. Numbering on these routes can correspond to a day route, such as 301 Queen being Blue Night for 501 Queen. Routings are often combinations of multiple-day routes or slight alterations to their corresponding day route.

Most routes are operated by TTC's fleet of low-floor buses, where applicable, making them fully accessible for handicapped and wheelchair users. Seven routes operate with streetcars: the 301 Queen, the 303 Kingston Rd, the 304 King, the 305 Dundas, the 306 Carlton, the 310 Spadina, and the 312 St. Clair. As of January 2020, all of these routes are operated with accessible Flexity Outlook streetcars.

== History ==
=== Before the Blue Night Network ===
Toronto has had overnight streetcar service since the days of the Toronto Railway Company in the 1890s, and the TTC continued it when they took over in 1921. The routes selected for 24-hour service were those serving 24-hour employers such as factories, stockyards, and railway yards.

Over the years various streetcar routes were replaced by other modes, and where new subway lines replaced streetcars during regular hours, buses were put on overnight. But the overnight routings remained largely unchanged for decades, even after the TTC's service area expanded in 1954 from the Toronto city limits as they then were, to include the whole of Metropolitan Toronto ("Metro", which in 1998 became the amalgamated city of Toronto). Only one overnight route (the Queen streetcar, later 501 Queen, to Long Branch loop) extended a significant distance into the suburbs.

In 1974, after the subway had been extended beyond the Toronto city limits in three directions, the same was done for overnight bus service. But large areas of Metro still remained without 24-hour transit – Etobicoke, North York, and Scarborough each had only one or two routes – as late as 1986, when the TTC's planning department issued a report on Metro All-Night Transit Service calling for major changes.

=== 1986 report ===
The report pointed out that the importance of the original "demand generators" for overnight public transit had declined. Nightly demand was now twice as heavy on weekends as on weekdays, showing that not many people were using transit to get to night work. And as Metro had grown, only 45% of its population still lived within a 15-minute walk of the existing 24-hour transit routes. In fact, hardly any of the 14 overnight routes then in existence were strictly justified by demand any more, particularly on weekdays. But since "one of the TTC's primary goals is to maximize mobility and accessibility to transit service", the report's recommendation was to redesign the system, not eliminate it.

Most of Toronto has a squarish grid of main streets that originated as early 19th-century concession roads, and are spaced at 1 1/4-mile intervals (about 2 km). By running overnight buses along every second road in the grid, all parts of Metro would be reached and 86% of the population would be within a 15-minute walk (taken as 1.25 km or 3/4 mile). To avoid excessively long trips, some grid streets such as Eglinton Avenue would require two bus routes meeting end-to-end, but still just 15 routes would be needed to form the grid. The 506 Carlton route had sufficient ridership to be retained in addition, for a total of 16 routes.

This is what the report proposed. In changing from the old network of 14 routes to the new set of 16, only 2 routes would be entirely unchanged. There would be 11 entirely new overnight routes (all bus-operated), with 7 existing ones eliminated (3 streetcar, 3 trolley bus, and only 1 bus route, as the night network would be shifted away from the streetcar tracks and trolley bus wires).

Despite the route eliminations and probable increased ridership, the changes could not be expected to finance themselves. The report recommended reducing service frequencies after 10 p.m. on certain routes in order to offset the increased costs.

=== Establishment ===
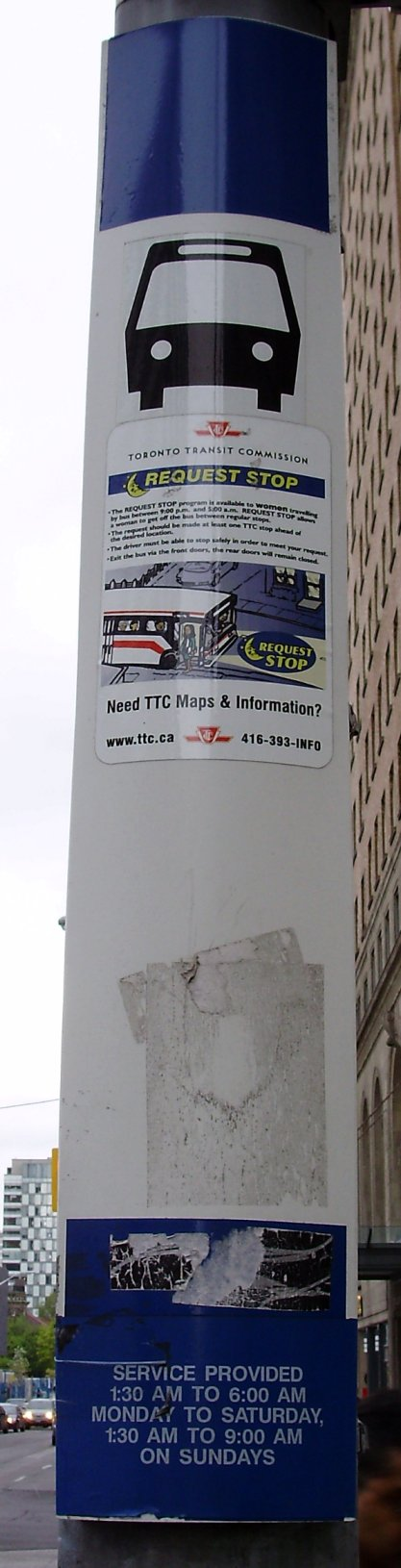
Former signage for the Blue Night stop at Avenue Road served by the 300 Bloor–Danforth route

The TTC agreed to the expanded service, but could not stomach the elimination of so many routes. Instead, they chose to retain all existing routes despite the cost, creating a 23-route night system.

Until this time, with the exception of buses that replaced subway lines, it had been understood that overnight transit was provided by regular routes that happened to have 24-hour service. Night services retained the same route names and numbers as their daytime counterparts, perhaps with a suffixed letter if there was a variation in the exact routing. But now a marketing decision was made to treat the overnight service as a new, distinct set of routes, even in those cases where the day route was identical.

The name Blue Night Network was adopted, and with it the 300-series route numbers described above, and a new colour-coding for bus and streetcar stops. The existing standard TTC-stop sign had a red square or stripe at the top and bottom; later, for all stops with 24-hour service, this was changed to red and blue, with the legend "24 hr" added. Those stops used only for the Blue Night Network, mostly for night routes paralleling the subway, received the standard sign with red changed to blue (and a notice of the limited hours). Since 2013, bus stop signs list the route numbers serving each stop, colour-coding each type of route. Blue Night route numbers are shown in blue next to a moon symbol. The Blue Night Network debuted in February 1987.

=== Later changes ===
In the 1990s, the TTC suffered major funding cuts and service on many low-traffic routes was reduced; the Blue Night Network lost three routes in February 1992, selected from those proposed for elimination in 1986. But other routes have been extended or added over the years, including one case (312 St. Clair in 2000) that required a mode conversion from streetcar to bus. In February 2003, two Blue Night routes were extended to reach Toronto Pearson International Airport.

Then in 2005, several routes were added so that east–west service would run on every grid street instead of alternate ones in much of the city. This has brought the Blue Night Network up to a total of 24 routes, serving 97% of the city's population within a 15-minute walk.

In the fall of 2015, the TTC expanded the Blue Night Network program, with 16 new or revised routes incorporated into the network as part of a $95 million investment made by Toronto City Council. This included the restoration of streetcar service on King Street as the 304 King and on Spadina Avenue as the 310 Spadina. Since January 2020, all night streetcar routes have been operated using accessible Flexity streetcars. In June 2024, overnight bus service between Gunns Loop and St. Clair station was replaced by the 312 St. Clair streetcar. In July 2024, the 305 Dundas streetcar was introduced, following the same route as the daytime 505 Dundas.
