= 1995 Russell Hill subway accident =

Deadly Toronto Subway train collision

Coordinates: 43.682351°N 79.411870°W

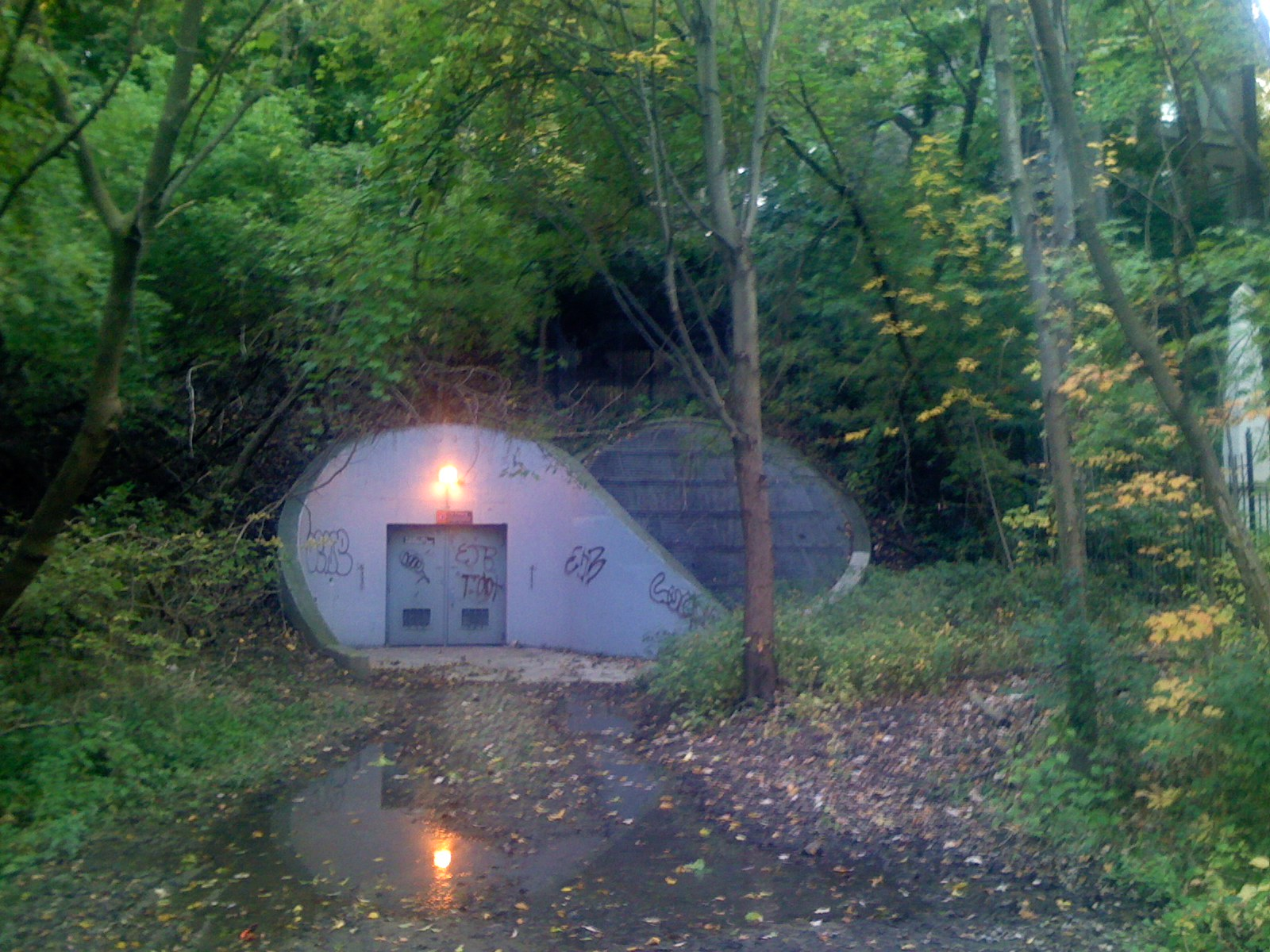
- The Russell Hill emergency exit located in Winston Churchill Park near Castle Frank Brook

Details
- Date: August 11, 1995; 6:02 p.m.
- Location: Toronto, Ontario
- Country: Canada
- Line: Line 1 Yonge–University
- Operator: Toronto Transit Commission
- Incident type: Collision
- Cause: Operator error; Equipment malfunction

Statistics
- Trains: H5, H1
- Deaths: 3
- Injured: 30 hospitalized, 100+ claims filed

The 1995 Russell Hill subway accident was a train crash that occurred in Toronto, Ontario, Canada, on Line 1 Yonge–University of the Toronto subway on August 11, 1995. Three people were killed and 30 were taken to hospital with injuries when one train rear-ended another train. The subway line was shut down for five days following the incident. Investigations found that human error and a design flaw in the mechanical safety devices caused this accident. It remains the deadliest rapid transit system accident in Canadian history.

== Overview ==
At 6:02 p.m. on August 11, 1995, a subway train running southbound on Line 1 Yonge–University ran into the rear of a stationary train halfway between St. Clair West and Dupont stations. There were between 200 and 300 passengers on the two trains, of whom three (Christina Munar Reyes, 33; Kinga Szabo, 43; and Xian Hui Lin, 23) were killed and 30 taken to hospital with injuries; about 100 more later filed injury claims against the Toronto Transit Commission (TTC). Many of the seriously injured were extracted from the twisted remains of the most damaged subway cars by rescue workers who worked through the evening under extremely hot and humid conditions. Of the four crew members, three were taken to hospital with injuries.

== Direct causes ==
The accident had two direct causes: first the inexperienced driver, Robert Jeffrey, who mistook the signals; and the train stop which failed to protect the train due to a design error.

=== Signals ===
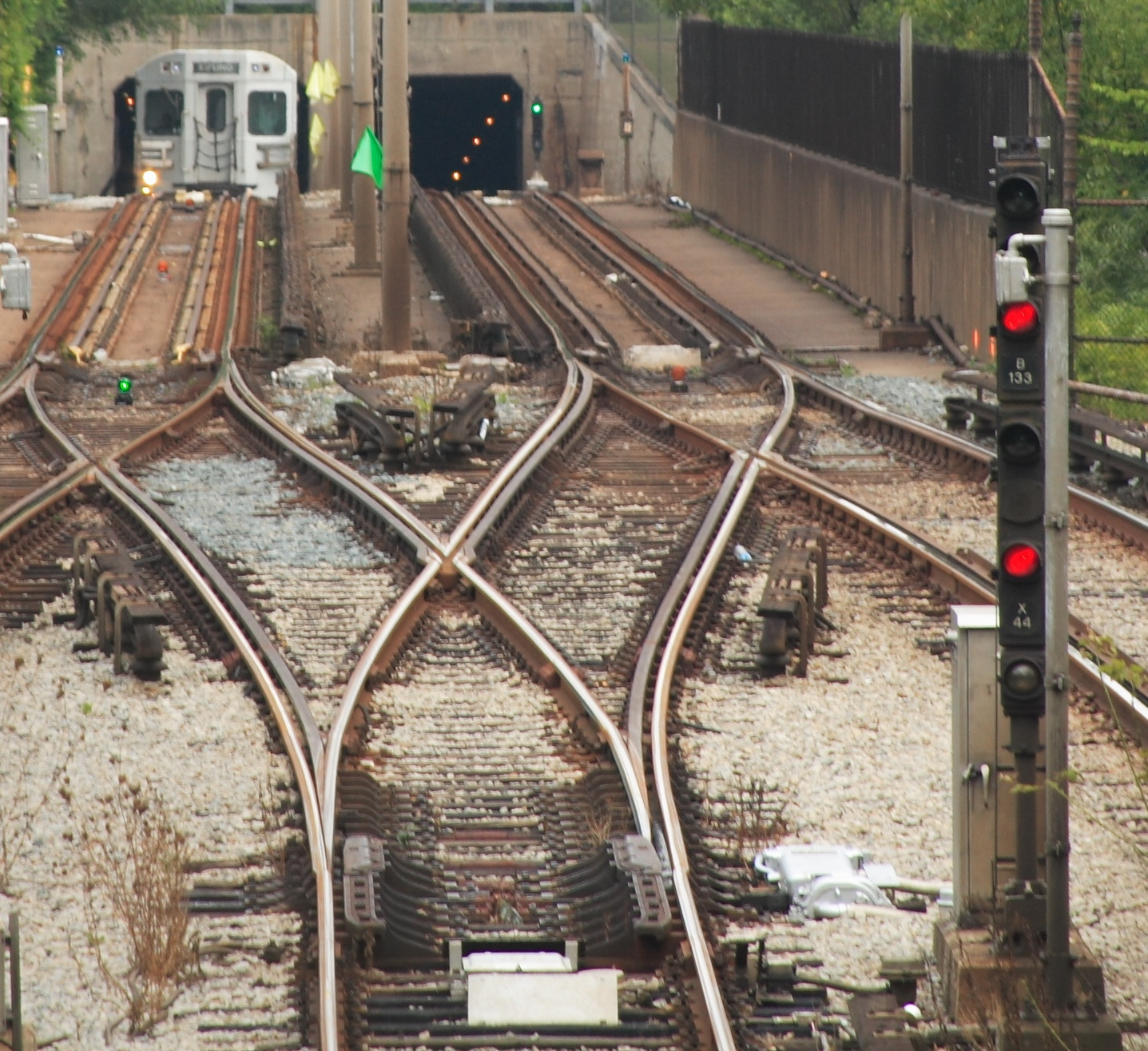
Signal lightbox at a switch of the Toronto subway

At the time of the accident, the TTC subway used conventional wayside signals without cab signalling, thus drivers were expected to remember each signal aspect and act accordingly until they received new information from the following signal. As of 2024, the TTC has converted all of Line 1 to automatic train control. The following description is limited to aspects relevant to the accident.

Some signals are "automatic" and have a single head that shows one of the three basic colours. Red means stop and stay (until presented with a less restrictive signal aspect), yellow means that the next signal is red and the driver should prepare to stop, and green means that the next signal is not red and it is safe to proceed at normal speed.

"Interlocking" or "home" signals have a double head and show two coloured lights. The top light has the same meaning as that of an automatic signal. The second light is red if the top light is red; otherwise it shows yellow if the switches are set for a secondary route, and green for the main route or if no relevant switches exist. Thus the combination yellow over green means the same as a single yellow.

At locations such as downgrades, curves, and switches, the same signals additionally serve to enforce speed limits. A system called "grade timing" regulates speeds, and is indicated by an additional "lunar white" light below the one or two coloured lights previously mentioned. The white light means that the next signal is red (or double red) only because of grade timing, and if the train approaches at the proper speed, the signal will clear to a less restrictive aspect before the train gets there. If the train goes too fast, it will pass the red signal and be stopped by the train stop.

In 1995 the second signal did not provide any confirmation that it was about to change and the operator was expected to remember the previous signal aspect correctly. With the tolerant attitudes of management, it had become common practice for operators to travel at the fastest speed that the system allowed, passing the signals at the same instant they were clearing.

A long downgrade would therefore have several consecutive grade-timing sections. If all the signals were automatic and no trains were present, the first signal would be yellow over white, followed by a series of red over whites, and finally a red. When the train approaches each red over white signal, it would clear to yellow over white and the train stop would be lowered; and the final red signal would clear to green. Interlocking signals can also take part in grade timing, with aspects such as yellow over green over white (meaning the same as yellow over white).

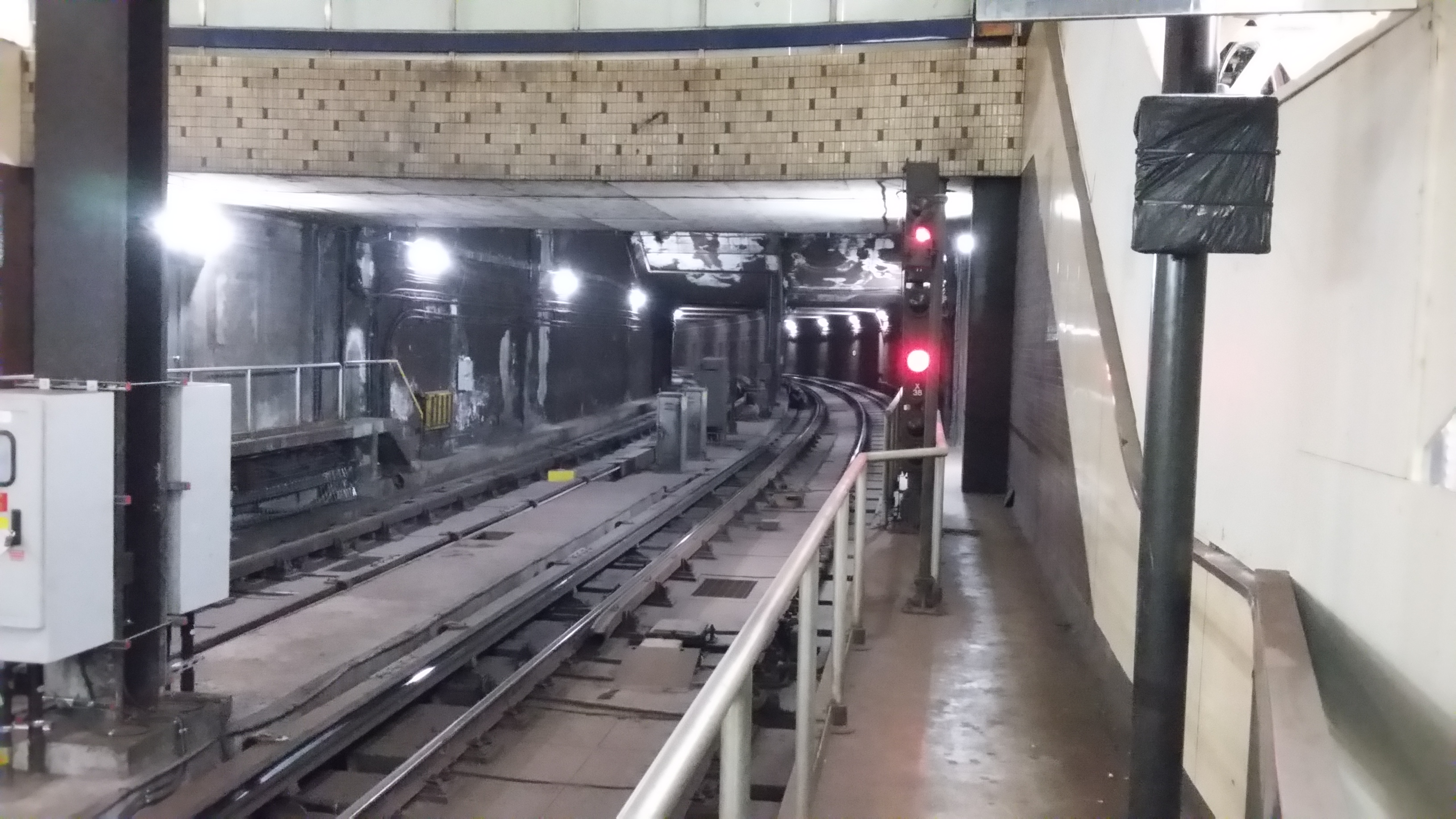
Looking south from St. Clair West station. Signal SP77/X38 can be seen showing red over red.

From St. Clair West to Dupont the subway runs continuously downhill and grade timing is used. The signal at the end of St. Clair West station, SP77/X38, is an interlocking signal and therefore shows yellow over green over white whenever there is nothing to delay a train. As Jeffrey's train passed the signal, however, it was showing yellow over green. He should have stopped at the following signal, SP71, which was red because another train was occupying the block ahead.

After the accident, Jeffrey said he remembered SP77/X38 as yellow over white (an impossible signal state). Jeffrey must have either misremembered it at the time or else a reflection off the signal head must have made the signal appear as the usual yellow over green over white. In any case, he believed that grade timing was in use and so approached signal SP71 at the same speed as he would normally drive on this section.

After this Jeffrey did not remember what he had seen, but it is easy to reconstruct the events. When the train passed SP71 without him seeing it change, he must have assumed that he had passed it just as it cleared. He continued coasting downhill, still thinking that he was under grade timing and violated the signal, without realizing that if this was true, the signal would have shown red over white as he approached.

He must therefore have expected the third signal, the SP65, to clear in the same way. Again it was showing red, not red over white, but Jeffrey repeated his mistake and violated the signal. He braked only when he actually saw the train just ahead (it was stopped at the next signal, SP53); by then, a collision was unavoidable.

News media accounts of the accident often say that Jeffrey "passed three red lights." This count includes the repeater signal provided in advance of SP65 because a curve in the tunnel interferes with sighting. Drivers are not expected to stop at the repeater even if it is red.

=== Train stop ===
The "trip" or "train stop" consists of a T-shaped arm placed just outside the right-hand rail near each signal (except a repeater). If the signal is red (or double red), with or without a lunar white, the trip arm rises enough for its crossbar to strike a "trip valve" or "tripcock" lever on the bottom of a train's first car as it passes; and by doing so triggers the emergency brakes of the train.

On the relevant class of trains, the trip valve is located near the centre of the right side of the leading bogie, where its position in relation to the rail is well controlled.

Wismer and Becker, Inc., the contractors who installed the signal system on the Spadina line portion of the subway, chose to use an Ericsson train stop that was designed to have the trip arm located in the middle of the track. A subcontractor, Gayle Manufacturing, designed a mechanical extension that would allow the device to drive a trip arm in its actual position outside of the rail.

What was not realized was that the mechanism they designed (when the trip arm was raised) did not have the clearance specified for the train and therefore would not have the desired effect of activating the train's emergency braking system.

When both the trip arm and trip valve were new, this did not matter; the train did not fill its entire clearance envelope, and the trip arm would contact the trip valve normally. However, with normal wear of the wheels and rails, and with the train rounding a curve at speed (and therefore riding off-centre) it was another matter. The first wheel on the right-hand side of the train hit a bolt in the mechanism attached to the trip arm and knocked the arm down. It would then rise again, but too late: with the train moving quickly, the trip valve, just a few feet behind the wheel, would already have gone past, thus making the train stop useless for ensuring signal compliance.

== Inquest ==
The jury at the coroner's inquest produced 18 recommendations:

1. Reform of the Railways Act (1950) to provide oversight of the Toronto Transit Commission.
2. The TTC should submit to an independent safety audit every two years, beyond that done by APTA. This independent agency will be set up under the revised Railway Act.
3. Completion of the "Due Diligence Checklist" of deficiencies identified by the TTC.
4. The Province and Metro commit to a "State of Good Repair" funding policy; repair to take precedence over new works (see Line 4 Sheppard); future capital funding based on the State of Good Repair. The jury indicated that underfunding since the mid-1980s has contributed to the deterioration of the system and had jeopardized the safety of the Toronto Transit Commission.
5. Improvements to the Operations Training Centre starting with the hiring of an accredited adult training specialist. The updated training package should include at least: realistic pass / fail grading, annual refresher for all operators, emphasis on the meaning of the signal system, route supervisory accompaniment for at least one day of complete runs after training completion.
6. An updated Operations Training Centre to include a suitable subway simulator.
7. A comprehensive review of the signal system with emphasis in the following areas: Lunar Whites, removal of signal identification markers, consistent placement of signal aspects, progressive speed control, expansion of IPHC to identify headway and train separation, all trip valves activated and relocation of reset.
8. Elimination of auto key-by facility and implementation of raised trip arm immediately after train has passed.
9. Advanced implementation of the new subway communications system.
10. Improved communication within the organization.
11. A new Transit Control Centre including the updating of the skills of TTC staff.
12. The current Transit Control Centre should only be responsible for Operations. Such things as intrusion alarms, facility maintenance, public information, media relations and other related concerns should be handled by an adjacent facility.
13. Emergency response exercise every five years with "everybody". Yearly reviews by the Safety department
14. Improved predictive and preventative maintenance with computer assist where applicable.
15. Review of equipment procurement with respect to quality control. The procurement of cheap equipment (the Ericsson train stops) is a misuse of resources and a serious safety issue.
16. Traceable design criteria and standards for track, signal and subway cars. No modifications without approval of design review authority.
17. Train operators and the TTC must identify signal malfunctions by signal identification numbers. Review of the discipline system to allow for signal malfunctions. Operators reporting for duty to meet an inspector so that "State of the road" information can be passed on. Rookie operators not to be scheduled together.
18. The office of the Chief Coroner is to convene a press conference one year hence to provide all parties with an update on the implementation of these recommendations.

The 18 recommendations were taken by the TTC and turned into a 236-point "Due Diligence Checklist" of items to be addressed. Each year the Toronto Transit Commission receives a report on the outstanding items. By 2009, only 2 of the recommendations had yet to be completed. By 2015, all 236 recommendations had been implemented.

== Aftermath ==
The TTC acted quickly following the accident to repair the defective modified Ericsson train stops. They also began requiring drivers to traverse grade-timing sections at a speed that would allow them to actually see the red signal change before they left the section.

In 1997 and 1998, the behaviour of the signals themselves was changed. Now, when a signal is red (or double red) only because of grade timing, the (top) red light begins flashing once a train has passed the preceding signal that displayed the lunar white light. The trip arm remains up during this phase, but the flashing red confirms to the driver that there was a lunar white on entry to the section and that the signal can be expected to clear at any moment. Jeffrey's mistaken interpretation of the red signal SP71 would no longer be possible.

In 2003, Toronto's Tarragon Theatre premiered Russell Hill, a theatrical play by Chris Earle about the impact of the disaster on several characters.

== See also ==
- List of rail accidents in Canada
