= Dupont station =

Toronto subway station

Dupont
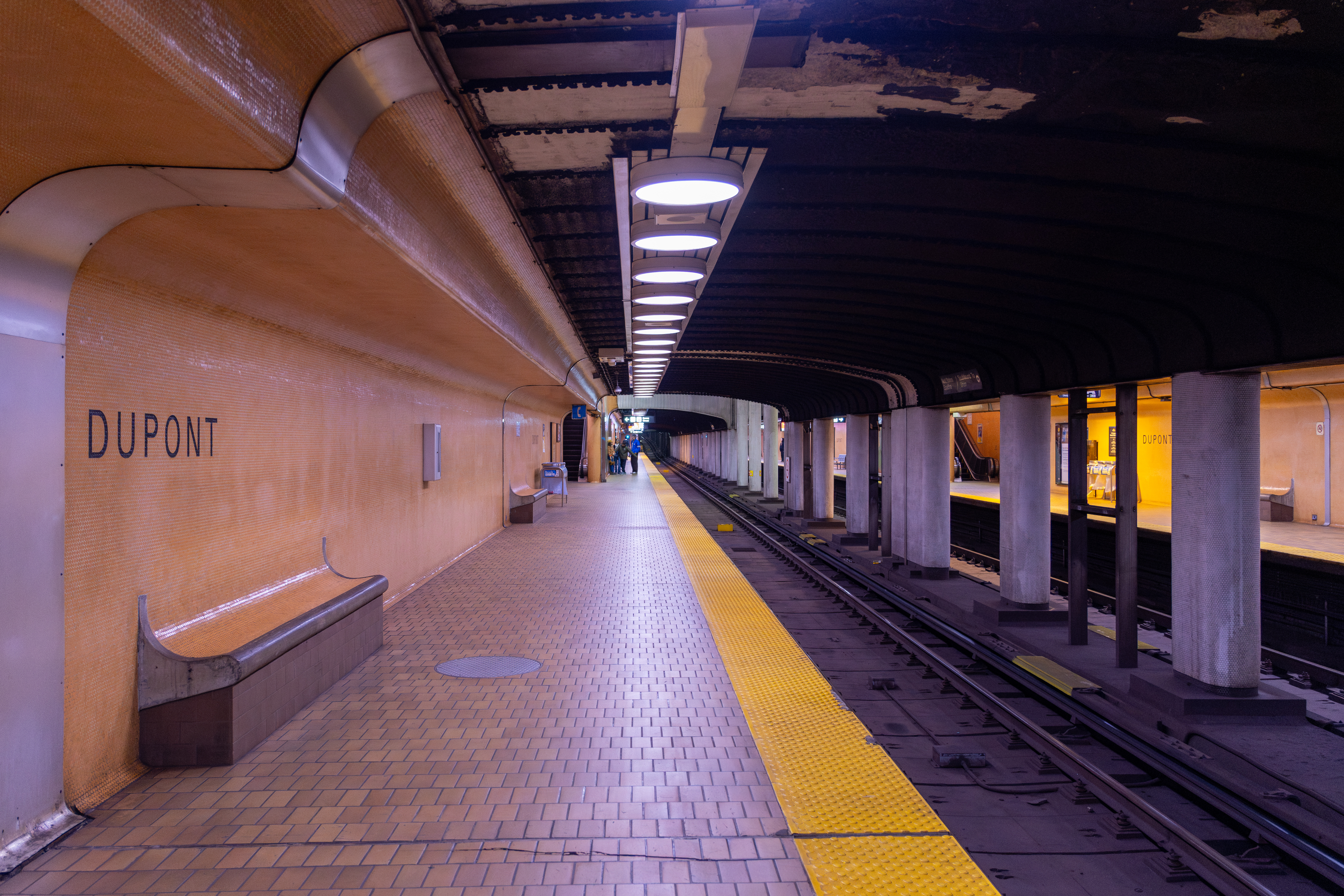

General information
- Location: 263 Dupont Street; Toronto, Ontario; Canada
- Coordinates: 43°40′29″N 79°24′25″W
- Platforms: Side platforms
- Tracks: 2
- Connections: TTC buses: 26 Dupont; 127 Davenport

Construction
- Structure type: Underground
- Accessible: Yes
- Architect: Dunlop-Farrow Architects

Other information
- Website: Official station page

History
- Opened: January 28, 1978; 48 years ago

Passengers
- 2023–2024: 11,084
- Rank: 54 of 70

Services
Preceding station	Toronto Transit Commission	Following station
St. Clair West towards Vaughan	Line 1 Yonge–University	Spadina towards Finch
Location

Dupont is a subway station on Line 1 Yonge–University in Toronto, Ontario, Canada. It is located on Spadina Road at Dupont Street in the Annex neighbourhood of the city.

== History ==
The station opened in 1978, as part of the "Spadina" extension of the subway line from St. George to Wilson station.

The 1995 Russell Hill subway accident happened on August 11, 1995, when a train southbound from St. Clair West station rear-ended another stationary train just north of Dupont station. Three people were killed and 30 were taken to hospital with injuries, and this section of the subway line was shut down for five days. Subsequent investigations found that a combination of human error and a design flaw in a mechanical safety device caused the accident.

On June 1, 2006, at 9:30 a.m., as a train entered the station, a metal cover in the bottom of the last subway car came loose and wedged in the third rail. This filled the train with smoke, forcing the evacuation of the station and disrupting service for about an hour. The possibility that this incident may have resulted from sabotage by striking TTC personnel was discarded by the Toronto Police.

Three elevators and improved fare gates were constructed, to make the station accessible. An open house was held on September 24, 2015, to outline the work involved. The elevators opened on September 30, 2020.

== Architecture and art ==
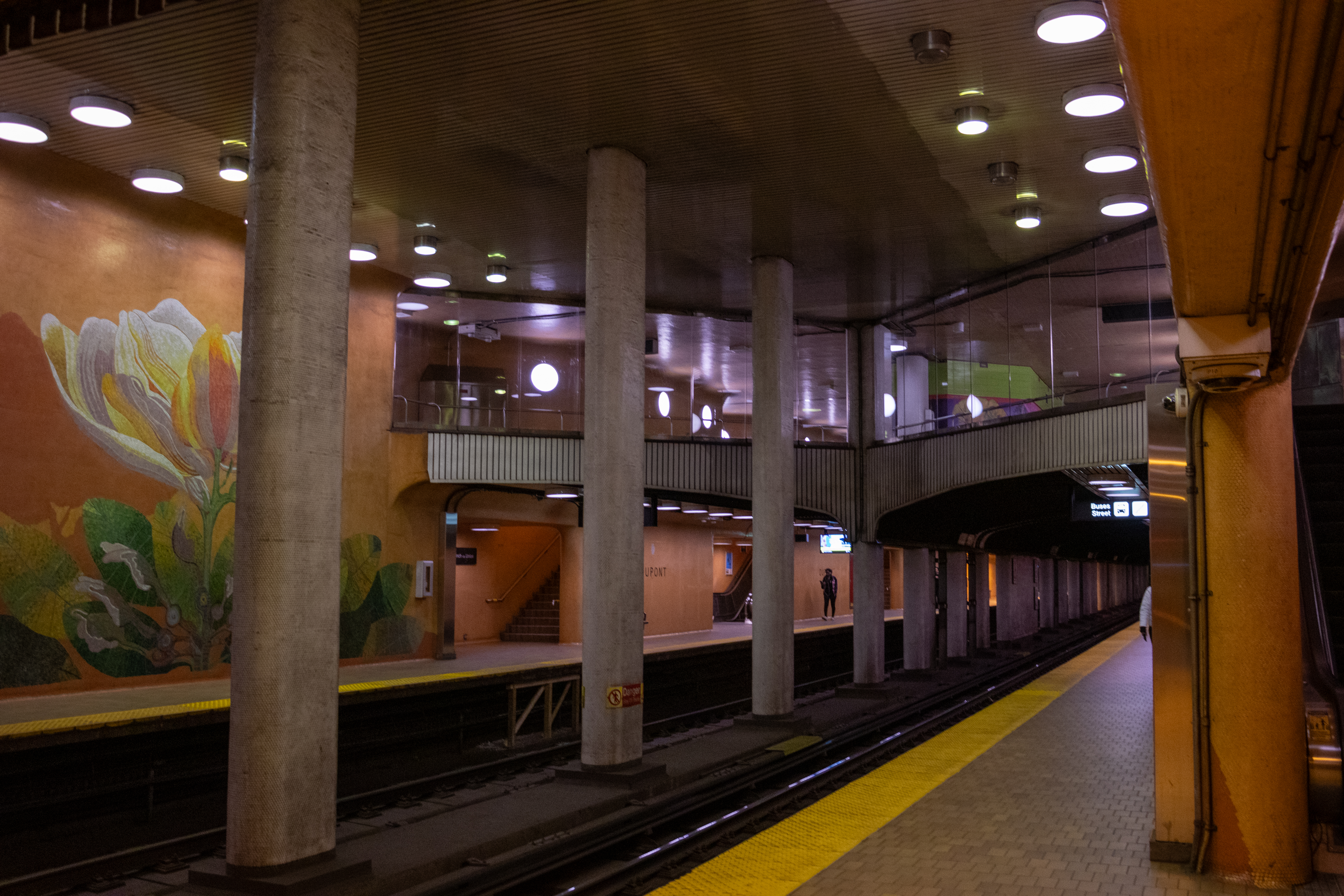
Open atrium at platform level

Dupont Station was designed by Dunlop-Farrow Architects. The two entrances to the station, located at the northwest and southeast corners of Dupont Street and Spadina Road, take the form of glass "bubbles" with orange-painted metal frames covering the stairways and escalators. A motif of rounded surfaces and finishes is used, with the interior walls of the station being clad in small circular orange tiles and all corners curved. On the platforms unique built-in concrete benches are also rounded and covered with the same tiles as the walls and the use of large circular lighting fixtures throughout the station reinforces the theme. The overall effect of the interior's rounded surfaces and colour scheme is of an earthly cavern.

The main artwork in the station consists of murals designed by James Sutherland, entitled Spadina Summer Under All Seasons. Using thousands of pieces of glass, colourful mosaics of flowers were created directly within the station's tiling. Two large mosaics of a giant flower in cross-section face each other across the tracks, reaching upward to a mezzanine level lined with smaller flower mosaics. Sculptor Ron Baird designed massive circular interlocking doors which provide access to the electrical substation, which is nestled behind the northwest entrance.

In mid-2021, to celebrate the TTC's 100th anniversary, a temporary art installation titled Yonge Subway Construction by John DeRinzy was put on display at the station. It was located at the subway platform levels and was removed in July 2022.

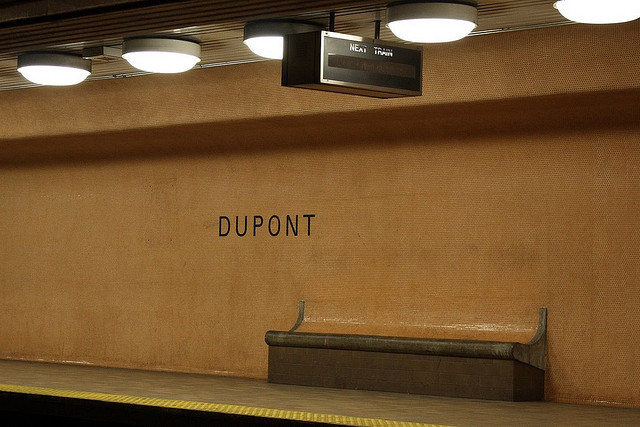
Platform lighting, tiled wall and built-in bench

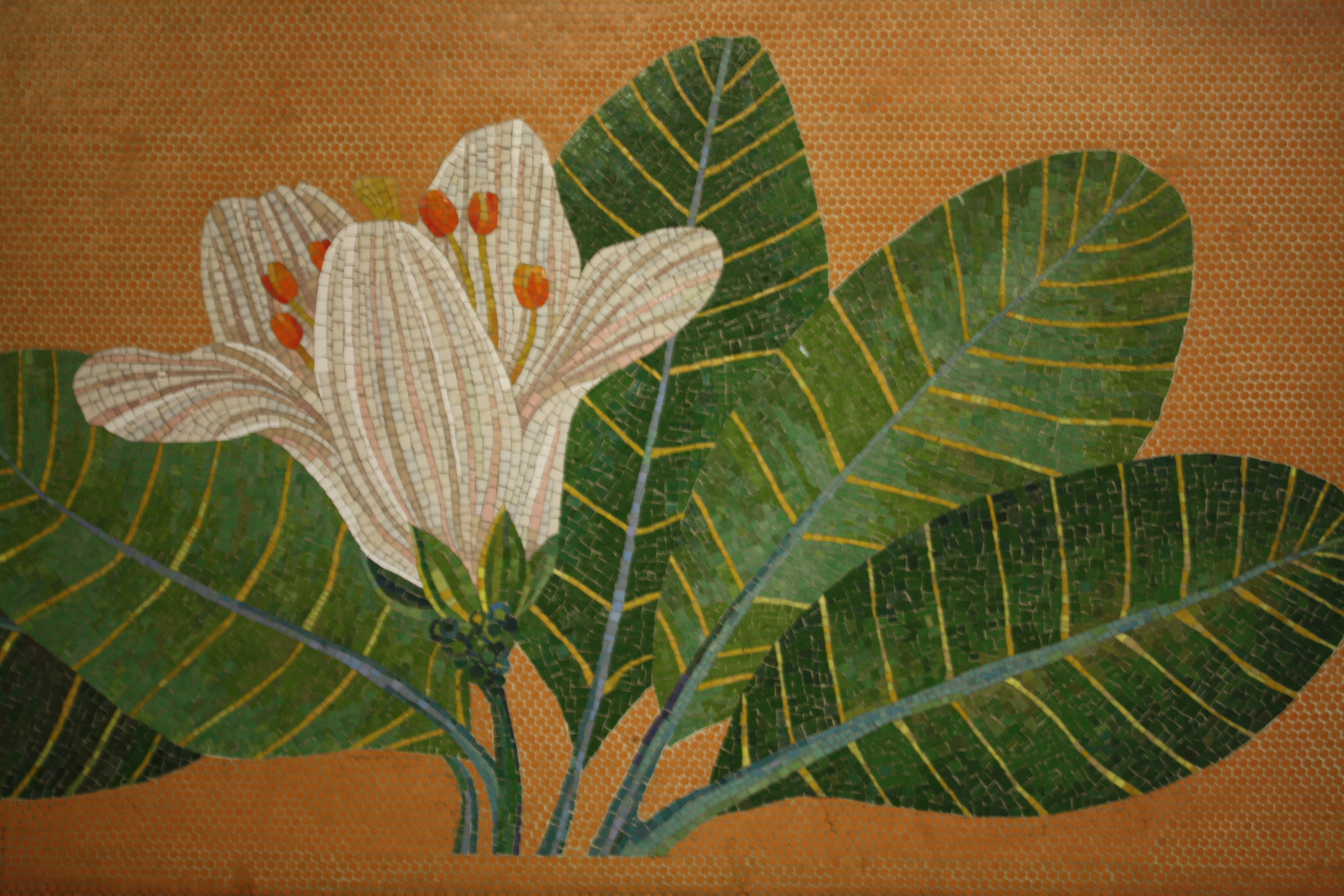
Flower mosaic by James Sutherland

== Nearby landmarks ==
The station is located on the north side of the Annex neighbourhood. Nearby landmarks include Casa Loma, the Spadina House, George Brown College's Casa Loma campus, and the City of Toronto Archives.

== Surface connections ==
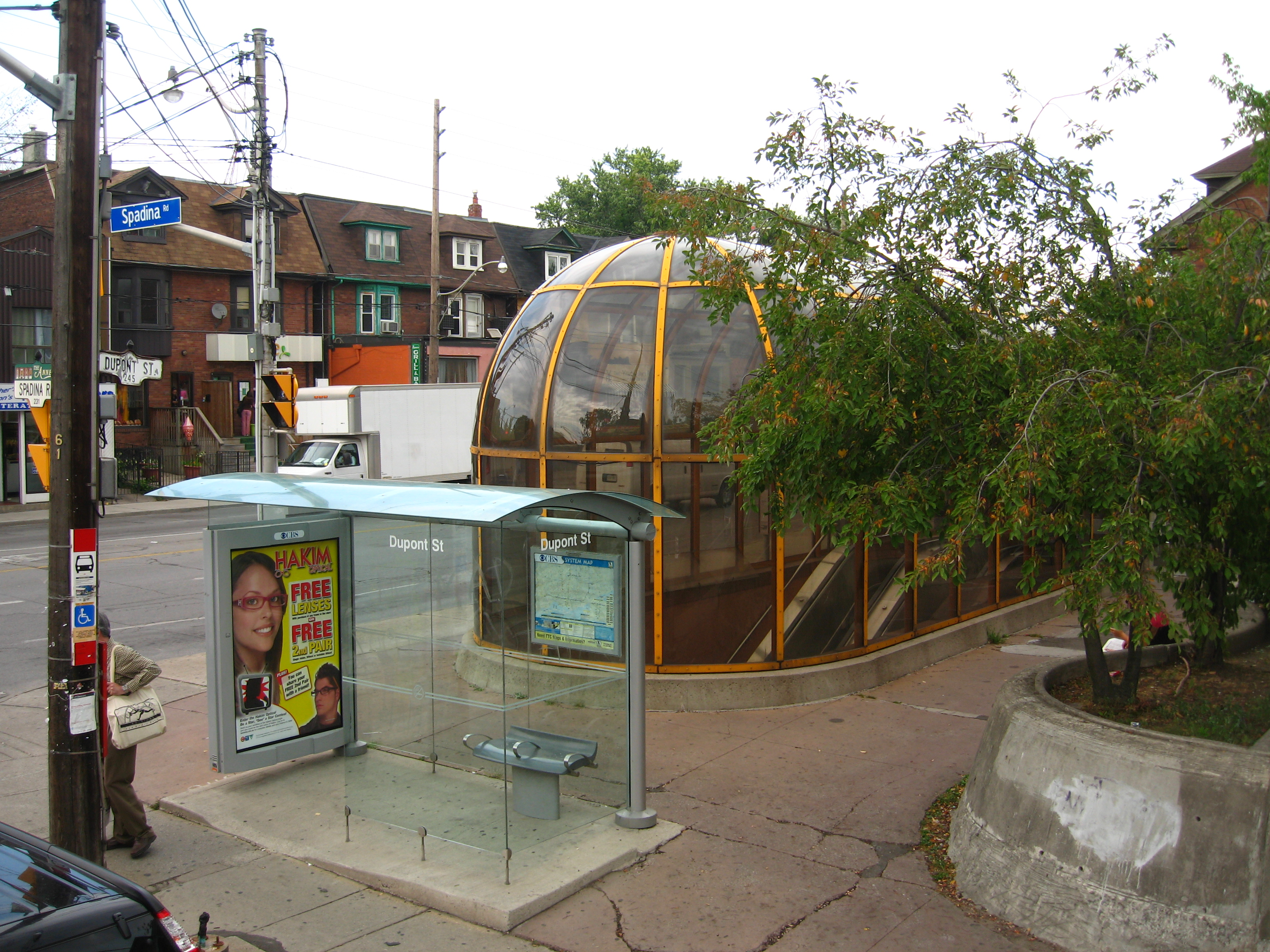
Bus stop beside southeast entrance

A transfer is required to connect between the subway system and these surface routes:

TTC routes serving the station include:

Route	Name	Additional information
26	Dupont	Eastbound to St. George station and westbound to Jane station
127	Davenport	Eastbound to Spadina station and westbound to St. Clair Avenue West and Old Weston Road
