= 512 St. Clair =

Streetcar route in Toronto, Canada

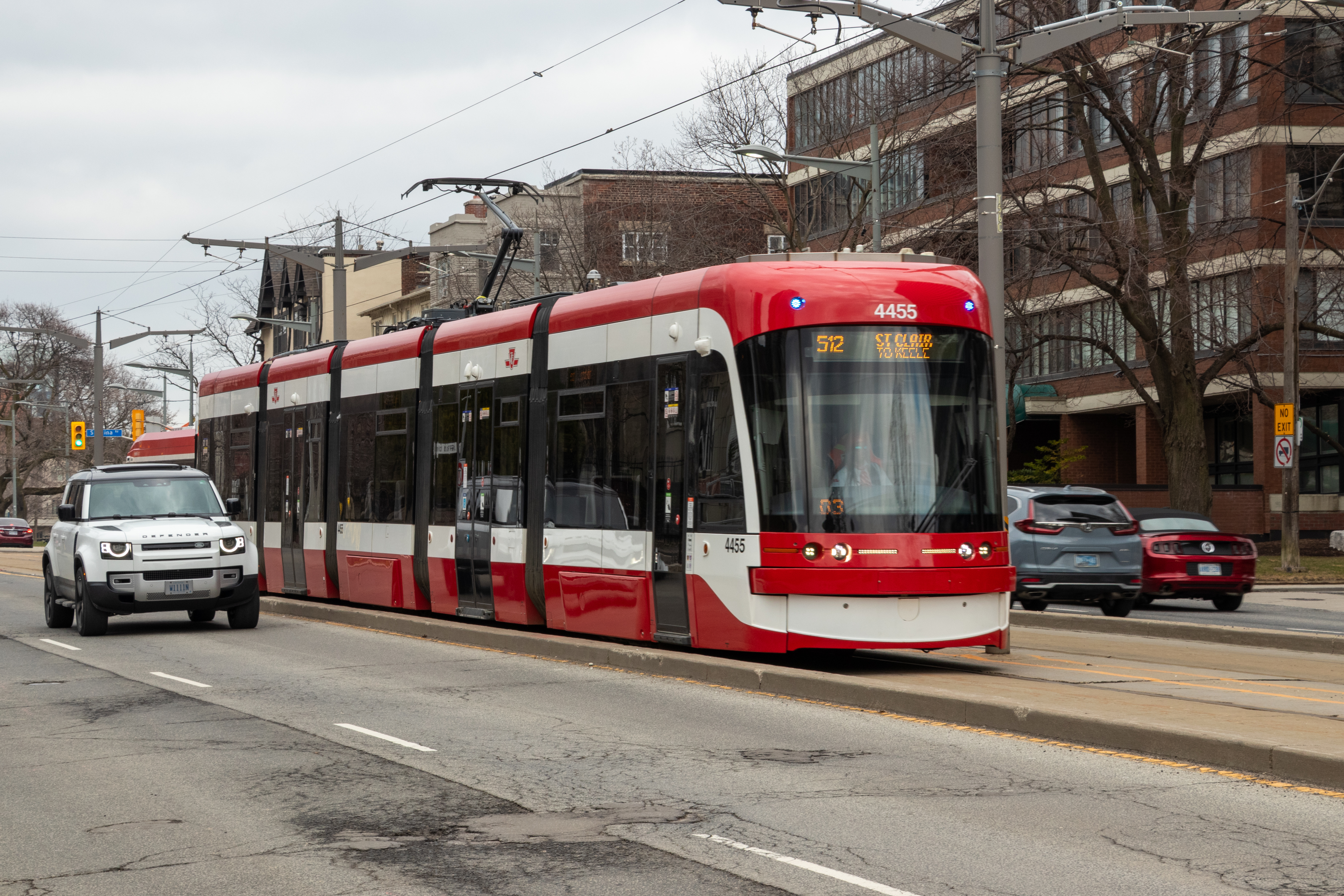
- 512 St. Clair streetcar west of Spadina Road

Overview
- Locale: Toronto, Ontario, Canada
- Termini: Gunns Loop (west); St. Clair station (east)
- Stations: St. Clair West; St. Clair
- Website: Official route page

Service
- Type: Streetcar route
- System: Toronto streetcar system
- Route number: 512 (312 overnight)
- Operator: Toronto Transit Commission
- Depot: Leslie Barns
- Rolling stock: Flexity Outlook
- Daily ridership: 25,800 (2025, weekdays)

History
- Opened: 1913; 113 years ago

Technical
- Line length: 7.1 km (4.41 mi)
- Track gauge: 4 ft 10 7/8 in (1,495 mm)
- Electrification: 600 V DC overhead

The 512 St. Clair (312 St. Clair during overnight periods) is an east–west streetcar route in Toronto, Ontario, Canada, operated by the Toronto Transit Commission (TTC). It operates on St. Clair Avenue between St. Clair station on the Line 1 Yonge–University subway and Gunns Road, just west of Keele Street.

== History ==
The Toronto Civic Railways opened the St. Clair streetcar route in 1913 along St. Clair Avenue West between Yonge Street and the Grand Trunk Railway crossing (near today's Caledonia Road) to serve small developed areas in a newly annexed section of the city. Previously, the only streetcar service near this area was the Davenport line of the Toronto Suburban Railway (along Davenport Road) and the Avenue route of the Toronto Railway Company (ending at Avenue Road and St. Clair Avenue). At the east end of the St. Clair line, passengers could connect with the radial cars of the Metropolitan line of the Toronto and York Radial Railway running on Yonge Street. The St. Clair line was double-track but had no loops or wyes; thus, all streetcars were double-ended.

After its creation in 1921, the Toronto Transportation Commission took over the assets of the Toronto Civic Railways and the Toronto Railway Company with the goal to connect and integrate the two separate streetcar systems. With respect to St. Clair, the TTC expanded the line eastwards and westwards, adding turning loops at end points and replacing double-ended streetcars with single-ended cars (initially ex–TRC cars). At the east end, the line would continue north from St. Clair Avenue East on Mount Pleasant Road to Eglinton Avenue; however, this portion would later become a separate route that was subsequently converted to bus operation in the 1970s.

By 1930, the Bay streetcar route was running north on Avenue Road and then west on St. Clair Avenue. Passengers could travel from St. Clair Avenue and Caledonia Road to Bay Street and Queens Quay. By 1932, Earlscourt Loop at St. Clair Avenue and Lansdowne Avenue became the western terminus of the Bay route. With the opening of the Yonge subway in 1954, the Bay route disappeared, and the Earlscourt route was created to replace the St. Clair portion of the former Bay route. The Earlscourt route ran between St. Clair station and Earlscourt Loop overlapping the St. Clair route. Around early 1978, the TTC announced plans to number all streetcar routes, and the St. Clair route was to be number 512. Route numbers began being displayed on the route on February 4, 1980, when the service was still operated entirely by PCC streetcars. The Earlscourt route was merged into the 512 St. Clair in April 1980.

=== Timeline ===
Date	Event
August 25, 1913	The Toronto Civic Railways opens the St. Clair streetcar line from Yonge Street west to the Grand Trunk Railway crossing near today's Caledonia Road.
September 1, 1921	The Toronto Transportation Commission takes over operations of the Toronto Civic Railways and the Toronto Railway Company.
December 21, 1921	The Bathurst streetcar line is extended to St. Clair Avenue. Today, this is the only remaining connection between the St. Clair streetcar line and the rest of the Toronto streetcar system.
December 26, 1921	The TTC joins the TRC's Avenue Road streetcar line to the TCR St. Clair line. Streetcars on the Avenue route operate to a new streetcar loop at today's Caledonia Road. Single-ended ex–TRC streetcars replace the double-ended ex–TCR cars west of Avenue Road.
December 1, 1924	The St. Clair line is extended east of Yonge Street to Moore Park Loop at Mt. Pleasant Road.
November 4, 1925	The line is extended north along Mt. Pleasant Road to the Mt. Pleasant Loop at Eglinton Avenue. It replaces an early trolley bus line.
October 29, 1931	The line is extended westwards to Townsley Loop at Old Weston Road.
May 14, 1932	The line is again extended westwards to Keele Loop on Weston Road, a short distance north of St. Clair Avenue.
September 23, 1938	St. Clair becomes the first route in Toronto to be served by PCC streetcars.
September 1, 1943	The St. Clair route begins to provide rush hour service north along Weston Road, beyond Keele Loop, to Avon Loop at Rogers Road.
March 30, 1954	St. Clair station opens, hosting three streetcar routes with four destinations: Keele Loop and Mt. Pleasant Loop (St. Clair route), Earlscourt Loop (at Lansdowne Avenue, Earlscourt route), Bicknell Loop (Rogers route, rush hours). All routes go around the same single-track station loop where passengers can connect with the Toronto subway.
February 26, 1966	St. Clair rush hour streetcar service along Weston Road to Avon Loop is discontinued.
March 30, 1975	The Mount Pleasant arm of the line becomes a separate route, operating between St. Clair station and Eglinton Avenue.
July 25, 1976	Buses replace the Mount Pleasant streetcar route that ran east from St. Clair Station. However, the section of the line between St. Clair station and Moore Park Loop is retained for night streetcars until October 1, 1976. The site of Moore Park Loop subsequently becomes Loring-Wyle Parkette.
January 27, 1978	St. Clair West station opens with an underground streetcar loop. The St. Clair route becomes the first to have an underground connection with the subway. (The new underground section of streetcar line had opened on September 18, 1977, four months before the subway station opened.)
February 4, 1980	Streetcars on the St. Clair route begin displaying a route number for the first time, when PCC streetcars begin showing "512" on their destination signs on this route.
April 16, 1980	The Canadian Light Rail Vehicle starts revenue service on the St. Clair route. On the same date, the Earlscourt route, which was a shortened version of the St. Clair route, is folded into 512 St. Clair.
July 27, 1981	Gunns Loop opens at Gunns Road, replacing the old Keele Loop on Weston Road.
February 9, 1987	The 312 St. Clair streetcar route is introduced to provide night service. Like 512 St. Clair, 312 St. Clair runs between St. Clair station and Gunns Loop.
March 20, 2000	Blue Night service is converted to bus operation, extending to Jane Station.
July 31, 2005	Time-based transfer are introduced for the first time in the TTC along 512 St. Clair as a pilot project.
September 6, 2015	312 St. Clair night bus is renamed "312 St. Clair – Junction".
September 3, 2017	The Flexity Outlook streetcars enter service to phase out CLRVs on the St. Clair route. The time-based transfer pilot project ends.
August 26, 2018	Time-based transfers are reintroduced throughout the TTC system, including 512 St. Clair, for users of the Presto card.
October 1, 2018	With Flexity Outlook streetcars having replaced CLRVs on this route, 512 St. Clair becomes the third route in Toronto to use pantographs for electrical pickup.
June 23, 2024	The 312 St. Clair streetcar route is restored. Service west of Gunns is replaced by the 340 Junction night bus.

=== Dedicated right-of-way ===
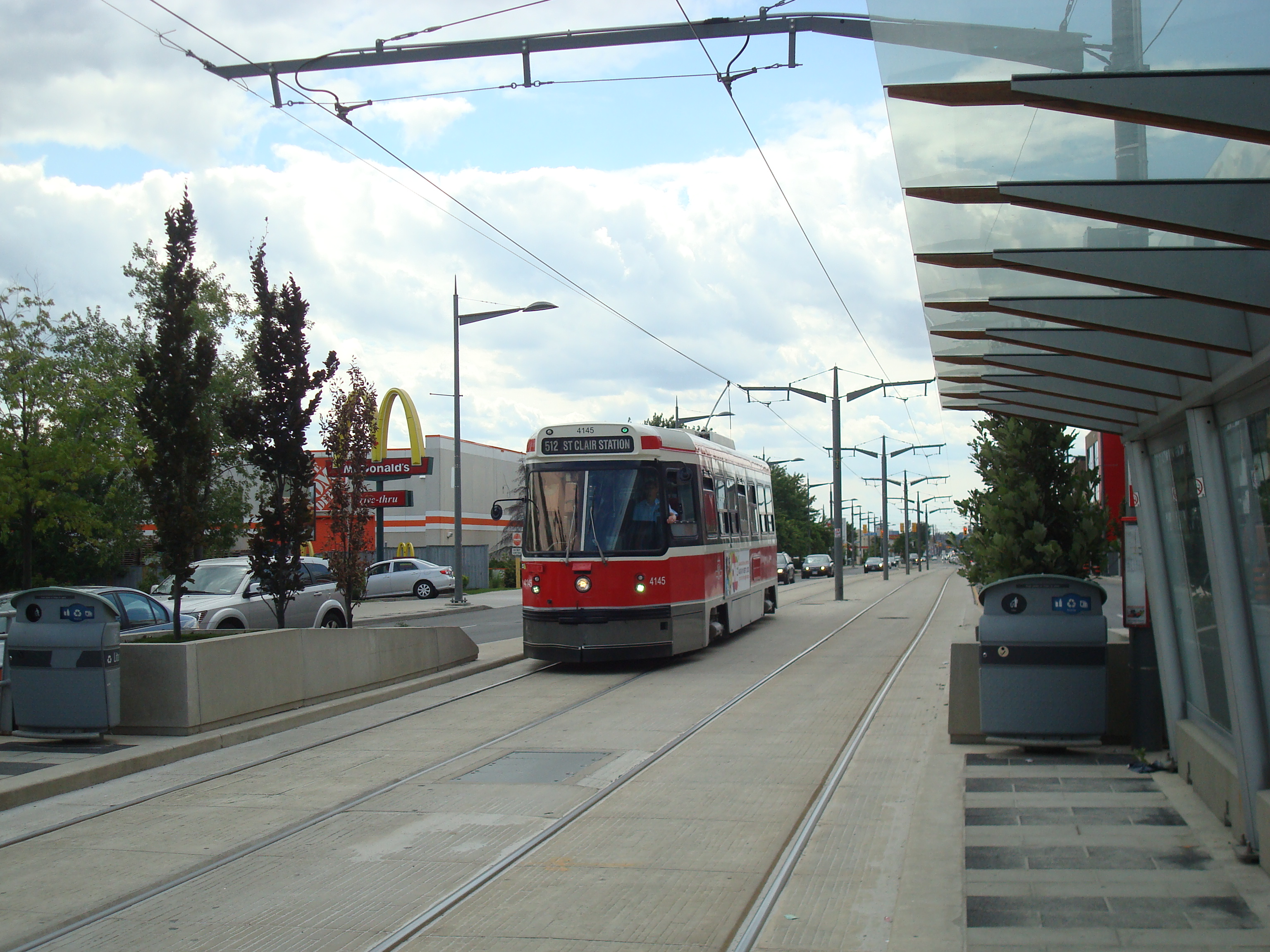
Streetcar arriving at Keele from Gunns Loop

When first built in 1913, the St. Clair streetcar operated in a dedicated right-of-way in the centre of St. Clair Avenue, similar to today's 512 St. Clair route. A dedicated right-of-way is a lane generally in the centre of the street, reserved for transit vehicles. However, it was removed between 1928 and 1935 and replaced with paved trackage open to mixed traffic.

However, since then, road traffic had increased and was degrading the reliability of streetcar service. Given the success of the new 510 Spadina route along dedicated right-of-ways on Spadina and Queens Quay and on portions on several streetcar routes, the TTC proposed to upgrade the St. Clair streetcar line to a dedicated right-of-way. The tracks along the route needed replacement, and the TTC estimated that building a dedicated right-of-way would cost only $7 million more than simply replacing the tracks. Furthermore, St. Clair Avenue is one of the few streets in Toronto wide enough to accommodate a dedicated right-of-way without significantly reducing the width of traffic lanes.

In 2004, Toronto City Council decided to proceed with the proposal. Construction started on September 25, 2005, and was completed in three stages: From St. Clair station to Vaughan Road on February 18, 2007, to Lansdowne Avenue on December 20, 2009, and finally with full service to Gunns Loop on June 30, 2010. On December 19, 2009, the day prior to the opening of the section from Vaughan Road to Lansdowne Avenue, there was a pre-opening event using the TTC's two remaining PCC streetcars.

=== Time-based transfers ===
==== St. Clair pilot (2005–2017) ====
From July 31, 2005, until September 2, 2017, the TTC ran a pilot project of providing 2-hour time-based transfers on this route as a temporary measure to support business along St. Clair during the construction projects of the new dedicated streetcar right-of-way scheme, under which passengers who took a paper transfer after paying their fares by cash or tokens were allowed to disembark and re-board another 512 streetcar, even one going in the opposite direction, as long as they did so within 2 hours of their original boarding. This meant that one could stop part-way through a journey and then continue, or even make a round trip, without paying multiple fares.

From December 14, 2015, until September 3, 2017, passengers who paid by cash or token were required to obtain a time-based paper transfer as a result of the proof-of-payment (POP) system that had come into effect on all TTC streetcar routes as passengers could have been asked at any time to show POP. At the time, the Presto card readers on the 512 cars were not configured to handle this special route-specific time-based transfer pilot scheme. Presto users who wished to take advantage of the project were required to board at the front door of the vehicle in order to obtain the special paper time-based transfer after tapping their cards on the fare reader there, or else they would have been charged another fare every time they re-tapped on the same route.

The pilot program was discontinued on September 3, 2017, the same day the new Flexity Outlook streetcars were deployed on the 512 route, as drivers of the new streetcars are situated inside a fully enclosed cab and are not responsible for handling fare collection or providing paper transfers.

==== Presto ====
The TTC reintroduced a 2-hour time-based transfer on August 26, 2018, but this time system-wide rather than for just the 512 route. It is currently available only to customers paying with Presto, credit or debit card on a Presto fare device.

=== Proposed extensions ===
About 2007, two plans had been proposed to extend the St. Clair line west of Gunns Loop, but neither is active today. At the time, transit advocate Steve Munro thought that extensions west of Gunns Loop might lack the ridership to be justified.

The first proposal would see Route 512 extended west along St. Clair Avenue West to Runnymede Road, and south underneath the Canadian Pacific Railway Galt Subdivision line to a bus loop at Runnymede Road and Dundas Street West, replacing a portion of route 71A Runnymede. Streetcar tracks would then be extended southeast along Dundas Street West to Dundas West station where the 504 King and 505 Dundas streetcar routes currently terminate. The tracks on Dundas would be served by a new route replacing the current 40 Junction bus route. While the scheme may not be warranted by potential ridership, it would cut down the amount of deadhead (not-in-service) time required by St. Clair streetcars to get to St. Clair Avenue.

The other proposal comes as part of Transit City, the Light Rail expansion proposal. It would see route 512 extended west on St. Clair all the way to Jane Street, replacing portions of routes 71A Runnymede (now replaced by route 189 Stockyards) and 79B Scarlett Road, where it would connect with a planned Jane Street LRT.

== Route description ==
Route 512 St. Clair serves St. Clair Avenue between St. Clair station at the east end of the line, and Gunns Loop at Gunns Road at the west end. The route passes through St. Clair West station in both directions. The route operates almost entirely within a dedicated streetcar right-of-way, with mixed traffic for a short distance east of Yonge Street and for very short distances at streetcar loops. There are five turning loops along the line; besides the station loops at St. Clair and St. Clair West stations, the other loops are Oakwood Loop at Oakwood Avenue, Earlscount Loop at Lansdowne Avenue, and Gunns Loop at Gunns Road. The streetcar tracks along Bathurst Street and Vaughan Road are the only connection between the St. Clair streetcar line and the rest of the Toronto streetcar system.

According to a 2011 Torontoist article, it took 29 minutes for the author to travel from St. Clair station to Gunns Loop shortly after the rush hour.

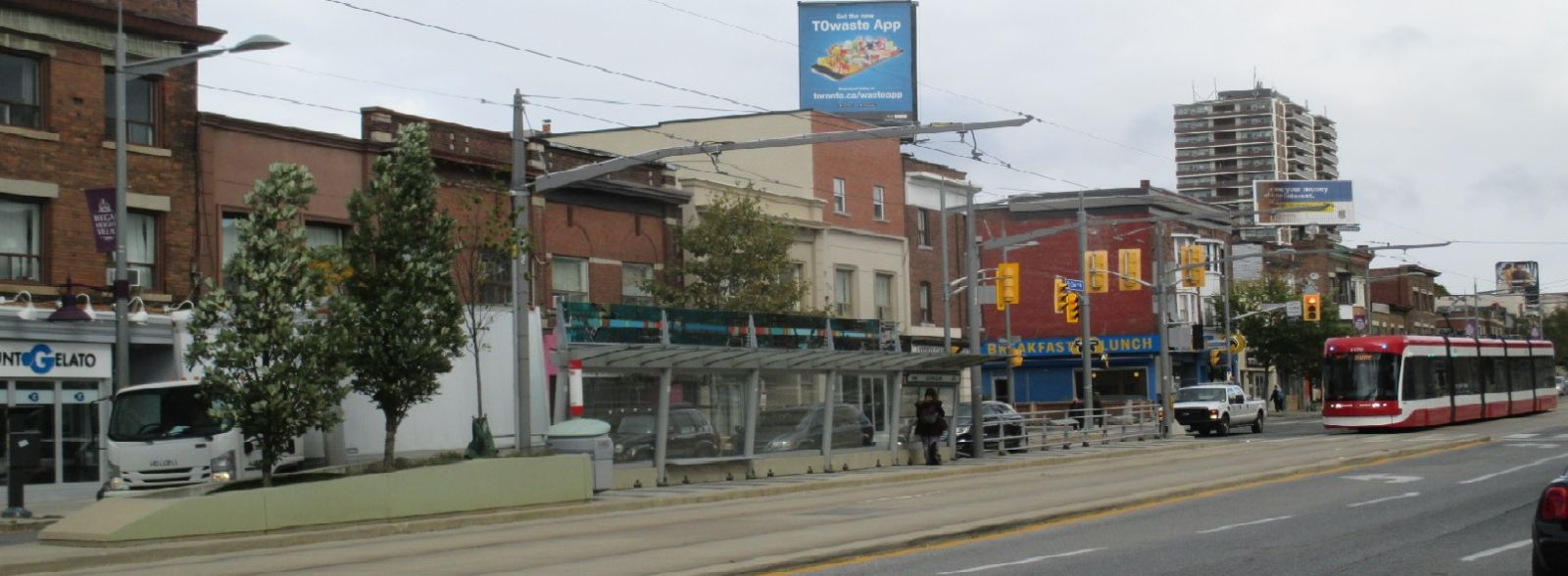
Stop layout: Signaled crossing (right), shelter, artwork along shelter roof, planter (left)

With the exception of stops at turning loops, all stops along the route are on-street surface stops with islands separating the regular traffic from the streetcar tracks and have streetcar traffic signals, partial shelters, and railings to protect patrons from the traffic. One end of each platform connects to a pedestrian crossing at a signalized street intersection. The other end of the platform has a planter. There are 22 on-street stops serving both directions and two serving just one direction: Old Stock Yards (eastbound) and Yonge (westbound), both near a terminus.

Half of the on-street stops have artwork consisting of vertical panels along the shelter roof. If an on-street stop has both eastbound and westbound platforms, only one of the two platforms displays artwork. Various artists were selected by competition to design the art pieces.

Streetcar service is provided 24 hours per day along the full length of the route. The overnight trips operate as the 312 St. Clair, which runs along the same route as 512 St. Clair.

== See also ==
- Toronto streetcar system
- Toronto Transit Commission
- Rogers Road streetcar line

== Bibliography ==
- Bromley, John F., and Jack May. Fifty Years of Progressive Transit, Electric Railroaders' Association, New York (New York), 1978.
- Filey, Mike. Not a One-Horse Town: 125 Years of Toronto and its Streetcars, Gagne Printing, Louiseville (Quebec), 1986.
- Hood, J. William (1986). The Toronto Civic Railways: An Illustrated History. Toronto, Ontario: The Upper Canada Railway Society.
- Springirth, Kenneth C. (2014). Toronto Streetcars Serve The City. Foothill Media. ISBN 978-1-62545-028-9.
