= St. Clair station =

Toronto subway station

St. Clair
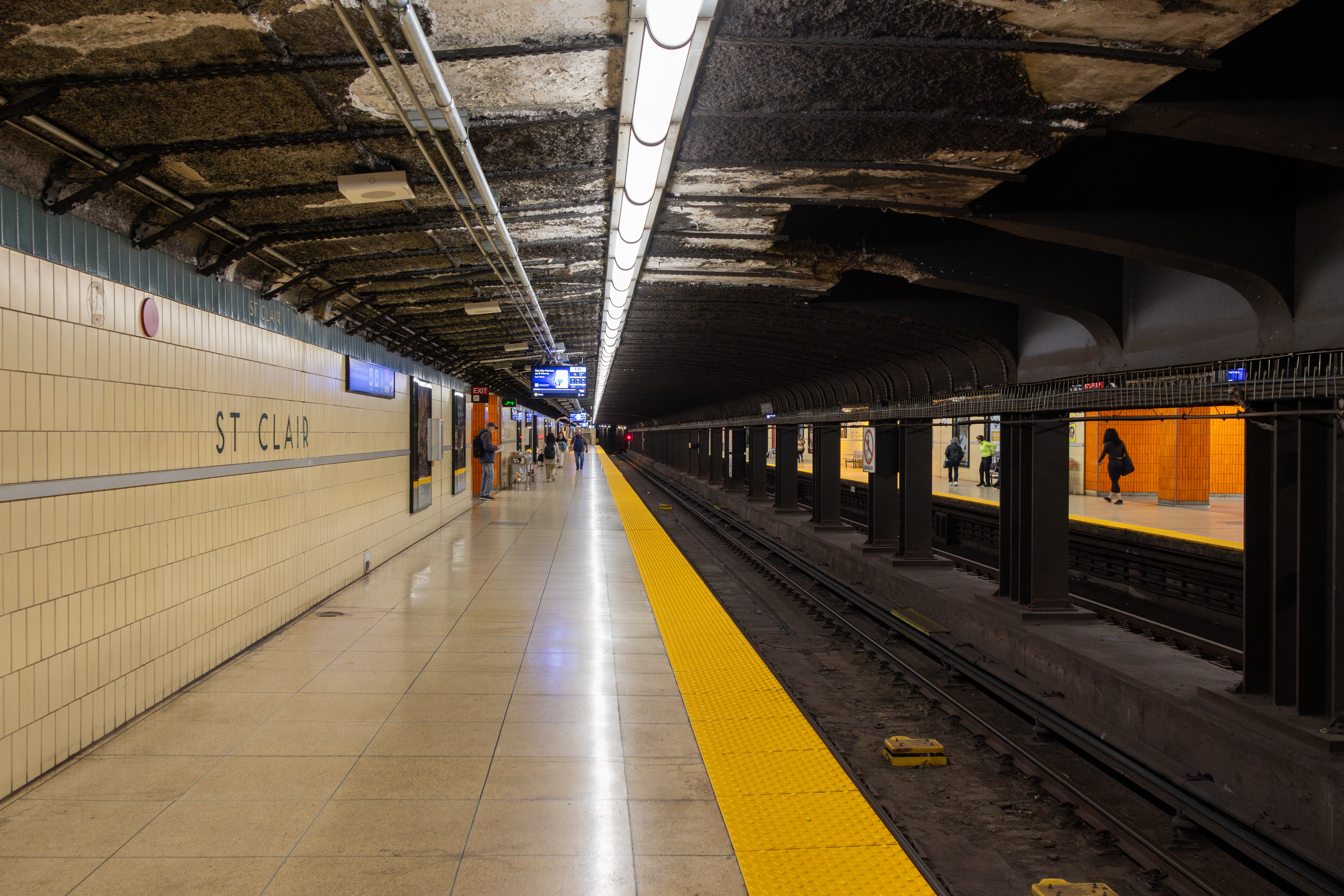

General information
- Location: 15 St. Clair Avenue East; Toronto, Ontario; Canada
- Coordinates: 43°41′17″N 79°23′37″W
- Platforms: Side platforms
- Tracks: 2
- Connections: TTC buses and streetcars: 74 Mt Pleasant; 88 South Leaside; 97 Yonge; 312 St Clair; 320 Yonge; 512 St Clair

Construction
- Structure type: Underground
- Accessible: Yes

Other information
- Website: Official station page

History
- Opened: March 30, 1954; 72 years ago

Passengers
- 2023–2024: 27,336
- Rank: 20 of 70

Services
Preceding station	Toronto Transit Commission	Following station
Summerhill towards Vaughan	Line 1 Yonge–University	Davisville towards Finch
Deer Park Crescent towards Gunns Loop	512 St. Clair	Terminus
Yonge Street Westbound only towards Gunns Loop	512 St. Clair	Terminus
Location

St. Clair is a subway station on Line 1 Yonge–University in Toronto, Ontario, Canada. The station opened in 1954 as part of the original Yonge Street subway.

== Description ==
The station is located between St. Clair Avenue East and Pleasant Boulevard behind the buildings on the east side of Yonge Street. The station has three vertical levels: Main entrance level (level with St. Clair Avenue), concourse level (level with Pleasant Boulevard) and subway platform level. There are elevators, escalators and stairways connecting the levels.

The station has four entrances, all of which accept Presto, credit or debit cards:

- Main entrance is at street level on its south side of St. Clair Avenue East. This is a staffed, wheelchair-accessible entrance. There is a McDonald's restaurant within the station building beside the entrance door.
- The secondary entrance, also wheelchair accessible, is located at the concourse level which is also street level with Pleasant Boulevard. This used to be staffed entrance, until January 5, 2020, when it was converted to a full-time automated entrance.
- A third entrance is from the concourse level of St. Clair Centre at 2 St. Clair Avenue East, at the northeast corner with Yonge Street. Stairs at the entrance lead down to the subway platforms.
- A fourth entrance, open during peak hours, is accessed from 1 St. Clair Avenue East (Scotiabank), a building at the southeast corner of the intersection with Yonge Street. Stairs lead to the station concourse level.

The St. Clair streetcar loop runs counter-clockwise behind buildings on the south side St. Clair Avenue East. There are two streetcar platforms within the fare-paid zone: an arrival platform roughly perpendicular to St. Clair Avenue, and a departure platform parallel to the avenue. Both platforms are on the main entrance level.

A bus terminal is located on the south side of the station parallel to and accessed from Pleasant Boulevard. It is on the concourse level within the fare-paid zone next to the station's secondary entrance. A multi-storey building stands over the bus roadway and platform.

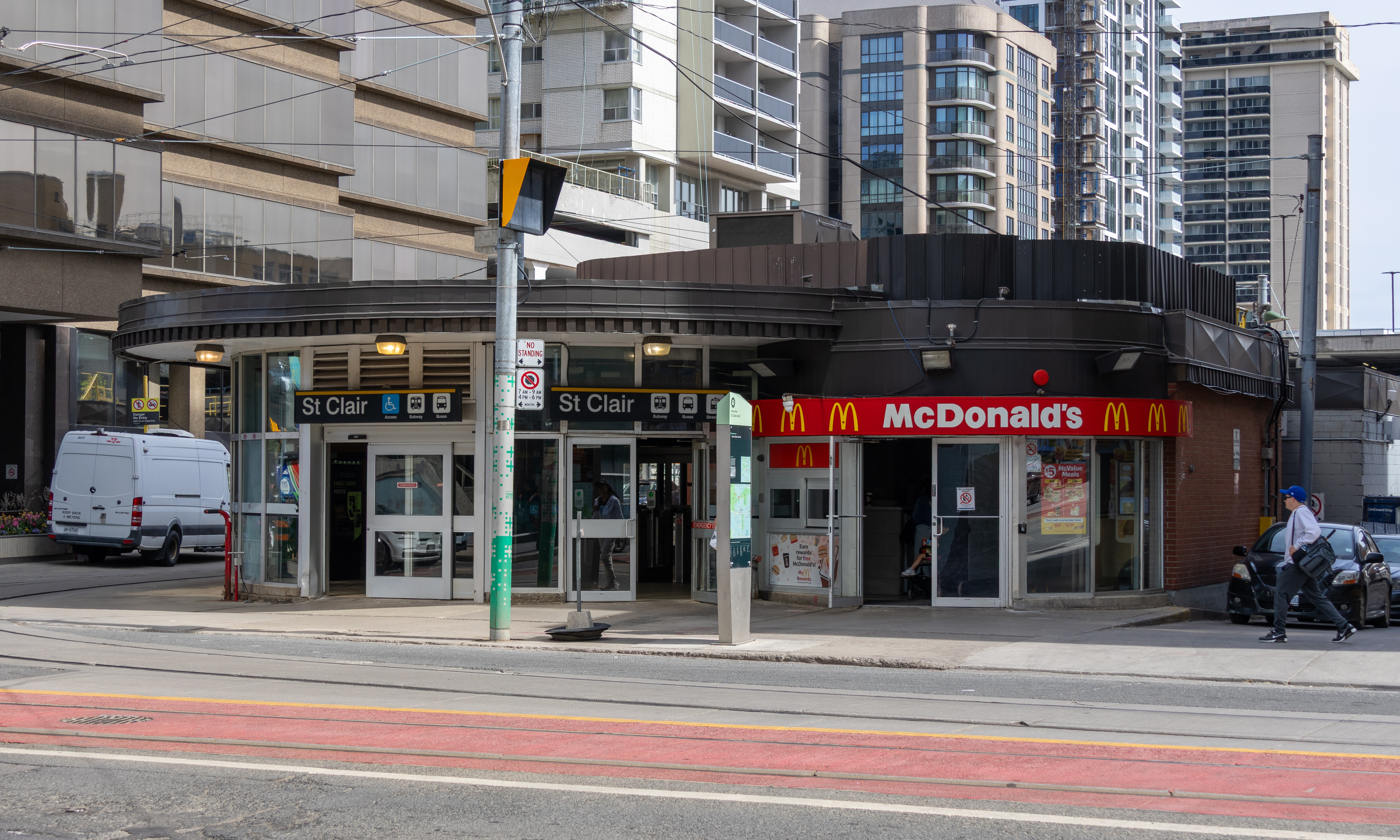
Entrance on south side of St. Clair Avenue, just east of Yonge Street

== History ==
On March 30, 1954, the station opened along with the original Yonge subway (Eglinton to Union station).

Originally, in 1954, the station's streetcar loop handled streetcars coming from Mount Pleasant Road as well as St. Clair Avenue West. Three routes with four destinations used to pass through the loop all sharing the same track. The streetcar services at the loop were:

- St. Clair route, both westbound to Keele Street and eastbound to Mount Pleasant Road and Eglinton Avenue
- Earlscourt route, westbound to Lansdowne Avenue
- Rogers route (rush hour service), westbound to Rogers Road and Bicknell Avenue

In 1974, the Rogers streetcar route was converted to bus, ending direct rush-hour service between Rogers Road and St. Clair station. This abandonment was due to a streetcar shortage.

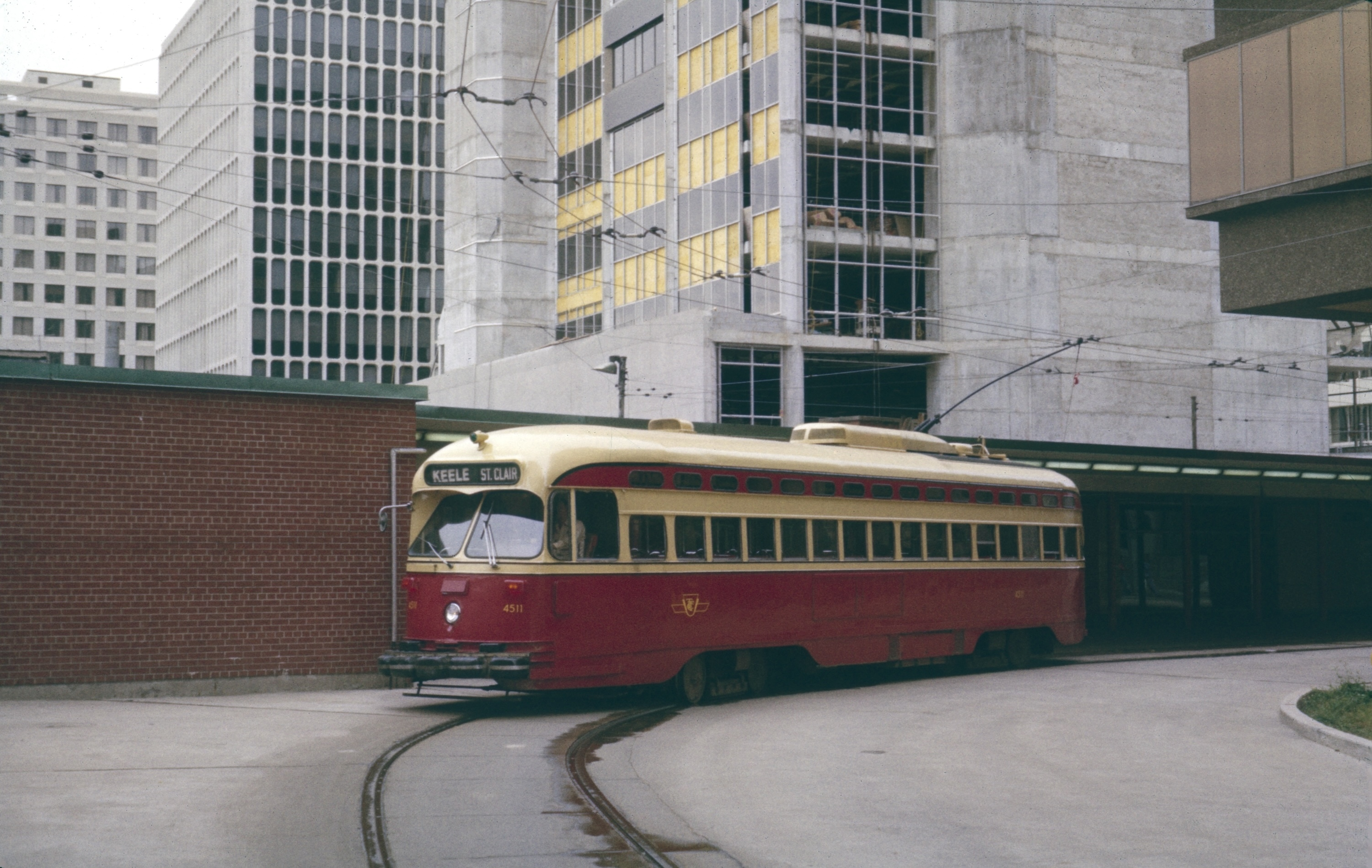
A PCC streetcar in the surface loop at St. Clair station in 1978

On March 30, 1975, the St. Clair route east of St. Clair station became the separate Mt. Pleasant streetcar route. This ended the one-seat ride from Mount Pleasant Road to St. Clair Avenue West thus forcing a change of vehicle at St. Clair station.

On July 25, 1976, the Mt. Pleasant streetcar line was converted to diesel bus, ending streetcar service east of St. Clair station. The Metro Roads Department, responding to complaints from motorists about streetcars on Mount Pleasant Road slowing traffic, forced the line's abandonment.

On November 29, 1977, trolley buses replaced diesel buses on route 74 Mt. Pleasant and followed the former streetcar route; thus, the Mount Pleasant trolley buses used the streetcar loop and platforms at St. Clair station rather than the bus terminal. The trolley buses operated out of the Eglinton Garage, the site being used today as the Eglinton station bus terminal.

In 1978, the Earlscourt and St. Clair streetcar routes were merged as the 512 route. With the introduction of the CLRV, streetcar destination signs showed a route number instead of a route name. With this change, St. Clair station served only one streetcar route, although some 512 streetcars continued to be signed as terminating at Lansdowne Avenue during the rush hours.

On December 28, 1991, after the TTC decided to decommission its entire trolley bus system, the trolley buses on route 74 Mt. Pleasant were replaced by diesel buses, which again used the station's bus terminal.

Since 2007, the station has been fully accessible with the addition of elevators, escalators and stairway connecting all levels.

== Subway infrastructure in the vicinity ==
North of the station, the tunnel jogs west to cross to the west side of Yonge Street. At the Muir Portal the line runs in an open cut for 1.3 kilometres, between Yonge Street and the Davisville Yard, the TTC's original subway yard.

South of the station, the train continues to travel in a tunnel. Originally, the area south of the station was open-cut until Summerhill Avenue, immediately before Summerhill station; the line continued in open cut as far as Pleasant Boulevard, just before the next station to the north, St. Clair. Various sections of this open cut were roofed over as the years passed, and since the early 1980s it has been entirely under cover, except when one block was opened out and re-covered, to allow new construction above it. Passengers who look out into the tunnel on this section can still see the sloping sides of the original cut, the stumps of lamp posts and trees, and the undersides of four road bridges.

== Nearby landmarks ==
Nearby landmarks include the David A. Balfour Park (Vale of Avoca section of Rosedale ravine), St. Michael's Cemetery, Deer Park, Moore Park, Upper Canada College, and Forest Hill.

== Surface connections ==
TTC routes serving the station include:

Bay number	Route	Name	Additional information
1	97A	Yonge	Northbound to Steeles Avenue
1	97B	Yonge	Northbound to Steeles Avenue via Yonge Boulevard
2	Line 1 shuttle bus replacement service		
3	88A	South Leaside	Eastbound to Thorncliffe Park Drive via Overlea Boulevard
3	88B	South Leaside	Eastbound to Thorncliffe Park Drive via Wicksteed Avenue
4	74	Mount Pleasant	Northbound to Eglinton station
4	Wheel-Trans		
N/A	312	St. Clair	Blue Night service streetcar; westbound to Gunns Loop (west of Keele Street)
N/A	512	St. Clair	Streetcar; westbound to Gunns Loop (west of Keele Street)
N/A	97C	Yonge	Northbound to Eglinton station and southbound to Union station (Rush hour service; on-street stop outside station)
N/A	320	Yonge	Blue Night service; northbound to Steeles Avenue and southbound to Queens Quay (On-street stop outside station)
