= Gunns Loop =

Streetcar loop and station in Toronto, Canada

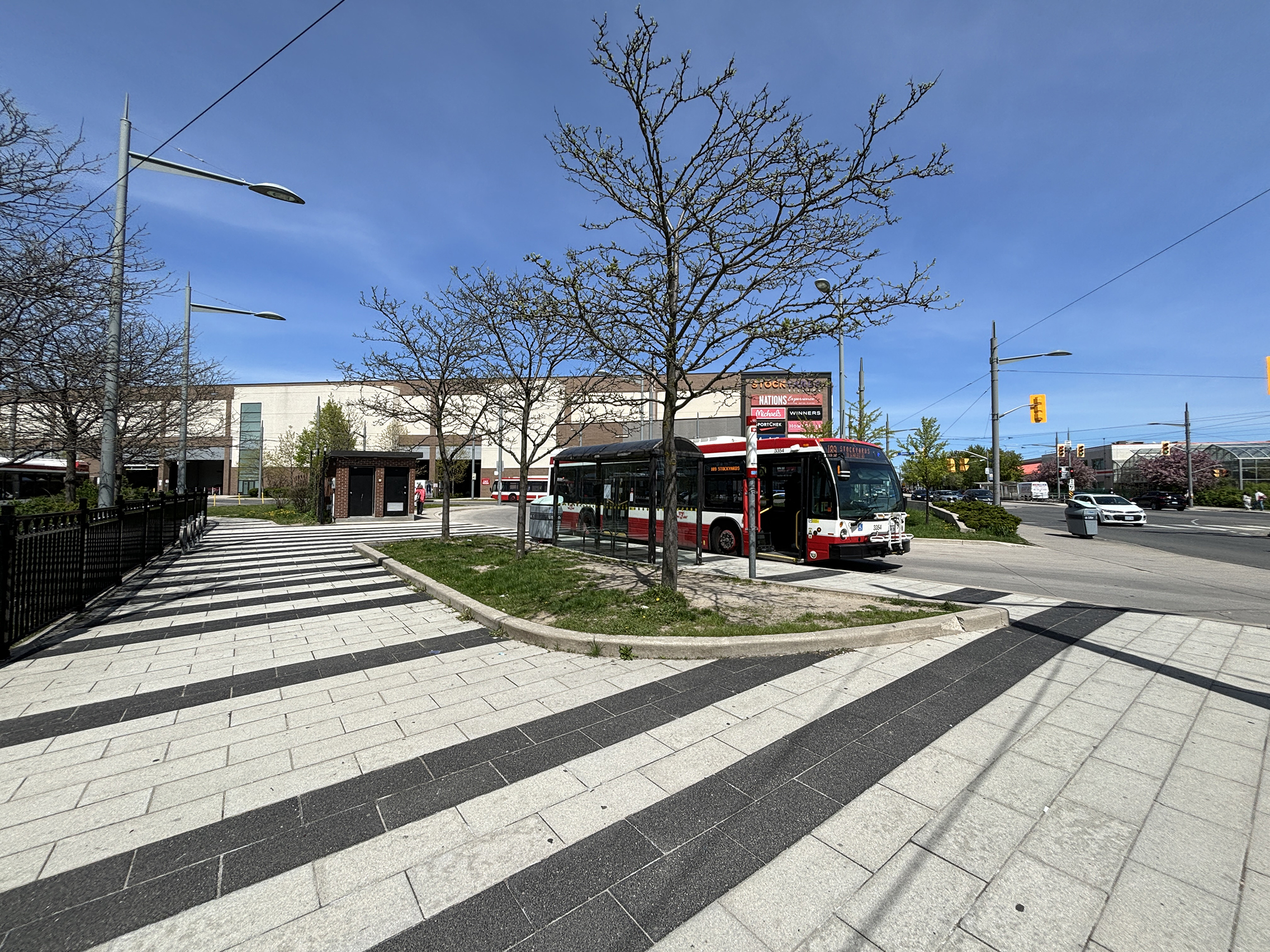

General information
- Location: St. Clair Avenue West; Toronto, Ontario; Canada
- Coordinates: 43°40′19″N 79°28′17″W
- Owner: Toronto Transit Commission
- Platforms: 2 - separate area for buses and streetcars
- Tracks: 1
- Connections: TTC buses

Construction
- Structure type: Small service building for staff washroom

History
- Opened: 27 July 1981

Services
Preceding station	Toronto Transit Commission	Following station
Terminus	512 St. Clair	Keele Street towards St. Clair
Terminus	512 St. Clair	Old Stock Yards Eastbound only towards St. Clair
Location

Gunns Loop is a station and turning loop at the western terminus of the 512 St. Clair streetcar line of the Toronto Transit Commission (TTC). It is located at the northwest corner of St. Clair Avenue West and Gunns Road, a block west of Keele Street, in Toronto.

== History ==
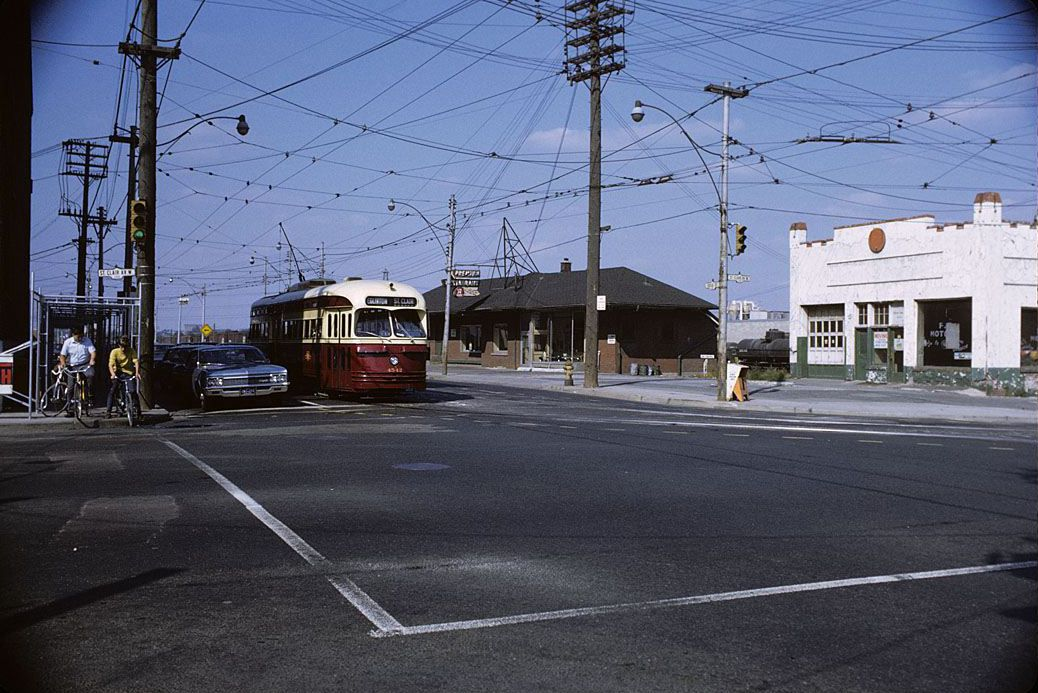
PCC streetcar coming from the Keele Loop and turning eastbound

Prior to construction of the dedicated right-of-way, the terminus of the 512 St. Clair route had been at the Keele Loop, just north of St. Clair Avenue where Weston Road merges with Keele Street.

The loop is named for nearby Gunns Road, which in turn is named after Gunns Limited, a West Toronto abattoir founded by businessman Donald Gunn of Beaverton, Ontario.

The old loop was closed and service began to the new loop in 1981. Signs on westbound 512 St. Clair streetcars still indicate Keele as the destination, when they are actually terminating at Gunns.

== Services ==
A small building provides washroom facilities for TTC operators. There is a platform and upgraded new design shelter for people waiting for streetcars, while bus passengers have a regular bus shelter.

As well as being the terminus for the 512 St. Clair streetcar, the loop is also served by the 189 Stockyards bus route which provides service farther west along St. Clair Avenue to Scarlett Road and south on Keele Street to Keele and High Park subway stations.
