= Miller Group =

Miller Group may refer to:

- Miller Group (construction company), transportation construction company based in Markham, Ontario, Canada
- Miller Group (marketing agency), based in Los Angeles
- Miller Group, property company based in Edinburgh, Scotland, see Miller Homes
