= York University busway =

Bus transit right-of-way in Toronto, Canada

Coordinates: 43.7684°N 79.484°W

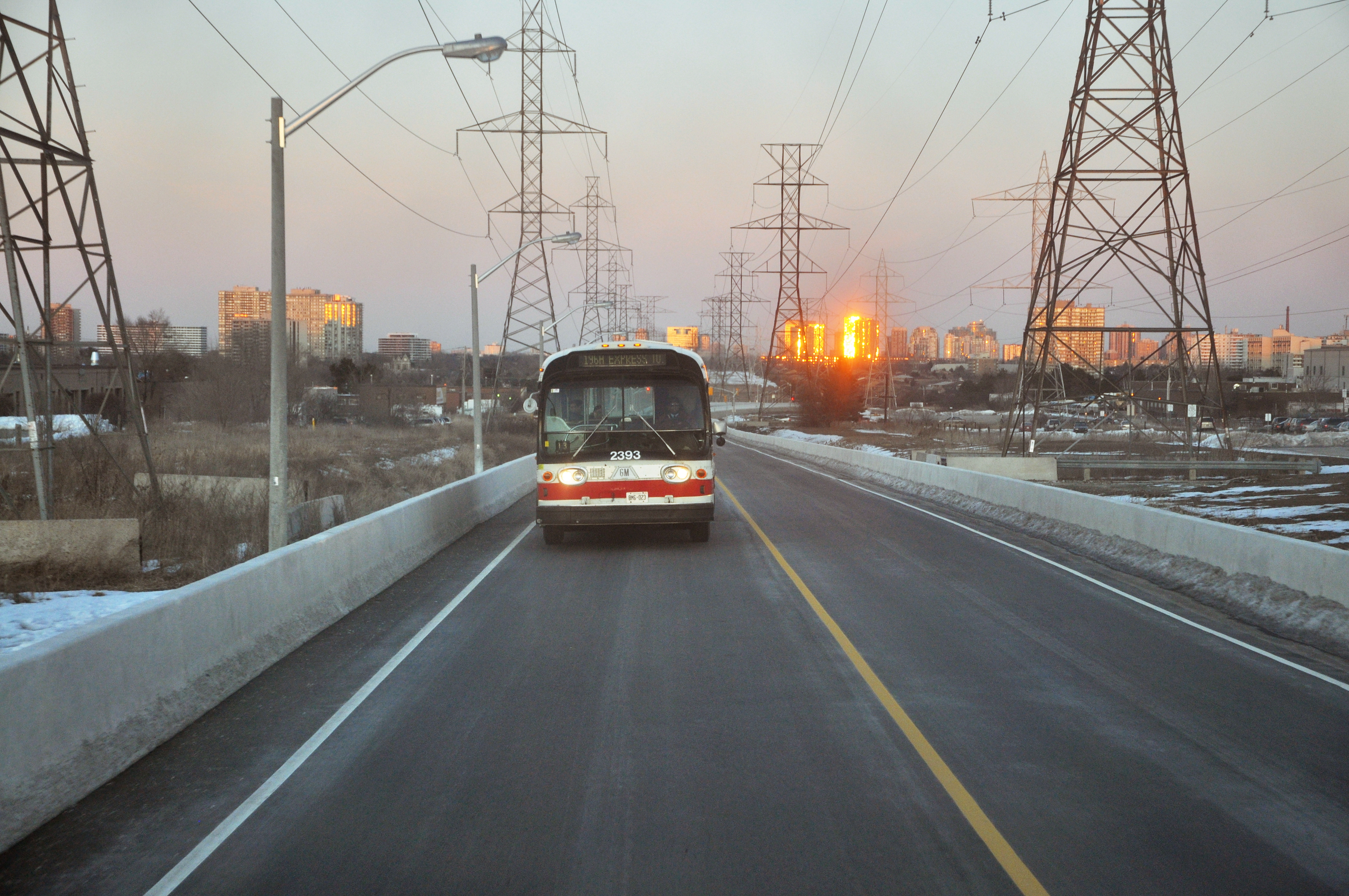
- Busway in 2009

Overview
- System: TTC bus system
- Operator: Toronto Transit Commission (TTC)
- Began service: November 20, 2009

Routes
- Routes: 939B Finch Express
- Locale: Toronto, Ontario, Canada
- Start: Dufferin Street north of Finch Avenue West
- End: Finch West station
- Length: 1.8 kilometres (1.1 mi)

The York University busway is a bus-only roadway in Toronto, Ontario, Canada, which stretches 1.8 kilometres (1.1 mi) from Finch West subway station to Dufferin Street. It is used by the Toronto Transit Commission's 939B Finch Express bus route.

The busway was constructed in 2009 as part of a series of bus-only roadways and bus lanes stretching 6.5 kilometres (4.0 mi) from Downsview station (now Sheppard West) to York University to serve the 196 York University Rocket bus rapid transit route. After the opening of the Toronto–York Spadina subway extension on December 17, 2017, route 196 was discontinued and the other segments of bus infrastructure were repurposed.

== History ==
=== Planning and construction ===
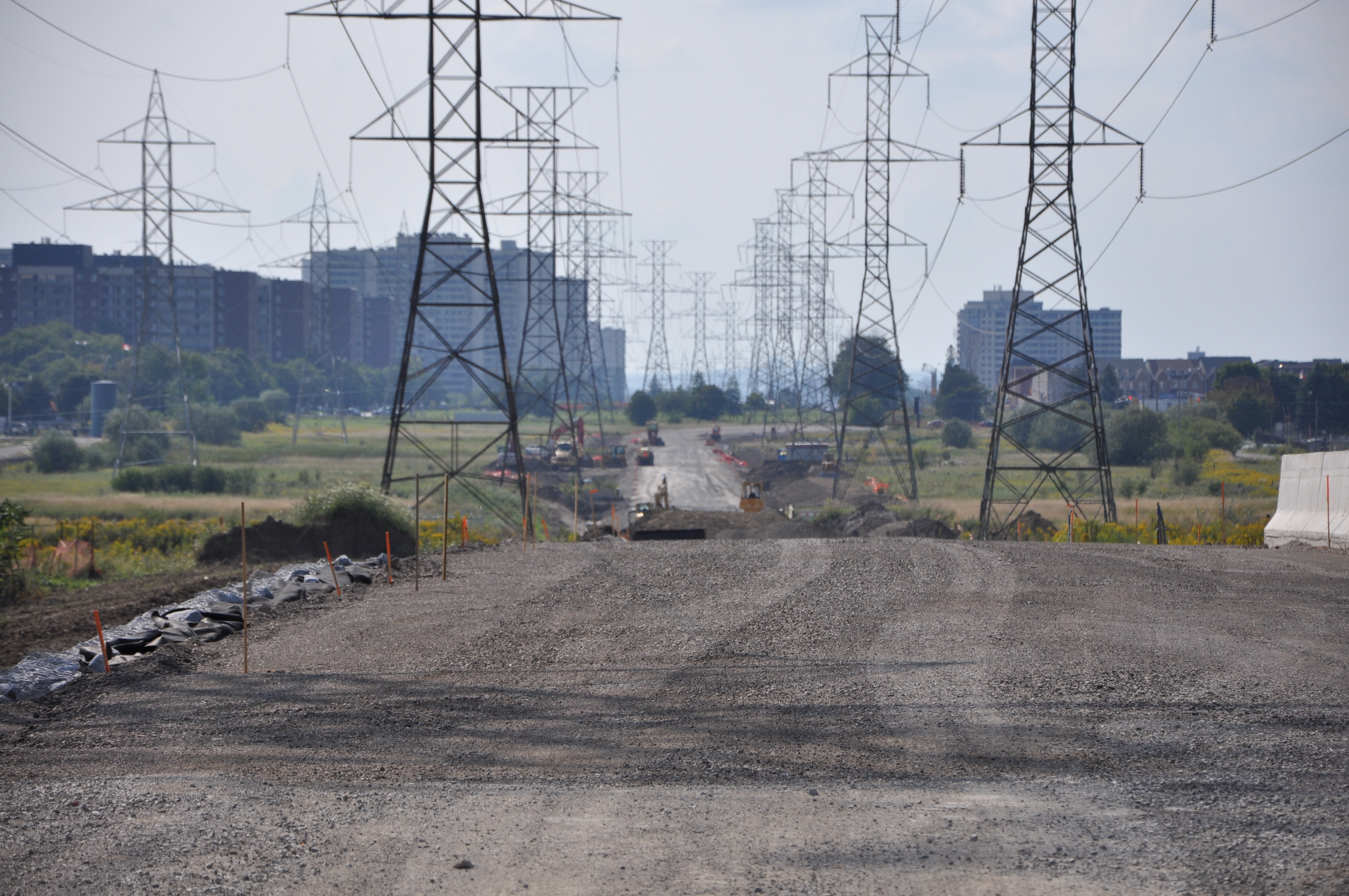
Hydro Corridor busway under construction in August 2009

The busway was proposed in 2004 as a series of busways and bus lanes connecting Downsview station (now Sheppard West) to York University, to increase speed and reliability on route 196 York University Rocket. The primary components of the work were a busway within York University, a busway within the Finch Hydro Corridor, and bus lanes on Dufferin Street / Allen Road.

Groundbreaking occurred on July 25, 2008, with completion planned for the fourth-quarter 2009 school term. During construction, it was discovered that a gas pipeline was closer to the surface than had been thought, so the busway in the hydro corridor had to be redesigned to accommodate it. This caused it to be delayed, and the only part that was open for the fourth-quarter 2009 school term was the busway within York University, which started operation on September 6, 2009. Consequently, route 196 buses continued to use Keele Street and Sheppard Avenue.

The final cost of the busway was $37.8 million, of which $18.4 million was contributed by the City of Toronto, and $9.7 million was contributed each from the Government of Canada and the Province of Ontario.

=== Initial operation ===
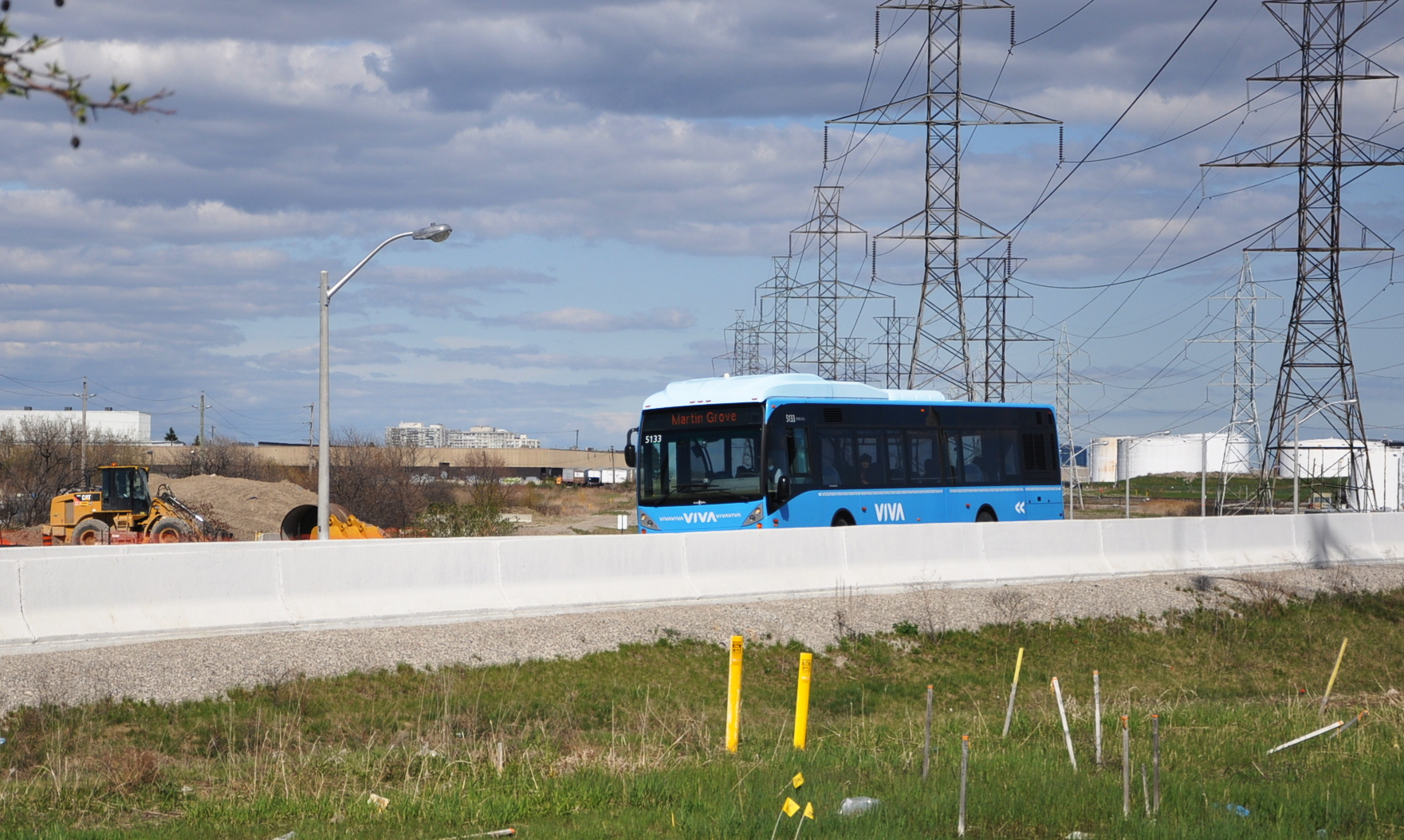
Viva Orange operating on the York University busway

The York University busway was officially opened on November 20, 2009, and route 196 was rerouted immediately. Other TTC routes using the busway were rerouted a week later.

The busway increased the average speed of route 196 by 41 percent, from 23.3 to 32.8 kilometres per hour (14.5 to 20.4 mph), making it the third-fastest TTC route at rush hour, after Line 3 Scarborough and route 192 Airport Rocket. Due to the savings in time from using the busway, service frequency on route 196 was increased from every 2 minutes 15 seconds to every 2 minutes while reducing the number of buses operating on the route from 20 to 16.

The 196 York University Rocket operated express from York University to Sheppard West Station, making two intermediate stops on Murray Ross Parkway at Keele Street, and on Dufferin Street at Finch Avenue. Some buses continued beyond Sheppard West Station to Sheppard-Yonge station, operating in mixed traffic along Sheppard Avenue.

From north to south, the route of the 196 consisted of:

- York University Commons – Bus only road and bus terminal: 0.6 km (0.37 mi)
- York Boulevard – Mixed traffic (east of Ian Macdonald Boulevard): 0.2 km (0.12 mi)
- "busway" – Dedicated bus only road within York University (Murray Ross Parkway to York Boulevard): 1.0 km (0.62 mi)
- Murray Ross Parkway – Mixed traffic (Keele Street to Evelyn Wiggins Drive): 0.1 km (0.062 mi)
- York University busway – Dedicated bus only road within Finch Hydro Corridor (from Dufferin Street to Keele Street): 2.1 km (1.3 mi)
- Allen Road / Dufferin Street – Painted bus lanes on arterial road: 2.7 km (1.7 mi)

Total length: ~6.5 km (4.0 mi)

In addition to route 196, other TTC routes used portions of the bus infrastructure, including TTC routes 105 Dufferin North, 117 Alness, and 41E Keele Express.

On May 1, 2011, York Region Transit's Viva Orange route began using the entire length of the York University busway infrastructure from York University to Sheppard West.

On March 28, 2016, TTC route 199 Finch Rocket was extended westward to York University from its previous terminus at Finch Station as the 199B Finch Rocket. It traveled along the York University busway from Dufferin Street and Finch Avenue to York University.

In early 2010, the "busway on hydro corridor" was given the official name York University busway.

In 2016, the portion of the busway between Keele Street and Tangiers Road was closed and demolished to make way for the parking lot of the new Finch West station. Route 196 was consequently rerouted via Tangiers Road for the remainder of its existence.

=== After Line 1 extension ===
On December 17, 2017, TTC subway Line 1 was extended from Sheppard West station to Vaughan Metropolitan Centre station, including a stop at York University station. As a result, bus route 196 York University Rocket was discontinued.

Routes 199B Finch Rocket and 41E Keele Express were cut back to Finch West station rather than continuing to York University, and as a result the busway within York University (York Boulevard to Murray Ross Parkway) became disused. In September 2018, route 199B was renamed 939B Finch Express. In November 2018, route 41E was replaced by 941 Keele Express.

The bus lanes along Dufferin Street and Allen Road were converted to high-occupancy vehicle lanes in early 2018, as the remaining TTC and YRT bus services were not deemed worthy of a dedicated lane.

The portion of busway between York Boulevard and The Pond Road was closed in mid-2018 to allow the expansion of Seymour Schulich Building.

As of 2017, 939B is the only bus route using the busway.

== Description ==
The York University busway consists of a single lane in each direction with concrete Ontario Tall Wall barriers along the side. At the intersections with Tangiers Road and with Alness Street, traffic signals are equipped with transit signal priority to allow buses to pass through without stopping. To facilitate left turns from the curbside bus lanes on Dufferin Street onto the hydro corridor busway, there is a jughandle controlled by traffic signals.

Between Tangiers Road and Alness Street, the busway crosses GO Transit's Barrie line at grade.

TTC route 939B Finch Express uses the entire York University busway from Dufferin Street to Finch West station. But eastbound service from Finch West station exits the busway at Alness Street to head south to Finch Avenue in advance of Dufferin Street. As a result, the busway between Dufferin Street and Alness Street is only used in the westbound direction.

Subway shuttle buses use the busway during scheduled weekend closures.
