= Toronto Transit Commission bus system =

Bus system serving the Greater Toronto Area in Ontario, Canada

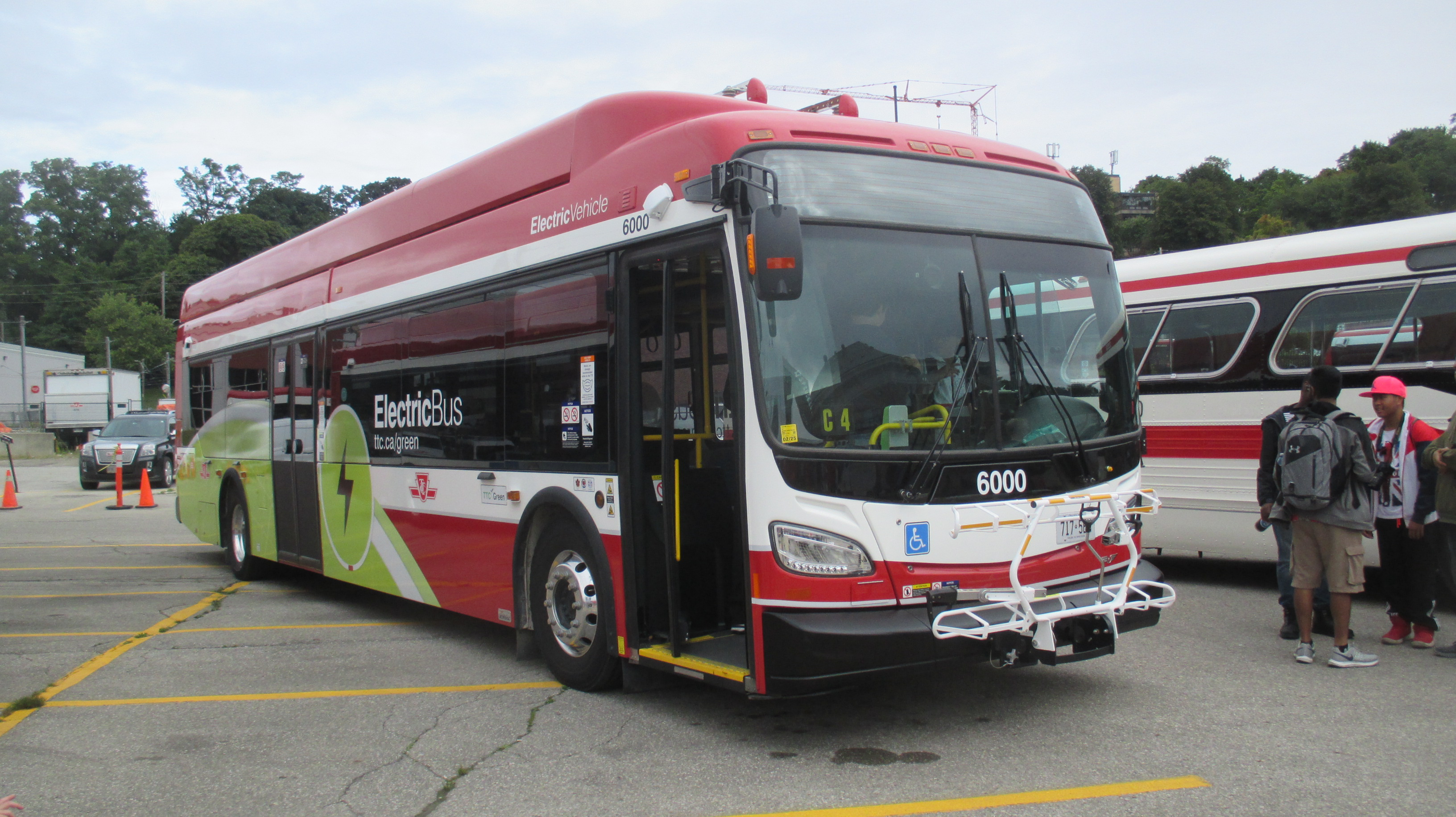
- A battery-electric New Flyer Xcelsior XE40 CHARGE NG in 2024
- Parent: Corporation of the City of Toronto
- Founded: 1 September 1921; 105 years ago
- Headquarters: William McBrien Building; 1900 Yonge Street; Toronto, Ontario, Canada
- Locale: Toronto
- Service area: Toronto, Mississauga, Vaughan, Markham
- Service type: 10-minute network, Local, Express, Night, Shuttle, Paratransit, Express bus service
- Alliance: GO Transit, MiWay, York Region Transit, Brampton Transit, Durham Region Transit
- Routes: 197 total (Note: As of July 2023); 127 regular service; 9 limited service; 4 seasonal service; 26 express network; 5 community; 26 Blue Night Network
- Fleet: 2124 12- and 18-metre buses; 285 minibuses (paratransit)
- Daily ridership: 1,093,600 (weekdays, Q2 2026)
- Annual ridership: approx. 389,129,000 unlinked boardings (2025); 192,512,039 revenue trips (2025)
- Fuel type: Diesel, hybrid electric, electric, gasoline
- Operator: Toronto Transit Commission
- Website: Bus routes

The Toronto Transit Commission (TTC) uses buses and other vehicles for public transportation. In 2025, the TTC has 205 bus routes in operation, including 28 night bus routes, carrying over 192 million revenue riders over 5,807.8 kilometres (3,608.8 mi) of routes with buses travelling 144 million kilometres (89 million mi) in the year. As of the second quarter of 2026, the system had a ridership of about 1,093,600 per weekday, including transfers.

Bus routes extend throughout the city and are integrated with the subway system and the streetcar system, with free transfers among the three systems. Many subway stations are equipped with bus terminals, and a few with streetcar terminals, located within a fare paid area.

As of 2025, the conventional bus system has about 2,100 buses in two bus lengths: 12-metre (40 ft) regular buses, and 18.3-metre (60 ft) articulated buses. Additionally, there are 285 eight-metre (26 ft) minibuses serving community bus routes and the Wheel-Trans paratransit system. Bus propulsion includes diesel, diesel-electric hybrid, battery-electric and gasoline. All buses are fully accessible with low floors and, except for minibuses, all are equipped with bicycle racks.

== History ==
=== 19th and 20th centuries ===
Bus service in Toronto began in 1849, when the first public transport system in Toronto, the Williams Omnibus Bus Line, was launched. The service began with a fleet of six horse-drawn stagecoaches. After ten years, the use of streetcars were introduced in the city as the Toronto Street Railway (TSR) was established in 1861. After a year of competition between the two companies, the TSR had surpassed Williams Omnibus Line in ridership.

Until 1921, several private and publicly owned transport systems were established and ended up being merged into one another or abandoned. Electric streetcars were widely used in Toronto and surrounding settlements during the new century. After the establishment of the Toronto Transportation Commission (TTC) (predecessor of the Toronto Transit Commission (also having the acronym of TTC) until 1954), streetcar routes were taken over from predecessors in 1921. It ran bus routes by using motor buses for the first time in the city. The TTC also experimented the use of trolley buses from 1922 to 1925, operating a line on Merton Avenue [sic] and Mount Pleasant Road. Gray Coach, an intercity bus line by the TTC, began operation in 1927. As the coach service increased in ridership, the TTC built the Toronto Coach Terminal. By 1933, the TTC introduced the local bus and streetcar stop design, a white pole with a red band on the top and bottom. Between 1930 and 1948, the city replaced various TTC-operated radial railway routes extending to surrounding municipalities with bus routes.

On 1 January 1954, the TTC became the sole public transit operator in the newly formed Metropolitan Toronto. Thus, the TTC took over some private bus operations that existed within the Metro area. These included:

- Hollinger Bus Lines (1921–1954), operating in East York and Scarborough
- Danforth Bus Lines (1920–1954), operating in Scarborough and North York, with interurban services to Claremont in Pickering and King City in King Township
- Roseland Bus Lines (1925–1954), operating in York Township, Etobicoke, Weston, and Woodbridge in Vaughan
- West York Bus Lines (1932–1954), operating in the west and northwest suburbs, including Malton in the then-Toronto Gore Township that later become a part of Mississauga

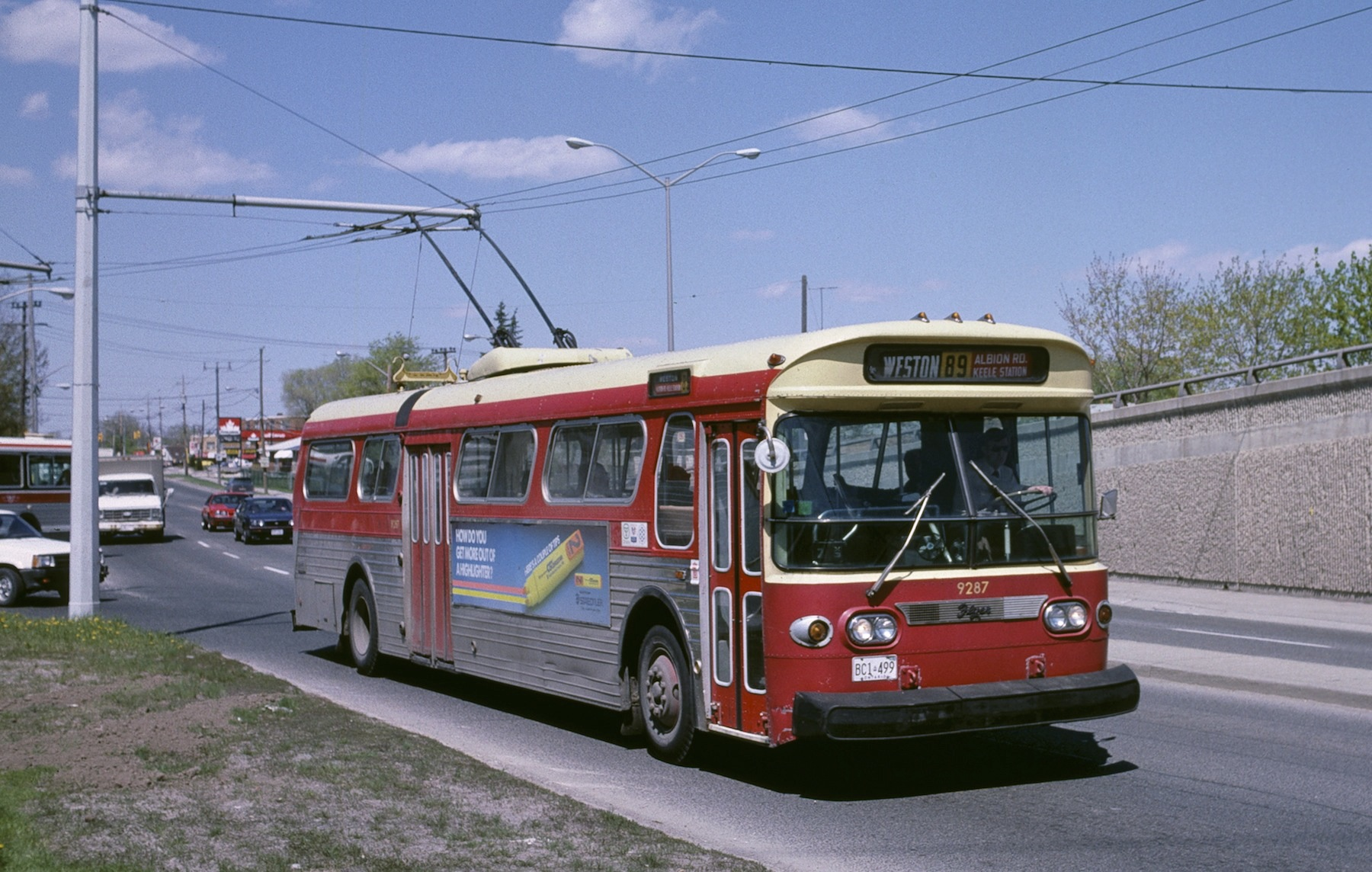
From 1947 to 1993, the TTC's system included several trolley bus routes, including the 89 Weston Road, shown with a trolley bus in 1987.

Between 1947 and 1993, the TTC operated a trolley bus system on medium ridership routes. In 1947, the TTC created four trolley bus routes (Lansdowne, Ossington, Annette, and Weston Road) in the west end that replaced streetcar routes. These routes were based at the Lansdowne garage. About 1954, a separate trolley bus division was created at the old Eglinton garage (adjacent to Eglinton station) to serve routes on Yonge Street, Avenue Road and Mount Pleasant Road north of Eglinton Avenue. When the Yonge–University subway was extended to York Mills station, the Yonge trolley bus line was closed and its buses were reassigned to serve Bay Street. In the early 1970s, the trolley bus fleet was rebuilt. The TTC leased some trolley buses from Edmonton, which was phasing out its fleet. The last trolley buses ran in 1993 on the Bay and Annette routes. Rather than replacing the aging trolley bus infrastructure, the TTC decided to use CNG buses to replace the trolley bus fleet.

In January 1960, the General Motors "New Look" buses, informally called "fishbowls", went into service. As earlier New Looks were retired they in turn would be replaced by newer versions of the New look model, with the result that the model would serve Toronto for over 50 years.

In 1966, plans were made to replace all streetcar routes with buses in the next 20 years. The plan was cancelled in 1972 and streetcar routes were rebuilt. In 1967, GO Transit was established by the Government of Ontario with Gray Coach serving as its operator for most of its routes. The TTC operated its first dial-a-bus services under GO Transit in 1973. In 1975, the first paratransit service, Wheel-Trans, was established by a private operator. The TTC also began using minibuses for minor routes, which would be replaced by regular buses by 1981.

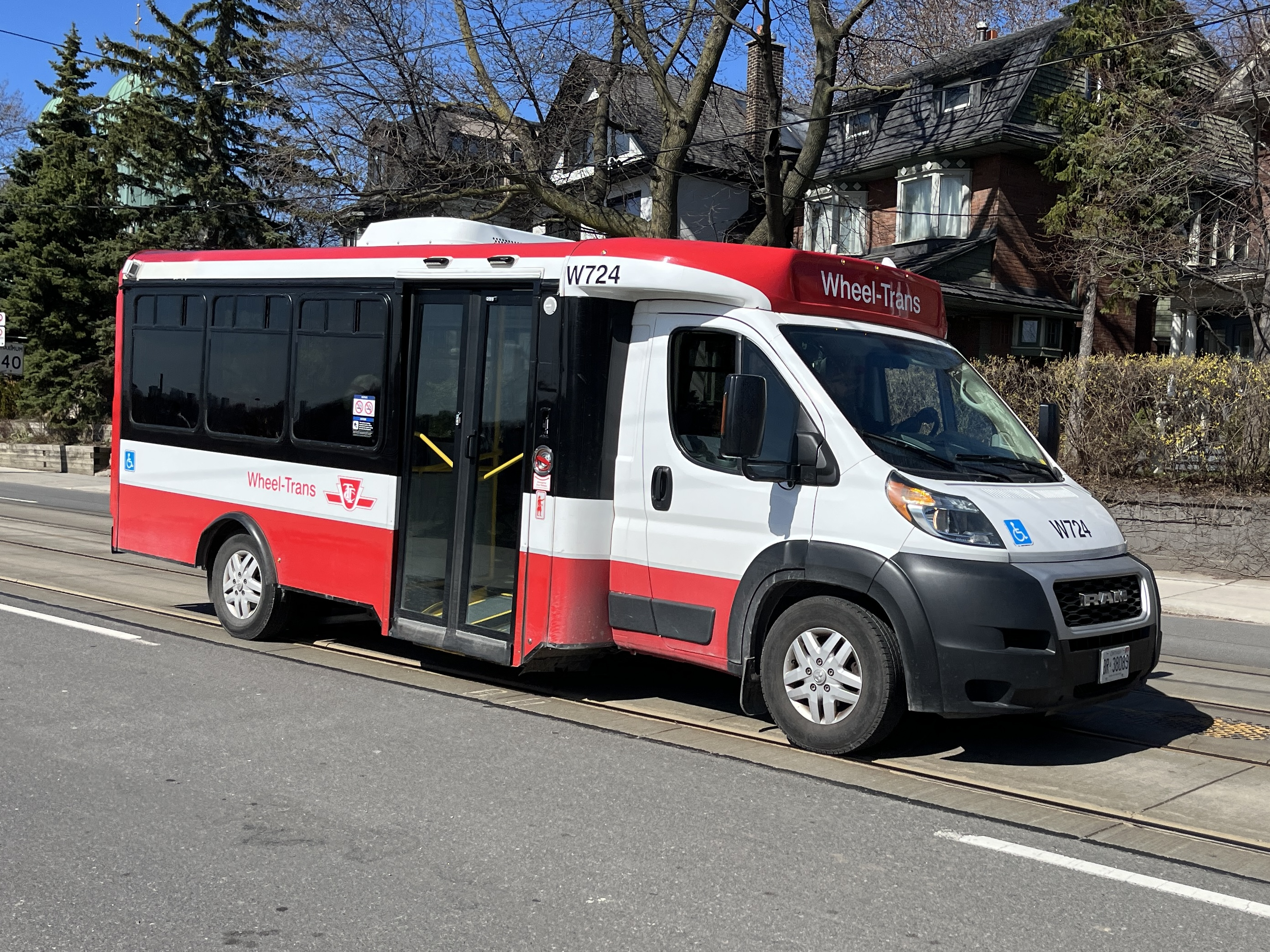
A Wheel-Trans Ram ProMaster CS-2 minibus in 2026. The paratransit service has been operated by the TTC since 1988.

In 1982, the TTC acquired 12 articulated buses, the articulated version of the GM New Look bus. The Province of Ontario sponsored the buses as a trial. The bus had rear-wheel drive whereby the trailer section pushes the rest of the bus. The TTC sold all 12 of these buses to Mississauga in 1987, and chose the Orion Ikarus articulated bus.

In 1987, the TTC acquired 90 Orion Ikarus articulated buses; Ikarus manufactured the components in Budapest, Hungary and Orion Bus Industries assembled them in its Mississauga plant. The buses had mid-section wheel drive whereby the front section of the bus pulled the trailer section. Poor welding led to corrosion problems, and the TTC retired 50 of the buses by 1999, while others were sold to OC Transpo in Ottawa. The last Orion Ikarus bus ran in June 2003.

In 1987, the TTC implemented the Blue Night Network, an expansion of its overnight services using buses and streetcars. The following year, the TTC took over Wheel-Trans services. The TTC sold Gray Coach Lines to the Scotland-based Stagecoach Group in 1990, while also introducing "community buses", providing minibus service in a few residential neighbourhoods.

In 1989, the TTC began using buses fuelled by compressed natural gas (CNG). Supported by subsidies from senior governments, the TTC used CNG buses to replace its trolley bus fleet. CNG buses were serviced at the Wilson Yard which had a special CNG fueling station. Because of safety concerns about CNG fuel tanks on the bus roof and low overhead clearances, these buses were banned from interior terminals. Also, the savings of using natural gas over diesel fuel was not as great as expected. The TTC converted some CNG buses to diesel.

Accessibility expanded to regular buses in 1996 with the use of lift-equipped buses. This was further improvised two years later when low-floor buses were added to the fleet.

=== 21st century ===
Between 2006 and 2009, the TTC made its first purchases of hybrid electric buses, choosing the Orion VII model. These buses had batteries that would only last 18 months instead of the expected 5 years. As a result, the TTC went back to purchasing diesel buses until 2018, when it would try hybrid technology again.

In 2009, the TTC opened its first bus rapid transit (BRT) route that uses its own dedicated busway and bus lanes when route 196 York University Rocket was rerouted to the York University busway. The extension of Line 1 to Vaughan Metropolitan Centre opened in December 2017 caused the TTC to discontinue service on the 196, and since 2022, the 939B Finch Express is the only route that continues to use it.

In December 2011, the TTC bus fleet became fully accessible with the retirement of the last of the old, non-accessible GM "New Look" buses, a model dating back to the 1950s. The last New look buses ran on 52 Lawrence West on 16 December, and were replaced by accessible Orion VII low-floor buses. At that time, the TTC operated 1,800 12-metre (40 ft) accessible buses, all of which were equipped with bike racks.

The TTC ordered 27 articulated buses from Nova Bus, which began revenue operation in the spring of 2014. At 18 metres (60 ft) long, as compared to a standard 12-metre (40 ft) bus, the Nova LFS articulated vehicles hold about 112 passengers, compared to 65 on the standard-length bus.

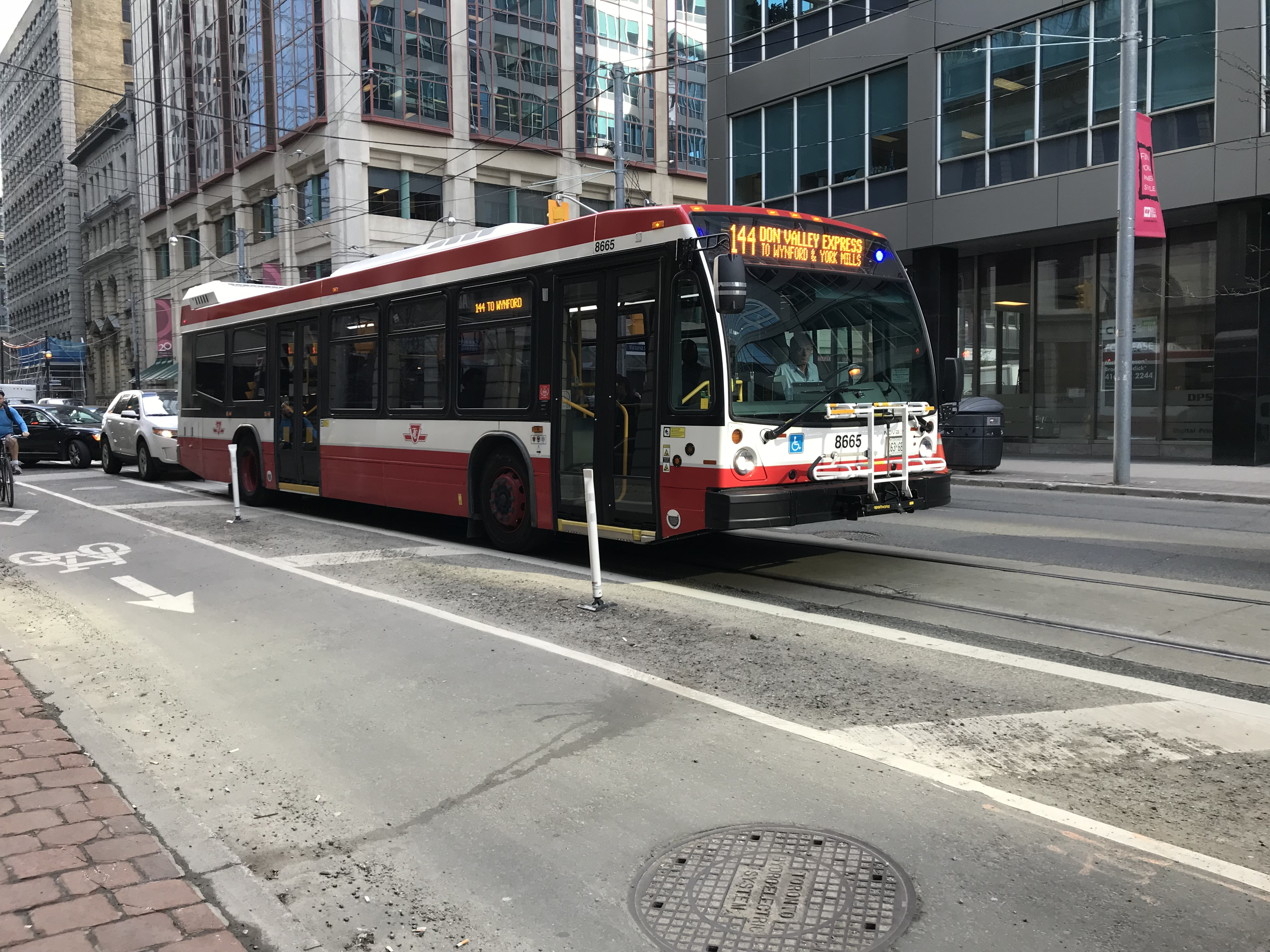
A TTC bus painted in livery based on the Flexity Outlook streetcars used by the TTC in 2018. The livery was introduced on TTC buses the previous year.

As of 23 December 2016, all of the buses in the TTC system have Presto card readers. Buses delivered to the TTC since 2017 have a new livery based on the livery of the Flexity Outlook streetcars.

In November 2018, the TTC received the first 55 of 255 hybrid electric buses, specifically the LFS Hybrid model from Nova Bus.

In April 2019, the TTC received the first of 60 electric buses from the three bus manufacturers: Proterra, New Flyer, and BYD. On 3 June 2019, the first electric bus (from New Flyer) went into revenue service on the 35 Jane bus route. On 26 October 2019, Proterra Catalyst BE40 electric buses went into service on the 6 Bay bus route. By September 2020, the BYD K9M buses had arrived, and on 8 September, the first BYD bus went into service on the 116 Morningside route. At that point in time, with 60 electric buses, the TTC indicated it had the largest fleet of electric buses in North America.

In 2020, effects of the COVID-19 pandemic caused TTC ridership to decrease dramatically. On 23 March 2020, the TTC suspended all express bus services system-wide, with the exception of the 900 Airport Express and 927 Highway 27 Express. A number of seats began to be blocked off to encourage social distancing.

On 31 May 2021, the TTC started a pilot for free Wi-Fi on buses, starting with the 35 Jane route and to continue later in June with the 102 Markham Road route.

In late October 2021, the West Rouge automated shuttle trial was scheduled to start using an autonomous vehicle. The route was to have run from Rouge Hill GO Station to West Rouge Community Centre. The battery-powered vehicle had a capacity for eight passengers and operated at a maximum speed of 20 kilometres per hour (12 mph) in autonomous mode or 40 kilometres per hour (25 mph) in manual mode. During the trial, the vehicle would operate with an attendant. The project was jointly sponsored by the City of Toronto, Metrolinx and the TTC. However, the project was suspended after an accident involving the Whitby Autonomous Vehicle Electric shuttle operated by Durham Region Transit, which used the same type of vehicle. The project was cancelled after the vehicle supplier became defunct in mid-January 2022.

Effective 7 May 2023, the TTC rebranded seasonal routes in the 200-series. Bus stop signs for seasonal routes show a white-and-pink route lozenge and a new seasonal service icon.

During the winter cold in the fourth quarter of 2023 and first quarter of 2024, up to five TTC buses were parked at the main entrance of Spadina station to act as a makeshift homeless shelter to address a shortage of shelter space in the city. The buses are staffed by TTC operators and city staff. Portable washrooms are provided nearby. By the end of January 2024, there were already 1,000 overnight stays on the buses; up to 39 people used the buses each night.

In September 2024, the TTC received the first two of 340 battery-electric buses ordered from New Flyer Industries Canada and Nova Bus. The TTC expects the last of the ordered buses to be delivered in 2026, resulting in a total fleet of 400 electric buses (including 60 earlier deliveries), which would make up 20 percent of the TTC's bus fleet. The TTC expects to have an all-electric fleet by 2040.

== Operations ==
=== Routes ===
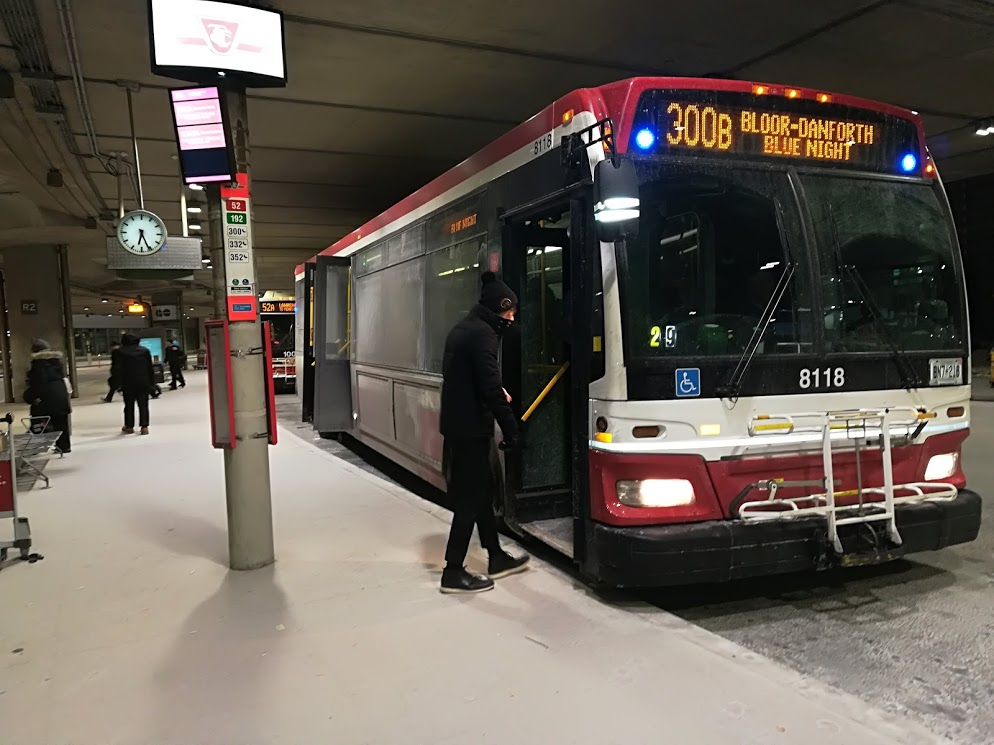
A TTC bus operating on TTC Route 300B. Blue Night routes are numbered from 300 to 396.

The TTC operates six types of bus routes:

- Regular service routes operate from 6 am (8 am on Sundays) to 1 am the next calendar day, 7 days per week.
- 10 minute network, routes run every 10 minutes or better in all time periods from 6 AM to 1 AM the following day (8 AM to 1 AM on Sundays), 7 days a week
- Limited service routes do not serve all hours of the day, or not all days of the week. Regular, ten minute and limited service routes are collectively numbered between 7 and 191.
- Seasonal routes operating mainly in the warmer months serving attractions such as Toronto Zoo, Bluffer's Park, and Cherry Beach (200-series routes)
- Blue Night routes that operate only at night (300-series routes)
- Community routes using minibuses connecting hubs within a community (400-series routes)
- Express routes that serve only major bus stops (900-series routes)

The TTC also offers its Wheel-Trans service for registered users with disabilities. This service operates door-to-door and requires booking in advance. Wheel-Trans uses minibuses and has no predefined routes.

Routes with regular service operate all day, every day from approximately 6 am (8 am Sundays) to 1 am the next calendar day. Routes with limited service are similar but do not operate during all periods of the day or not on all days of the week. Limited service varies by route.

Express bus service serves only select stops. The frequency of express service varies by route, and service on some routes does not operate during all periods of the day or all days of the week.

Blue Night Network routes operate from approximately 1:30 am until 6 am (8 am on Sundays) and have 30-minute or better service.

Community bus routes operate midday, Monday to Friday, connecting seniors' residences within a community with nearby hubs such as plazas, medical buildings and community centres. Community bus service uses the same mini-bus fleet as WheelTrans but has fixed routes and requires no booking. Customers flag down buses anywhere along the route.

Many regular bus routes are divided into branch routes, which deviate slightly from the original route or which terminate at different points along the route. A route can be referred to by its route number or name (for example, 191 Underhill). Routes are named after the street or area served. All of the TTC's regular routes connect to a Toronto subway station or the Scarborough Centre station bus terminal; 99 Arrow Road and 171 Mount Dennis serve the areas around their respective bus garages, while the 200 Toronto Zoo runs between the zoo and Rouge Hill GO Station. Vaughan Metropolitan Centre, Highway 407, and Chester stations do not have any connections to regular daytime TTC bus routes.

Some bus routes extend beyond the city limits into Mississauga (west of Pearson International Airport) and York Region (north of Steeles Avenue), as those municipalities contract out bus routes to the TTC outside of Toronto. In the past, an extra fare – equal to the cost of the MiWay or York Region Transit fare respectively – was required for all customers using the service operating in those areas in addition to the regular TTC fare. With the introduction on 26 February 2024, of the Ontario One Fare Program, a GTHA-wide fare integration program, customers paying by Presto, credit or debit card only need to pay once to cross city limits when travelling on a TTC bus. Despite being almost completely in Mississauga, Pearson International Airport is within the TTC's fare-paid zone.

=== Priority bus lanes ===
In 2020, as part of a municipal initiative dubbed RapidTO, the TTC started to set up priority bus lanes along several routes in Toronto. These are different from existing High Occupancy Vehicle (HOV) lanes in that they are in effect 24 hours per day seven days per week, and may only be used by buses and bicycles, with taxis and private vehicles not being allowed. The priority bus lanes are identified by paint and signage.

The COVID-19 pandemic provided the impetus for the RapidTO project. The lanes are to improve TTC service in lower-income neighbourhoods, which house employees performing essential services during the pandemic. By allowing buses to move faster, there would be less crowding and better physical distancing.

The lanes prevent road traffic from slowing bus service and disrupting the spacing between buses, which had resulted in gaps and bunching. The lanes are expected to improve efficiency so that fewer buses are required to produce the same level of service, with the extra buses being deployed to provide additional bus service.

Bus priority lanes are painted in red with diamond and "bus only" markings, as well as cyclist markings. Private vehicles may use some portions of the lanes, where the lanes have broken lines, to access driveways or to make right turns. There are no physical barriers to separate bus from general traffic lanes. Motorists illegally using a bus priority lane are subject to a $110 fine and three demerit points.

The priority routes are:

- Eglinton Avenue East, from Midland Avenue to Cedar Drive, Kingston Road from Eglinton Avenue East to Morningside Avenue, and Morningside Avenue from Kingston Road to Ellesmere Road to the University of Toronto Scarborough
- Jane Street from Eglinton Avenue to Steeles Avenue
- Dufferin Street from Dufferin Gates to Wilson Avenue (original plan); from King Street West to Dufferin station (in effect)
- Bathurst Street from Fleet Street to Bathurst Station (streetcar tracks restricted from vehicle traffic)
- Steeles Avenue West from Yonge Street to Pioneer Village station
- Finch Avenue East from Yonge Street to McCowan Road
- Lawrence East from east of Victoria Park Avenue to Rouge Hill Drive near Rouge Hill GO Station

The TTC opened the Eglinton East lanes on 11 October 2020 (with the lanes on Morningside Avenue opening a few days earlier) and had expected to implement the Jane lanes in the second quarter of 2021. However, concerns about the effect of the lanes on traffic delayed further RapidTO implementation. Assuming approval by city council in February 2024, bus lanes could be implemented on Jane Street by the end of 2024. The implementation dates for bus lanes on other streets are not yet known.

==== Eglinton East ====
The Eglinton East route runs 10.9 kilometres (6.8 mi) from Midland Avenue to the University of Toronto Scarborough campus along Eglinton Avenue East, Kingston Road and Morningside Avenue. The TTC converted the existing HOV lanes on Eglinton Avenue East and the curbside general-purpose lanes on Kingston Road and Morningside Avenue to priority bus-only lanes. Priority lanes will not be implemented between Kennedy station and Brimley Road until construction for the Scarborough subway extension is completed. Both local and express bus routes use the priority lanes, and the number of bus stops were reduced to speed up service. The implementation of priority bus lanes will not preclude a future upgrade to light rail. The Eglinton East lanes were expected to cost nearly $8 million.

When implementing the corridor, the TTC reduced the number of stops along the way from 69 to 48, a net reduction of 21 stops, and was reviewing the "consolidation" of six additional stops. Some of the eliminated stops were far from a signalized intersection; some others had few nearby destinations. Having fewer stops allowed faster bus service but, for many riders, resulted in longer walk times to a bus stop. For example, when the stop near two apartment buildings at Dale Avenue and Kingston Road was eliminated, riders had to walk an extra 250 metres (820 ft). Another eliminated stop was 900 metres (3,000 ft) from its nearest replacement stop; this contradicts a TTC guideline that stops should be no more than 400 metres (1,300 ft) apart. Riders, including those with disabilities, complained.

A 2021 city study reported that routes passing through the Eglinton East RapidTO lanes had a 10-percent increase in on-time reliability and up to a 5-minute decrease in rush-hour trip time.

Five routes use the Eglinton East priority bus lanes:

- 12D Kingston Rd
- 86 Scarborough
- 116 Morningside
- 905 Eglinton East Express
- 986 Scarborough Express

If the planned Eglinton East LRT enters revenue service, then Rapid TO bus lanes overlapping the LRT alignment would be removed.

==== Dufferin ====
In 2020, the Dufferin Street RapidTO lanes were planned to run from Dufferin Gates to Wilson Avenue. By 2025, the project had been downsized to run between Dufferin Station and King Street West. The city started to paint these lanes red on 16 November 2025 to prepare for the 2026 FIFA World Cup. All on-street parking was removed, but loading zones were provided during certain time periods. North of Dufferin station, and between Thornburn Avenue and Springhurst Avenue, a portion of the centre lane was painted red. Restrictions were placed on left turns from Dufferin Street, and traffic signal timing was adjusted.

==== Jane ====
The Jane bus priority lanes will run along Jane Street between Eglinton Avenue and Steeles Avenue. These lanes were expected to open in 2021, but their setup has been delayed to allow for public consultation in 2023.

The Jane route is next in priority for implementation because:

- It had one of the slowest operating speeds in 2020
- It will provide a north–south connection with three subway lines: the existing Line 1 Yonge–University and Line 6 Finch West, along with Line 5 Eglinton's western extension
- It will serve many neighbourhood improvement areas
- There will be no adverse impacts to on-street parking

=== Busways ===
This section describes exclusive bus-only roadways as opposed to priority lanes along mixed-use streets.

==== York University busway ====
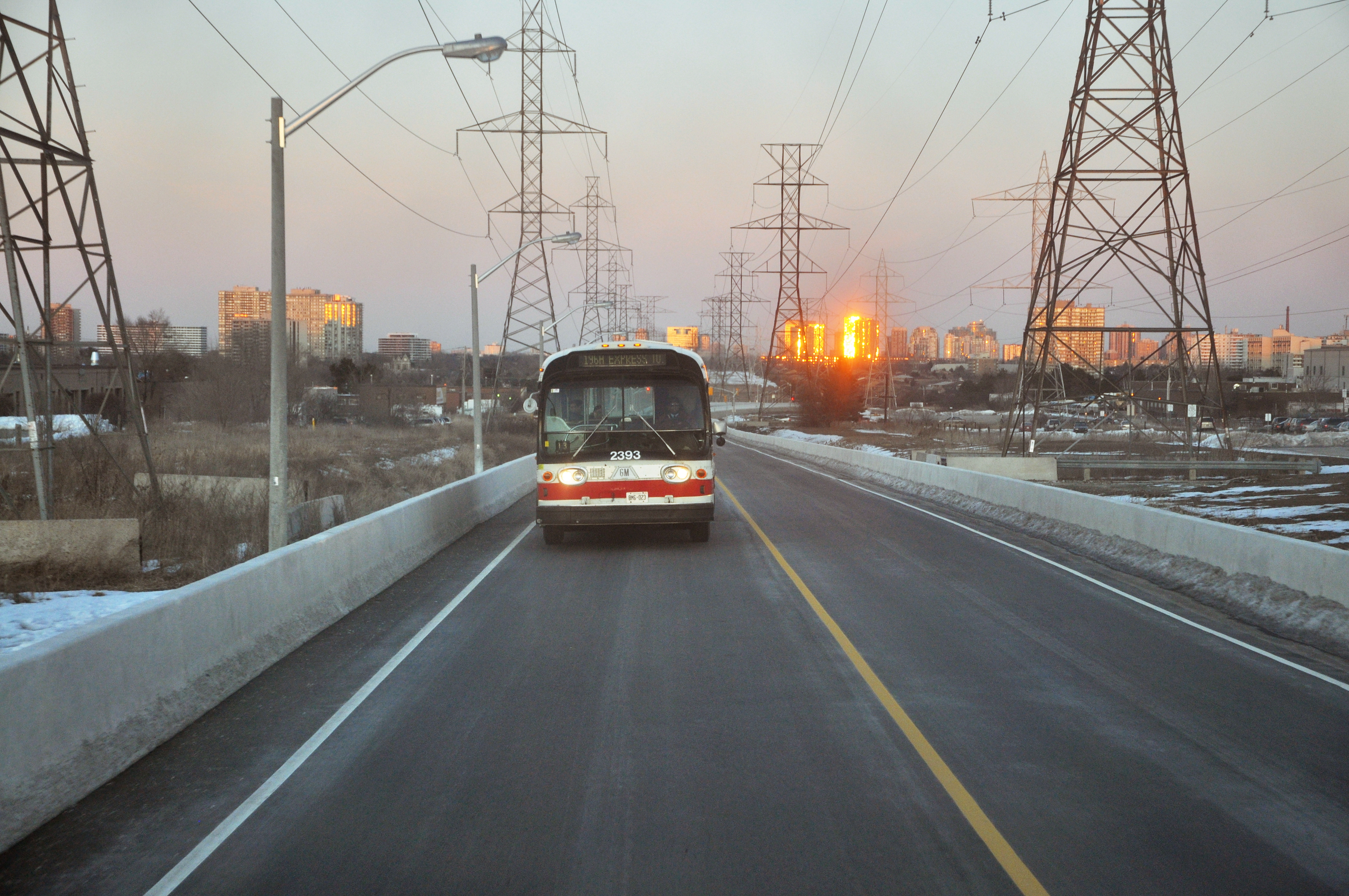
York University busway

The York University busway opened in 2009, running 6 kilometres (3.7 mi) between Dufferin Street and York University Keele Campus. After the opening of the Toronto–York Spadina subway extension in 2017, the busway was shortened to run 1.8 kilometres (1.1 mi) between Finch West station and Dufferin Street; it no longer serves its namesake university. The busway runs along an electric power transmission corridor.

==== Scarborough busway ====
The Scarborough busway (previously referred to as the Line 3 busway) in Toronto, Ontario, Canada, is a bus-only roadway that uses approximately 4 kilometres (2.5 mi) of the former right-of-way of Line 3 Scarborough between Kennedy station and the former Ellesmere station, paralleling GO Transit's Stouffville line. The Toronto Transit Commission operates the busway. The converted right-of-way has stops at Kennedy, Tara Avenue / Mooregate Avenue, Lawrence East and Ellesmere stations. Buses then continue via priority lanes on Ellesmere Road to Scarborough Centre station. Multiple TTC bus routes serve the busway, allowing riders travelling to and from other parts of Scarborough to remain on their buses rather than transfer to a separate replacement service.

Removal of the former Line 3 rails and wayside electrical equipment began in 2024 and was completed by the end of that year. The main construction contract was awarded to Clearway Construction in 2025, and construction began that year. The project was originally expected to be completed in 2027 but was subsequently accelerated. On August 20, 2026, the TTC confirmed that the busway was scheduled to open for revenue service that September 30, more than six months ahead of the revised schedule. The busway opened for service as expected on September 30, 2026.

The busway is intended to provide faster and more reliable service between Kennedy and Scarborough Centre while the Scarborough subway extension is under construction. The TTC expects a trip between Kennedy and Scarborough Centre stations to take approximately 15 minutes after the busway opens, about seven minutes faster than the interim on-street replacement service. Toronto mayor Olivia Chow said the busway was expected to serve more than 118,000 riders per week. The busway is also expected to remain available after completion of the subway extension as additional rapid transit infrastructure in the corridor.

=== Automatic passenger counting ===
Automatic passenger counting (APC) is a feature installed on TTC buses to automatically to keep a count of the passengers on board each bus. The feature uses infrared lights at doors to count passengers boarding and exiting buses. Along with bus location, APC data is transmitted to a central computer in real-time and is used for service planning and transit control, as well as to deter fare evasion by some degree. Using APC data, the TTC can monitor passenger load on buses and optimize bus assignments on routes that have a potential for crowding. As of April 2021, all but 34 of the TTC's more than 2000 buses have APC; none of the streetcars in the commission's fleet have the feature.

APC also supports the Transit iOS/iPadOS and Android app, allowing the feature to advise riders about bus crowding. This feature was introduced in April 2021 during the COVID-19 pandemic to support physical distancing. The TTC says it will continue to support this app after the pandemic ends.

=== Emergencies ===
If there is a power failure affecting either the streetcar or subway system, the TTC will deploy shuttle buses. For this purpose, the TTC states it has adequate buses available for such emergencies.

The TTC relies on City of Toronto crews to clear roads of ice and snow during winter storms. However, the TTC may put certain vulnerable bus stops out of service to avoid buses getting stuck. This occurs for stops being historically problematic during winter storms. The TTC will post signs at such stops about one hour prior to the storm advising riders of the nearest alternative stop. Bus stops have signs with a QR code to direct a smartphone to information on service disruptions and the nearest in-service bus stop. The TTC also contracts with private tow truck operators to recover TTC buses trapped during winter storms.

== Garages ==
The following is a list of active TTC bus garages:

Active garages
Garage	Opened	Address	Description
Arrow Road (Arw)	1988	700 Arrow Rd., North York	21,000 m^{2} (230,000 sq ft) facility; 2 wash racks; 2 diesel fueling stations; 12 twelve-metre and 2 eighteen-metre hoists; 4 inspection pits; electric bus recharging
Birchmount (Bir)	1956	400 Danforth Rd., Scarborough	8,310 m^{2} (89,500 sq ft) facility; 2 wash racks; 2 fueling stations; 10 twelve-metre hoists; 4 inspection pits; UWE heating system for buses stored outside, electric bus recharging
New Eglinton (Egl) (Note: Also referred to Comstock, to distinguish from Old Eginton)	2002	38 Comstock Rd., Scarborough	2 wash racks; 2 fueling stations; 14 twelve-metre hoists; 4 inspection pits; UWE heating system for buses stored outside; electric bus recharging
Lakeshore (W-T)	1980	580 Commissioners St., Toronto	2.8 ha (7 acres) of land; 4,800 m^{2} (52,000 sq ft) of maintenance space; 740 m^{2} (8,000 sq ft) of office space; supporting Wheel-Trans and community buses
Malvern (Mal)	1983	5050 Sheppard Ave. East, Scarborough	21,200 m^{2} (228,000 sq ft) facility; 2 wash racks; 2 fueling stations; 12 twelve-metre hoists; 3 eighteen-metre hoists; 4 inspection pits; indoor bus storage; Eurovac system
McNicoll (McN)	2021	225 Milliken Blvd., Scarborough	29,000 m^{2} (310,000 sq ft) facility, capacity for 250 12-metre buses, repair bays with 14 hoists and 2 inspection pits, paint and body shops with 2 bays and one hoist, degrease room with one hoist, rooftop solar panels for office HVAC and lighting, green roof, electric bus recharging
Mount Dennis (MtD)	2008	121 Industry St., York	23,575 m^{2} (253,759 sq ft) facility; 16 hoists for twelve and eighteen-metre buses, 4 cleaning stations; steam cleaning room; paint and body shops; parts and materials storage area; electric bus recharging
Queensway (Qsy)	1966	400 Evans Ave., Etobicoke	11,600 m^{2} (125,000 sq ft) facility; 1 wash rack; 1 diesel fueling station; 14 twelve-metre hoists
Wilson (Wil)	1976	160 Transit Rd., North York; Wilson Yard Complex	21,368 m^{2} (230,000 sq ft) facility; 11 twelve-metre hoists and 3 eighteen-metre hoists; 2 wash racks, 2 diesel fuelling stations; 4 inspection pits; Eurovac system

For major bus overhauls, the TTC uses the Duncan Shop (W. E. P. Duncan Building) and the D. W. Harvey Shops at the Hillcrest Complex.

As of 2026, seven garages have equipment to recharge electric buses: Arrow Road (for New Flyer and Nova buses), Birchmount (for New Flyers), Eglinton (NovaBus and New Flyer buses), Malvern (New Flyer), McNicoll (New Flyer and NovaBus), Mount Dennis (Proterra, NovaBus and New Flyer buses) and Wilson (NovaBus).

As of August 2020, the TTC has been in negotiation with Toronto Hydro and Ontario Power Generation (OPG) to set up eBus infrastructure at TTC garages. Toronto Hydro would increase electrical capacity at each TTC garage, and OPG would design, build, operate and maintain all charging infrastructure at garages. The TTC hopes to get TTC board approval in the first quarter of 2021.

=== Former garages ===
Former garages
Yard	Location	Year opened	Year closed	Notes
Danforth (Dan)	1627 Danforth Ave., Toronto	1915; 1921–1922 (additions by TTC)	2002	Built for the Toronto Civic Railways in 1915 and additional indoor storage added by TTC in 1921–1922; re-purposed as bus garage in 1967; closed in 2002 but still used by TTC for storage and office space
Davenport (Dav)	793 Davenport Rd., Toronto	1924	1993	Attached to Hillcrest Complex
Eglinton (Egl)	2190 Yonge St., Toronto	1922	2002; demolished	Built to replace TRC Yorkville Carhouse and retired as carhouse in 1948 to become bus garage until 2002; most of facility now demolished and remainder used as temporary bus terminal until opening of Line 5 Eglinton
Lansdowne (Lan)	640 Lansdowne Ave., Toronto	1911	1996; demolished 2003	Built for the Toronto Railway Company and acquired by TTC in 1921; became a trolley bus garage in 1947 and streetcar storage ended 1967; abandoned after 1996 and demolished 2003. Site a vacant and fenced-off lot.

== Vehicles ==
=== Fleet ===
Bus fleet as per TTC Service Summary of October 2026
Series	Model	In service	Garage	Built	Seats	Length (m)	Propulsion	Manufacturer
1200–1423	Orion VII 07.501 "Next Gen"	13 (Note: Retirements in progress)	Mal, MtD	2007 (1200-1399) 2008 (1400-1423)	36	12	Diesel-electric	Daimler Buses North America
1500–1689	Orion VII 07.501 "Next Gen"	30	Mal	2008	33	12	Diesel-electric	Daimler Buses North America
3100–3369	LFS	270	Arw, McN, Qsy	2018	33	12	Diesel	NovaBus
3400–3654	LFS Hybrid	255	Arw, Mal, Wil	2018 (3400-3474) 2019 (3475-3654)	33	12	Diesel-electric	NovaBus
3700–3724	Xcelsior XE40	6 (19 in Storage at North Queen/TOK Performance in Vaughan)	Arw	2019–2020	33	12	Battery-electric	New Flyer Industries
6000–6203	Xcelsior XE40	204	Arw, Bir, Mal, McN, MtD	2024 (6000-6096) 2025 (6097-6203)	33	12	Battery-electric	New Flyer Industries
6600–6735	LFSe+	136	Egl, McN, Wil	2024 (6600-6601) 2025 (6602-6735)	33	12	Battery-electric	NovaBus
7000–7133	LFS Hybrid	132	Wil	2023–2024	33	12	Diesel-electric	NovaBus
7200–7333	Xcelsior XDE40	134	MtD	2023–2024	33	12	Diesel-electric	New Flyer Industries
8100–8219	Orion VII 07.501 "Next Gen”	55	Qsy	2010	36	12	Diesel	Daimler Buses North America
8300–8396	Orion VII	92	Qsy, Wil	2011–2012	36	12	Diesel	Daimler Buses North America
8400–8504	LFS	105	Bir	2015	33	12	Diesel	NovaBus
8510-8617	LFS	107	Bir	2016	33	12	Diesel	NovaBus
8620–8716	LFS	97	Egl, Mal, McN	2017	33	12	Diesel	NovaBus
8720-8964	LFS	245	Arw, Bir, Egl, Mal, McN	2017	33	12	Diesel	NovaBus
9000–9026	LFS Artic	12	Wil	2013	46	18	Diesel	Nova Bus
9027-9152	LFS Artic	116	Arw, Mal, McN, Wil	2014	46	18	Diesel	NovaBus
9200–9239	LFS	40	McN	2018	33	12	Diesel	Nova Bus
9400–9467	Xcelsior XDE60	68	McN, MtD	2023–2024	50	18	Diesel-electric	New Flyer Industries
W500–W671 & W300–W351	Promaster	226 (Note: Deliveries in progress)	W-T	2017–2025	6	6	Gasoline	Creative Carriage Ltd.
W700–W837	Promaster Plus	138	W-T	2019–2023	7	7	Gasoline	ARBOC/Creative Carriage Ltd.

=== Diesel low-floor buses ===
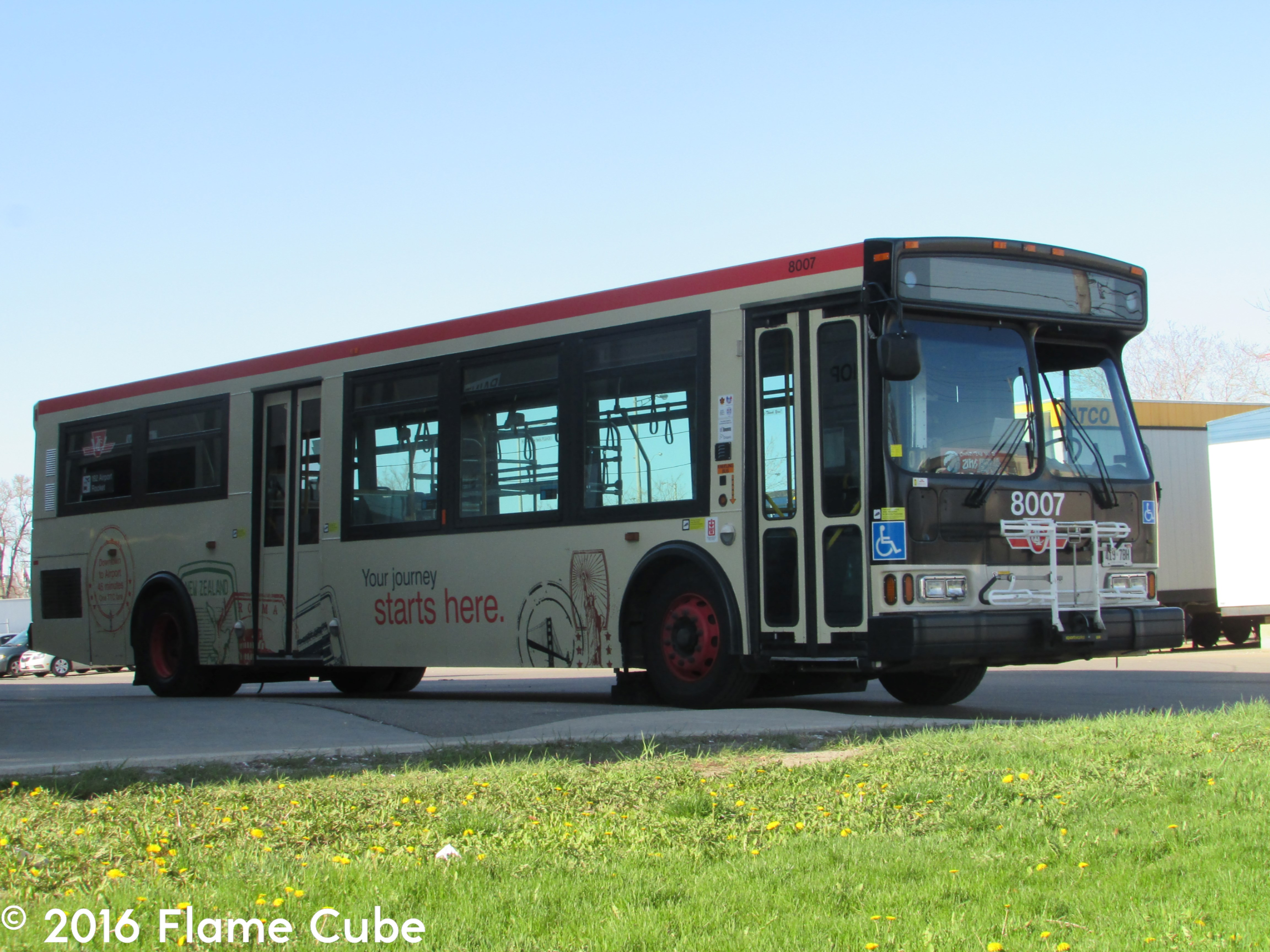
An Orion VII bus in an airport-themed livery for the 900 Airport Express bus route to Toronto Pearson International Airport from Kipling station taken in 2016

The TTC has a fleet of Orion VII low-floor buses built from 2006 to 2012 and retired between 2019 and 2023, and the Nova LFS, built from 2015 to 2018.

The first order of 51 diesel low-floor diesel buses, of the D40LF model, were manufactured by New Flyer in 1999 and retired in 2016. 220 Orion VIIs, manufactured by Orion Bus Industries, were added to the roster in 2003 and 2004, with another 250 acquired in 2005. Between 2012 and 2014, the fleet was rebuilt; it took approximately eight days to complete a rebuild and cost about $175,000. Further deliveries were added between 2006 and 2007 with 180 buses acquired with the UWE heating system removed, and an additional 217 buses between 2010 and 2012 were delivered as diesel buses instead of hybrids. 12 buses from the 2007 Orion order were retrofitted with luggage racks at a cost of $2,000 per bus, which replaced some of the single seats, had new airport-themed livery installed, and are dedicated to the 900 Airport Express service to Toronto Pearson International Airport from Kipling station.

After the success of the articulated buses, the TTC purchased over 213 12-metre (40 ft) LFS diesel buses between 2015 and 2016. An additional 382 buses were added to the order in 2017 and 2018 to replace the retiring Orion VII buses manufactured between 2002 and 2005 due to emissions problems, while another 270 were added in 2018 and came equipped with external security cameras and USB-A ports where customers could charge their mobile devices on the bus.

=== Articulated buses ===
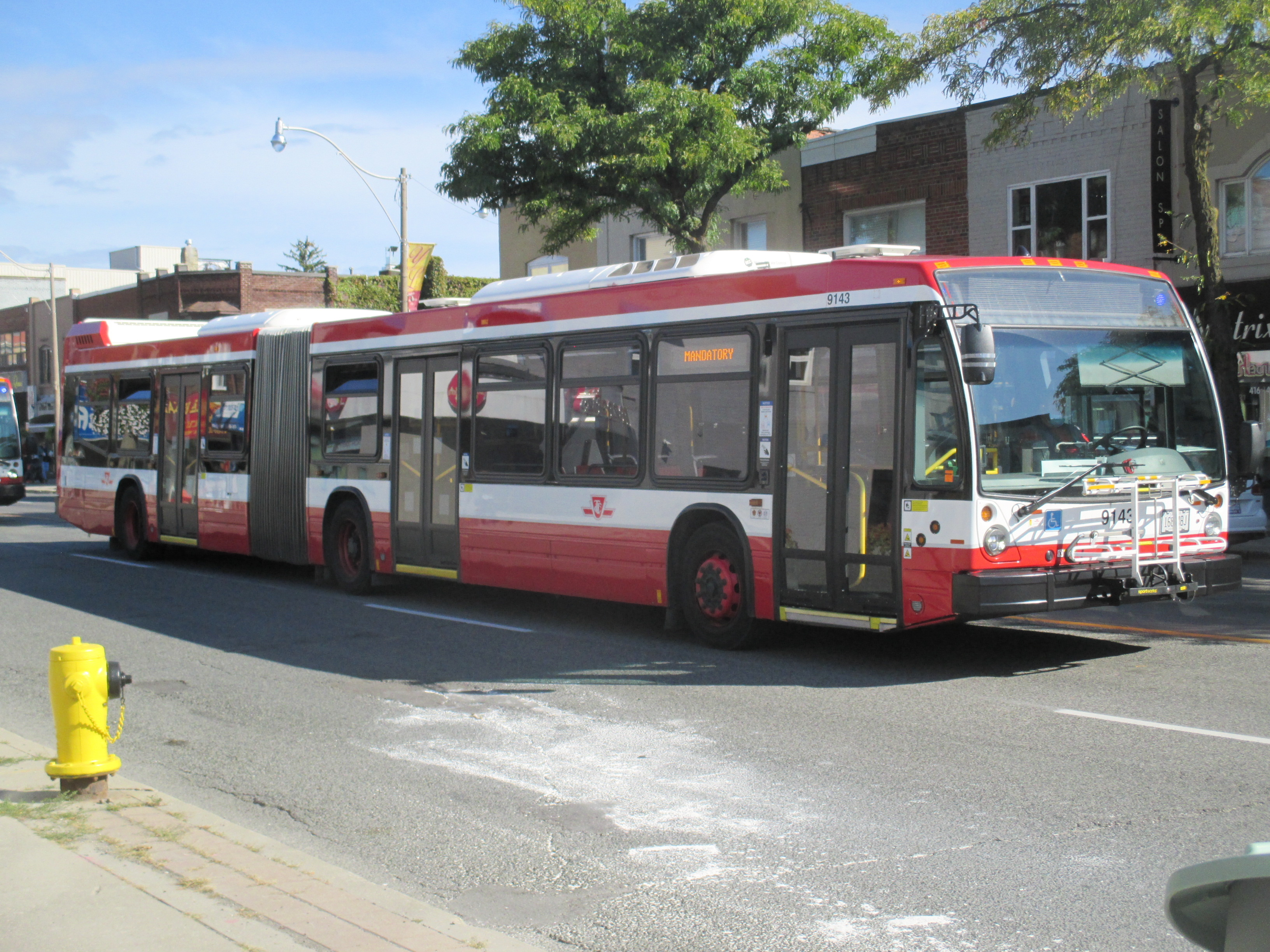
Nova LFS diesel articulated bus

Introduced in 2013, the Nova Bus articulated buses are the third generation of articulated buses in Toronto, the earlier two being those manufactured by General Motors (operating from 1982 to 1987) and by Orion-Ikarus (operating from 1987 to 2003). The total cost of the Nova articulated fleet was $143.7 million. Fewer operators are required as the 18-metre articulated bus (carrying 46 seated and approximately 31 standing passengers) has 45 percent more passenger capacity than a 12-metre bus. Each bus can accommodate two standard wheelchairs and provides nine priority passenger seats. Each bus features three doors, LED interior and exterior lighting and automatic central air conditioning and heating. The "clean diesel" engines minimize engine exhaust emissions using electronic engine controls and treatment systems for diesel exhaust.

In late April 2017, the TTC temporarily withdrew the entire Nova articulated fleet from service because one of the buses experienced a "full throttle", that is, an unexpected acceleration. Nova provided a software fix that required 20 minutes per bus to install allowing buses to go back into service.

The fourth generation of articulated buses, which is hybrid-electric was built by New Flyer Industries.

=== Hybrid-electric buses ===
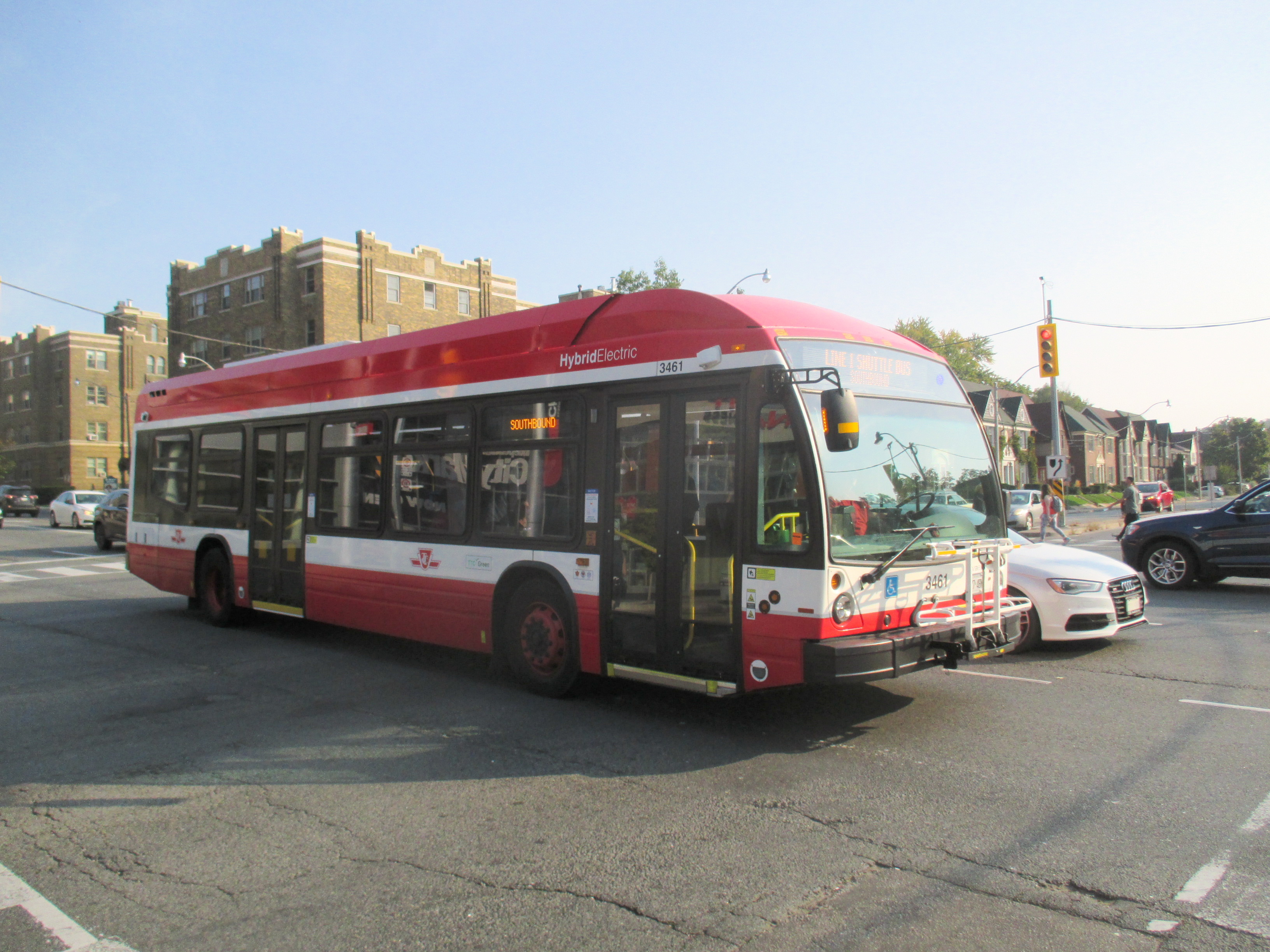
Nova LFS hybrid bus

The TTC has three models of hybrid-electric buses (also called diesel-electric buses), Orion VII built from 2006 to 2009, the LFS Hybrid built in 2018–2019 and 2023, and the New Flyer XDE40 built in 2023.

The Orion VII hybrid buses, like its diesel counterparts, have features such as air-conditioning, GPS for automatic stop announcements, a wheelchair ramp and the ability to kneel at the front door for easier boarding. Fuel savings of 10 to 30 percent were expected compared to diesel buses. However, the model achieved only 10 percent savings because it was designed to work best in stop-and-go traffic that occurs mainly in downtown Toronto. The batteries were problematic requiring replacement every 18 months when they were expected to last five years. At $700,000 per bus, the hybrid was $200,000 more expensive than a diesel-only bus.

The LFS Hybrid is essentially an electric bus with an onboard diesel generator to produce electricity to recharge an onboard battery as needed. Unlike for electric buses, the battery is not recharged overnight. These diesel-electric buses use 25 percent less fuel than a diesel bus. Also, energy produced by descending a hill or braking will help recharge the battery through regenerative braking. The bus is driven by an electric motor with electricity drawn from the on-board battery. On-board systems such as doors, HVAC, power steering, etc. are electrically powered.

In February 2022, the TTC ordered 336 hybrid-electric buses that were delivered in 2023 and 2024. By 2024, the bus fleet was to consist entirely of low- and zero-emission buses. The hybrid-electric buses ordered in 2022 were to be the last hybrid-electric buses that the TTC purchased. Subsequent bus purchases were to consist of zero-emission vehicles only. The 2022 order included:

- Nova Bus: 134 twelve-metre (40 ft) hybrid-electric buses
- New Flyer Industries: 134 twelve-metre (40 ft) hybrid-electric buses
- New Flyer Industries: 68 eighteen-metre (60 ft) articulated hybrid-electric buses

In 2027, the TTC will take delivery of 200 more hybrid buses, made possible through the Canadian Public Transit Fund. The manufacturer is still to be determined.

=== Electric buses ===
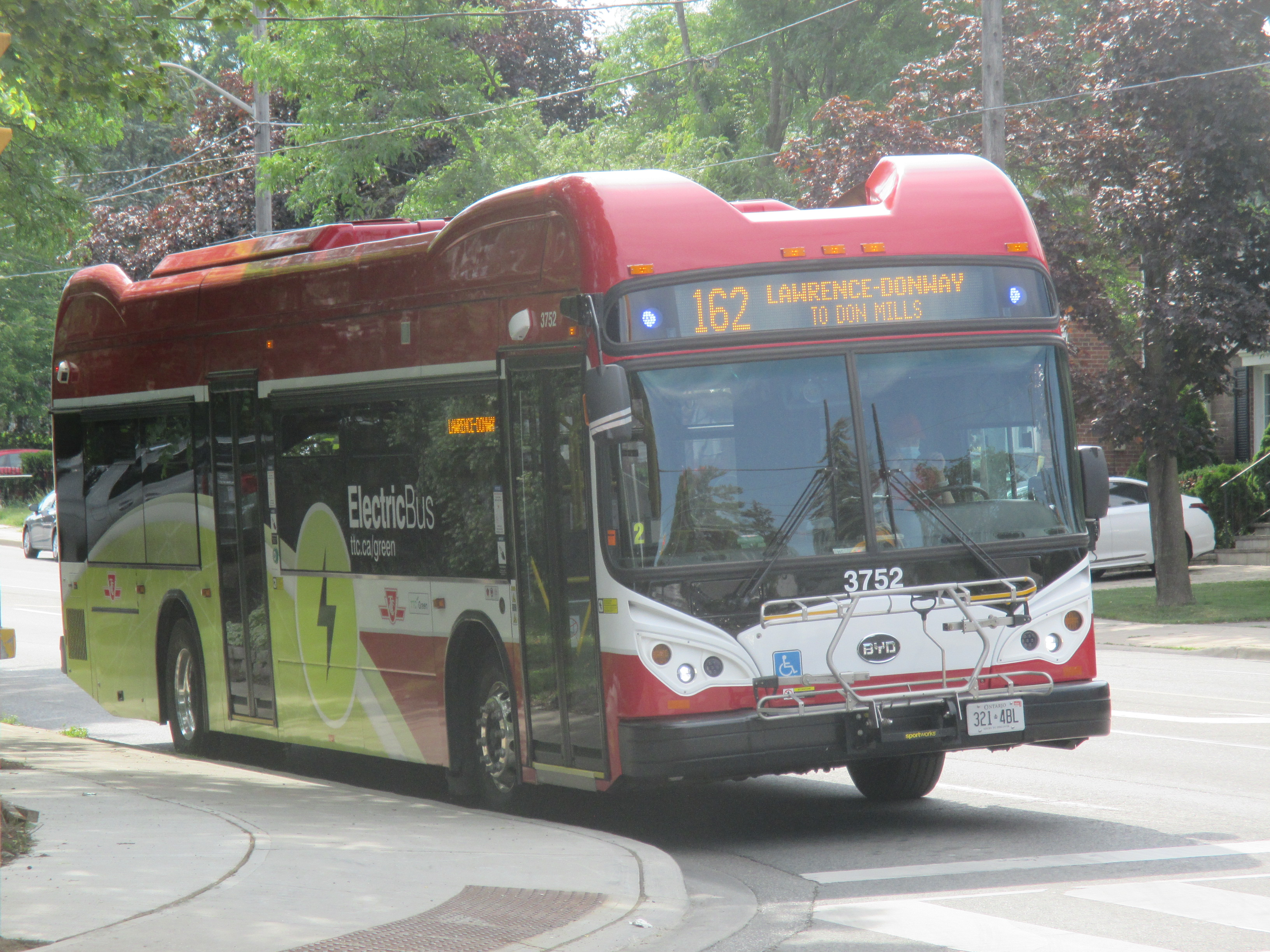
BYD K9M eBus

The TTC has a goal to operate an emissions-free bus fleet by 2040. In 2018, the TTC received three demonstrator electric buses for evaluation to test the performance of electric vehicles. The TTC received one bus each from manufacturers: California-based Proterra, Winnipeg-based New Flyer (part of NFI Group) and China-based BYD.

In April 2019, the TTC received the first of 60 electric buses after ordering 25 each from Proterra and New Flyer, and 10 from BYD. The 60 buses, plus infrastructure changes at three TTC garages, had cost approximately $140 million with the federal government paying $65 million of that cost.

The buses are powered exclusively by lithium-ion batteries that take about three hours to recharge. The buses are expected to travel approximately 200 kilometres (120 mi) on a single charge; however, when the bus heater activates in cold weather, the range is reduced by 30 to 50 percent. (For perspective, an electric bus on the 35 Jane route travels about 78 kilometres (48 mi) in a day.) Per year, each electric bus will reduce carbon dioxide emissions by 149.2 metric tons (146.8 long tons; 164.5 short tons) and eliminate diesel fuel costs of $56,000. The electric buses are 15 to 20 percent quieter in motion, and 85 percent quieter when idling. These buses, with a 440,000-watt onboard battery, can be used as mobile power plants during power outages, by plugging the bus into a building such as a hospital.

BYD buses require different recharging infrastructure than Proterra and New Flyer buses, with the former using AC (alternating current) and the latter two using DC (direct current). The Eglinton garage has AC recharging, while Arrow Road, Birchmount and Mount Dennis garages have DC.

In April 2023, the TTC had a new overhead charging system installed at its Birchmount garage to charge electric buses. The charging system has 10 pantographs, each descending from a gantry to contact receptors on the roof of an electric bus. The new system was more efficient and took less space than the previous plug-in charging system. PowerON Energy Solutions, an Ontario Power Generation subsidiary, supplied the new charging system.

In late April 2023, the federal government and the city announced they would jointly provide $700 million to fund the electrification of the TTC's bus fleet. The federal government would contribute $349 million and the city would provide the remaining $351 million. With this funding, the TTC would purchase 340 zero-emission buses and 248 bus chargers, and upgrade garage infrastructure at eight garages. The TTC planned to buy zero-emission buses exclusively by 2025 and to have the entire fleet converted to zero-emission vehicles by 2040.

In 2027, the TTC received funding from the Canadian Public Transit Fund to purchase 50 more electric buses, specifically the Nova LFSe+.

== Amenities ==
=== USB ports ===
Since 2018, some of the newer TTC buses are equipped with 12 pairs of USB-A ports throughout the bus for passengers to charge their mobile devices.

=== Bicycle racks ===
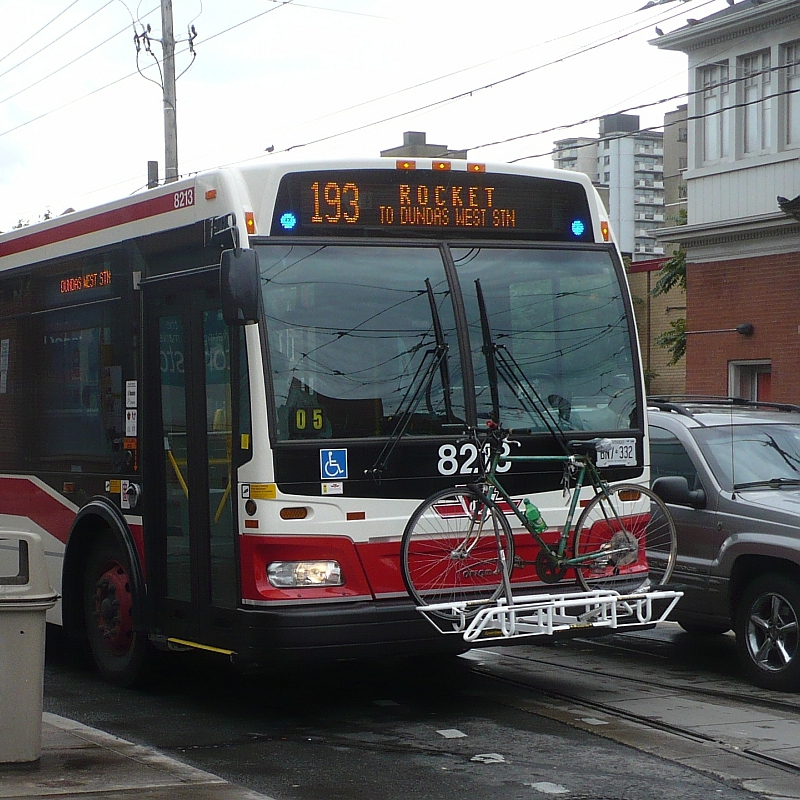
Bicycle rack-mounted on a TTC Orion VII NG bus

All TTC buses, except Wheel-Trans vehicles, are equipped with folding bicycle racks installed on the front of the bus. Depending on the bus model, the rack can hold either one or two bicycles. Cyclists must remove all loose or detachable accessories from bicycles stored on the rack. If all the rack slots are full, bicycles may be stored inside buses except during rush hours.

==== Background ====
In mid-2005, the TTC began a pilot project to test bicycle racks on six selected routes as a way to boost ridership and to be more environmentally friendly.

In July 2007, the Commission authorized the addition of bike racks to the remainder of the TTC bus fleet except for buses to be retired over the following three years. The 2007 expenditure for installation was an unbudgeted $250,000, to be covered by a shortfall in 2007 capital expenditures. The Commission included another $1,720,000 in the 2008–2012 capital budget to install bike racks on remaining buses. All new buses ordered would be delivered either with bike racks installed or at least mounting brackets for TTC staff to install the racks. In December 2011, bike racks were available on all TTC buses except minibuses.

The Nova Bus LFS articulated buses came factory-equipped with bike racks, as did the non-articulated LFS buses that entered service in 2015. The racks were sealed in October 2014, by order of the Ministry of Labour, because of concerns about bikes on the racks obscuring the drivers' view. In May 2015, the slot closer to the bus was authorised for use. The other is sealed off with metal panels, and the retention hooks have been removed. Once the first slot is full, cyclists may bring their bikes inside the articulated bus during off-peak hours at the driver's discretion.

== Shelters ==
Prior to the 1980s, the bus shelters on TTC routes were installed and maintained by the TTC and the various municipalities of Metropolitan Toronto and lacked third-party advertising. Within the old city of Toronto, they were metal frames with large glass panes, but the suburban ones were metal-clad with fibreglass and smaller glass windows. A few older shelters, like Otter Loop (Small Arms and Coxwell Loops were similar for use on streetcar routes), were formal brick-and-glass structures; most of these disappeared in the 1960s or 1970s, with Otter's structure surviving into the early 2000s. However, during the mid-2010s, the Otter Loop bus shelter was removed and the area was converted into Heart Park.

Shelters and related third-party advertising displays had been installed by Trans Ad and later by Outfront Media (formerly CBS Outdoor, Mediacom and TDI) and Astral Media (a division of Bell Canada), both of which are also responsible for all other forms of non-electronic advertising on the TTC (excluding posters and digital advertising in the Toronto subway system and on buses and streetcars, which are managed by Pattison Outdoor Advertising, which includes OneStop Media for digital billboards).

== See also ==
- GM New Look (Toronto Transit Commission bus)
