= Travelways =

Travelways Transportation was a chartered and school bus operator in the Greater Toronto Area and one of a few sub-contractors to GO Transit during the early years. It had operated other transit agencies like:

- Markham Transit 1973-1984
- Burlington Transit
- Beacon Hill Bullet 1971-1973 in Ottawa, Ontario
- Algar Coach Lines Limited in Lindsay, Ontario

The company was based in Markham, Ontario and acquired by Laidlaw in 1979. Renamed Travelways School Transit in 1988, the transit operations were later absorbed into the Laidlaw's transit operations.

== Fleet ==
- Motor Coach Industries MC5
- Motor Coach Industries MC7
- Motor Coach Industries MC8
- Motor Coach Industries MC9
