= York Region Transit =

Public transit operator in York Region, Canada

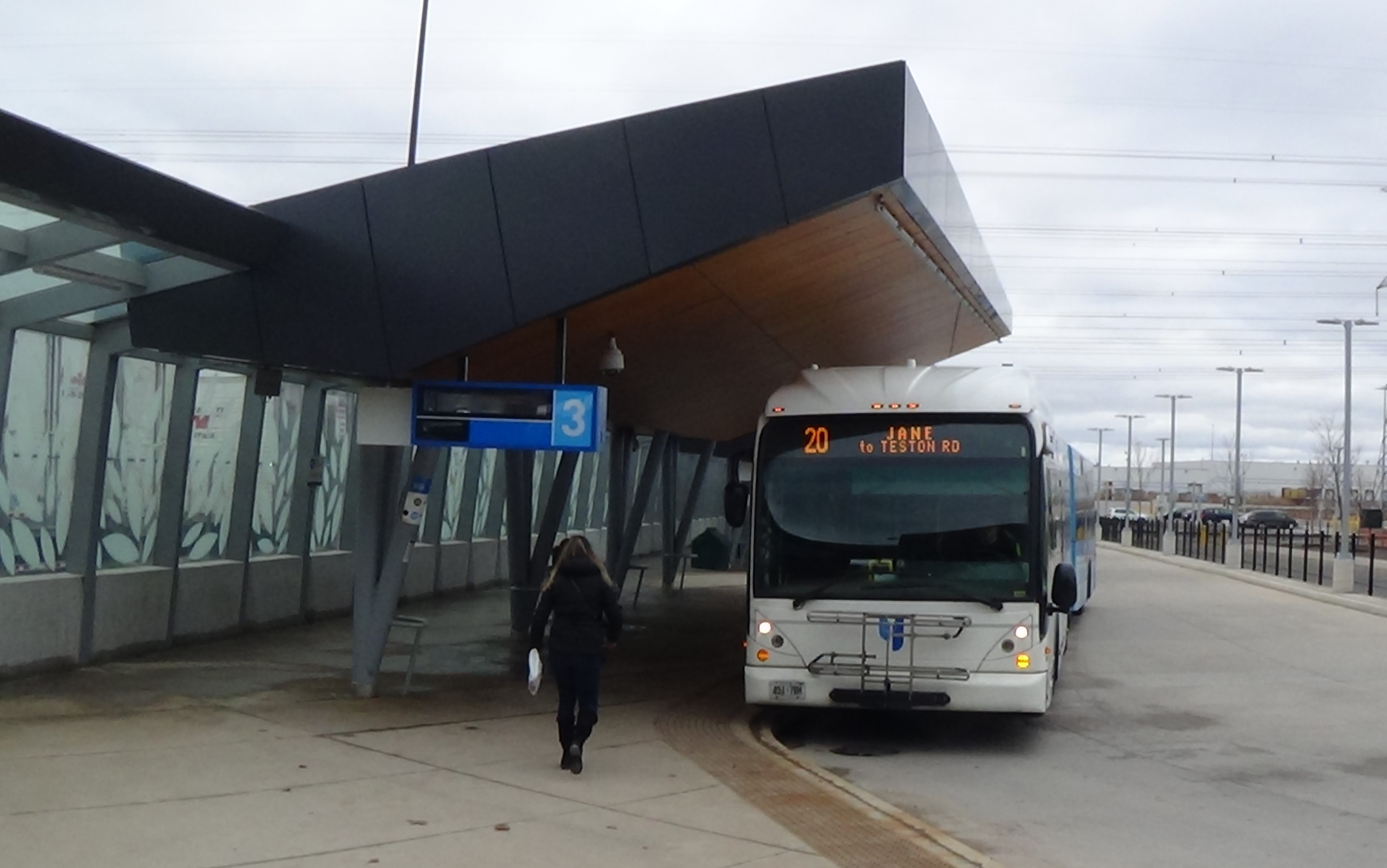
- 20 Jane bus at Pioneer Village station
- Parent: Regional Municipality of York
- Founded: 2001; 25 years ago
- Headquarters: 50 High Tech Road, Richmond Hill, Ontario
- Locale: York Region (with some service into Toronto and Brampton)
- Service area: Greater Toronto Area
- Service type: Bus service, bus rapid transit
- Alliance: Toronto Transit Commission; Brampton Transit
- Routes: 116 conventional, 6 Viva, 5 TTC-contracted
- Stops: 4,324
- Fleet: 406 conventional YRT buses; 123 Viva bus rapid transit; 97 Mobility Plus vehicles
- Daily ridership: 82,600 (weekdays, Q2 2026)
- Annual ridership: 24,342,000 (2025)
- Fuel type: Diesel
- Operator: see Operations
- General Manager: Kyle Catney
- Website: yrt.ca

York Region Transit (YRT) is the public transit operator in York Region, Ontario, Canada. Its headquarters are in Richmond Hill, at 50 High Tech Road. The system was founded on January 1, 2001, through the merger of four transit systems namely Markham Transit, Vaughan Transit, Richmond Hill Transit and Newmarket Transit.

YRT operates 65 full-time rush hour and limited routes, 35 school services, and six Viva bus rapid transit routes. Five contracted Toronto Transit Commission (TTC) bus routes run within York Region's boundaries (one in Vaughan and four in Markham).

Some YRT routes operate within the City of Toronto; these buses generally run to and from TTC subway stations. YRT northbound buses are allowed to pick up passengers south of Steeles Avenue if they are heading into York Region (passengers must flag the bus from a designated TTC or YRT stop). YRT buses heading to a TTC subway station can similarly drop off passengers at designated stops south of Steeles Avenue but are not permitted to pick up passengers from these stops. As the majority of passengers are assumed to be transferring to and from TTC services, no extra fare is charged for riders boarding or disembarking YRT buses within Toronto.

== Ridership ==
In the fourth quarter of 2022, average weekday ridership was approximately 64,800 on buses and 1,200 on MobilityPlus, a service for people with disabilities. 22.8 million riders used YRT in 2016, a 1.4% increase over 2015.

== History ==
Prior to the inauguration of YRT in 2001, public transit in York Region (York County prior to 1971) was delivered by a patchwork of various operators in some of the lower-tier municipalities, with some cross-boundary services in more heavily urbanized areas. Most of the cross-boundary service was either GO Transit running "city"-type bus routes or the present TTC-contracted routes (with some being replaced with YRT routes or cancelled) coming north from Metropolitan Toronto or later (and present) Toronto. Gray Coach also provided some medium-distance commuter services.

=== Former inter-municipal services ===
Stagecoaches or omnibuses ran along Yonge Street to hotels in Richmond Hill from York (now Toronto) beginning in the 1820s. The Metropolitan Street Railway ran electric interurban streetcars on Yonge Street as far north as Keswick from 1897 to 1930. Publicly owned (via TTC) North Yonge Railways provided interurban service on Yonge Street from 1930 to 1948.

From 1948 to 1977, the Toronto Transit Commission (Toronto Transportation Commission before 1954) ran the North Yonge 59 bus route on Yonge. Other contracted TTC routes later followed on many other streets continuing from Metro Toronto. The North Yonge bus was replaced by GO Transit–operated Yonge C and B bus routes, with C providing local suburban bus service to Richmond Hill, and B providing service all the way to Newmarket until being replaced in turn by Viva Blue in 2010. Another local C route, starting in 1972, ran on Bayview Avenue as far as Richmond Hill.

=== Former local services ===
Before the 1970s, several private and public transit operators provided local transit services around York Region communities: These services were later replaced by the following municipally managed transit systems, with the earlier operators continuing to operate the new systems in some cases (the history of these predecessor local services are also described for each municipality).

==== Markham Transit ====
Markham Transit was created in 1973 and operated by Travelways and Miller Transit Limited after 1984 on behalf of the then–Town of Markham.

==== Richmond Hill Transit ====
Richmond Hill Transit was created in 1960 to provide public transit service in Richmond Hill. It was initially operated by Trailways of Canada Limited, then Travelways starting in 1976 and Laidlaw in the 1980s.

==== Vaughan Transit ====
Vaughan Transit operated from 1973 until the merger into YRT. Before (and for two years after) the creation of Vaughan Transit, transit service was provided to the community of Woodbridge by the TTC-operated 93 Woodbridge bus between 1954 and 1975. Prior to that, various private operators provided a similar service, starting in 1925. Even earlier, an interurban line served Woodbridge between 1913 and 1926.

==== Newmarket Transit ====
Newmarket Transit began sometime in the early 1970s as a contracted service from the town. Previously service was provide first by Newmarket Bus Lines circa 1948, renamed Newmarket Town Bus circa 1958, which ran to 1967.

==== Aurora ====
Aurora Transit began operations in 1973, replacing Aurora Bus lines, which operated starting in the 1960s. Like Newmarket, Aurora was much smaller in size and population than other southern York Region municipalities, which benefited from connections to GO Transit and the TTC. Aurora Transit provided feeder service to GO Transit's commuter trains and buses as well as community bus service to town's major destinations.

A fare arrangement between Aurora Transit and GO Transit allowed passengers to use Aurora Transit tickets on GO Transit's "Route B" buses that provided local service on Yonge Street, provided the entire trip was within Aurora's town limits. Passengers travelling to the neighbouring Oak Ridges or Newmarket could still use Aurora Transit tickets with a cash supplement.

On August 30, 1998, Aurora Transit restructured its services into a single route with service in the southern part of the town provided by Richmond Hill Transit. At the same time, Newmarket Transit route 77/11 was extended south on Bayview Avenue to connect with Aurora Transit's only route at Bayview Shopping Centre. Aurora Transit ended its operations on September 4, 1999, when the transit service in the town was transferred to Newmarket Transit. The latter became part of the York Region Transit on January 1, 2001, when the four regional transit systems were merged.

=== Creation of YRT ===
YRT was created by the regional government in 2001 by amalgamating the four municipal transit authorities in the region as increasing urbanization made separate municipal transit agencies impractical. Viva was inaugurated in 2005.

In mid-2006, the YRT logo was modified to bear closer resemblance to the Viva logo and, by the end of the year, most of the YRT fleet and bus stop signs had their looks changed to bear the new colours.

== Operations ==
Transit services in York Region are divided into four divisions and are provided by private operators under contract.

=== Viva BRT Division ===
The bus rapid transit (BRT) division operates the six Viva Rapid Transit bus routes and uses the 196-bus garage near Leslie Street and 16th Avenue in Richmond Hill. In 2015, TOK Transit began a seven-year contract, replacing Veolia Transportation (Transdev) as operator.

=== North Division ===
The North Division includes several bus routes in Newmarket, Aurora, King Township, East Gwillimbury and Georgina. TOK Transit also operates this division and is under contract until April 30, 2021.

=== Southeast Division ===
The Southeast Division includes routes in Markham, Richmond Hill, and Stouffville. It is operated by Miller Transit who are under contract until October 2023.

=== Southwest Division ===
Transdev Canada is under contract of this division until August 1, 2021.

== Bus rapid transit ==
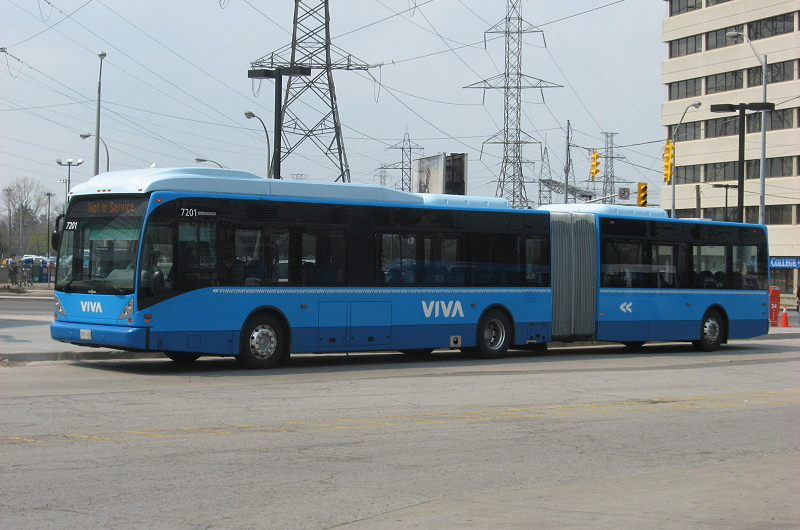
Viva uses a special fleet of high-end NovaBus and Van Hool buses.

In response to escalating congestion on the region's roads, York Region's transit plan included a provision for a bus rapid transit system along the Yonge Street and Highway 7 arterial corridors. This service, known as Viva, was launched in September 2005.

== Fares ==
Fares for riding YRT can be paid by cash, Presto card, or the mobile Presto E-Tickets app. Customers can also pay the equivalent of the YRT adult cash fare prices via contactless credit or debit card. YRT discontinued the sale and use of monthly passes from January 2024 onwards. They were replaced by a monthly fare capping system only available on the Presto card.

As of 1 July 2026, YRT fares are as follows:

| Fare category | Presto card and Presto e-ticket (single-use fare) | Single-ride cash fare, credit and debit card |
|---|---|---|
| Adults (ages 20–64) | $4.24 (free after 40 paid rides in a month) | $4.65 |
| Youth (ages 13–19) | $3.29 (free after 39 rides in a month) | $4.65 |
| Child (ages 6–12) (Note: Children under the age of 5 ride fare-free on YRT.) or senior (ages 65+) | $2.60 (free after 28 rides in a month) | $4.65 |

Other fares:

| Fare category | Price |
|---|---|
| Ride to GO fare integration discount | Free |

Two separate methods of payments are used by transit routes serving York Region:

- "Pay as you board" on conventional YRT and TTC-operated bus routes.
- "Proof of payment" basis on all Viva routes (customers may board or disembark at any door)

York Region's rapid transit bus service, Viva, operates on a "pre-paid proof-of-payment (POP)" system, meaning passengers in possession of POP can board these buses at any door. Unlike conventional YRT buses, Viva buses are not equipped with onboard fare boxes, which means passengers are required to purchase single-ride tickets from curbside fare vending machines; or use a Presto card, or contactless credit or debit card, on the YRT Presto fare readers located beside the fare vending machines; or activate their mobile ticket or pass at the platforms prior to boarding. A single-ride ticket has the date and expiry time printed on it at the time of purchase and does not need to be validated.

Paper POP tickets and transfers are not issued to Presto, credit and debit card holders users since these payment methods act as POP. Time-based fares and transfers allow for unlimited travel within York Region on a single fare for two hours, including transfers to and from Brampton Transit, Züm, as well as TTC-operated bus routes in York Region (north of Steeles Avenue).

Since February 26, 2024, under the One Fare Program, a Greater Toronto and Hamilton Area (GTHA)–wide fare integration policy, passengers paying by Presto card, credit card or debit card are eligible for free transfers between YRT and the TTC subway and bus routes in the City Of Toronto (south of Steeles Avenue) within 2 hours of initial fare payment. However, customers paying by other means are not eligible for the One Fare program and are still required to pay an additional fare when transferring between YRT and the TTC subway and when crossing Steeles on a TTC bus in either direction.

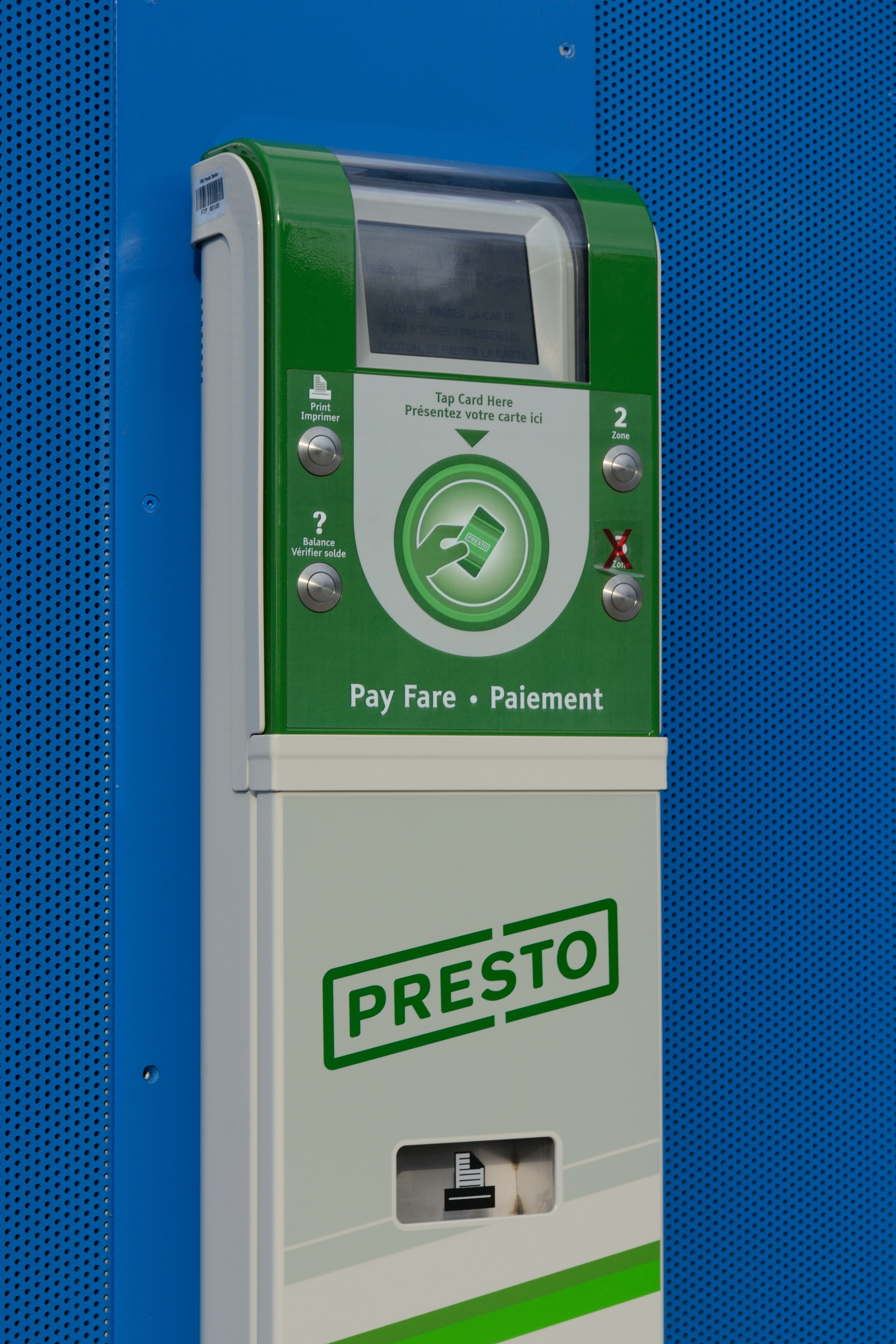
YRT's old-style Presto tap machines at Vivastations (2011–2020)

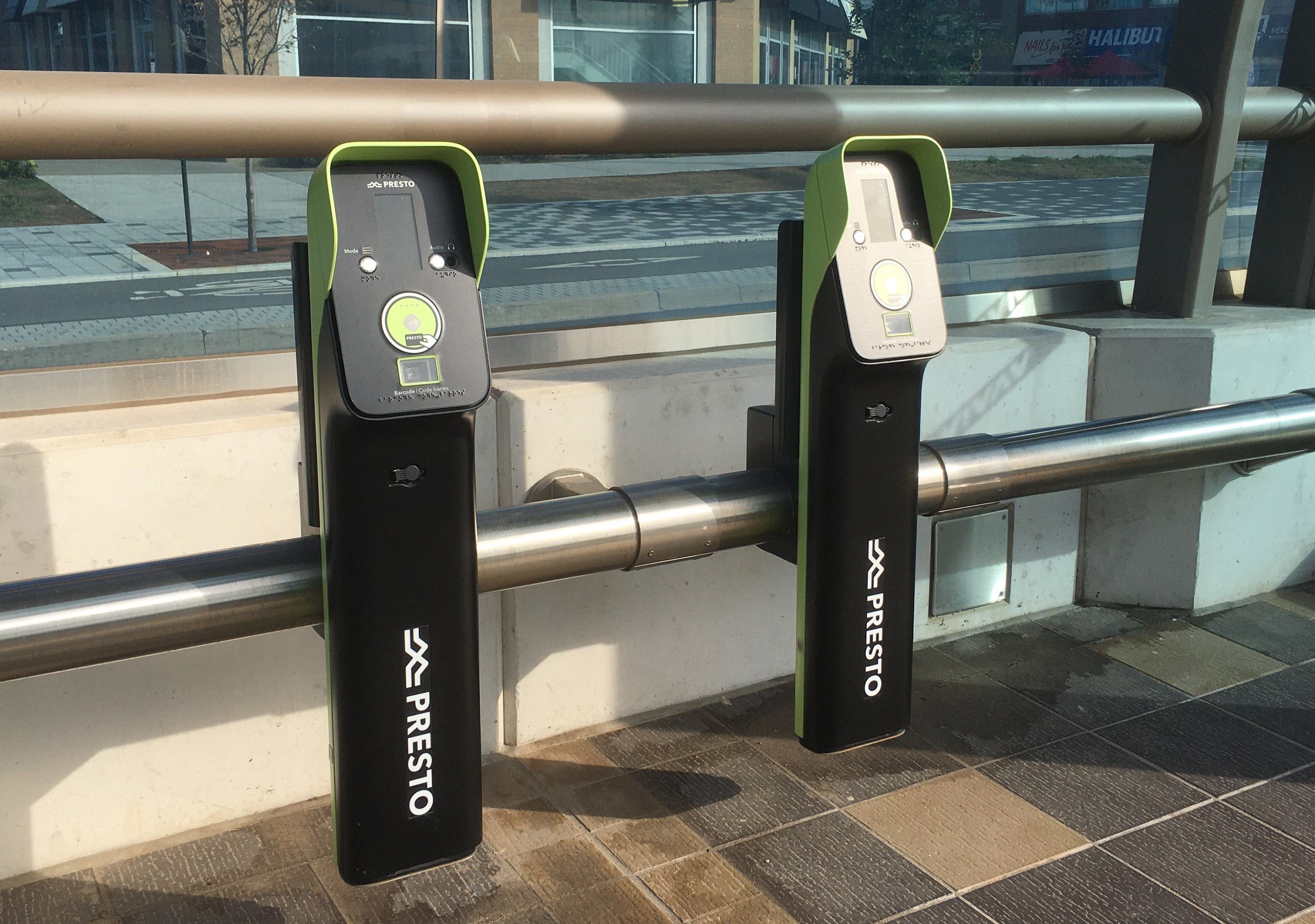
YRT's current Presto tap machines at Vivastations (2020–present)

=== Former fare zones ===
On July 1, 2017, YRT removed fare zones, allowing customers to travel within the region for only one fare. Previously, the YRT/Viva service area was divided into three fare zones. Zone 3 was defined as the portion of York Region north of Ravenshoe Road, and Zones 1 and 2 were divided by Bloomington Road for northbound passengers, just south of King Road for southbound passengers. Passengers crossing a zone boundary had to pay a zone fare supplement in addition to the regular fares.

=== GO Transit co-fares ===
As with many other transit agencies within the Greater Toronto and Hamilton Area, YRT offers free transfers between YRT or Viva buses and GO Transit under its "Ride to GO" program. Passengers may transfer from a GO Transit route to a YRT bus route or TTC-operated bus routes in York Region (north of Steeles Avenue) and receive free admission onto YRT so long as the passenger provides the GO Transit proof of payment ticket. Since Viva is operated on a proof-of-purchase system and single Viva fares are paid or purchased at curbside fare vending machines, riders must use a Presto card when transferring between Viva and GO Transit services in order to access the Ride to GO co-fare discount.

The GO Transit co-fare discount is available to all passengers who pay single YRT bus fares on their stored Presto card balance: passengers will automatically be assessed the co-fare (and any YRT or Viva fare supplements, if necessary) when transferring from GO Transit to YRT/Viva services regardless of where the passenger boards the YRT bus. Similarly, passengers transferring from YRT/Viva to GO Transit services will also be reimbursed the difference between the YRT fare and the co-fare upon disembarking from GO Transit (effectively, the YRT portion of the journey is paid with a co-fare).

=== TTC services in York Region ===
==== Buses ====
Some TTC bus routes travel into York Region and operate on behalf of YRT. This allows passengers to board a TTC bus in York Region and disembark in the City of Toronto and vice versa.

Passengers who board such routes in Toronto pay a TTC fare, while those boarding in York Region pay a YRT fare.

Since August 26, 2019, riders have been able to use their Presto card to pay both their YRT and TTC fares on TTC-operated bus routes that travel between York Region and Toronto. While single-use TTC-only paper Presto tickets can be used to pay a TTC fare for the subway (whether in York Region or Toronto) or TTC surface routes in Toronto, they cannot be used to pay a YRT fare on YRT- and TTC-operated bus routes in York Region.

Certain YRT routes enter Toronto, but City of Toronto regulations mean that passengers may not board inbound (towards Toronto) or disembark on outbound (away from Toronto) YRT routes in Toronto. No extra fare is charged for travel solely on YRT vehicles in Toronto.

==== Subway ====
On December 17, 2017, the western branch of Line 1 was extended into York Region. Coinciding with that opening, YRT took over the operation of four TTC-operated routes in Vaughan. Unlike the policy with TTC-operated bus routes in York, no extra fare was ever charged when boarding or disembarking at Highway 407 and Vaughan Metropolitan Centre stations in Vaughan, due to the impracticality of a payment-on-exit system. Under the fare integration policy, riders using card payment can transfer between YRT and TTC services within two hours of initial payment, with the additional fare for cash payment still required when transferring between YRT bus routes and the subway at these stations, as it is at stations located in or bordering Toronto, such as Finch or Pioneer Village as well as with connecting TTC bus routes operating in Toronto.

=== Brampton Transit fares in York Region ===
An agreement between YRT and Brampton Transit means passengers boarding Züm Queen east of Highway 50 (which largely duplicates service with Viva Orange while in York Region) will be assessed YRT fares even if they intend to disembark in Brampton. As a Brampton Transit route, Brampton Transit fare media (including those loaded onto a Presto card) may be used to board without any additional fares being assessed. However, despite the fare integration, passengers boarding with YRT passes will not be issued transfers for connecting to Brampton Transit routes in Brampton, and passengers boarding with Brampton Transit passes will not be issued transfers for connecting to YRT routes in York Region.

Brampton Transit and YRT have cooperated on routes connecting Brampton and Toronto via York Region, and for a time, certain YRT routes were jointly operated by YRT and Brampton Transit buses, where both agencies' fare media were accepted. The introduction of Züm Queen has ended operation of YRT route 77 to Bramalea City Centre. The acceptance of YRT fares on Brampton Transit routes in York Region are the last vestiges of such cooperation.

== Vehicles and fleet rosters ==
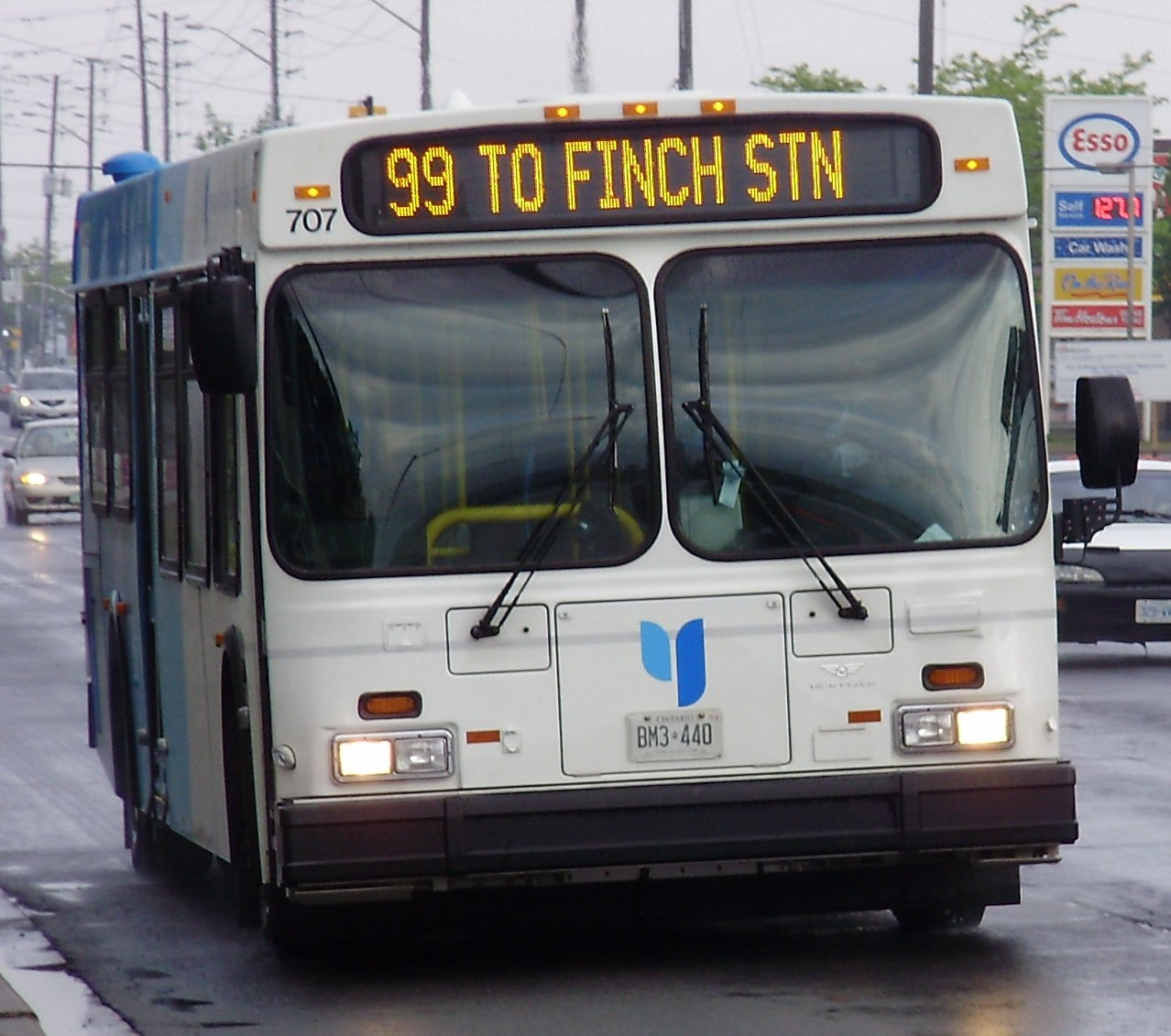
2007 New Flyer D40LF #707, running south of Steeles Avenue on the Route 99 Yonge

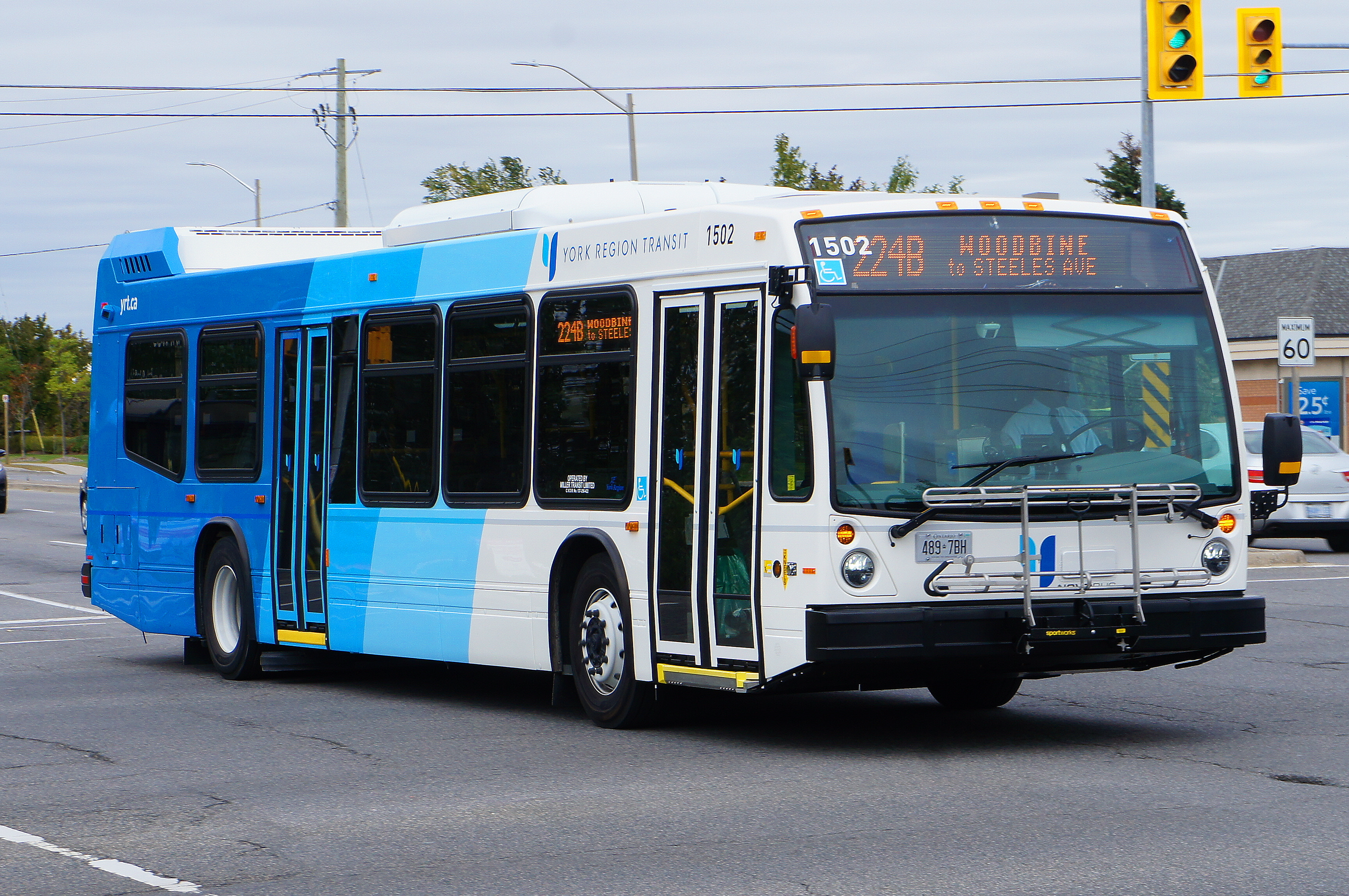
2015 Nova Bus LFS #1502 on Route 224B Woodbine

YRT has 123 Viva bus rapid transit vehicles, 406 York Region Transit buses, and 97 Mobility Plus vehicles. The initial fleet consisted of buses from previous York Region operators, but has since been expanded with YRT-bought vehicles.

=== Fleet colours ===
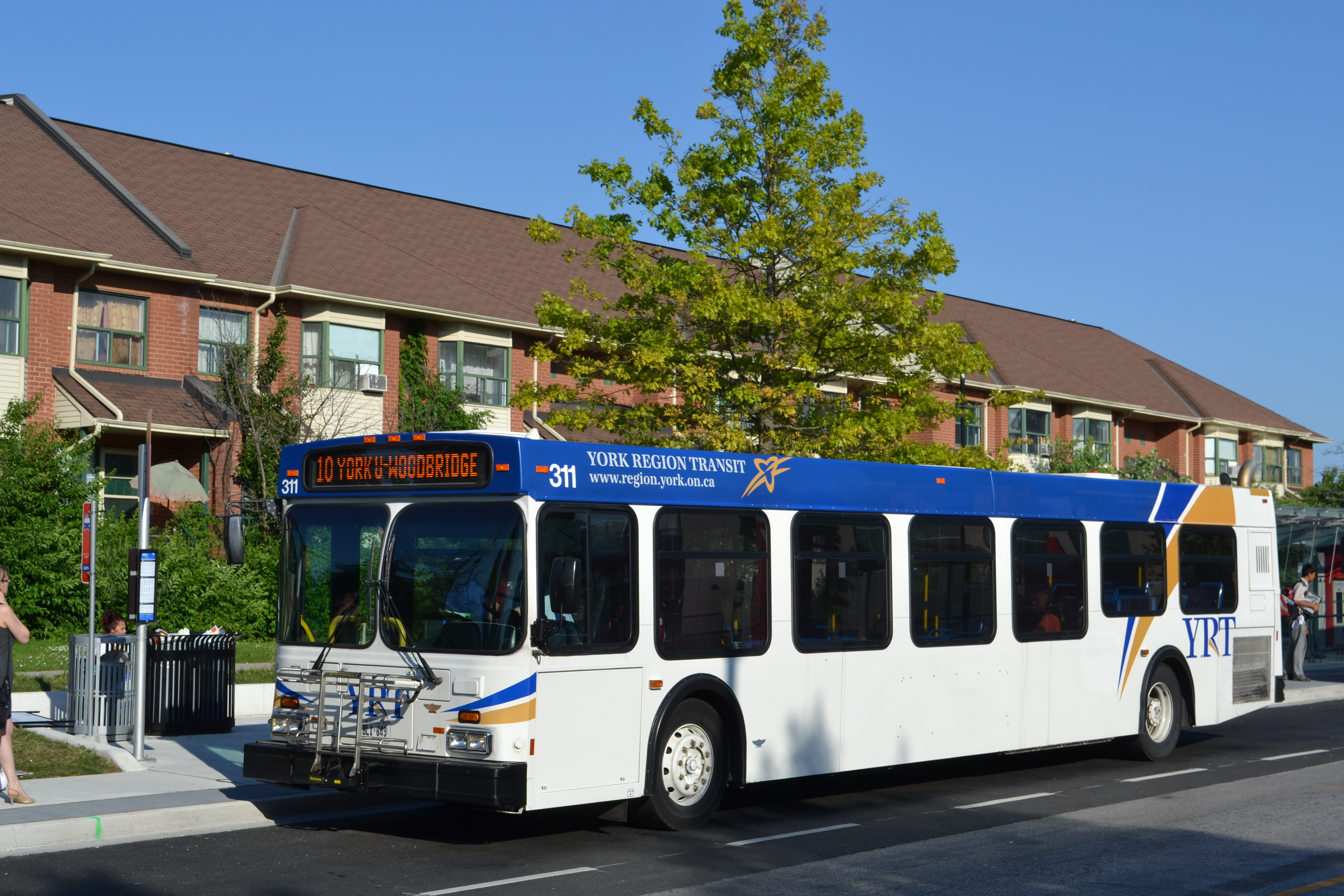
YRT old fleet colours 2001–2006

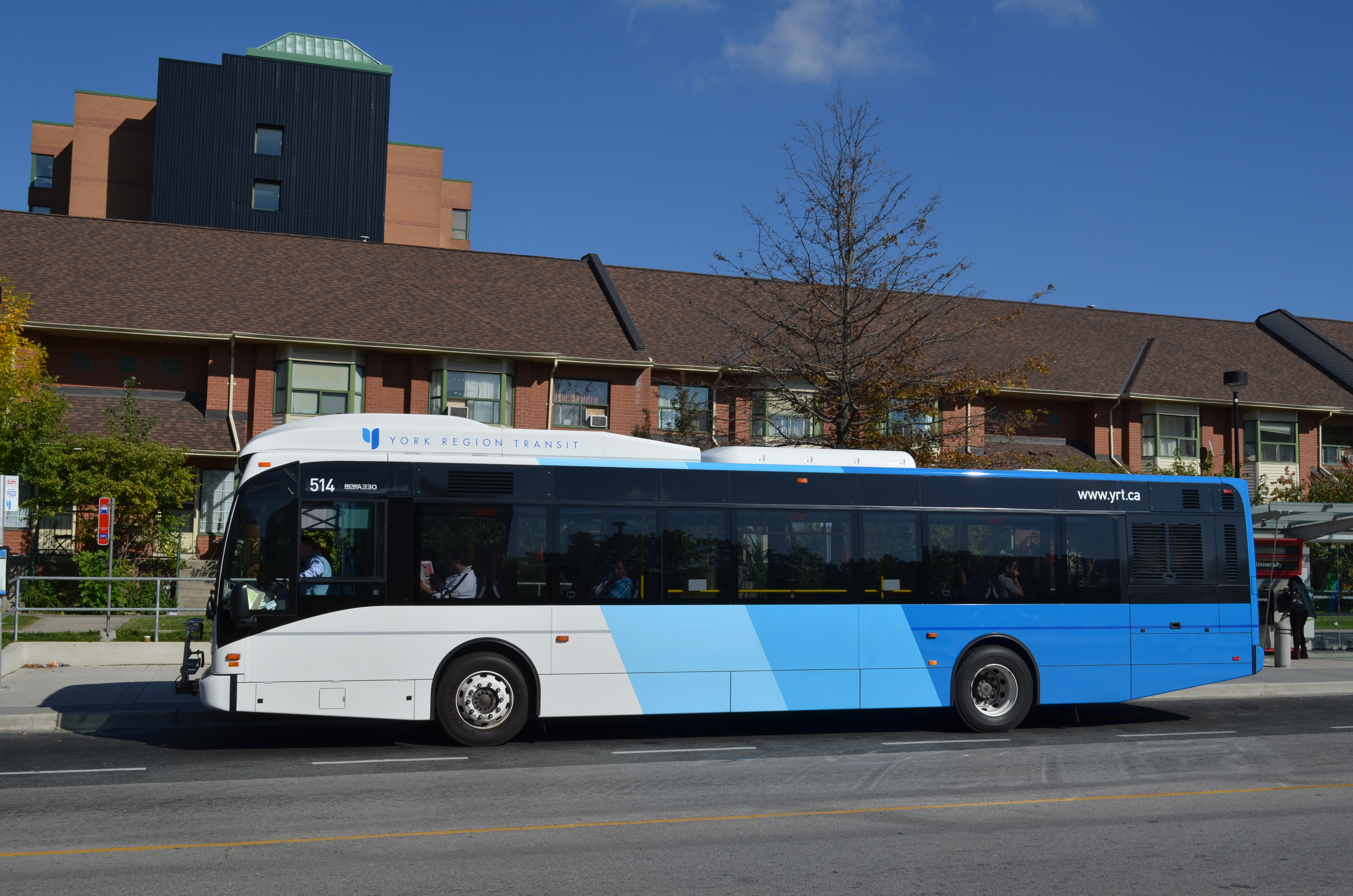
YRT current fleet colours 2007–present

YRT's first fleet (2001–2006) was painted with a white base with blue and gold stripes. During the agency's early years, many buses still sported the pre-2000 colours of their previous operators, with "YRT" painted on the front and sides. The livery was changed in 2007 to white and several tones of blue. Only the Viva fleet is all-blue, but one Orion I YRT (#2028) was painted all-blue for a colour demo. During the transition to the second colour theme, some buses were all white with the old "YRT" label remaining.

== Transit enforcement ==
Fare inspectors and special constables patrol the entire YRT transit system for the safety and security of passengers and to ensure compliance with the proof-of-payment system used on Viva buses. They do random spot checks on board Viva buses to ensure the proper use of tickets, transfers and Presto cards. There is a time limit to be riding while paying one fare, and passengers without valid fares (even those whose two-hour travel window expires while on board a vehicle) are subject to a warning, fine, or a criminal charge.

=== CCTV cameras ===
In 2006, YRT began installing 150 cameras on YRT (including Viva and Mobility Plus) buses. By the end of 2008, there were to be 210 more cameras added to the system's vehicles. CCTV cameras are also installed in some of the Vivastations in Richmond Hill.

== YRT-operated terminals and facilities ==
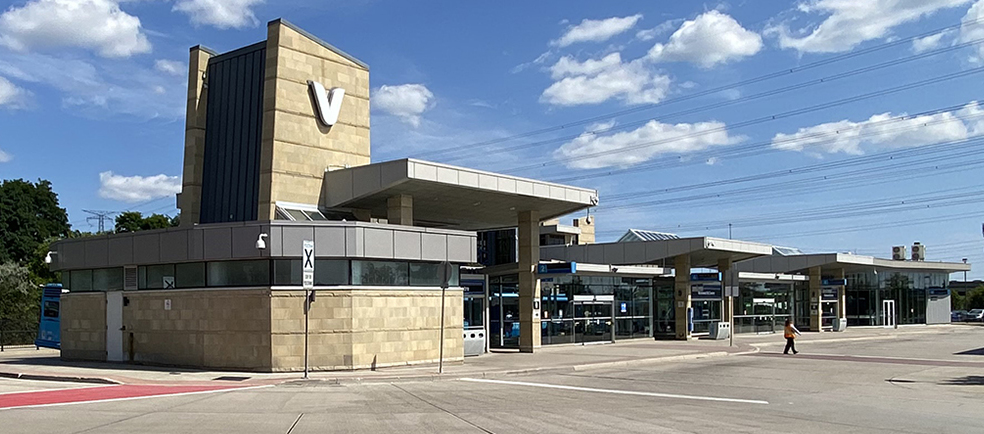
Richmond Hill Centre Terminal

YRT owns a few facilities, with many shared with other transit agencies like the TTC, GO Transit and Brampton Transit.

- Bernard Terminal – driveway and platforms only
- Cornell Terminal – terminal building with platforms
- Major Mackenzie West Terminal – terminal building with platforms
- Pioneer Village Terminal – adjacent to Pioneer Village subway station
- Promenade Terminal – platforms only; no terminal building (shelters only)
- Richmond Hill Centre Terminal – terminal building with platforms; bridge connecting to Langstaff GO train station
- SmartVMC Bus Terminal – adjacent to Vaughan Metropolitan Centre subway station
- Newmarket Terminal – adjacent to Upper Canada Mall
- Vaughan Metropolitan Centre Vivastation – covered transfer facility at Vaughan Metropolitan Centre station
- Vaughan Mills Terminal – platforms only; no terminal building (shelters only)
- Numerous Viva stations along on-street Rapidways

Garages used to store buses are owned by contractors.

== 2011–2012 labour strike ==
Starting on October 24, 2011, bus drivers and workers contracted by Miller Transit, First Student and York BRT Services (Veolia) started striking, protesting over wages and benefits for three months. Over 60 percent of YRT bus routes in York region and all Viva routes did not operate. YRT and Viva workers started picketing on December 5, 2011, at Finch-GO Terminal, YRT headquarters, South-West Division Garage, and Richmond Hill Centre Terminal. 96% of all YRT/Viva routes returned to service on February 4, 2012, and 98% of services were operational by February 6, 2012. Full YRT/Viva service resumed on February 27, 2012. To compensate riders for the three months of service disruptions, York Region Transit provided two months of free service, using the money saved by not having to pay striking workers.

== Officers ==
In December 2014, the executive of YRT consisted of:

- Chair: Wayne Emmerson (as York Region chair)
- Vice-chair (regional councillor): Dave Barrow

Operational executives are:

- Commissioner of Transportation Services: Daniel Kostopoulos
- General manager (GM): Ann-Marie Carroll – became GM December 2014 and interim GM from early 2014 to December 2014
- Richard J. Leary served as GM from 2010 to 2014; he had been Massachusetts Bay Transportation Authority chief operating officer and replaced YRT's first head Donald Gordon (2001–2009) and left in early 2014 for the Toronto Transit Commission)
- Vice-President of York Region Rapid Transit Corporation: Mary-Frances Turner

== See also ==
- MoveOntario 2020
