= The Miller Group Marketing Los Angeles =

Advertising and marketing agency based in Los Angeles

The Miller Group Advertising, Inc.
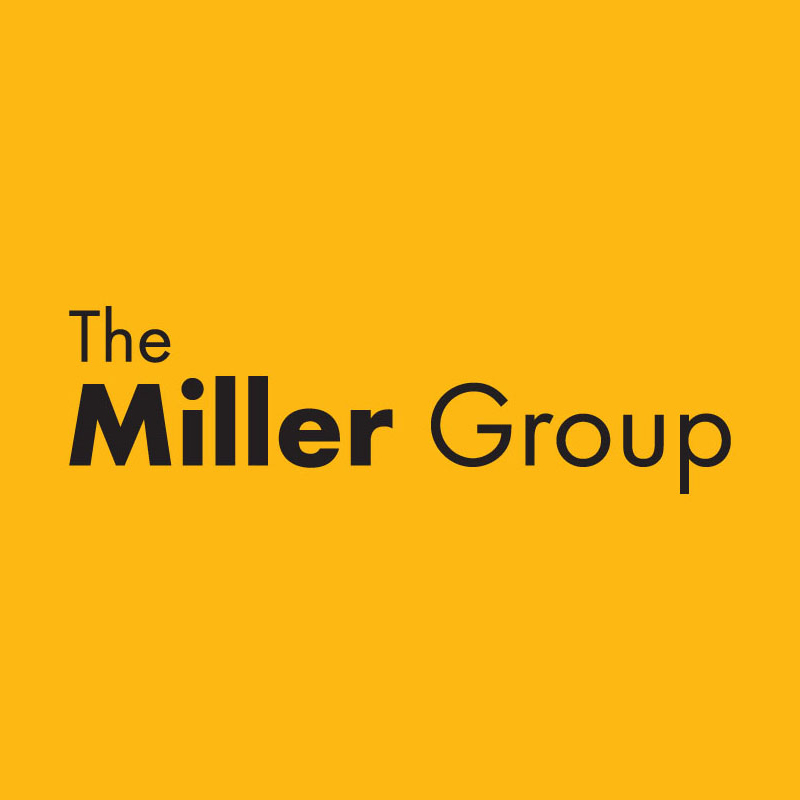
- Type: Advertising agency
- Industry: Advertising Services/Agencies (54180)
- Founded: 1990
- Founder: Renee Miller
- Headquarters: Los Angeles, United States
- Number of locations: Los Angeles, Dallas, New York
- Services: Brand Revitalization, Video Production, Strategy, Research, Digital, Creative, Media, Social Media, New Product Launches, Lead Generation
- Number of employees: 10
- Website: millergroupmarketing.com

The Miller Group Advertising, Inc. is a digital advertising and marketing agency in Los Angeles. It was founded in 1990, by Renee Miller, the agency's president and executive creative director. The agency has won many creative awards over the years, and has worked on a number of national brands, including Kenwood Electronics, Goodwill, RE/MAX, General Electric, SubZero [The Wolf Range Company] [simplehuman], [Pocky], [Gelson's Supermarkets] and Anthem.

== History ==
Award-winning entrepreneur Renee Miller founded The Miller Group Advertising, Inc. in 1990. By 2004, Gary M. Bettman who was enjoying a professional background in the movie industry, joined The Miller Group. As a producer of feature films, he worked with stars like Billy Bob Thornton, Lorenzo Lamas, and Mark Cuban. In 2007, the agency expanded its presence to Dallas and New York.

== Capabilities ==
The agency specializes in Brand Revitalization, Video Production, Strategy, Research, Digital, Creative, Media, Social Media, New Product Launches, and Lead Generation.

On top of the day-to-day business, the agency's executives offer seminars, judge creative work and give interviews to industry relevant magazines.

== Awards and achievements ==
Over the years The Miller Group Advertising, Inc. has received many awards and recognitions:

- Consumer Magazine 2nd Place Color Page for the client Wolf Range
- One Show Award Silver for Consumer Magazine Color less than a Page for the client Wolf Range
- One Show Award Finalist for Consumer Magazine Black and White One Page for the client Gay Men's Chorus of Los Angeles
- The New York Festivals Silver Award for Newspaper Advertising for the client Woman to Woman Medical Center

== Literature ==
- Advertising Club of Los Angeles: The 30th Annual Belding Awards, 1995, p. 98.
- Communication Arts: Advertising Annual 41, Volume 42, Number 7, Menlo Park 2000, p. 166, ISSN 0010-3519.
- Communication Arts: Design Annual 50, Volume 51, Number 5, Menlo Park 2009, p. 157, ISSN 0010-3519.
- Michael R. Solomon: Consumer Behavior - Buying, Having, and Being, 7th ed., Pearson, Upper Saddle River 2006, p. 98, ISBN 0-13-218694-2.
- The New York Festivals - The World's Best Work: International Print, Radio & Television Advertising Awards, Annual2, The New Yorks Festival, New York 1993, p. 249, ISSN 1076-3171.
- The One Show: Judged to be Advertising's best Print, Radio, TV, Volume 16, RotoVision S.A., Mies 1994, p. 250, ISBN 0-929837-07-X.
- The One Show: Judged to be Advertising's best Print, Radio, TV, Volume 18, RotoVision S.A., Crans-Pres-Celigny 1996, p. 28, ISBN 0-929837-10-X.
