= Miller Group (construction company) =

Canadian transportation construction company

The Miller Group is a diverse transportation construction company and subsidiary of the Colas Group. It is headquartered in Markham, Ontario, Canada, with its U.S. headquarters in Morrow, Georgia.

== History ==
Miller was founded as AE Jupp Construction Company in Toronto, Ontario in 1917 by Albert Ernest Jupp (1883-1945), a former City of Toronto government civil engineer Jupp previously worked for Routly and Summers and formed his company on the dissolution of his former employer.

After Jupp's death the company assets were acquired by Don Miller, whom worked for Jupp, to become Miller Paving Limited in 1946. and then acquired by Leo McArthur in 1953.

The Miller Group later diversified into other areas including:

- Waste, Recycling & Compost Services
- General Contractor and Construction Services
- Construction Materials Supplier - aggregate, asphalt, concrete, cement, minerals, redi-rock
- pavement products
- public transit contractor
- Road and Highway Maintenance - GTA contractor to Ontario Ministry of Transportation for 400-series highways
- Golf and Recreation

After Jupp's death the company assets were acquired by Don Miller, whom worked for Jupp, to become Miller Paving Limited in 1946. and then acquired by Leo McArthur in 1953. On February 28, 2018, Colas Canada completed the acquisition of 100% of the shares of the Miller McAsphalt Group. The transaction did not include former Miller McAsphalt companies engaged in non-construction operations, including Miller Waste Systems, Miller Transit, and Stirling Fuels, which continue to operate independently.

== Units ==
- Brennan Paving & Construction Limited\
- Miller Paving Limited
- Huron Construction Co. Limited
- Smith Construction
- PBS Waste Systems
- Industrial Cold Milling Limited
- Miller Cement Limited
- Mill-AM Corporation
- Miller Maintenance Limited
- Miller Minerals
- Miller Northwest Limited
- Miller Paving Northern
- Norway Asphalt Limited
- Smith's Construction Company
- Talon Sebeq Incorporated
- Vicdom Sand and Gravel Limited
- MSO Construction Limited
- McAsphalt Industries Ltd
- MacDonald Paving and Construction Limited
- Cumberland Paving Ltd
- The Murray Group Limited
- Pave-Al Ltd.

== Fleet ==
=== General ===
- GMC C-series flat bed truck
- International Truck salt trucks
- International Truck snowplows
- Mack Trucks garbage trucks

=== Snow removal ===
- Salt spreaders
- Articulated bucket loaders
- Road graders
- Tow Plows
- Deicing machines
