= Highway 407 station =

Toronto subway station

Highway 407
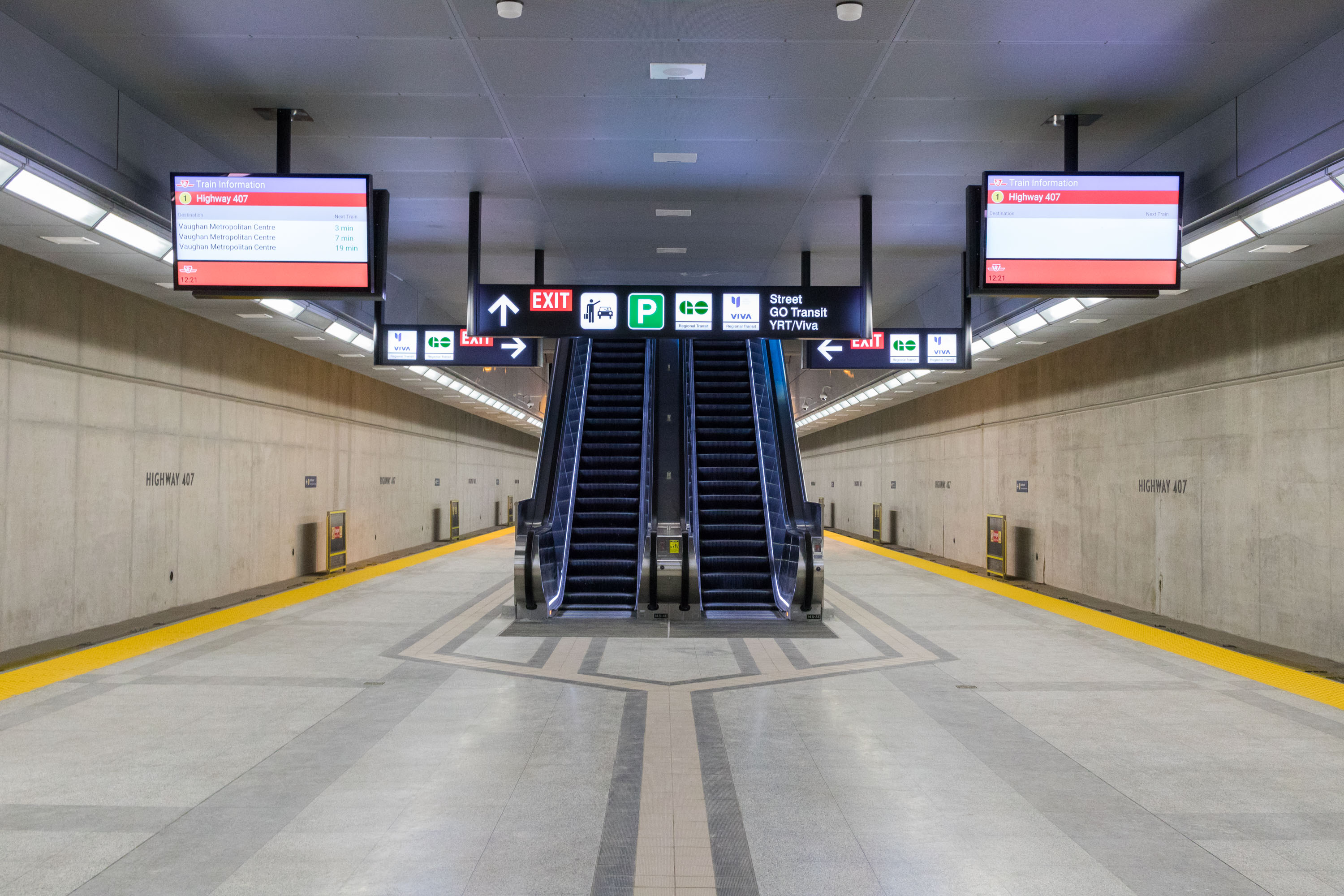
- Highway 407 station at platform level

General information
- Location: 7332 Jane Street, Vaughan, Ontario; Canada
- Coordinates: 43°47′00″N 79°31′23″W
- Platforms: Centre platform
- Tracks: 2

Construction
- Structure type: Underground
- Parking: 550 spaces
- Accessible: Yes
- Architect: Aedas
- Architectural style: Postmodern architecture

Other information
- Website: Official station page

History
- Opened: December 17, 2017; 8 years ago

Passengers
- 2023–2024: 7,649
- Rank: 60 of 70

Services
Preceding station	Toronto Transit Commission	Following station
Vaughan Terminus	Line 1 Yonge–University	Pioneer Village towards Finch
Location

Highway 407 is a Toronto Transit Commission (TTC) subway station on Line 1 Yonge–University of the Toronto subway. It is located at the southwest quadrant of the Jane Street and Highway 407 interchange, in Vaughan, Ontario, Canada. It is one of two Toronto subway stations that are outside the City of Toronto, the other being Vaughan Metropolitan Centre station.

== Description ==
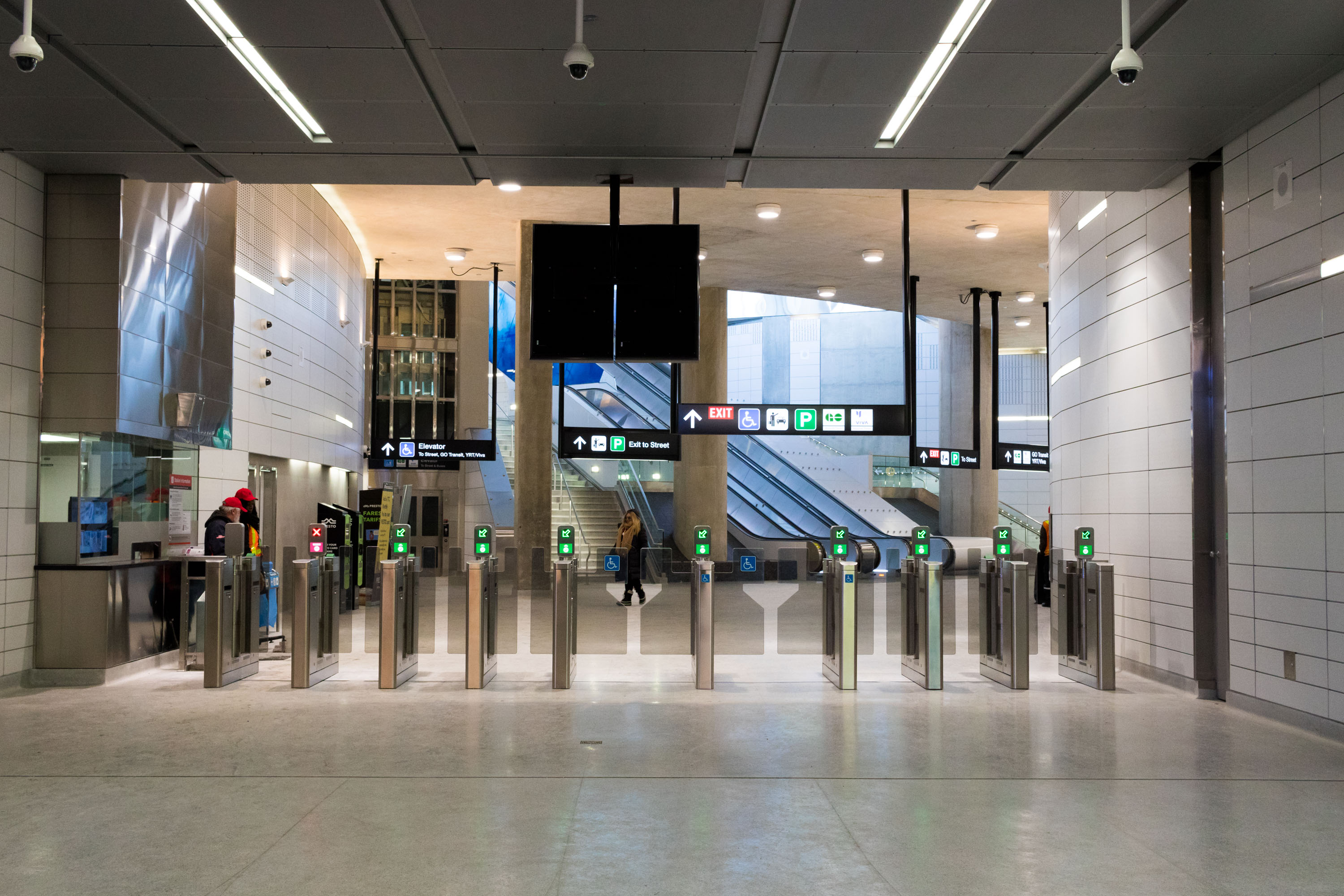
Highway 407 station fare concourse

The design team for the station was AECOM as the prime consultant, Aedas as design architect, and Parsons Brinckerhoff as design engineers. The station is an intermodal transit facility providing connections to York Region Transit (YRT), GO Transit buses, and Ontario Northland intercity coaches. It will also connect to a future Highway 407 Transitway. The station has a 550-space commuter parking lot and a large 18-bay regional bus terminal. This station has been engineered and positioned for the construction of underground bus platforms for the proposed Highway 407 Transitway. The station has an open design, particularly to the east overlooking the Black Creek. Due to structural elements related to the water table, the centre platform has no columns, with all weight being transferred to the sides to counter buoyancy. The station has a metal cool roof to reflect heat from the sun.

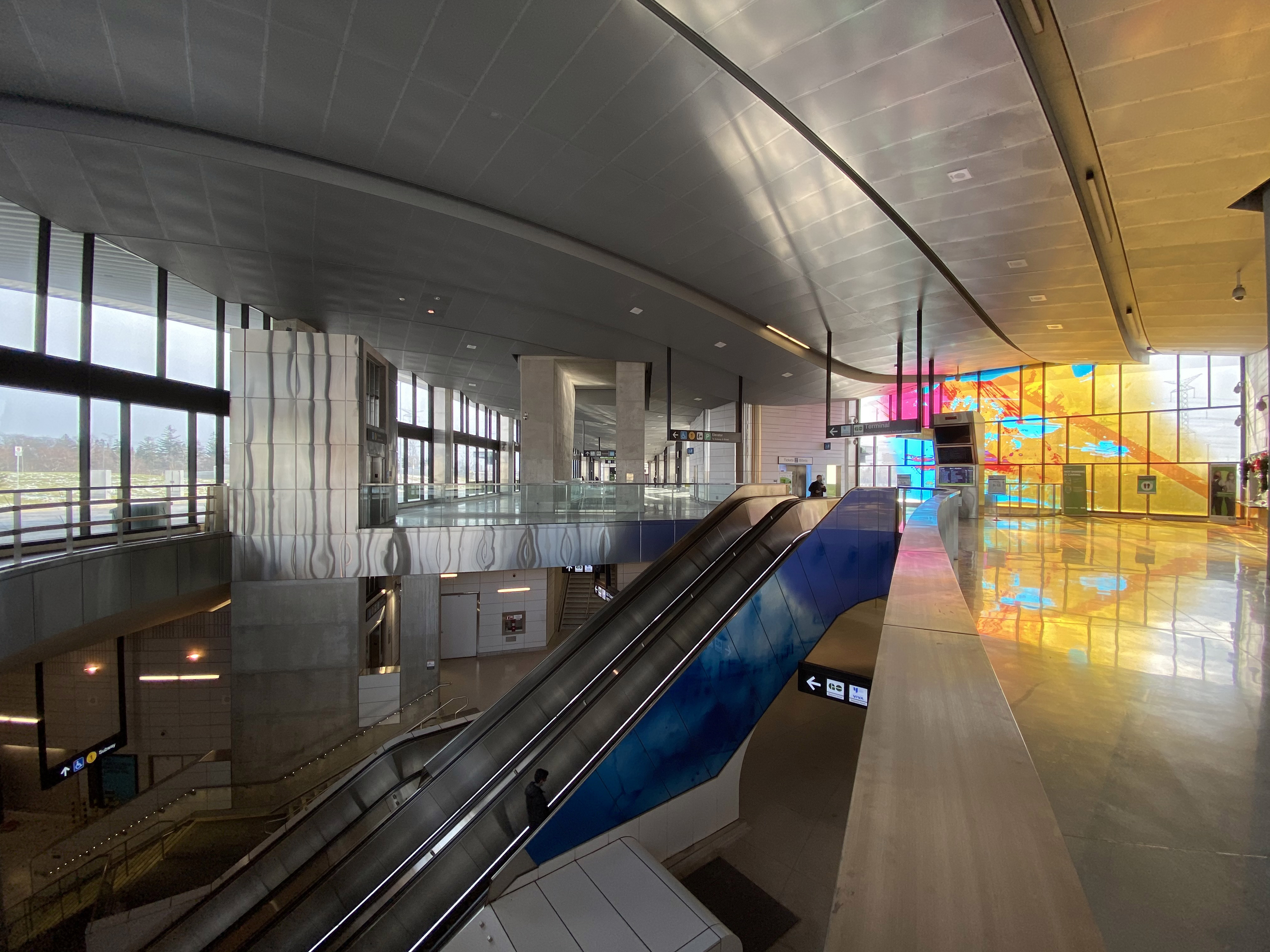
Sky Ellipse glass panel artwork by David Pearl

Toronto artist David Pearl designed the artwork titled Sky Ellipse consisting of multi-coloured glass panels for the subway skylights and the western bus terminal glass facade. The panels show moving projections of colour. Sunlight filters down to platform level.

== History ==
The station opened as part of the Toronto–York Spadina subway extension (TYSSE) on December 17, 2017. On November 27, 2009, the official groundbreaking ceremony was held for the extension and major tunnelling operations began in June 2011. The excavated station box was used to launch the tunnel boring machines north towards Highway 7 and south towards Steeles Avenue.

While Highway 407, along with the five other TYSSE stations, had a fare booth installed as per original station plans, the booth never housed collectors as the station was among the first eight to discontinue sales of legacy TTC fare media. Presto vending machines were available at the station's opening to sell Presto cards and to load funds or monthly passes onto them. On May 3, 2019, this station became one of the first ten stations to sell Presto tickets via Presto vending machines.

In 2018, Highway 407 station had the second-lowest usage of the six new stations along the extension, at 3,400 people per weekday. The lowest was 2,500 people per weekday at Downsview Park station, and the highest was 34,100 people per weekday at York University. However, after GO bus routes were changed to terminate at Highway 407 station instead of the York University campus, usage at Highway 407 station was expected to increase, as much of the ridership at this station comes from York University students and staff transferring from GO buses. Consequently in 2019, the station saw a surge in usage, with 13,956 people using it per weekday. However, as a result of the impact of the COVID-19 pandemic in Ontario, ridership dropped dramatically, and had yet to recover to 2019 levels by 2024, where numbers still stood at only 7,649.

== Fare zone ==
Despite being located outside Toronto in York Region, the station has always been within the Toronto TTC fare zone to avoid implementing a payment-on-exit system. This was the case even before the implementation of the One Fare program on February 26, 2024, which allows riders paying by Presto card, credit card, or debit card to transfer for free to and from regional buses serving the station. This was in contrast to TTC-contracted bus routes, when all riders were required to pay extra fare (either YRT or TTC) when crossing the municipal boundary at Steeles Avenue. At this station (as well as at the adjacent Vaughan Metropolitan Centre station) prior to the One Fare program, separate fares were charged for all transfers between the TTC subway and connecting regional buses, which are the only surface routes serving it.

Between January 2018 and March 2020, there was a $1.50 fare discount for GO bus riders transferring to or from the TTC subway if paying a single fare by Presto card.

== Highway 407 Bus Terminal ==
Hwy 407 Bus Terminal
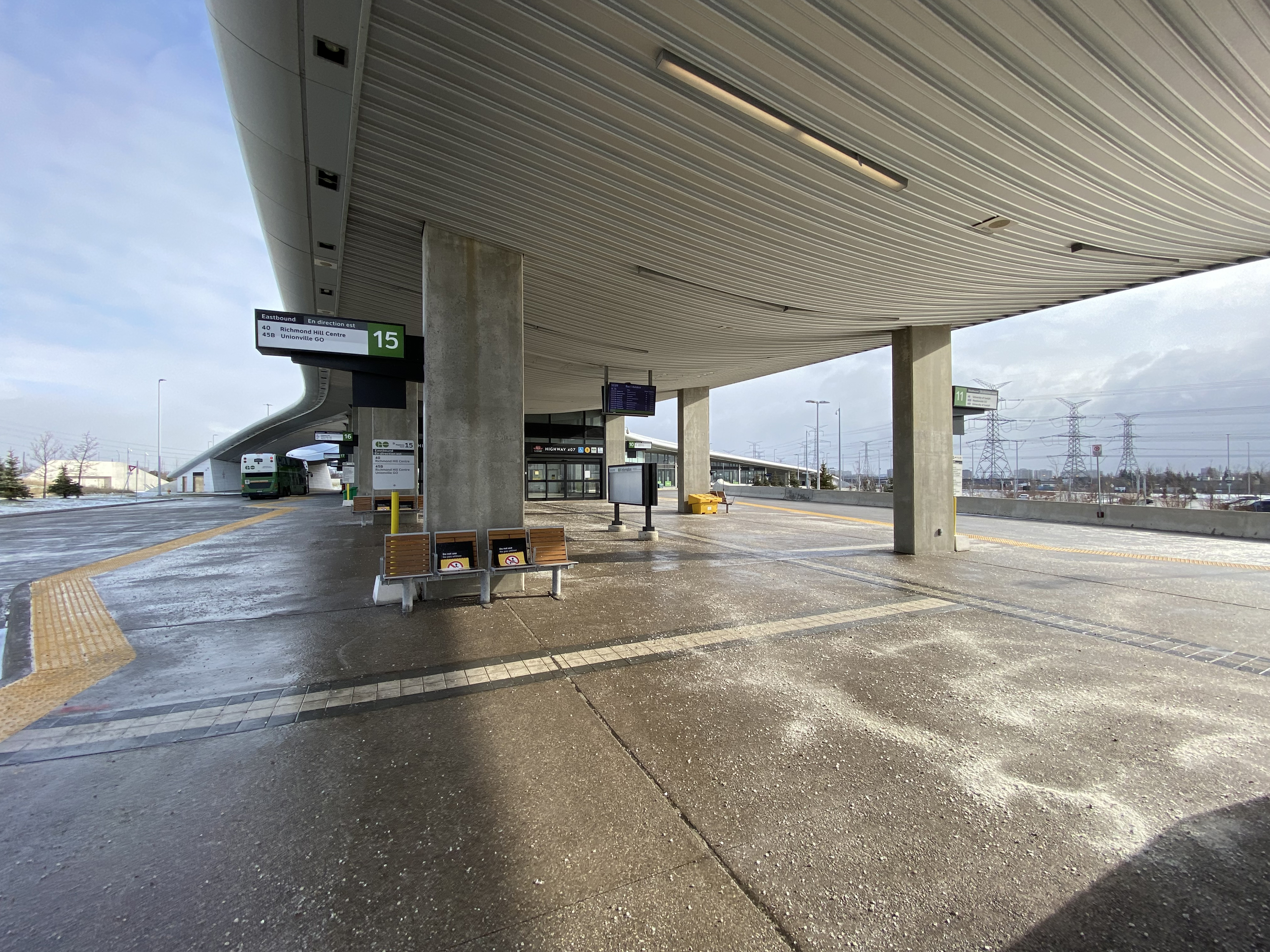

General information
- Owner: Metrolinx
- Bus routes: YRT buses: 20 Jane; 320 Jane Express; 361 Nashville Express; MP Mobility Plus (paratransit service); GO buses: 30 Kitchener; 40 Hamilton/Richmond Hill; 41 47 48 407 West; 52 56 407 East; Ontario Northland intercity coaches: 101 / 102 Toronto–North Bay; 201 / 202 Toronto–Sudbury
- Bus stands: 18
- Bus operators: York Region Transit; GO Transit; Ontario Northland

Construction
- Accessible: Yes

Other information
- Station code: GO Transit: 02674
- Fare zone: 19
- Website: Official station page

History
- Opened: December 30, 2017
Location

There are no connecting TTC buses at this station but the regional bus terminal (located within the station building but outside the TTC fare-paid area) serves YRT, GO Transit, and Ontario Northland bus routes. It is the only regional bus terminal serving a TTC subway station that is part of the main station building and is the largest bus terminal in the GO Transit system with 18 bays (5 for YRT and 13 for GO Transit) plus 17 layover bays. It includes a GO customer service counter, Presto and GO ticket vending machines, and washrooms.

Passengers using Presto, credit, or debit cards can transfer for free under the aforementioned One Fare program between the TTC and YRT buses, and receive a discounted fare for GO buses, with the province reimbursing each transit agency for lost revenue from the free or discounted transfers. As such card transfers need to be recorded for reimbursements, the bus terminal will remain outside the station's fare-paid area. This is also necessary to enforce double-fare payment for riders ineligible for free transfers.

YRT routes serving the terminal:

Route	Name	Additional information
20	Jane	Northbound to Teston Road via Vaughan Metropolitan Centre station, Vaughan Mills Terminal, and Major Mackenzie West Terminal; southbound to Pioneer Village station
320	Jane Express	Northbound to Major Mackenzie West Terminal via Vaughan Metropolitan Centre station and Vaughan Mills Terminal
361	Nashville Express	Northbound to Major Mackenzie Drive via Highways 407 and 427 (Rush hour service)
Mobility Plus

GO Transit routes serving the terminal:

Route	Name	Additional information
30	Kitchener	To University of Waterloo
40	Hamilton / Richmond Hill	Westbound to Hamilton GO Centre via Mississauga Transitway and Toronto Pearson International Airport; eastbound to Richmond Hill Centre
41	407 West	Westbound to Hamilton GO Centre; eastbound to Pickering GO Station; Weekdays only
41A	407 West	Westbound to Square One Bus Terminal; eastbound to Pickering GO Station; Weekdays only
47	407 West	To Hamilton GO Centre
47D	407 West	To Bramalea GO; Seasonal weekday express
48	407 West	To University of Guelph; Weekdays only
52	407 East	To Oshawa GO Station; Weekends only
56	407 East	Westbound to Oakville GO Station; eastbound to Oshawa GO Station; Weekdays only
56A	407 East	Westbound to Square One Bus Terminal; eastbound to Oshawa GO Station; Weekday express
56B	407 East	To Oakville GO Station; Weekdays only

Ontario Northland also serves the station with three daily trips on its Toronto–North Bay and Toronto–Sudbury routes.
