= Toronto–York Spadina subway extension =

2017 extension of Line 1 in Toronto, Canada

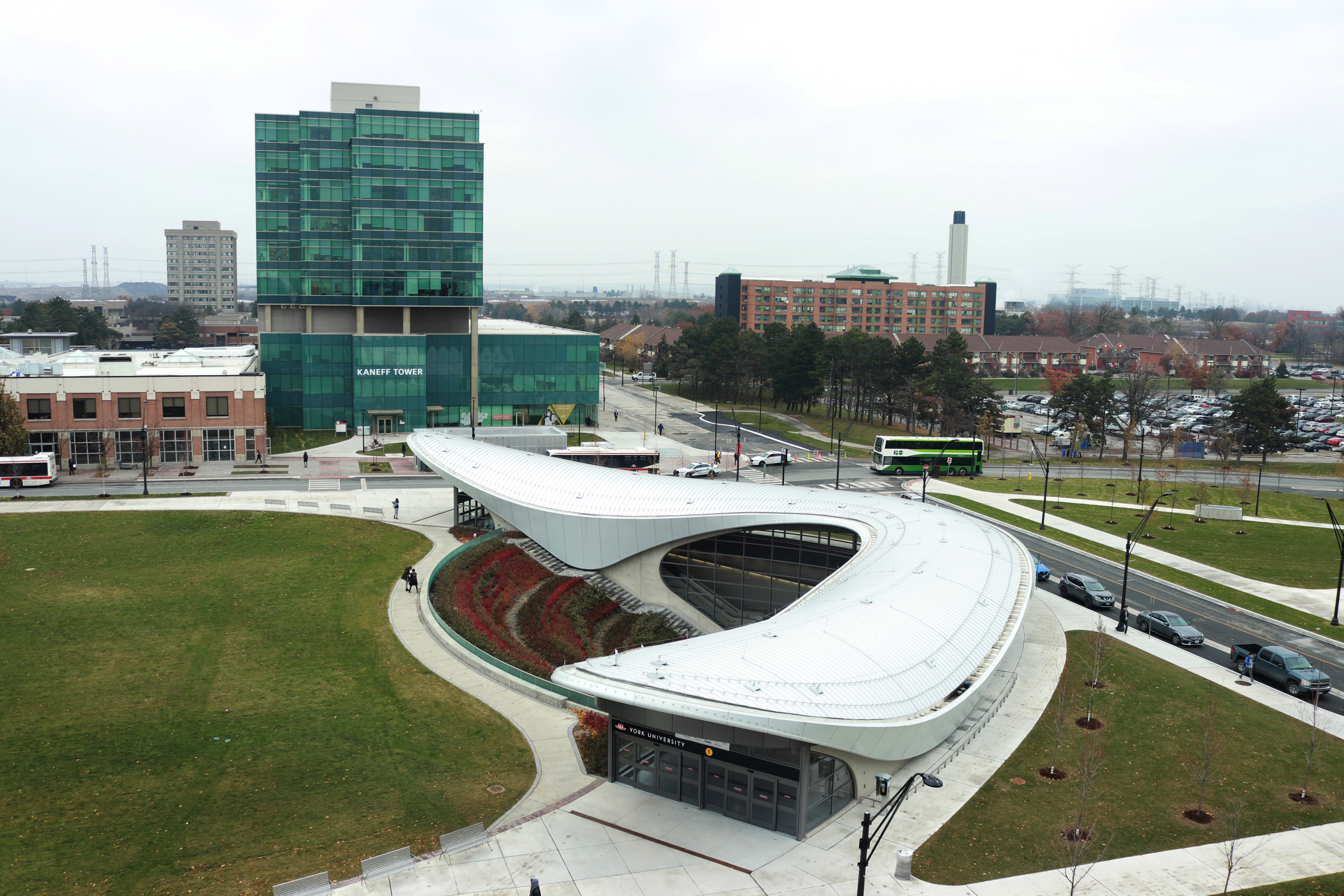
- York University station at the York University campus

Overview
- Status: Open
- Owner: City of Toronto
- Locale: Toronto and Vaughan, Ontario
- Stations: 6

Service
- Type: Rapid transit
- System: Toronto subway
- Operator: Toronto Transit Commission

History
- Opened: December 17, 2017; 8 years ago

Technical
- Line length: 8.6 km (5.3 mi)
- Character: Underground
- Track gauge: 4 ft 10 7/8 in (1,495 mm) Toronto gauge

The Toronto–York Spadina subway extension (TYSSE) is an extension of the Toronto subway's Line 1 Yonge–University which opened on December 17, 2017. It runs 8.6 kilometres (5.3 mi) northwest from the line's previous terminus at Sheppard West station serving six new stations and terminating at Vaughan Metropolitan Centre station near Highway 7 and Jane Street in Vaughan in York Region. The TYSSE was the first expansion of the Toronto subway system since the opening of Line 4 Sheppard in 2002 and the first to extend outside the modern limits of the City of Toronto.

The extension was first envisioned in the 1980s, though the route of an extension to York University was not finalized until 2005. Despite the lack of development there at the time, an extension to Vaughan was added and construction began in 2008. Initially expected to open in time for the 2015 Pan American Games, the extension went overbudget and opened two years after originally planned. The new stations were among the first to eliminate collector booths and Toronto Transit Commission (TTC) fares are charged at the Vaughan stations. Upon opening, most stations on the extension saw below average ridership compared to the rest of the subway system.

== Background ==
Schematic map of the TYSSE (orange), including the connection to Line 6 Finch West

Line 1 Yonge–University (initially running almost exclusively along Yonge Street) opened in 1954 and has been extended several times. The first section of the line's western branch dates back to 1963 when an extension, named the University Subway, was built to curve north from Union station below University Avenue and Queen's Park to near Bloor Street, where it turned west to terminate at St. George station at St. George and Bloor Streets. This extension opened on February 28 of that year. In 1978, a further eight-stop extension opened, called the Spadina subway, bringing the western leg to Wilson station in North York (then a borough separate from Toronto) primarily along Allen Road.

=== Yonge–Spadina loop plans ===
After the line reached Wilson, there were several proposals to extend it farther. An extension into Vaughan had been suggested as early as 1988, when Vaughan mayor Lorna Jackson campaigned during the Vaughan municipal elections to extend the line to the proposed Highway 407 corridor. In 1989, a proposal was put forward as part of the Network 2011 plan to construct a loop to join the Spadina and Yonge branches along the hydro corridor north of Finch Avenue to Finch station, the northern terminus of the Yonge branch, which opened in 1974 when it was extended north from Eglinton. However, officials from York University and York Region lobbied for the loop to run through the university campus and along Steeles Avenue instead as they felt it would better suit commuters. In the early 1990s, the loop plan, known as the Yonge–Spadina Subway Loop Project, was discussed, with the option through York's campus being favoured. The western leg of the line would have been extended by four stations to York University in the first phase of the project while the portion east along Steeles Avenue and back south down Yonge Street to Finch station to close the loop would have been built in later phases.

In 1992, as an interim project, construction began on a 2-kilometre (1.2 mi) one-stop extension to Downsview station (renamed Sheppard West in May 2017), which opened in 1996. In 1994, an environmental assessment for the next phase of the loop project was completed, but that extension was not built due to lack of funding. Despite this, lobbying by politicians to extend the line continued.

=== Change of plans to an extension to Vaughan ===
In 2000, the City of Vaughan again lobbied for a subway extension to their municipality as they planned to build a new city core (today's Vaughan Metropolitan Centre at Highway 7 and Jane Street, 2 kilometres (1.2 mi) north of Steeles Avenue. This second lobbying effort was ultimately successful and led to the abandonment of the loop proposal. During the proposal stage of this plan, the TTC had concluded there were insufficient projected population densities to justify the line north of Steeles Avenue, with some of the new stations projected to be among those with the lowest ridership of the subway system. The preferred alignment and placement for four stations for the extension beyond Downsview station to Steeles (one station farther than what was planned in 1994) via York University were finalized in September 2005. In March 2006, the provincial government announced $670 million in funding for the extension, with the caveat that the line would also be extended to serve the future Vaughan Metropolitan Centre. At the time, the area around the mostly vacant Vaughan Metropolitan Centre site was occupied by big-box stores and freeways, and lacked the dense development that surrounds most other subway stations. The preferred alignment and placement for the two stations in York Region was finalized in 2008.

The TTC board approved design principles for stations in 2006, before approving a station design philosophy in 2009. This included integrated design by architects, public art and stations to meet Toronto Green Standards. Consultations on the detailed design of stations took place in 2009 and 2010.

Greg Sorbara, former deputy premier of Ontario and finance minister, was a key promoter of the TYSSE to York University and into York Region, in which his riding was based. In his memoirs, he said that "it would not only be great for the people in the region, but also for my political prospects". In 2015, Sorbara indicated that, while David Miller was mayor of Toronto, Miller was initially not enthusiastic about the extension. Sorbara said, "He should have been thrilled at the prospect of the province providing $670 million for more subway infrastructure, regardless of where it went."

=== Temporary busway ===
In 2003, a temporary busway was planned between Downsview (now Sheppard West) station and the campus, but was opposed by the university, which felt it would lessen government willingness to extend the subway. After numerous delays, construction on the York University Busway started on July 25, 2008, with a short section of the busway opened on September 6, 2009 and the remainder opened on November 20, 2009.

== Construction ==
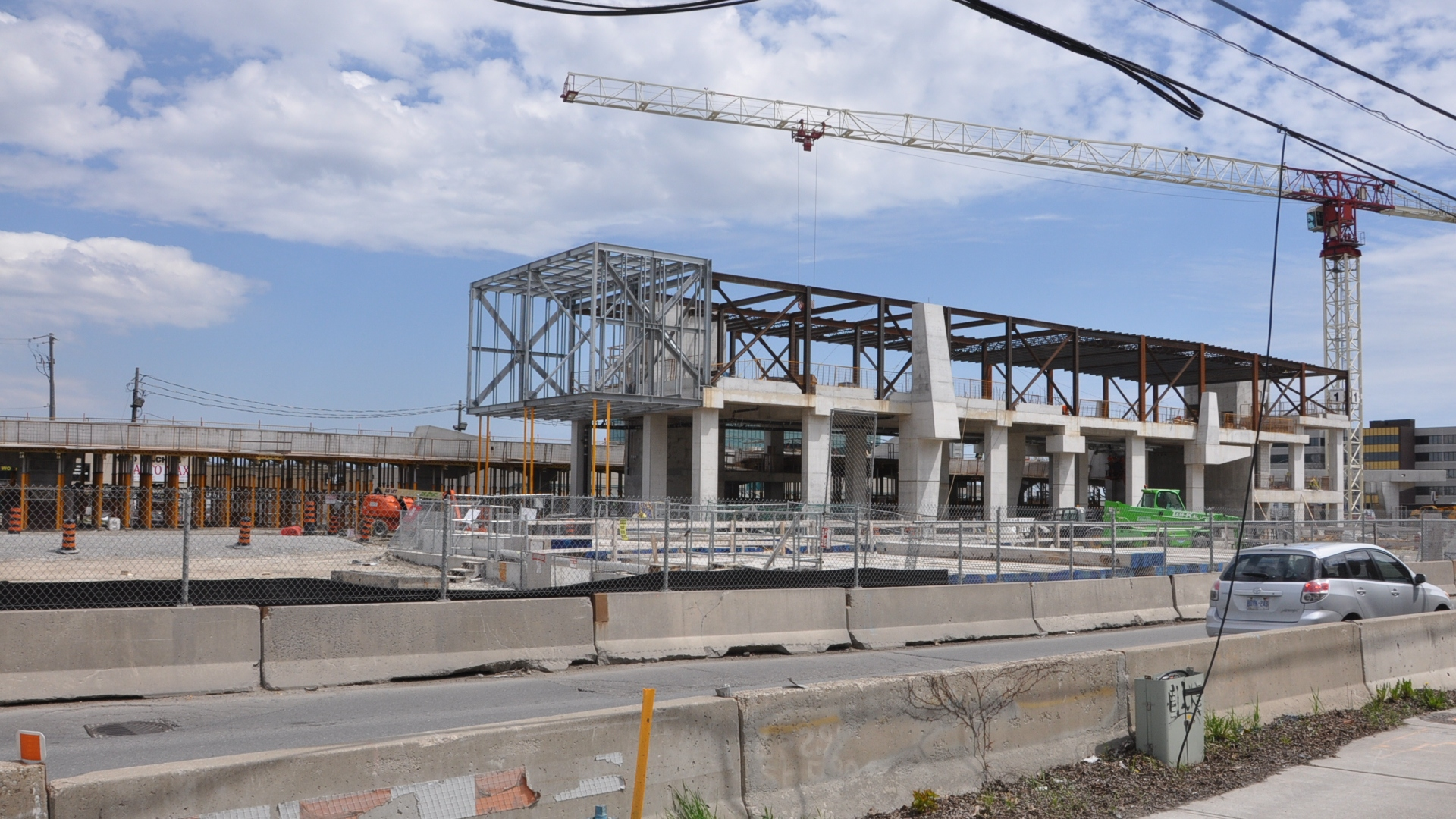
Finch West station under construction in 2016

The estimated cost was $2.09 billion in 2006, which have been escalated to $2.63 billion considering costs at the year of occurrence. The Province of Ontario deposited $870 million into the Move Ontario Trust. The federal government committed $697 million. The City of Toronto and York Region committed to fund one-third of total project costs, with Toronto contributing $526 million and York Region contributing $352 million.

The first construction contract was awarded on February 27, 2008. Construction commenced in July 2008 with the relocation of sewers. The official ground breaking ceremony was held on November 27, 2009, with a planned opening date of 2015. The TTC purchased two tunnel boring machines (TBMs) in late 2010 from LOVAT Inc. (since acquired by Caterpillar Inc.) for $58.4 million to dig tunnels for the extension, with two more being delivered in early 2011. Tunnelling work was divided into two sections split at the Finch West station site, with two TBMs nicknamed Holey and Moley boring the southern section, and the other two, nicknamed Yorkie and Torkie, boring the northern. Tunnelling began with Holey boring from a launch shaft at the Downsview Park station site on June 17, 2011, and was completed on November 8, 2013, when Torkie broke through the wall of the excavated Vaughan Metropolitan Centre station box. Roughly 1,400,000 cubic metres (49,000,000 cu ft) of material had been excavated, with over 54,000 concrete tunnel segments installed.

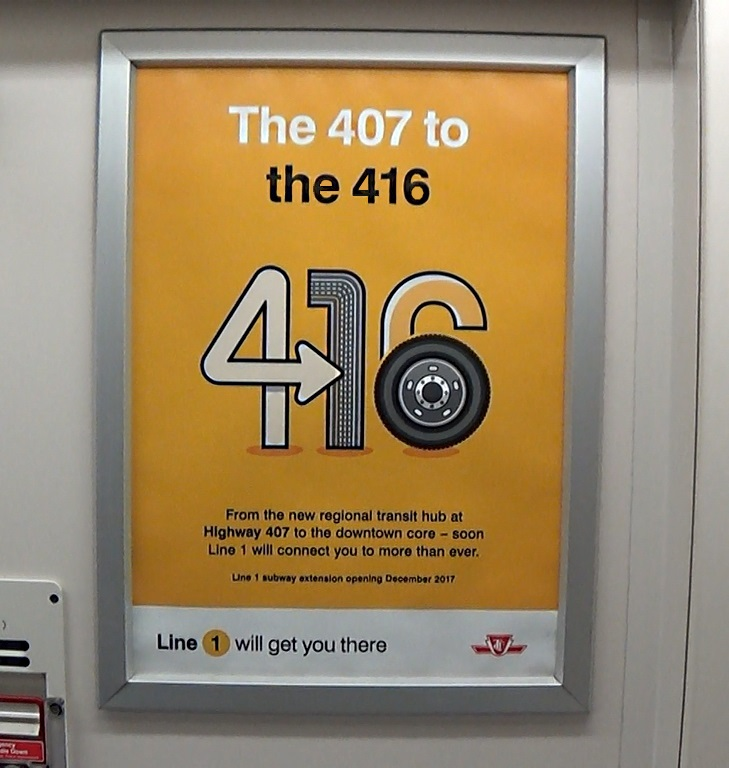
Advertisement from September 2017 announcing the extension's December opening referencing Highway 407 and area code 416, referring to Toronto proper

In November 2014, the TTC indicated that the 2016 opening date would likely be missed, following poor performance by some contractors, death of a worker at the York University station site and harsh winter weather. In March 2015, TTC CEO Andy Byford announced that the project was over budget, and that project management problems had resulted in the dismissal of two TTC managers. Toronto City Council approved an additional $150 million in funding, with $90 million from Toronto and $60 million from York Region. The TTC subsequently signed a contract with Bechtel, worth up to $80 million, to assume management of the last third of the construction. This bypassed the tendering process usually used to hire contractors. The extension would open two years later than originally planned, in 2017. In January 2016, it was announced that the project was $400 million over budget, to a total cost of $3.2 billion.

In June 2016, trackwork was completed, with a ceremony attended by Premier of Ontario Kathleen Wynne and other dignitaries. In spring 2017, the third rail which provides power to trains was turned on for the first time, with the first test train running on the extension in April. In May 2017, Downsview station was renamed Sheppard West in preparation for the opening of the new Downsview Park station. In September 2017, Byford announced that the extension would open for revenue service in December 2017, with the TTC running "ghost trains" (continuing from revenue service runs) along the unopened extension to test it from November.

The extension opened on December 17, 2017, with an opening ceremony attended by Prime Minister of Canada Justin Trudeau, Premier of Ontario Kathleen Wynne and Mayor of Toronto John Tory.

== Connecting infrastructure ==
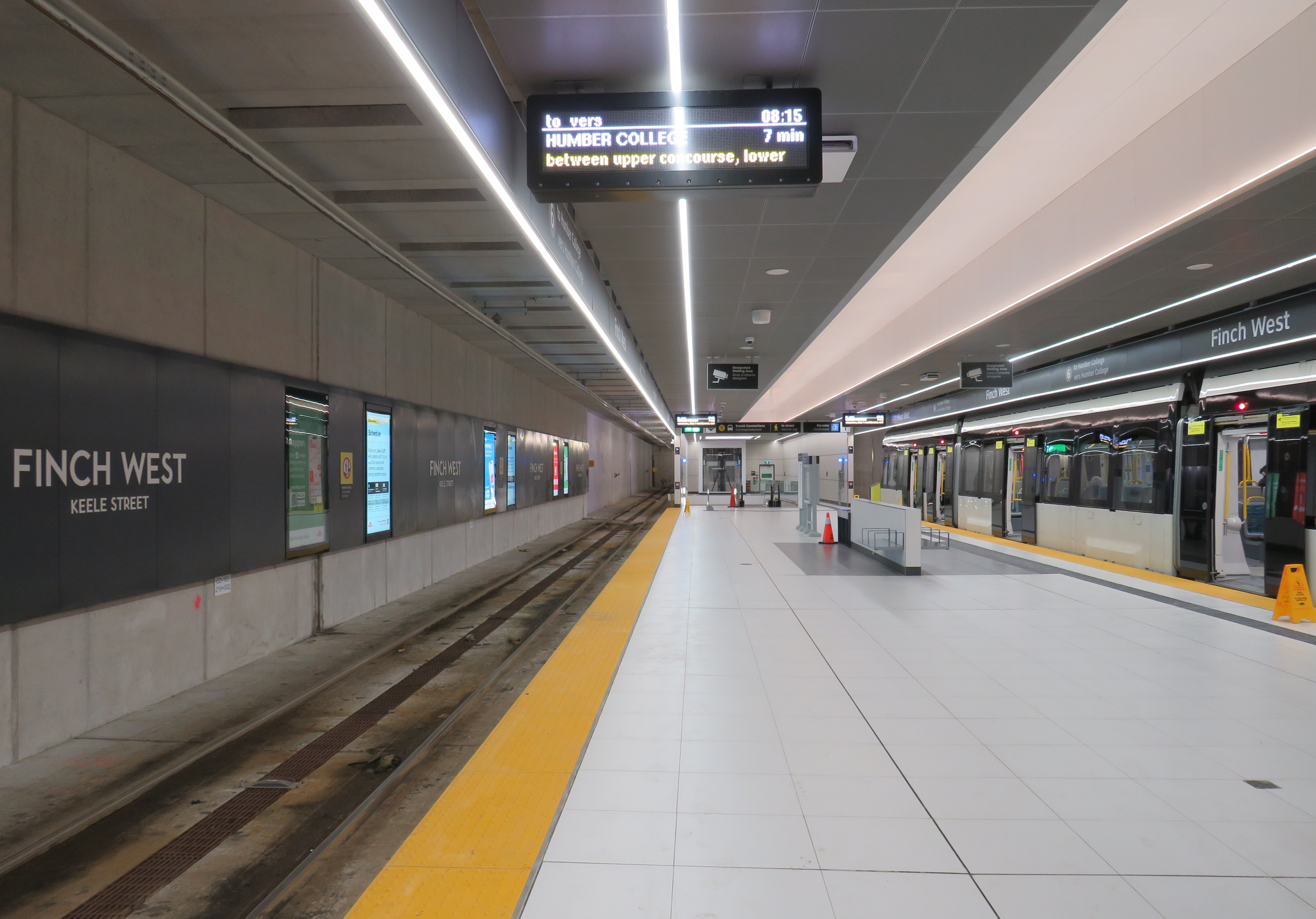
Alstom Citadis train at the Line 6 Finch West platform at Finch West station

In addition to the subway line, other transit infrastructure was built as part of the TYSSE project. Downsview Park station is an interchange between the subway and the Barrie line, a commuter rail line in the GO Transit system. The station is fully integrated between the two modes. Integrated TTC fare-paid bus terminals typical of many existing stations were built at Finch West and Pioneer Village stations, and York Region Transit (YRT) bus terminals were constructed at Pioneer Village and Vaughan Metropolitan Centre; however, these are located outside of the fare-paid areas, adjacent to but outside the stations. A GO Transit bus terminal (also used by YRT buses and Ontario Northland intercity coaches) was built at Highway 407 station, again outside the paid area, but within the main station building. This station was also designed to connect with the proposed future 407 Transitway.

Finch West was built with a knock-out panel that would allow for easier future construction of the connection to Line 6 Finch West, which was then being planned. Construction of this light rail line began in 2019, and it opened on December 7, 2025.

Vaughan Metropolitan Centre is also an interchange between the subway and the Highway 7 Rapidway, used by YRT's Viva and Brampton Transit's Züm services. The bus rapid transit dedicated on-street right-of-way opened in conjunction with the subway, and there is direct escalator and elevator access connecting the station concourse with the covered rapidway stop.

Paid commuter parking lots were built at Finch West (358 spaces), Pioneer Village (1,950 spaces) and Highway 407 (560 spaces) – parking was initially free until April 2018 as ridership grew on the line. Passenger pick-up and drop-off facilities were also built at Finch West (10 spaces), Pioneer Village (11 spaces) and Highway 407 (30 spaces). These are owned by the TTC and operated by the Toronto Parking Authority. At Vaughan Metropolitan Centre, SmartCentres built a 900-space parking lot.

== Fares ==
=== Fare policy within Vaughan ===
Although Highway 407 and Vaughan Metropolitan Centre stations are located in Vaughan (within the YRT service area), a TTC fare is required to ride the subway to or from these stations as is the case with stations within or bordering Toronto. There are free transfers between the TTC and YRT or Brampton Transit and discounted transfers with fare-by-distance GO Transit for customers paying by Presto cards or credit or debit cards. However, double fares are charged for riders paying with cash if transferring between the TTC and suburban regional buses and do not receive a discount with GO Transit.

==== Before fare integration ====
Prior to February 26, 2024, when the fare integration policy – dubbed the "One Fare program" – was implemented for electronic payment, all riders were charged a second (either TTC or suburban system) fare when transferring between systems and did not receive a discount when using GO Transit. However, to simplify fare collection, only TTC fares were charged to simply enter or exit the stations in Vaughan.

This practice was in contrast to TTC-operated bus routes that cross the Toronto–York boundary at Steeles Avenue, where a second fare was (and still is for cash) charged when boarding or alighting if crossing the boundary.

=== Collector and legacy fare media phase-out ===
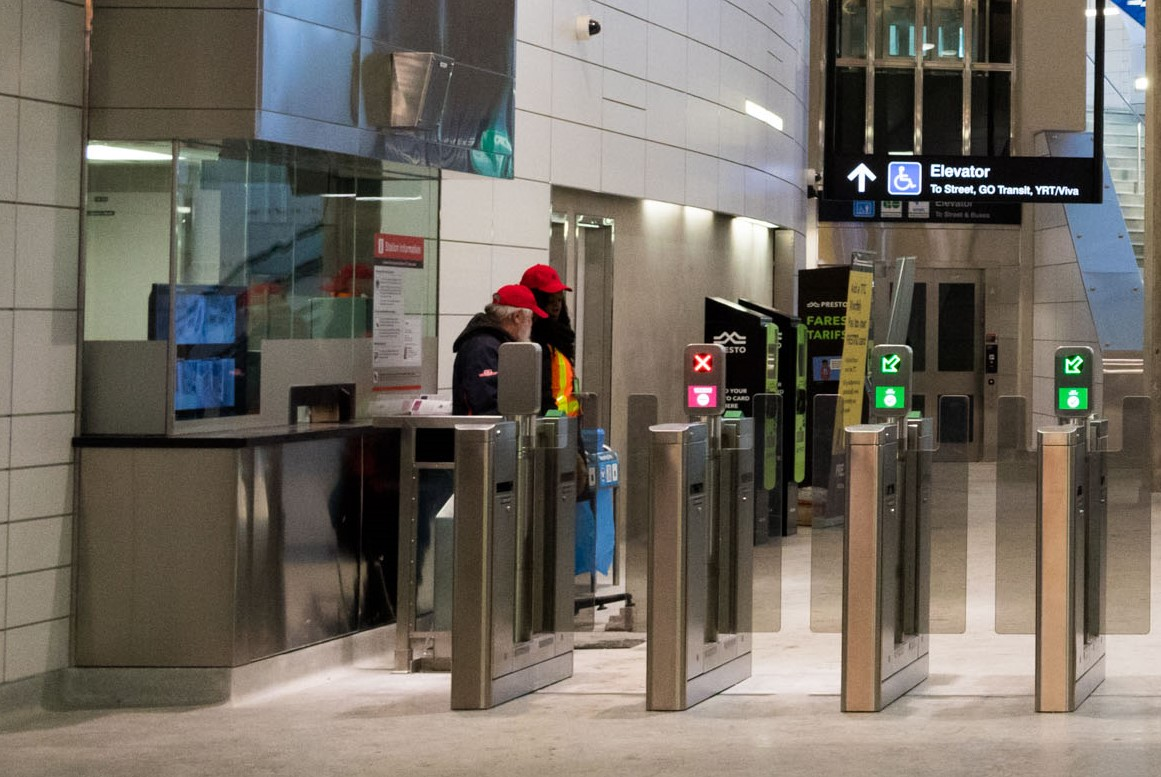
A booth at Highway 407 station originally designed for fare collectors. Customer service attendants are stationed to its right.

The TYSSE stations were among the first to eliminate staffed fare collector booths, along with the sales of TTC's legacy fare media products – such as tokens – in favour of the Presto card. As a result, these stations opened with roaming customer service attendants, although booths had been installed per station plans. Collector-booth closures at more stations along the west branch of the line, moving south from the TYSSE stations, followed later.

== Public art and architecture ==
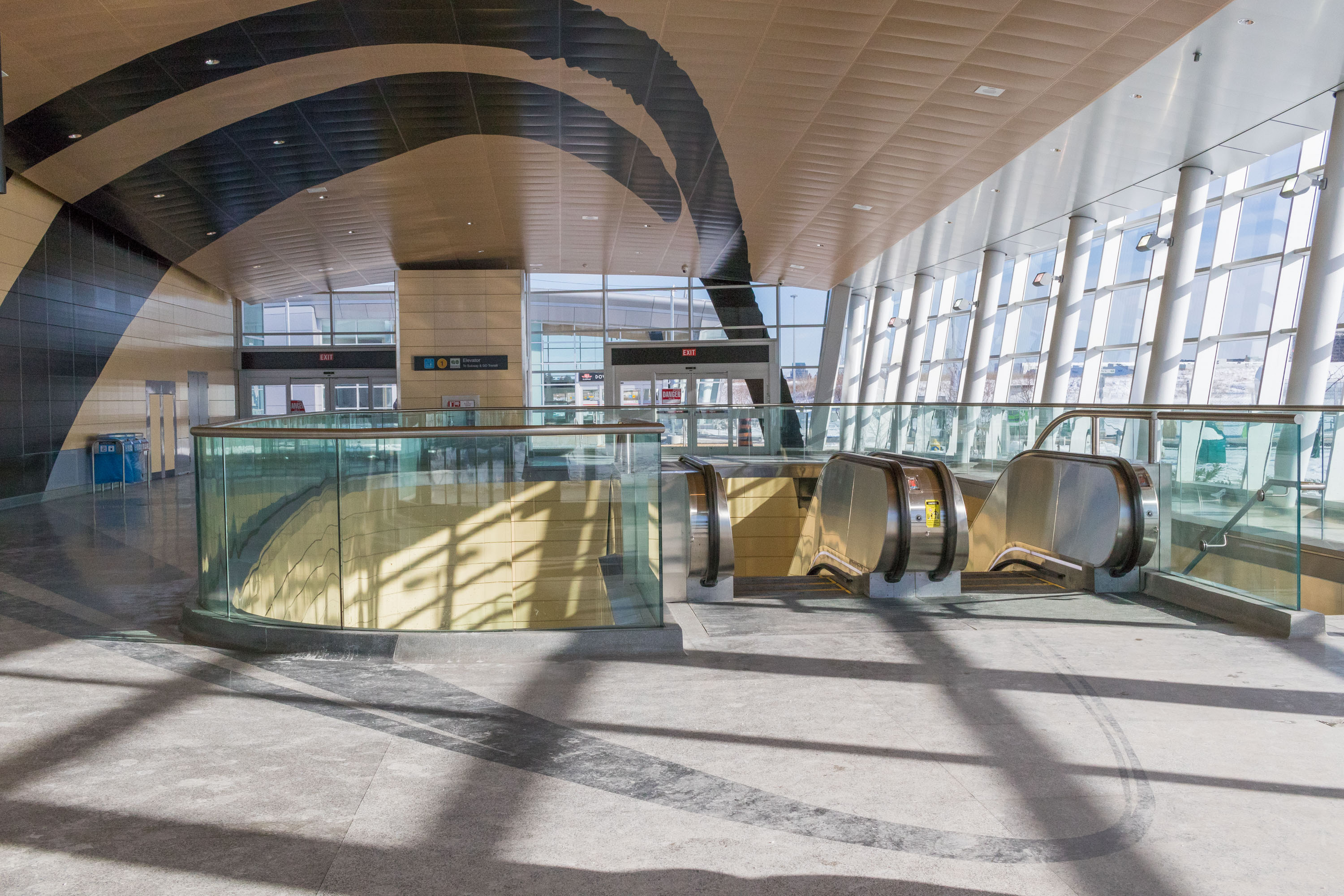
Spin by Panya Clark Espinal at Downsview Park station

Stations on the extension (in keeping with the pattern of the original Spadina line) feature distinct station architecture and public art. TTC and City policy requires one percent of the budget to be spent on public art. However, the platform walls have no tiles or other cladding and are simply bare concrete, though structural elements on the platforms themselves are clad, as is the case with much of the Line 4 Sheppard stations. The interactive artwork at Pioneer Village, LightSpell, has not been turned on due to concerns about displaying profanity and insults, which would violate the 2009 revision of the TTC's by-law that explicitly prohibits the use of profanity.

| Station | Architect | Public art |
|---|---|---|
| Downsview Park | Aedas | Spin by Panya Clark Espinal |
| Finch West | Spadina Group Associates – All Design (architect Will Alsop) and IBI Group | Bruce McLean |
| York University | Foster + Partners | Piston Effect by Jason Bruges Studio |
| Pioneer Village | Spadina Group Associates – All Design (architect Will Alsop) and IBI Group | LightSpell by Tim Edler and Jan Edler |
| Highway 407 | Aedas | Sky Ellipse by David Pearl |
| Vaughan Metropolitan Centre | Grimshaw Architects | Atmospheric Lens by Paul Raff Studio |

== Operating costs ==
According to a TTC forecast reported by transit advocate Steve Munro in early 2015, the TTC's annual operating costs for the entire TYSSE would be $33.7 million, or $14.2 million net of revenue. This would produce a 58 percent cost recovery compared to 70 percent for the TTC system as a whole. These costs, including those for the portion in Vaughan, will be covered by the TTC and the City of Toronto. In 2016, the expected net cost to run the extension was revised to $30 million.

According to a 2008 memorandum of understanding between York Region and the City of Toronto published by the TTC:

The TTC will be responsible for the full operating costs of the Spadina subway extension from Downsview (renamed Sheppard West in May 2017) to the Vaughan Corporate Centre (renamed Vaughan Metropolitan Centre) and receive all revenue from the Project (passenger revenue, commuter parking, advertising, retail leasing), with the exception of the operating costs and revenues for bus terminals and passenger pickup and drop off facilities located within York Region, which shall be maintained and operated by York Region.

== Early ridership numbers ==
Early statistics published by CBC News report ridership numbers for three of six new stations on the TYSSE. In total, "57,100 riders boarded trains at the new stations during a week of service in May [2018]." Finch West station pulled the most riders for the month, with approximately 17,000 customers using the station daily (for comparison, Lansdowne station on Line 2 Bloor–Danforth has similar usage). It is worth noting that these numbers were recorded during York University's strike, leading to fewer passengers at Pioneer Village and York University stations. Downsview Park and Highway 407, despite both having direct connections to GO Transit, saw some of the worst ridership numbers in the entire subway system, with 2,000 daily customers at Downsview Park and 2,900 at Highway 407. For a time after the opening of the extension, Downsview Park replaced Bessarion on Line 4 as the least used subway station on the TTC.

Statistics for 2018 showed that ridership at Downsview Park had increased to 2,500 customers per day and Highway 407 had increased to 3,400. The busiest station on the extension was then York University, which had about 38,000 daily customers. By 2019, ridership at Highway 407 had increased dramatically to over 13,000 after GO Transit stopped serving the York University campus and moved their bus connections there. Finch West and Pioneer Village both saw approximately 17,000 customers and the terminus, Vaughan Metropolitan Centre, had a daily usage of 14,800. Since the average daily usage of all TTC subway stations was a little more than 34,000 at the time, aside from York University station, all stations along the extension still saw below average usage two years after opening.

TTC ridership information from 2023 to 2024 showed that the average number of boardings per day was 5,600 at Downsview Park and 7,600 at Highway 407. This was approximately double compared to 2018 but still well below the subway system average. Ridership at the other four stations on the extension ranged between 16,600 and 20,400, which was near the system median of 19,700. However, as a result of the impact of the COVID-19 pandemic and further regional bus route changes, ridership numbers mostly declined or shifted, and the system median itself dropped significantly from 2019.

Ridership numbers at Highway 407 dropped from a height of over 13,000 in 2019 back down to 7,600, with York University having an even greater drop to about 20,000, down 18,000 from its 2018 peak of 38,000. By 2024, the busiest stations on the extension were York University and Vaughan Metropolitan Centre, with around 20,400 daily riders each.

== Extension criticism ==
The extension north of Steeles Avenue was criticized for several reasons. As a precedent, the Sheppard subway had shown that while a subway may spur development, that development may not result in high subway ridership. The Toronto Star stated that commuter destinations may be scattered throughout the Greater Toronto Area where public transit is inconvenient to use.

Outgoing TTC CEO Andy Byford said: "People say '[build] there and they will come.' I think the most pressing need is to now focus on subway expansion where it's not so much that they will come, it's [that] there's already a demonstrable need." However, Globe and Mail columnists wrote in the context of the TYSSE: "But that advice will have to compete with the growing power of the suburbs, and the eagerness of Queen's Park to court them." Toronto city councillor and TTC commissioner Glenn De Baeremaeker said: "Whether [the subway], quote, merits on a technical sense, the ridership or not, it's a philosophical decision the city has made and society has made. People like subways."

== Development ==
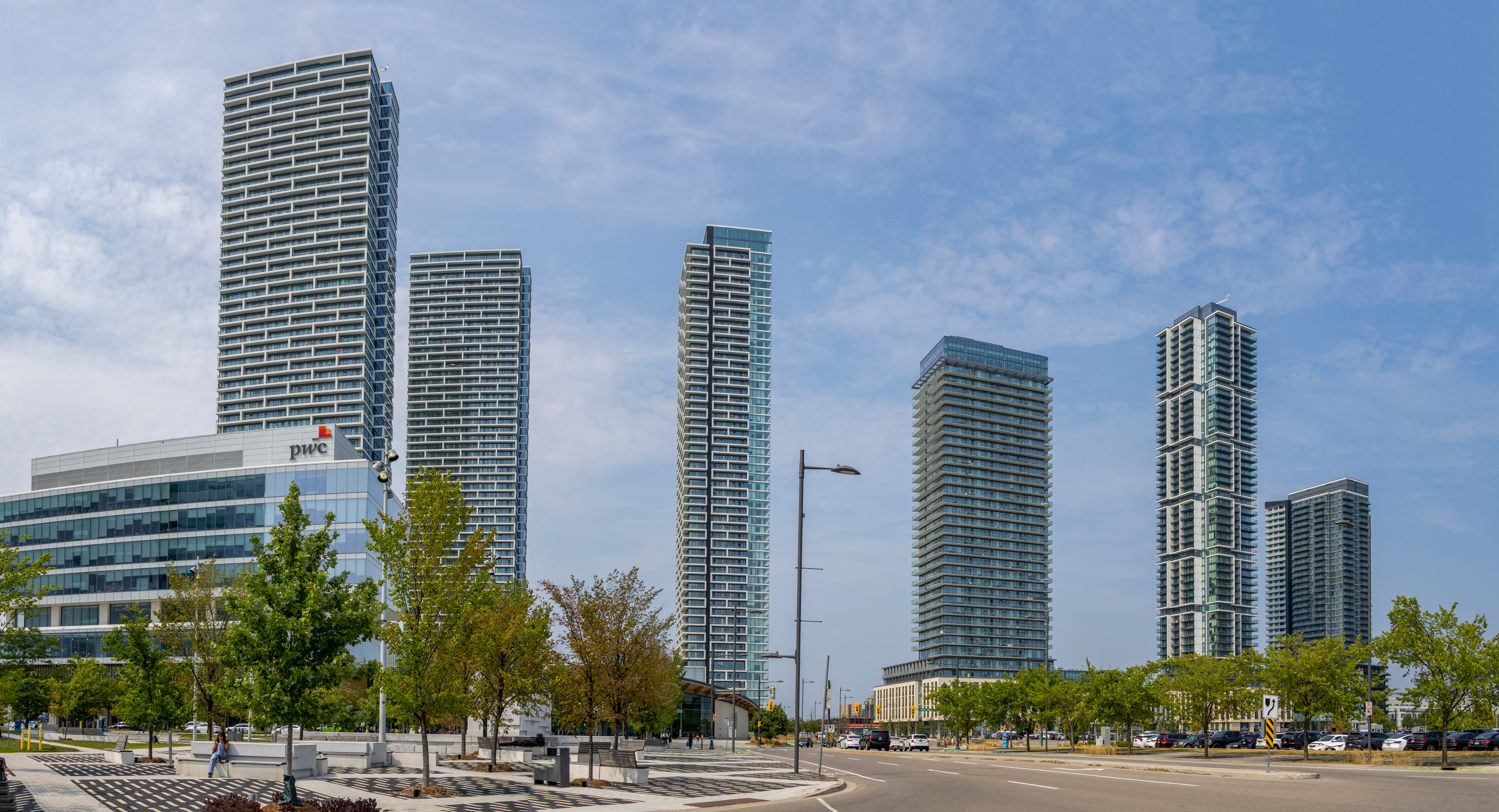
Vaughan Metropolitan Centre

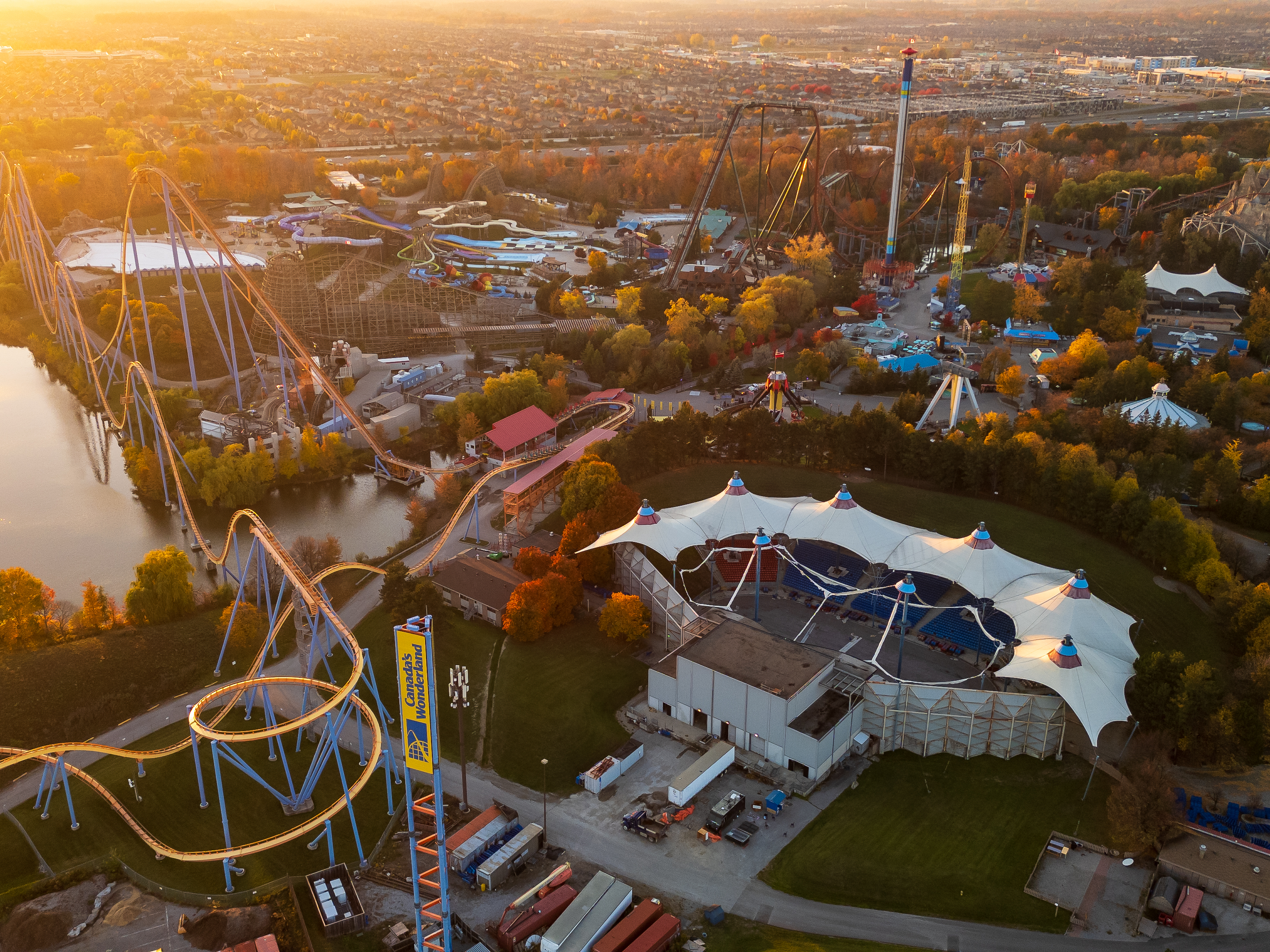
A future farther extension of the west branch of Line 1 could serve Canada's Wonderland, a major regional amusement park, on Jane Street just south of Major Mackenzie Drive.

The TYSSE has spurred the development of Vaughan's transit-oriented city centre at Vaughan Metropolitan Centre. Vaughan Councillor Alan Shefman stated in 2016 that the new city centre will eventually create the density to justify a subway. To this end, Vaughan Mayor Maurizio Bevilacqua worked with a developer to build several high-rise buildings near Vaughan Metropolitan Centre station; however, when the extension opened in 2017, the area still mainly consisted of the aforementioned low-density uses and vacant land. By 2023, however, several high-density condominium towers had been completed in the area, such as CG Tower and Festival Condominiums, the two tallest buildings in Vaughan.

== Future ==
York Region, in their 2022 Transportation Master Plan, proposed further extensions of Line 1 on both the University and Yonge branches. The University proposal was to extend Line 1 along Jane Street from Vaughan Metropolitan Centre station north to Major Mackenzie Drive (adjacent to the Cortellucci Vaughan Hospital and just north of Canada's Wonderland amusement park), with possible intermediate stations at Langstaff Road and Rutherford Road (adjacent to Vaughan Mills shopping centre). Jane Street in York Region is served by YRT bus routes 20 Jane and 320 Jane Express.

As of July 2024, these plans are not funded and are forecast for implementation in 2051 at the earliest. The York Region Rapid Transit Corporation endorsed these plans in their long-term rapid transit system map.
