= Pioneer Village station =

Toronto subway station

Pioneer Village
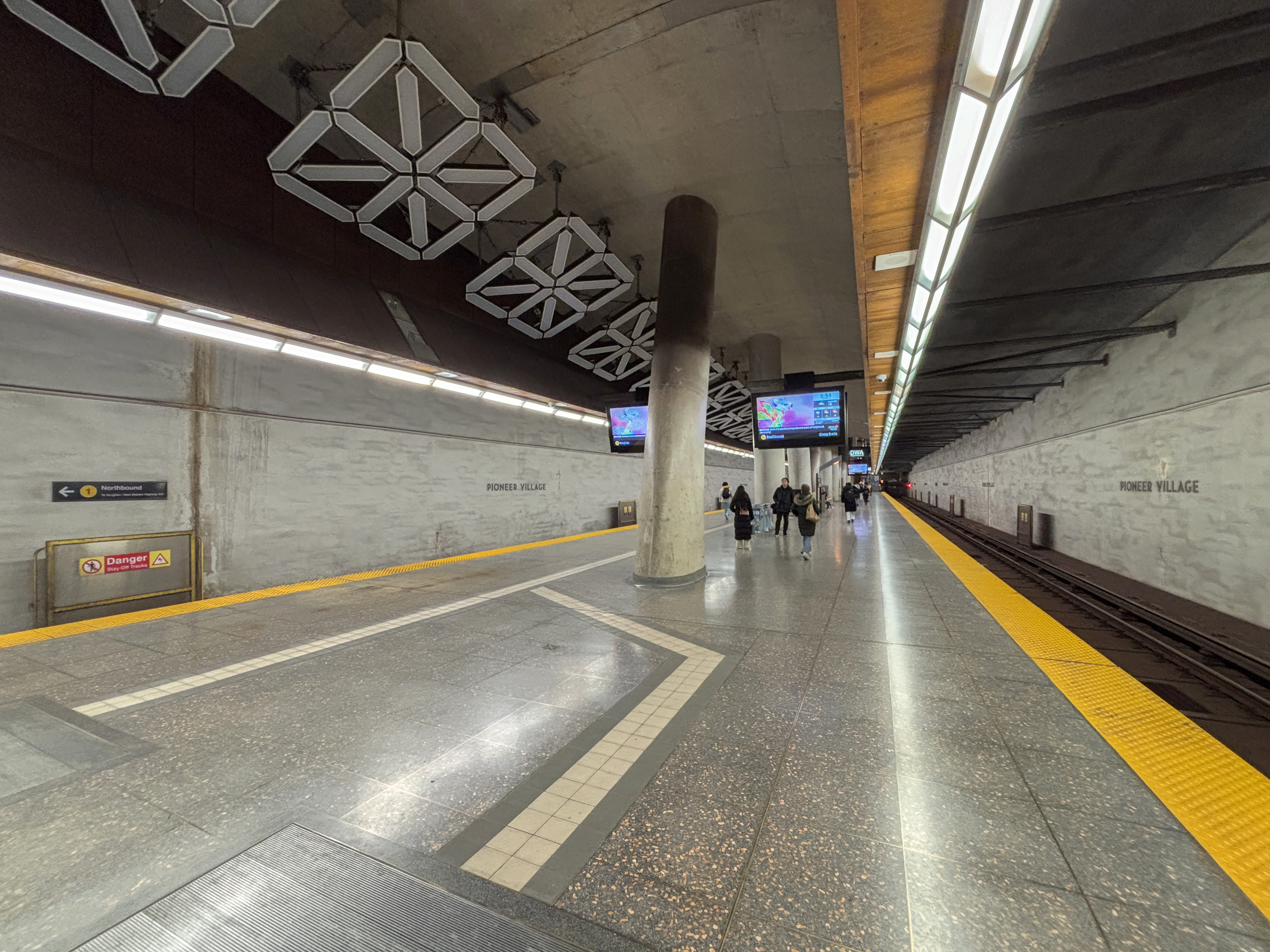

General information
- Location: 185 Northwest Gate, Toronto, Ontario; Canada
- Coordinates: 43°46′37″N 79°30′33″W
- Platforms: Centre platform
- Tracks: 2
- Connections: TTC buses: 35 Jane; 41 Keele; 60 Steeles West; 84D Sheppard West; 106 Sentinel; 108 Driftwood; 166 Toryork; 335 Jane; 341 Keele; 353 Steeles; 935 Jane Express; 960 Steeles West Express; Pioneer Village Terminal

Construction
- Structure type: Underground
- Parking: 1,881 spaces
- Accessible: Yes
- Architect: Spadina Group Associates (All Design and IBI Group)
- Architectural style: Postmodern architecture

Other information
- Website: Official station page

History
- Opened: December 17, 2017; 8 years ago

Passengers
- 2023–2024: 16,570
- Rank: 45 of 70

Services
Preceding station	Toronto Transit Commission	Following station
Highway 407 towards Vaughan	Line 1 Yonge–University	York University towards Finch
Location

Pioneer Village is a subway station on the Line 1 Yonge–University of the Toronto subway. It is located under the intersection of Northwest Gate and Steeles Avenue, at the city boundaries of Toronto and Vaughan, Ontario, Canada. A Toronto Transit Commission (TTC) bus terminal is connected to the southern portion of the station, and there is a regional bus terminal, the Pioneer Village Terminal, for connecting to York Region Transit (YRT) buses on the north side of Steeles Avenue. Pioneer Village, Highway 407, and Vaughan Metropolitan Centre are the first Toronto subway stations fully or partially located outside the Toronto city limits since its last amalgamation in 1998.

== Description ==
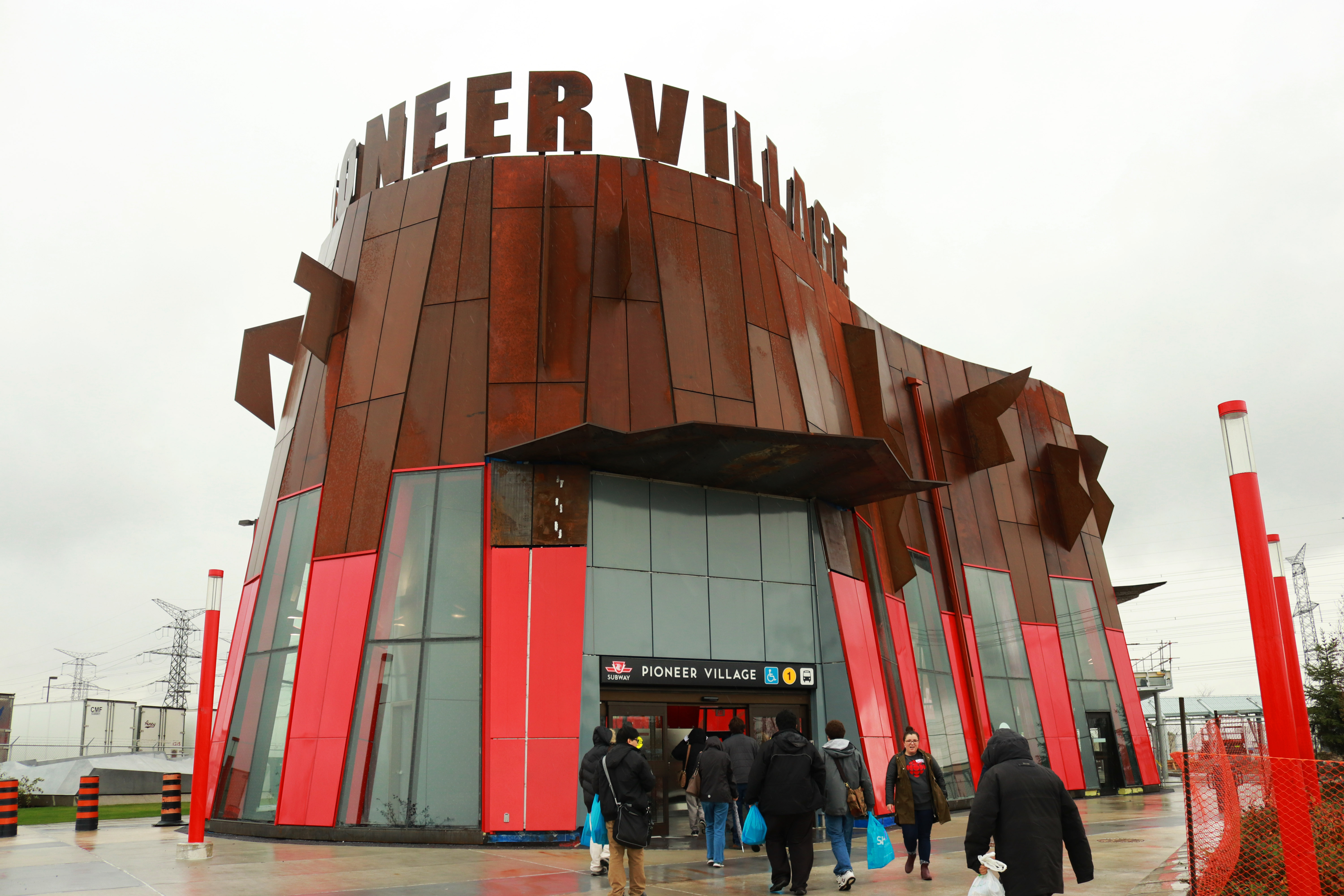
North entrance to station

The station lies on a northwest–southeast axis, with the line approaching the station from York University station northwestward, directly under the university's main buildings. The northern portion of the station lies in the City of Vaughan in York Region and the southern portion in the City of Toronto. There are three station entrances, two being structures that are situated on both the north and south sides of Steeles Avenue. One of two south entrances (in Toronto) connects to the fare-paid TTC bus terminal. with 12 bays. The other is incorporated into the bus terminal itself and is accessed via a signalized crosswalk across the bus driveways from the university's sports facilities. The third—the north entrance in Vaughan—is adjacent to the York Region Transit bus terminal as well as an on-street passenger pick-up and drop-off area. A large commuter lot with a 1,881-vehicle capacity is situated in the hydro corridor to the north of the YRT terminal. Unusually, both street entrances lead to separate mezzanine levels, despite both serving as primary points of access (although many stations have secondary automatic entrances), and it is necessary for non-subway riders transferring between TTC and YRT buses to go down to and walk the length of the platform to connect between the two bus terminals.

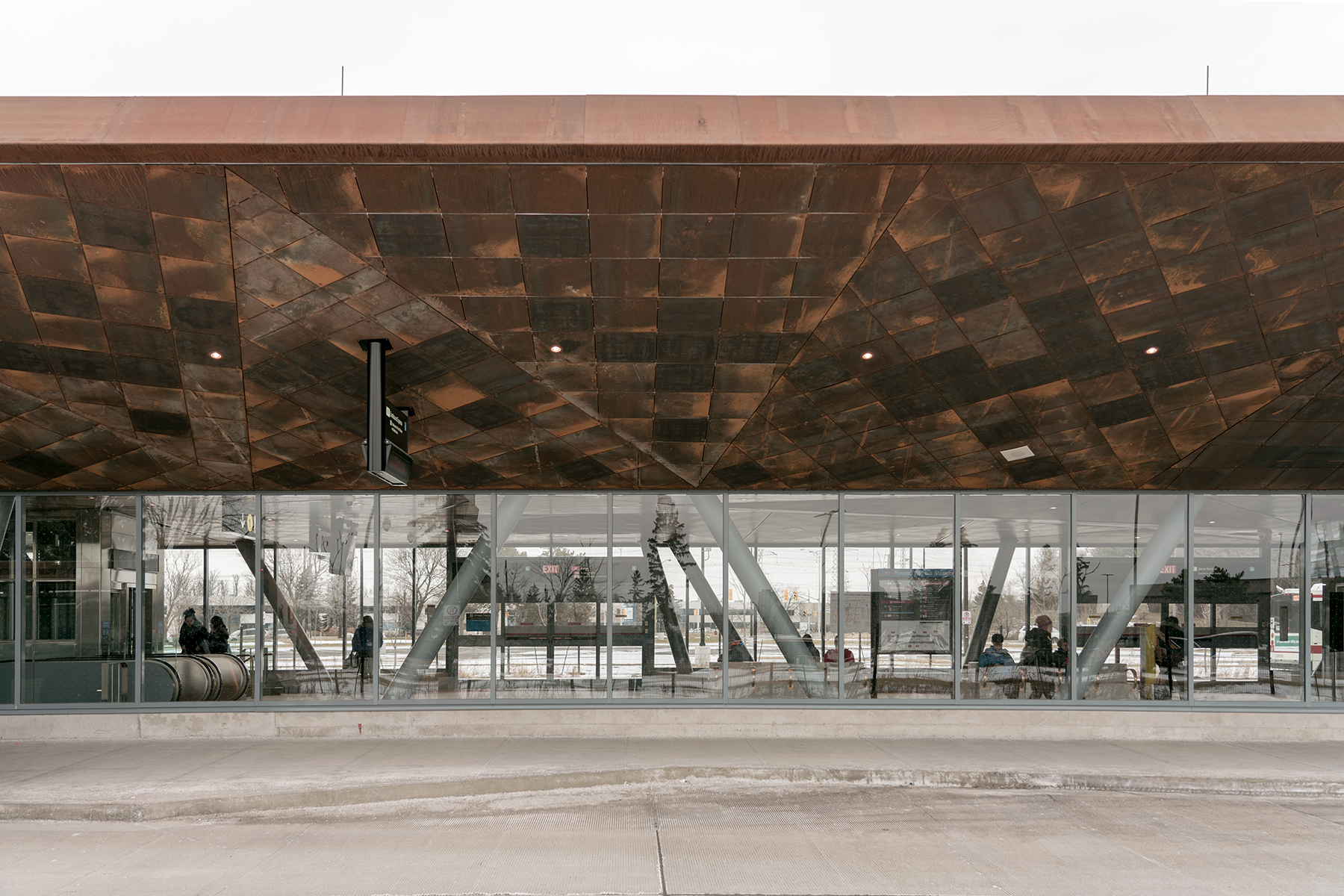
TTC bus terminal

The station has three levels: the entrances at street level, the two mezzanines just below them, and the train platform at the bottom. Enough space has been left between the surface and the platform to allow for the construction of an underground station for a future light rail transit line.

The station was designed by a consortium of architects and engineers, Spadina Group Associates – including All Design (headed by British architect Will Alsop) and IBI Group. Landscape design of the station was by Janet Rosenberg & Studio. The station features entrance structures on the southeast and northwest sides at a street intersection. The layout makes the entrances mirror each other, giving an overall symmetrical effect. The southwest corner of the intersection also includes an oculus for a light cone above the platform. Both entrance structures have cool roofs and green roofs. To the south of the station, there is a crossover to short turn trains.

=== Artwork ===
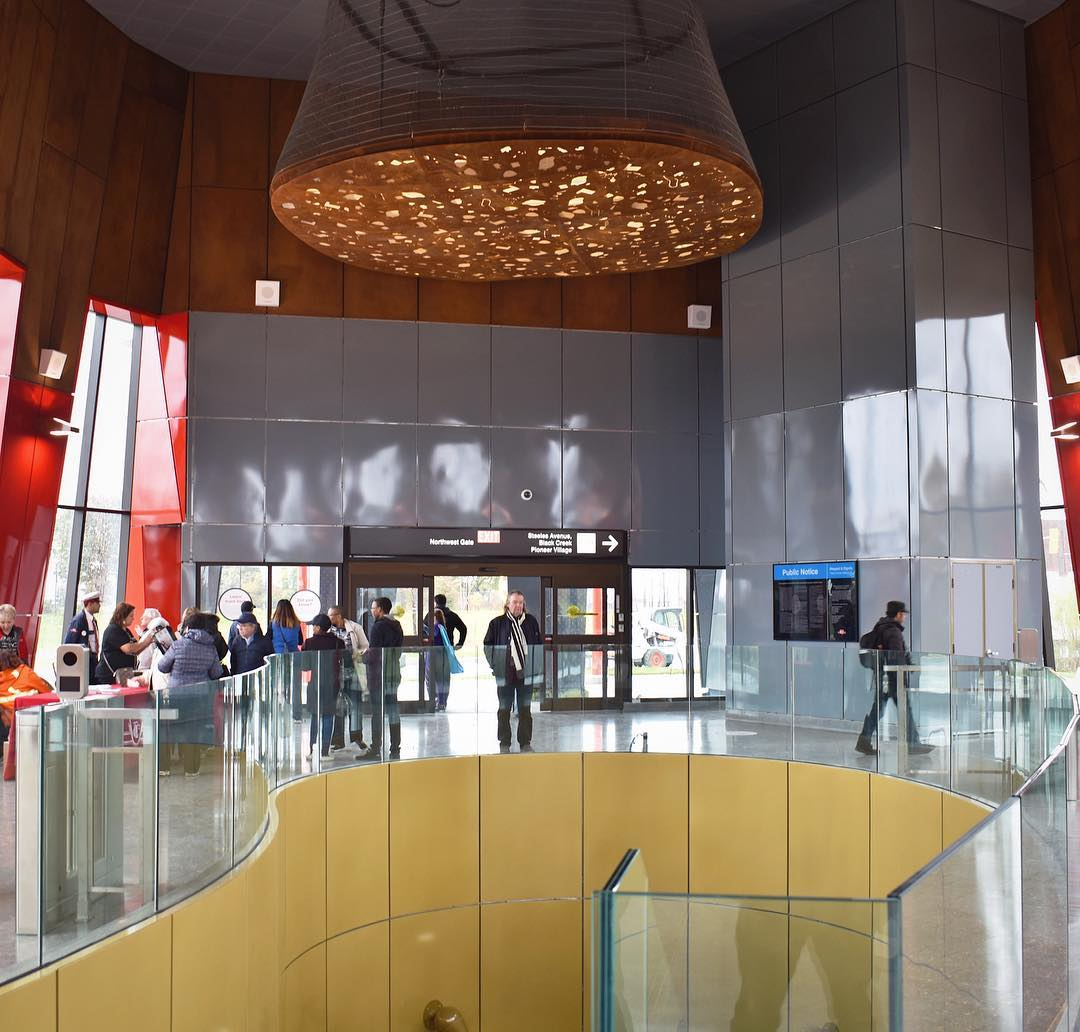
Interior of south side entrance

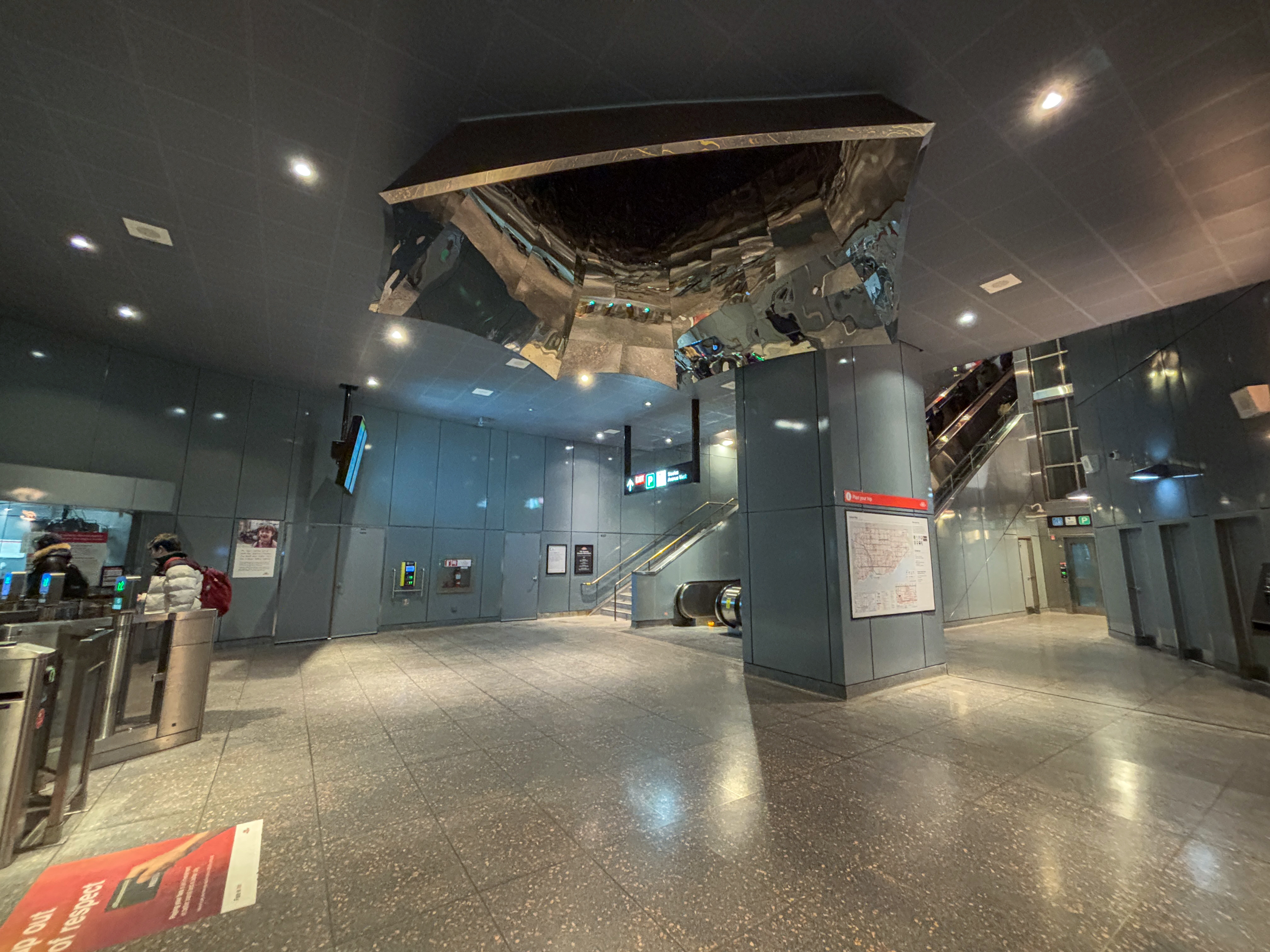
Art installation in the south mezzanine level ceiling

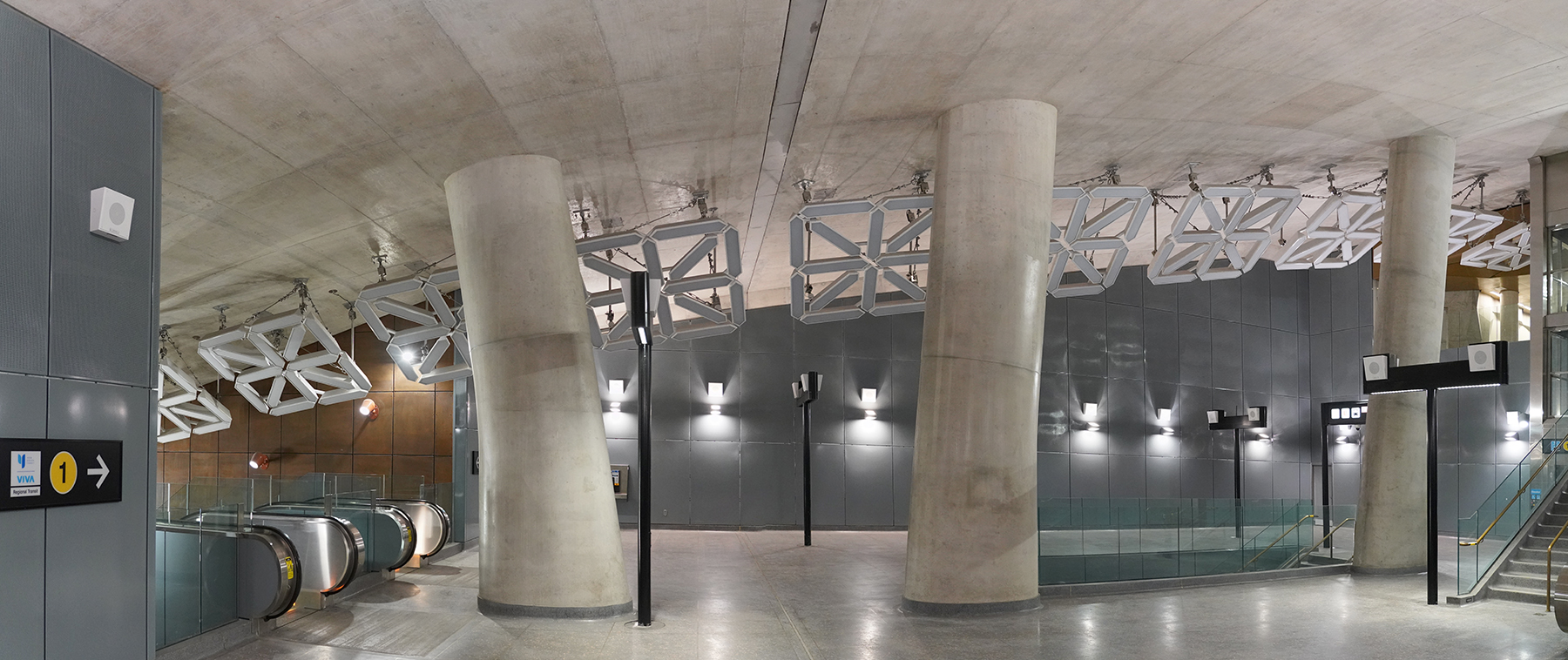
LightSpell at intermediate level

LightSpell, an interactive artwork by German artists Tim and Jan Edler, was installed at Pioneer Village at a cost of $1.9 million. This installation comprises 40 light fixtures suspended from the platform ceiling, designed to display text messages of up to eight characters submitted by passengers via touchscreens. However, when the Toronto–York Spadina subway extension (TYSSE) opened, the TTC opted not to activate LightSpell out of concern that passengers would use it to display inappropriate content, despite TTC By-law No. 1 prohibiting such language. Despite attempts by the TTC to negotiate a compromise with the artists, the artwork has yet to be activated.

== History ==
On November 27, 2009, the official ground-breaking ceremony was held for the TYSSE project, which included the construction of Pioneer Village station. Tunnelling began in June 2011. The project was expected to be completed by December 2015, later revised to the fourth quarter of 2016. The extension and station ultimately opened on December 17, 2017.

Pioneer Village was originally planned to be a temporary terminus for the western arm of Line 1 Yonge–University, which would later be extended to Vaughan Metropolitan Centre station. However, the entire extension, with its six new stations, was completed as one project.

This station, along with the five other TYSSE stations, were the first to be opened without collectors, although booths were installed as per original station plans. It was also among the first eight stations to discontinue sales of legacy TTC fare media (tokens and tickets). Presto vending machines were available at its opening to sell Presto cards and to load funds or monthly passes onto them. On May 3, 2019, this station became one of the first ten stations to sell Presto tickets via Presto vending machines.

In a 2024 court case, the TTC was ordered to pay an extra $57 million to Walsh Construction to compensate it for TTC design changes ordered while construction was in progress. Walsh claimed that the design changes resulted in inefficiencies and the rebuilding of completed tasks. The award included $412,000 related to the artwork, when the TTC and the artist decided a new rigging was required for aesthetic reasons. The TTC planned to appeal the ruling, conceding that it was responsible for 411 days of the delay; the judge found the TTC liable for 636 days of delay.

=== Name ===
Initially, the TTC planned to name the station Steeles West, following their convention of suffixing "West" to stations on the western segment of Line 1 that shared a street with those on the eastern segment (e.g. Lawrence West and Lawrence). These plans were abandoned due to the lack of a corresponding Steeles station on the eastern segment.

In 2012, the station was named Black Creek Pioneer Village, after the nearby heritage museum. This name was shortened to Pioneer Village the following year.

== Nearby landmarks ==
The major buildings of York University's main Keele Campus lie to the southeast. Canlan Ice Sports (home of York Lions hockey) and Sobeys Stadium (home of the Canadian Open tennis) are found to the southwest, the Toronto Track and Field Centre is to the east and York Lions Stadium (home of Inter Toronto FC and AFC Toronto) is to the immediate south. The station's namesake, the Village at Black Creek, lies less than one kilometre (0.62 mi) to the southwest.

== Surface connections ==
The following routes serve this station.

Bay number	Route	Name	Additional information
1	Spare		
2	84D	Sheppard West	Eastbound to Sheppard–Yonge station (Rush hour service)
3	106	Sentinel	Southbound to Sheppard West station
4	60A/B/D	Steeles West	Eastbound to Finch station
5	960B/D	Steeles West Express	Eastbound to Finch station
6	108A	Driftwood	Southbound to Sheppard West station via Grandravine Drive
6	108B	Driftwood	Southbound to Sheppard West station via Arleta Avenue
7	Wheel-Trans		
8	35A	Jane	Southbound to Mount Dennis station
8	35B	Jane	Southbound to Mount Dennis station via Hullmar Drive
9	935	Jane Express	Southbound to Jane station
10	41	Keele	Southbound to Keele station
11	60B	Steeles West	Westbound to Martin Grove Road
11	60D	Steeles West	Westbound to Highway 27
11	960B	Steeles West Express	Westbound to Martin Grove Road
11	960D	Steeles West Express	Westbound to Highway 27
12	166	Toryork	Westbound to Milvan Drive (Rush hour service)
N/A	335	Jane	Blue Night service; northbound to York University and southbound to Jane station (Overnight service stops on-street and does not enter the station.)
N/A	353	Steeles	Blue Night service; westbound to York University and eastbound to Staines (Overnight service stops on-street and does not enter the station.)

=== Pioneer Village Terminal ===
Pioneer Village Terminal
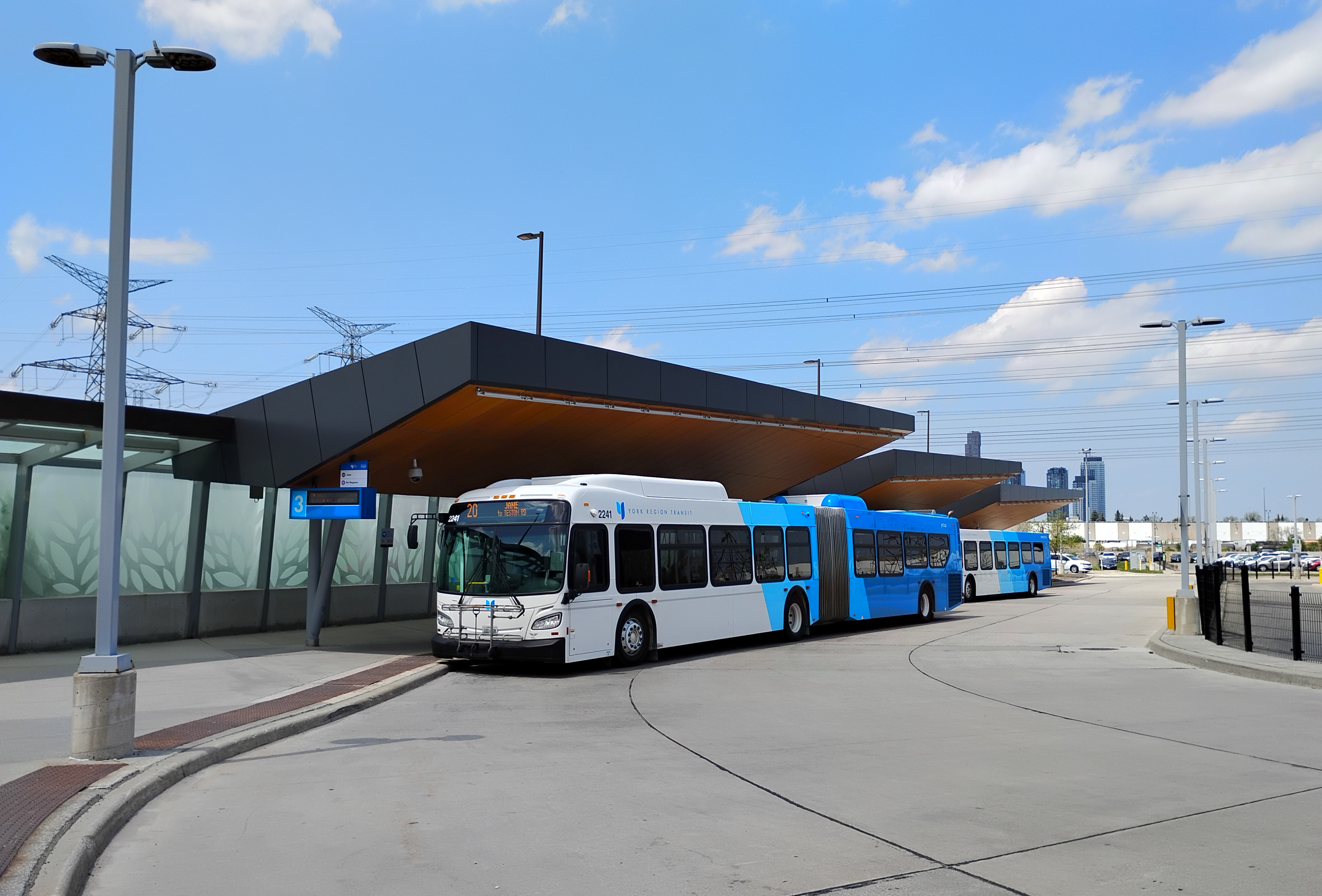

General information
- Location: 2800 Steeles Avenue West, Vaughan, Ontario; Canada
- Coordinates: 43°46′41″N 79°30′43″W
- Owner: Regional Municipality of York
- Operator: York Region Transit
- Bus routes: YRT buses: 3 Thornhill; 20 Jane; 96 Keele–Yonge; 107 Keele; 165 Weston
- Bus stands: 5
- Connections: FlixBus

Construction
- Accessible: Yes

Other information
- Website: Official station page

History
- Opened: December 17, 2017
Location

A York Region Transit bus terminal is located outside the station's fare-paid area on the north side of Steeles Avenue on the west side of Northwest Gate. It lies adjacent to the commuter parking lot and has an outdoor walkway linking it with the station.

The following YRT routes serve the terminal:

Route	Name	Additional information
3	Thornhill	Eastbound to Steeles Avenue and Don Mills Road via Promenade Terminal
20	Jane	Northbound to Teston Road via Highway 407 station, Vaughan Metro Centre station, Vaughan Mills Terminal, and Major Mackenzie West Terminal
96	Keele–Yonge	Northbound to Newmarket Bus Terminal via King Road
107	Keele	Northbound to Teston Road
107B	Keele	Northbound to Rutherford GO Station (Weekday service)
165	Weston	Northbound to Major Mackenzie West Terminal

FlixBus service to Toronto Pearson Airport, Kingston, and Ottawa stops at the terminal.
