= IBI Group =

Canadian-based architecture, engineering, planning and technology firm

IBI Group Inc.
- Company type: Subsidiary
- Industry: Professional services; Architecture design; Landscape architecture; Engineering consulting; Civil engineering; Technology Consulting
- Founded: 1974; 52 years ago
- Founder: Neal Irwin; Phil Beinhaker
- Headquarters: 55 St. Clair Avenue West, Toronto, Ontario, Canada
- Area served: Canada, Caribbean, China, Greece, India, Ireland, Israel, Mexico, UAE, United Kingdom, United States
- Key people: Scott Stewart-CEO; David Thom-President
- Net income: CAD $25.25 million (2021)
- Number of employees: 3,400 (2022)
- Parent: Arcadis (2022–present)
- Subsidiaries: Page and Steele
- Website: www.arcadis.com

IBI Group Inc. is a Canadian-based architecture, engineering, planning, and technology firm operating from over 60 offices in 12 countries across the world.

Founded in 1974 in Toronto, Canada, IBI Group was ranked as one of the largest architecture or architecture/engineering firms in the world: in 2011 it ranked 4th or 6th (depending on the methodology used); in 2016 it was ranked as the 8th largest architecture firm (with 836 fee-earning architects) by BD Online; and in 2016 its United States operations were ranked by ArchDaily as the 13th largest architecture firm in the USA.

As of 2022, IBI Group had approximately 3,400 employees and more than 60 offices located across six continents. IBI Group's consulting services business were concentrated in three practice areas: Intelligence, Buildings and Infrastructure. By integrating productivity tools, processes and technology innovations developed through IBI's Intelligence practice, the company was able to drive incremental growth in its traditional Buildings and Infrastructures practices, while generating more efficient results for IBI clients.

On September 27, 2022, it was acquired by Arcadis.

== History ==
The IBI Group was founded in Toronto by nine partners to provide professional planning and design services for urban development and transportation projects.

The firm merged with Robbie/Young + Wright Architects to become Robbie Young + Wright / IBI Group Architects, with noted Toronto architect Rod Robbie as chairman emeritus. In 2004 the firm became a publicly owned entity through the formation of the IBI Income Fund. In 2010 the Fund was converted to a corporation, IBI Group Inc.

The firm's name was derived from the last initials of its two founding principals, Neal Irwin and Phil Beinhaker. The firm has rebranded itself, stating the IBI stands for "Intelligence, Buildings, and Infrastructure."

In September 2022, IBI Group was acquired by Arcadis.

== Major acquisitions ==
Since 2000 the firm has expanded through mergers and acquisitions of consulting firms in multiple locations. Some have been folded into the IBI Group brand and others have maintained a distinct identity. The major acquisitions below are listed in chronological order.

=== Cumming Cockburn ===
In 2004, IBI Group acquired the Ontario architecture and consulting firm Cumming Cockburn, as well as its subsidiaries CCL Consultants and Marshall Cumming & Associates.

=== Vancouver office ===
The Vancouver office expanded through the 2005 merger of Hancock Bruckner, Eng + Wright; Lawrence Doyle Architects; and Young + Wright Architects.

=== Grey-Noble & Grey-Noble ===
In 2005 the Newmarket, Ontario-based architectural firm of Grey-Noble & Grey-Noble was acquired.

=== Thomas Blurock Architects ===
In 2006 the Costa Mesa, California-based educational project-focused firm of Thomas Blurock Architects was acquired and incorporated.

=== Page+Steele ===
In 2008 the Toronto-based firm of Page+Steele, Architects was acquired and operates as Page+Steele/IBI Group.

=== Gruzen Samton Architects ===
In 2009 the New York City based firm of Gruzen Samton Architects, Planners & Interior Designers was acquired. The firm was founded in 1936 as Kelly & Gruzen and operates as IBI Group.

=== Group Architects ===
In 2009 the small Toronto-based firm of Group Architects was acquired. IBI relocated and redistributed its team to a new location and the company and presence dissolved entirely through the following years.

=== BFGC Architects Planners ===
In 2009, BFGC Architects Planners, with offices in Bakersfield, San Luis Obispo and San Jose, California, was acquired.

=== Nightingale Architects ===
In 2010, Nightingale Architects, with four offices in the United Kingdom, including in London and Cardiff, was acquired for £13.1 million.

=== Dull Olson Weekes Architects ===
In 2010, IBI acquired the Portland, Oregon-based firm of Dull Olson Weekes Architects, a regional specialist in the design of educational facilities with offices in Portland and Seattle, Washington. It has received multiple awards for its work, including the CEFPI/A4LE James D. MacConnell Award for excellence in design and planning, in 2009 for the Rosa Parks School and Community Campus at New Columbia, in 2014 for Trillium Creek Primary School, and in 2020 as a finalist for Mary Lyon Elementary School. The firm operates as IBI Group Architects.

=== Cardinal Hardy Architectes ===
In 2011, the Quebec-based firm of Cardinal Hardy merged with Beinhaker Architecte (within the IBI Group), and became known as Cardinal Hardy Beinhaker Architecte. Groupe Cardinal Hardy merged into the IBI Group. Three years later, in late 2014, it was sold to Montreal-based architecture group Lemay.

=== Carol R. Johnson Associates ===
In 2011 the Boston based landscape architecture firm Carol R. Johnson Associates was acquired.

=== Bay Architects ===
In 2011 the Houston, Texas-based firm of Bay Architects was acquired.

=== Taylor Young ===
In 2012, Taylor Young, a United Kingdom-based architectural and master-planning practice headquartered in Cheshire and with offices in Liverpool and London, was acquired.

=== M-E Companies ===
In 2012, M-E Companies, an Ohio-based engineering firm with offices in Westerville, Cincinnati and Canton was acquired.

=== Aspyr ===
IBI acquired the British Columbia-based Aspyr Engineering on September 3, 2019.

=== Cole Engineering Group ===
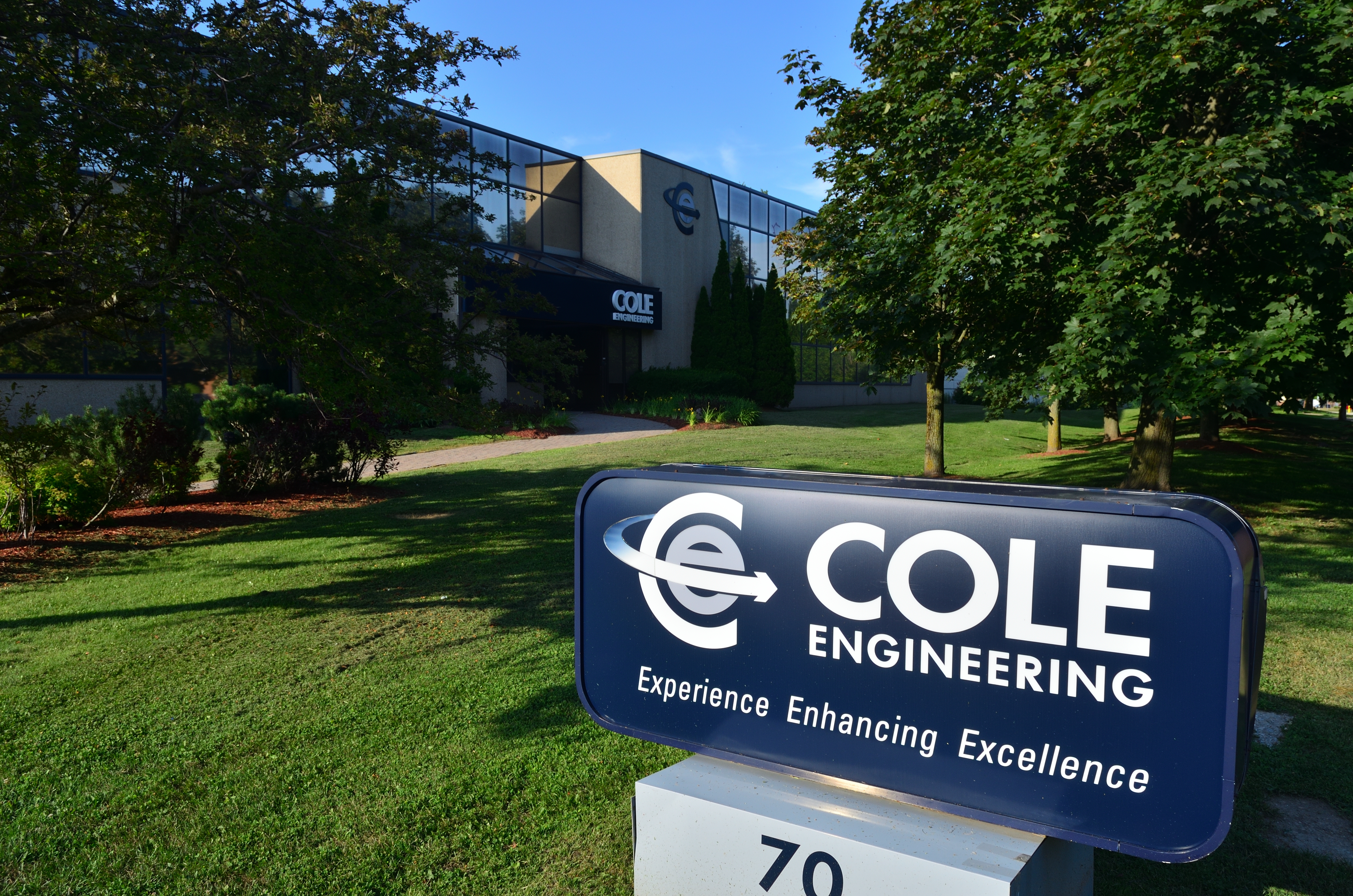
Cole Engineering Group in Markham

IBI acquired the Cole Engineering Group on December 1, 2020.

== Major projects ==
Major projects, ordered by type, are:

=== Masterplans ===
- Benxi New City, Benxi, China
- 2012 Summer Olympics - Travel demand management program, London
- CaféTO, Toronto
- Al Bandar Development Master Plan, Muscat
- Bhubaneswar Smart City Strategy and Implementation, Bhubaneswar

=== Government ===
- States of Jersey Police headquarters, Jersey
- Fire Station 16 and Calgary Fire Department Headquarter, Calgary

=== Cultural ===
- Parliament of Canada Visitor Centre Phase 1 (with Moriyama & Teshima Architects), Ottawa
- Boca Raton Center for the Arts and Innovation, Boca Raton

=== Education ===
- 41 Cooper Square, New York City
- Diamond Ranch High School (executive architect), Pomona, California
- École secondaire catholique Père-Philippe-Lamarche, Toronto, Ontario
- Franklin High School renovation
- Heschel School - Ronald P. Stanton Campus, New York City
- Rosa Parks School and Community Campus at New Columbia
- Ridgeview High School (Redmond, Oregon)
- Sabine Pass K-12 School, Sabine Pass
- San Jacinto College Maritime Center, Houston
- Sandy High School, Sandy, Oregon
- School of One, New York City
- Stuyvesant High School, New York City
- Trillium Creek Primary School, Portland

=== Transportation ===
- Evergreen Point Floating Bridge, Lake Washington, Washington
- Pioneer Village station, Toronto
- Victoria Park station (Toronto) renovation
- Line 1, Ottawa - station design
- Bloomington GO Station, Richmond Hill, Ontario
- Line 5 Eglinton, Toronto

=== Office ===
- Ericsson R&D Complex, Research Triangle Park, North Carolina
- Boston Landing, New Balance World Headquarters, Boston

=== Leisure ===
- Delta Toronto Hotel, Toronto
- Oceanside Dolphin Hotel, San Diego

=== Mixed use ===
- Holt Renfrew, Calgary, Vancouver and Mississauga
- Parq Vancouver, Vancouver

=== Residential ===
- 88 Scott Street, Toronto
- Atlantis The Royal, Dubai

=== Healthcare ===
- BC Cancer Research Centre, Vancouver (with Henriquez Partners Architects)
- Optegra Eye Hospital, London
- Queen Elizabeth University Hospital, Glasgow
- Royal Hospital for Children, Glasgow

== Products ==
=== HotSpot ===
IBI Group acquired HotSpot in June 2022 for $5.74 million. Founded in 2013, HotSpot allows users to pay for municipal parking from their phones, or pay for and receive real-time updates about bus services, as well as order and pay for taxis.

=== CurbIQ ===
CurbIQ is IBI Group's curbside management tool intended to allow municipalities and mobility companies to manage curbside operations by digitizing their regulation. It was created as a result of IBI Group's Curbside Management Strategy created for the City of Toronto for the 2015 Pan American and Parapan American Games.

CurbIQ consists of four modules:

- Curb Viewer - map-based visualization tool allows municipalities to visualise their existing curbside regulations.
- Curb Manager - simplified GIS platform for municipalities to efficiently manage their curbside by adding, removing, or modifying curbside regulations.
- Curb Analyzer - quantifies the designations of curb spaces to provide city planners with trends on their usage
- Curb Rules API - to allow transportation network companies, such as ridesharing applications, and commercial vehicle dispatches, to add information about curbside regulations to their own applications.

CurbIQ was used to launch a SENATOR pilot project in Dublin, Ireland that aimed to create a new logistics system to improve the city's transportation network in 2022.

=== Nspace ===
Nspace is a desk and conference room booking and visitor management application intended to support flexible work arrangements.

== Acquisition by Arcadis ==
IBI Group announced on July 18, 2022, that it has entered into an agreement with the Dutch design, engineering and management consulting company Arcadis to "acquire all issued and outstanding shares" for $19.50 per share, a thirty percent premium on the day's closing price. The approximately $873 million acquisition was finalised in September 2022 after a shareholder vote.
