= Station box =

Structure containing an underground station

A schematic view of a station box.

A station box is a construction-industry term describing a box-like underground structure for a transportation system, for example a metro or tube station.

Station boxes are built in two methods – "top-down" or "bottom-up". In the "bottom-up" method, a chamber as large as the station structure is dug into the ground into which the station is built. Poured concrete or pre-cast panels are then used to form the various levels and internal structures, similar to the construction of the underground basements of high rise buildings. When the construction is complete, this station box is covered again up to the street level.

In the "top-down" method, a depth is excavated, a concrete slab is laid, and then excavation continues downwards to the base of the station box. At the end of excavation, a similar result to the "bottom-up" method is obtained – with the concrete slabs and supports for the various levels of the station already constructed.

When building an underground transportation system using tunnel boring machines (TBM), the station box can be built before or after the TBM goes through that area. If the station box is created after the TBM has passed through, the tunnel built by the TBM would be replaced by the station box. If the station box is built before the TBM passes through, the TBM would drill through the side of the station box, would have to be moved to the other side of the station box where it would restart the tunnel boring process.

Station box construction methods have been used in a wide variety of subway and metro projects. Examples include Crossrail in London, UK; the Toronto–York Spadina Subway Extension in Toronto, Canada; Sydney Metro in Sydney, Australia and the Thomson–East Coast Line in Singapore.

Occasionally, station boxes are left uncovered, such as at Stratford International in London, England – which is located in "Stratford Box", a 1.1-kilometre (0.68 mi) concrete-sided cutting.

The lowest level – where the platform for the arriving and departing trains is – is called the "platform level". Often another underground level – the "concourse level" – is placed on top of the platform level. This level may contain ticket vending machines, offices, the station master room, technical rooms, stores and shops and other station facilities.
