= York University station =

Toronto subway station

York University
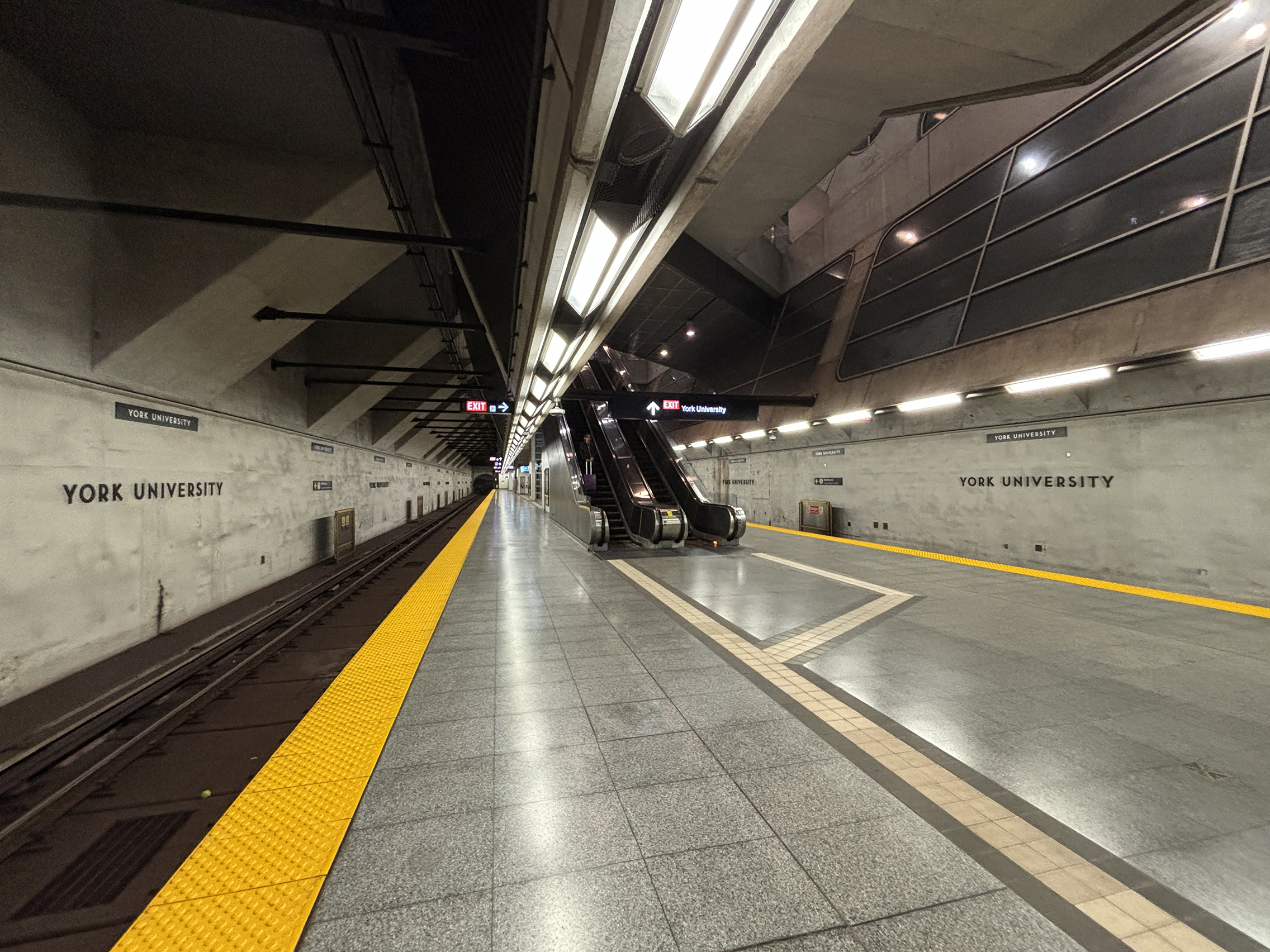

General information
- Location: 120 Ian Macdonald Boulevard; Toronto, Ontario; Canada
- Coordinates: 43°46′27″N 79°29′59″W
- Platforms: Centre platform
- Tracks: 2
- Connections: TTC buses: 41 Keele; 335 Jane; 341 Keele

Construction
- Structure type: Underground
- Accessible: Yes
- Architect: Foster + Partners, Adamson Associates (as architect of record)
- Architectural style: High-tech architecture

Other information
- Website: Official station page

History
- Opened: December 17, 2017; 8 years ago

Passengers
- 2023–2024: 30,112
- Rank: 33 of 70

Services
Preceding station	Toronto Transit Commission	Following station
Pioneer Village towards Vaughan	Line 1 Yonge–University	Finch West towards Finch
Location

York University is a subway station on Line 1 Yonge–University of the Toronto subway. It is located on the main Keele Campus of York University, near Ian Macdonald and York Boulevards in the former city of North York. It opened in 2017, as part of the extension of the subway to Vaughan Metropolitan Centre.

== History ==
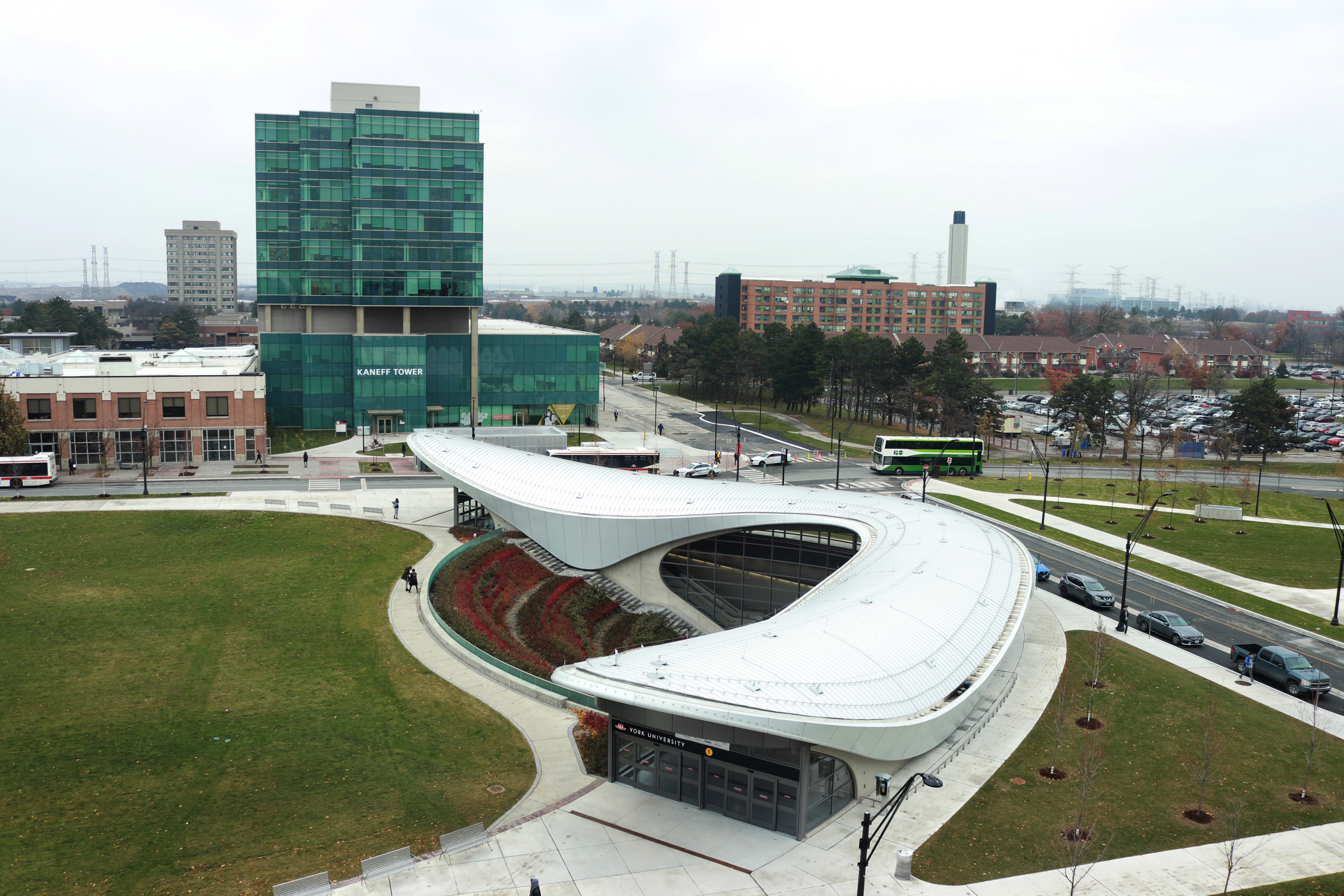
York University station entrance building prior to the station's opening in November 2017

The official groundbreaking ceremony for the Toronto–York Spadina subway extension (TYSSE) was held on November 27, 2009; however, tunnelling operations did not commence until June 2011.

The first stage of construction for the station began in May 2011. On October 11, 2011, one of the geostructural drilling rigs on site collapsed and killed Kyle Knox, an operator working for a contractor on the project, Anchor Shoring. The incident injured five other workers.

The project, including York University station, was initially expected to be completed by the second quarter of 2015 but was delayed to the fourth quarter of 2016; ultimately, the station opened on December 17, 2017.

Before the extension opened, more than 1,400 Toronto Transit Commission (TTC) buses served the campus every weekday at the York University Bus Loop, in addition to hundreds more from regional services: GO Transit, York Region Transit (YRT), Brampton Transit's Züm, and Greyhound. The opening of the subway resulted in a greatly reduced number of buses entering campus as the 196 York University Rocket bus route was eliminated and other routes such as the 195 Jane Rocket (now 935 Jane Express) and 199B Finch Rocket (now 939B Finch Express) were altered to terminate at Pioneer Village and Finch West stations instead, leaving only the 41 Keele and 106 Sentinel routes servicing the university grounds directly. Regional buses no longer serve the campus, having been moved to stations farther north or cancelled.

This station, along with the five other TYSSE stations, were the first to be opened without collectors, although booths were installed as per original station plans. It was also among the first eight stations to discontinue sales of legacy TTC fare media (tokens and tickets). Presto vending machines were available at its opening to sell Presto cards and to load funds or monthly passes onto them. On May 3, 2019, this station became one of the first ten stations to sell Presto tickets via Presto vending machines.

The station was expected to have around 27,000 riders every day, owing to its location at York University. As of 2022, the station is the busiest on the extension to Vaughan, with over 30,000 riders on an average weekday.

== Description ==
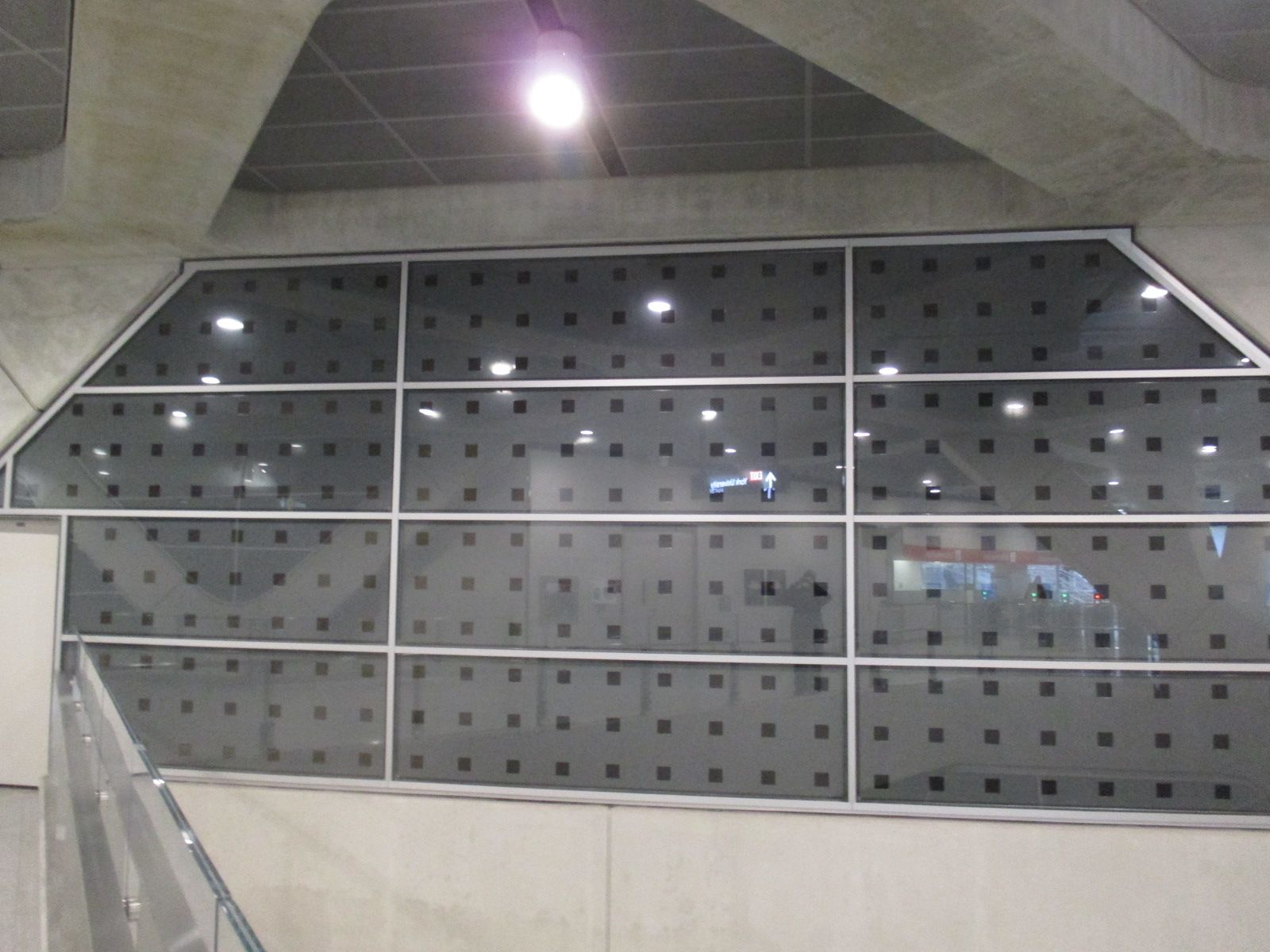
Artwork Piston Effect produces a lighting display when a train passes.

The station lies at the east end the Harry W. Arthurs Common on the west side of Ian MacDonald Boulevard. The university's main buildings lie to the west; Seneca College's York campus is found to the south, and Sobeys Stadium to the west. The station was built underground, lying on a northwest–southeast axis. The line approaches from Finch West station along Keele Street, then bends towards the northwest to meet the station.

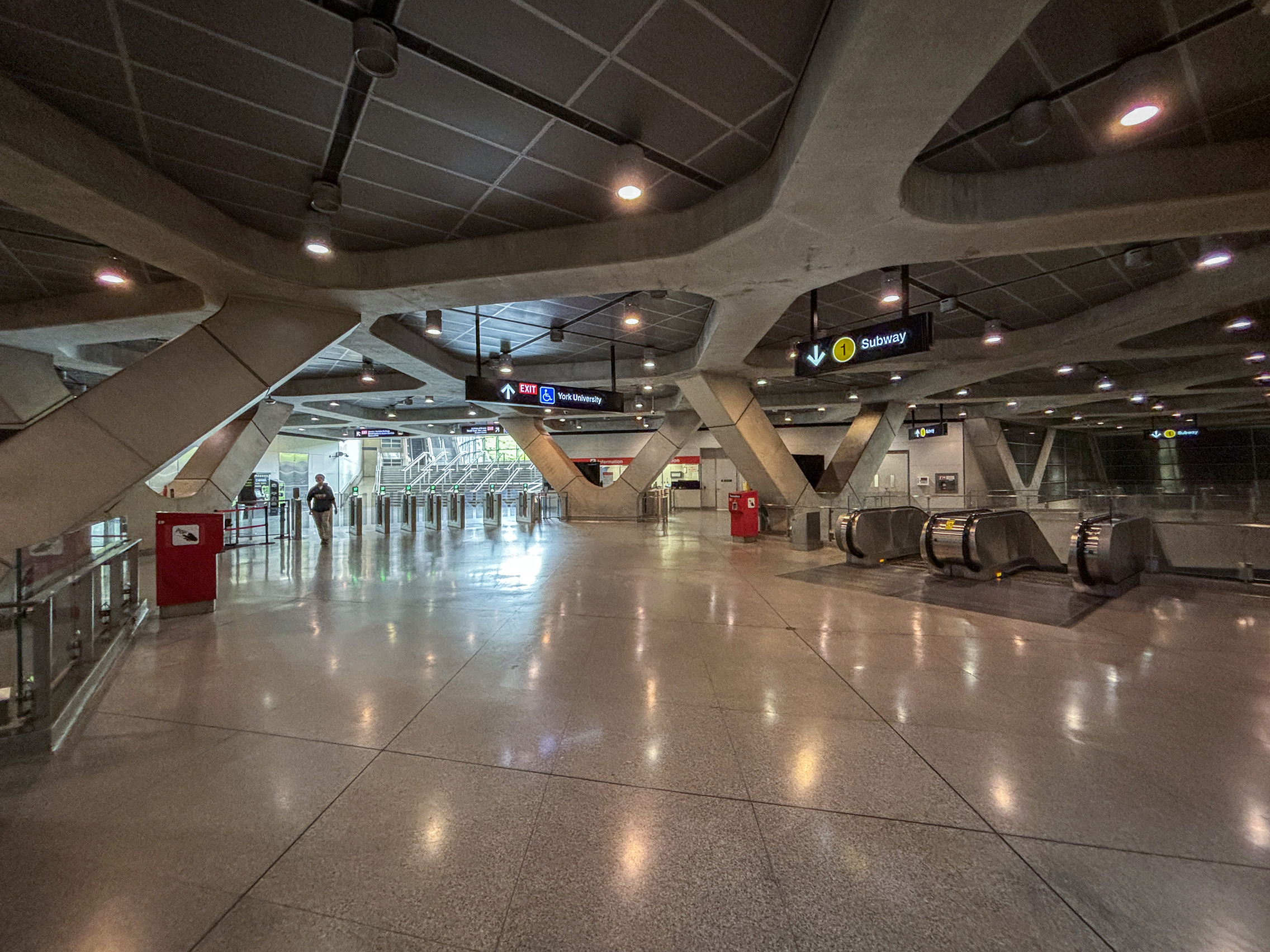
Concourse level and faregates

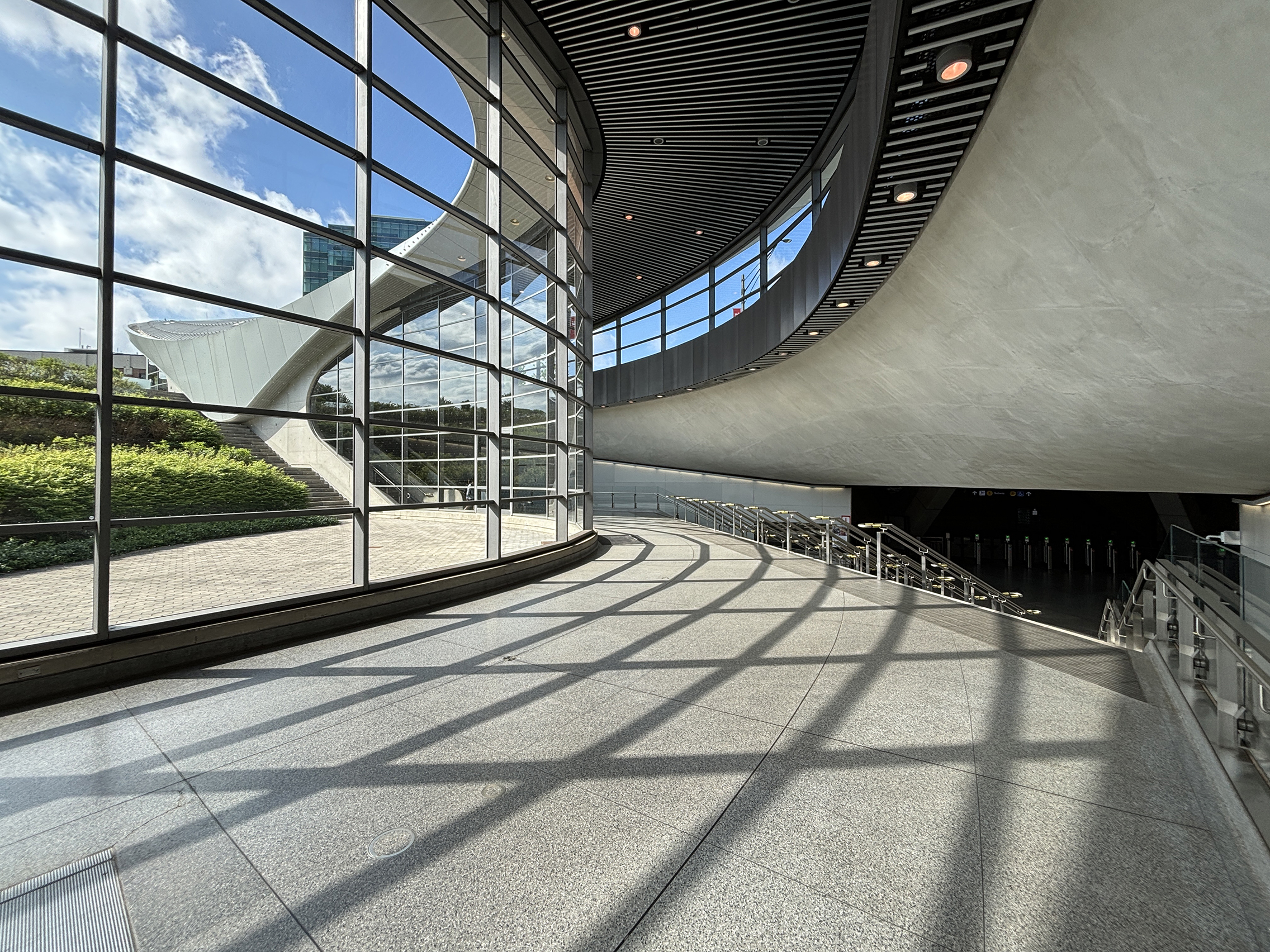
Concourse level windows

Engineering consultants Arup and architecture firm Foster and Partners designed the station, which has a boomerang shape with entrances at the north and south ends of the structure; Adamson Associates served as the architect of record. The station incorporates themes first explored in underground stations for Canary Wharf in London and the Bilbao Metro in Spain, which were also designed by Foster and Partners. Its design considers the surrounding public space and uses natural light to intuitively guide passengers from the entrance down to the platforms.

The north entrance contains stairs and escalators down to the concourse level and then more stairs to the fare gates. Besides stairs, the south entrance provides a barrier-free route consisting of an elevator to the concourse level plus a ramp to the fare gates. Natural light flows through the concourse down to the platform level. The station has a metal cool roof to reflect heat from the sun. The fare-paid area features a Gateway Newstands kiosk.

=== Artwork ===
"Piston Effect" consists of a series of glass panels on the west walls at concourse level and above the northbound track. Behind the panels are liquid crystal displays (LCDs) that detect the passage of a train and then produce a lighting display in various tones of black and white. It was designed by British-based Jason Bruges Studio, who specialize in kinetic and light art.

== Surface connections ==
To reduce bus traffic on campus, the station has no attached bus terminal and routes still serving the campus make direct connections to the subway at Pioneer Village station on Steeles Avenue at the north end of the university grounds, after being moved from the campus TTC bus loop when the subway opened. Transfers are required to connect to surface routes on-street:

Route	Name	Additional information
41	Keele	Northbound to Pioneer Village station and southbound to Keele station
335	Jane	Blue Night service; southbound to Jane station
341	Keele	Blue Night service; southbound to Keele station
353	Steeles	Blue Night service; eastbound to Staines Road

== Former regional transit ==
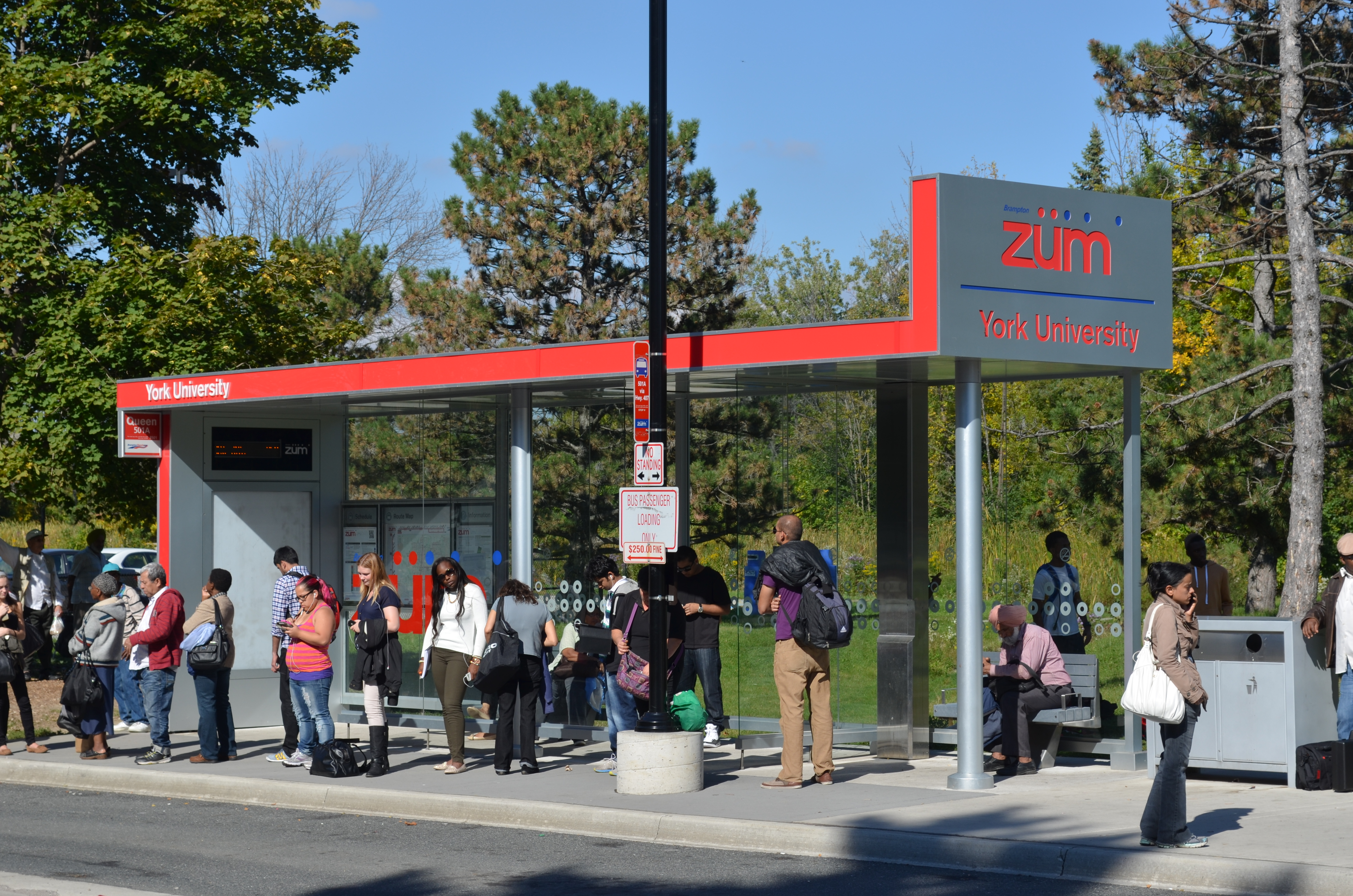
The former Züm stop on Ian Macdonald Boulevard in 2013, four years before the station itself opened

There are no regional transit agencies serving the station, although it (and the university campus) used to be a major regional transit hub.

YRT became the first agency to pull out on September 2, 2018, when all YRT routes were moved to Pioneer Village station. On January 7, 2019, GO Transit also ended service to the campus and station, with buses connecting to the more distant Highway 407 station.

Brampton Transit's route 501 Züm Queen remained the sole non-TTC service serving the campus. The main branch of the route was cut back to Vaughan Metropolitan Centre station in September 2018, leaving only the express A and C branches to serve the campus. These express branches were later suspended in March and April 2020, coinciding with service reductions in response to the global COVID-19 pandemic, resulting in no regional buses operating to and from the campus for the next two and a half years, until the 501C branch was restored with limited weekday service on September 6, 2022. On June 24, 2024, the 501C was cancelled permanently, with high operating costs due to Highway 407 tolls being cited as the rationale for the cancellation, again leaving the station and campus without connecting regional transit.

Between January 2018 and March 2020, there was a $1.50 fare discount for GO Transit riders paying with Presto, transferring to or from the subway (a TTC system-wide policy with GO).

Prior to the implementation of the One Fare fare-integration policy introduced on February 26, 2024, when passengers paying with Presto, credit, or debit cards could transfer free between regional buses and the TTC, there was an inactive proposal to eliminate the double fare (YRT plus TTC) for passengers arriving at the York University campus from Vaughan Metropolitan Centre, Highway 407, or Pioneer Village stations in or bordering York Region who transferred from connecting YRT buses. A memorandum of understanding between the TTC and YRT stated "Upon commencement of revenue services operations of the [TYSSE], York Region agrees not to operate or permit the operation of public transit services directly onto the York University campus." This assumed the elimination of the double fare for those riding a YRT bus to the stations in York Region and continuing by subway to the campus. The plan was to use a third-party technology system to reimburse one of the two fares, though the policy was never implemented. Despite the continued lack of fare integration, YRT stopped serving the campus in September 2018, forcing passengers to walk from the Pioneer Village Terminal or pay a TTC fare to take the subway one stop to reach it.

== See also ==
- York University Busway
