= Finch West =

Finch West may refer to either of the following elements of the Toronto subway system:

- Finch West station, an interchange station connecting Line 1 Yonge–University and Line 6 Finch West
- Line 6 Finch West, a light rail transit line operating since 2025
