= York University Heights =

Coordinates: 43.762°N 79.500°W

York University Heights/Northwood Park
- Neighbourhood
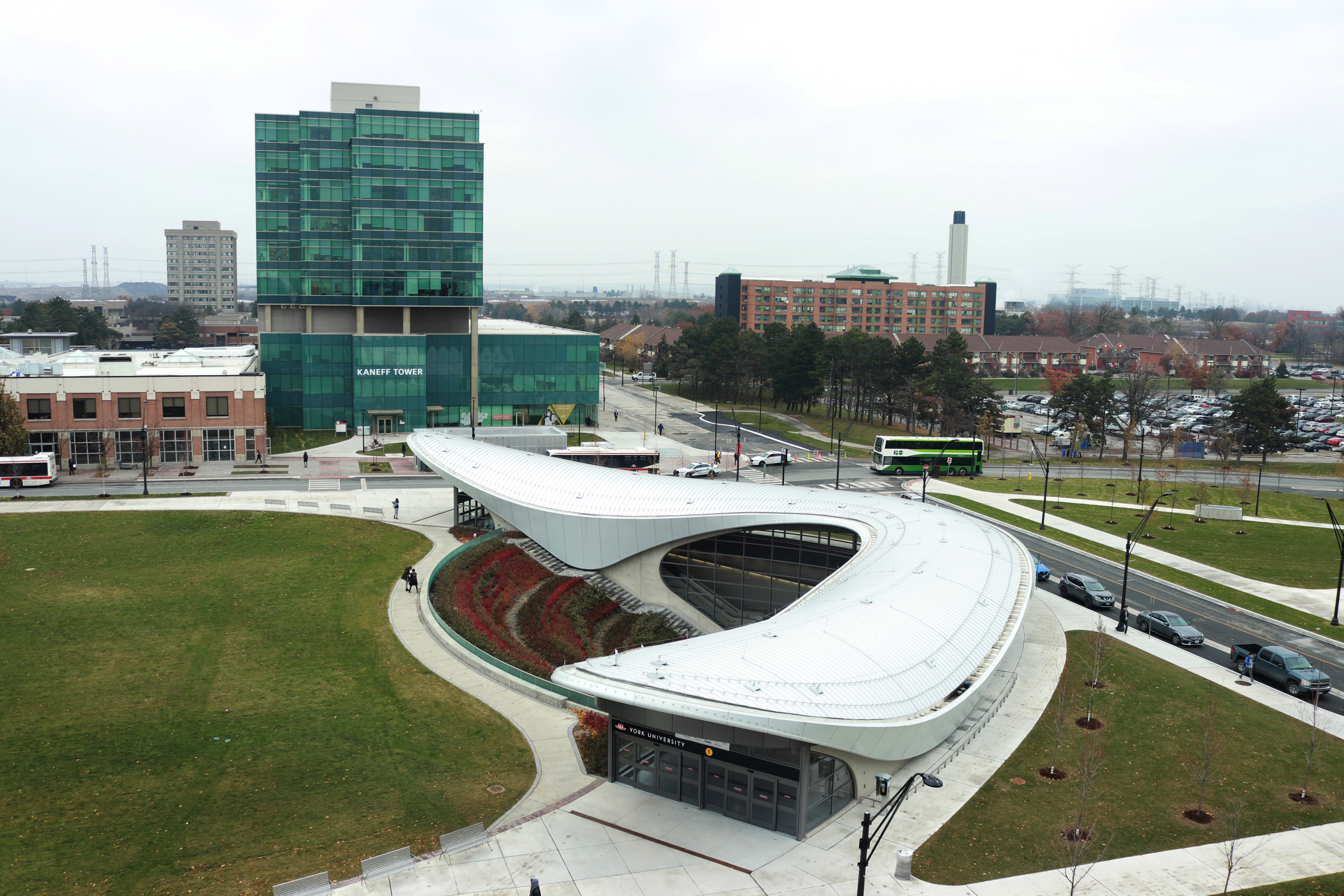
- View of York University Heights from York University station

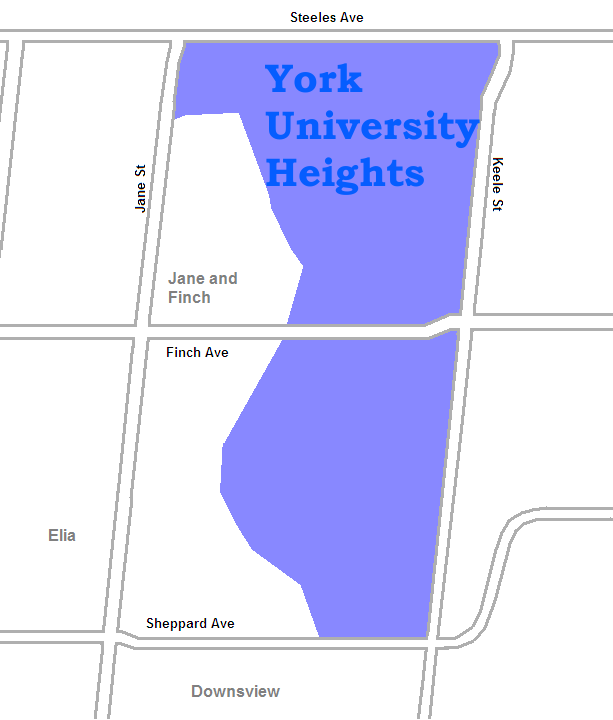
- Country: Canada
- Province: Ontario
- City: Toronto
- Municipality established: 1850 York Township
- Changed municipality: 1922 North York from York Township
- Changed municipality: 1998 Toronto from North York

Population (2016)
  - Total: 27,593
  - Density: 2,086/km^{2} (5,400/sq mi)

York University Heights, also known as Northwood Park, is a neighbourhood in Toronto, Ontario, Canada. It is one of Toronto's northernmost neighbourhoods, located along the northern boundary of Steeles Avenue in the former city of North York. The neighbourhood is so named because it contains the main campus of York University. This area is most popular with immigrants of Italian and Chinese descent who have established communities in the area. It is located between Sheppard Avenue and Steeles Avenue east of Black Creek (Derrydowns Park).

The neighborhood contains many private residences, many of which are detached and semi-detached bungalows, townhouses as well as a recent new urbanism development, The Village at York University, there is also a handful of condominiums, several lowrise apartments, and a few high rise apartments.

== History ==
=== The Village at York University ===
The Village at York University is one of the last major new-home developments within the City of Toronto including condominium townhouses, semi-detached and detached homes. First residents moved into the first phase of approximately 550 homes in the summer of 2005. A second phase, which started construction in 2007, adds about 300 more homes but includes no new townhouses. It is located just south of the York University campus, north of Finch Avenue.

Characteristics of The Village:

- It sits on land purchased from York University by the real estate developer Tribute Communities, within the boundaries of the city's secondary plan for York, and in some ways is still considered part of the university community. First-time buyers were given no-cost memberships to York's athletic facilities and privileges at its libraries. Many residents of the Village are York students and staff.
- The development's design is loosely based on what is called "new urbanism", the features of which include high density, garages opening to laneways in the back, and plenty of balconies and terraces.
- The neighbourhood is served by three subway stations on Line 1 Yonge–University: Pioneer Village station is located at the intersection of Steeles Avenue West and Northwest Gate (east of Jane Street), and is partially within the City of Vaughan; York University station is located in the centre of the York University campus, and Finch West station is located at the corner of Finch Avenue and Keele Street.
- The Village, though no longer on university-owned land, is considered part of the broader university area by city planners, and is a component of the York University Secondary Plan.
- A significant number of homes in The Village offer—or have been totally converted into—student housing.

The Village is served by a residents group representing both renters and homeowners, which was incorporated in mid-2006.

== Education ==
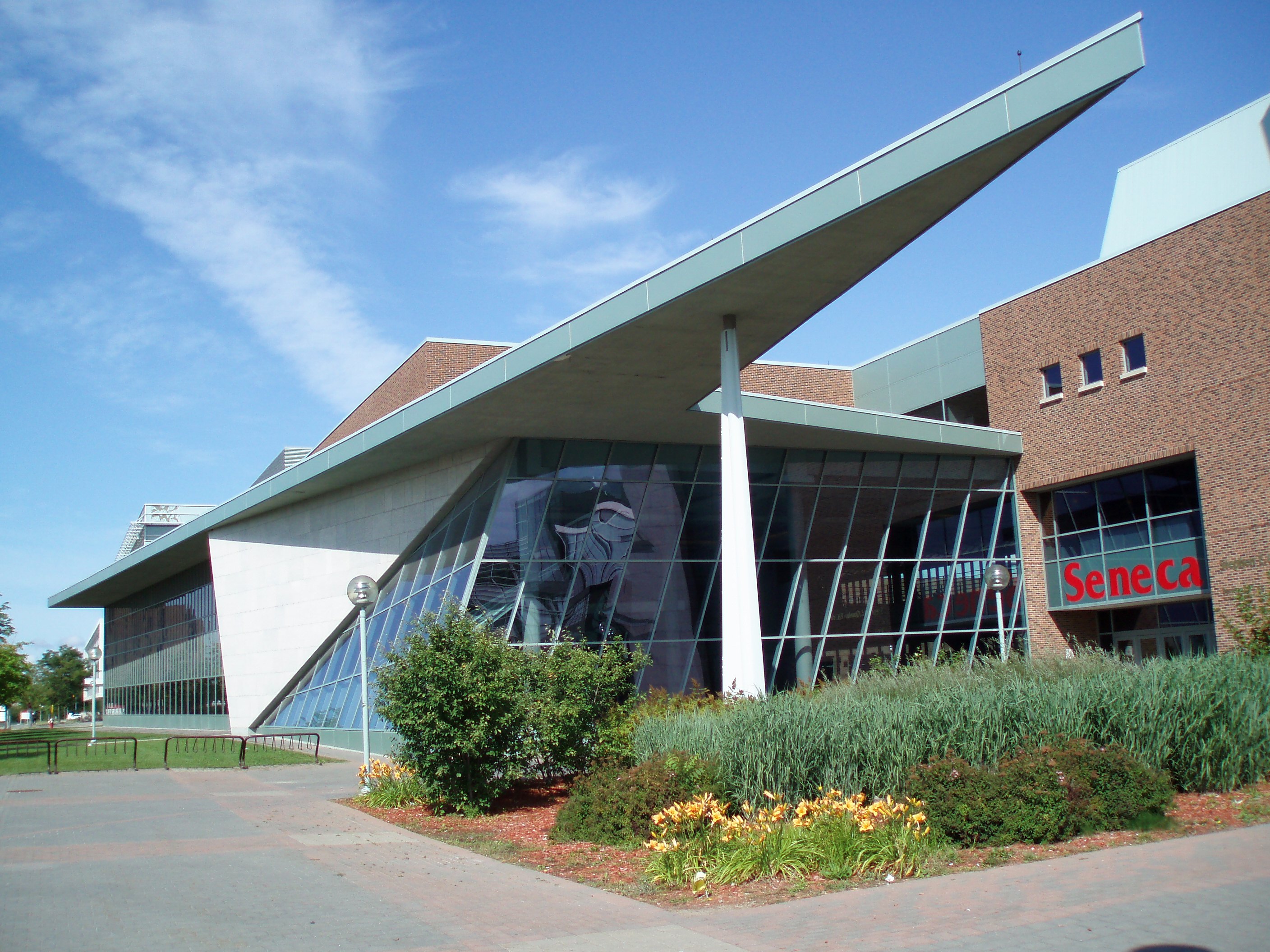
In the northwest of the neighbourhood is the campus for York University, which also holds Seneca College's Seneca@York campus.

Two public school boards operate schools in York University Heights, the separate Toronto Catholic District School Board (TCDSB), and the secular Toronto District School Board (TDSB). The French first language public secular school board, Conseil scolaire Viamonde, and it separate counterpart, Conseil scolaire catholique MonAvenir also offer schooling to applicable residents of Morningside, although they do not operate a school in the neighbourhood, with CSCM/CSV students attending schools situated in other neighbourhoods in Toronto.

Both TCDSB, and TDSB operate public elementary schools in the neighbourhood. TCDSB operates one elementary school in the neighbourhood, St. Wilfred Catholic School; whereas TDSB operate five institutions that provide primary education, Derrydown Public School, Elia Middle School, Lamberton Public School, Sheppard Public School, and Stilecroft Public School. Both school boards also operate public secondary schools in the neighbourhood. TCDSB operates James Cardinal McGuigan Catholic High School, whereas TDSB operates C. W. Jefferys Collegiate Institute.

In addition to elementary and secondary education institutions, the northwest portion of the neighbourhood is home to two public post-secondary institutions, York University, as well as a branch of Seneca College, located at the same university campus.

== Demographics ==
Major ethnic populations (2016):

- 30.6% White; 12.5% Italian, 6.9% Canadian
- 18.8% Black; 7.4% Jamaican
- 15.2% South Asian
- 9.9% Filipino
- 8.4% East Asian
- 6.4% Latin American (of any race)

== Transportation ==
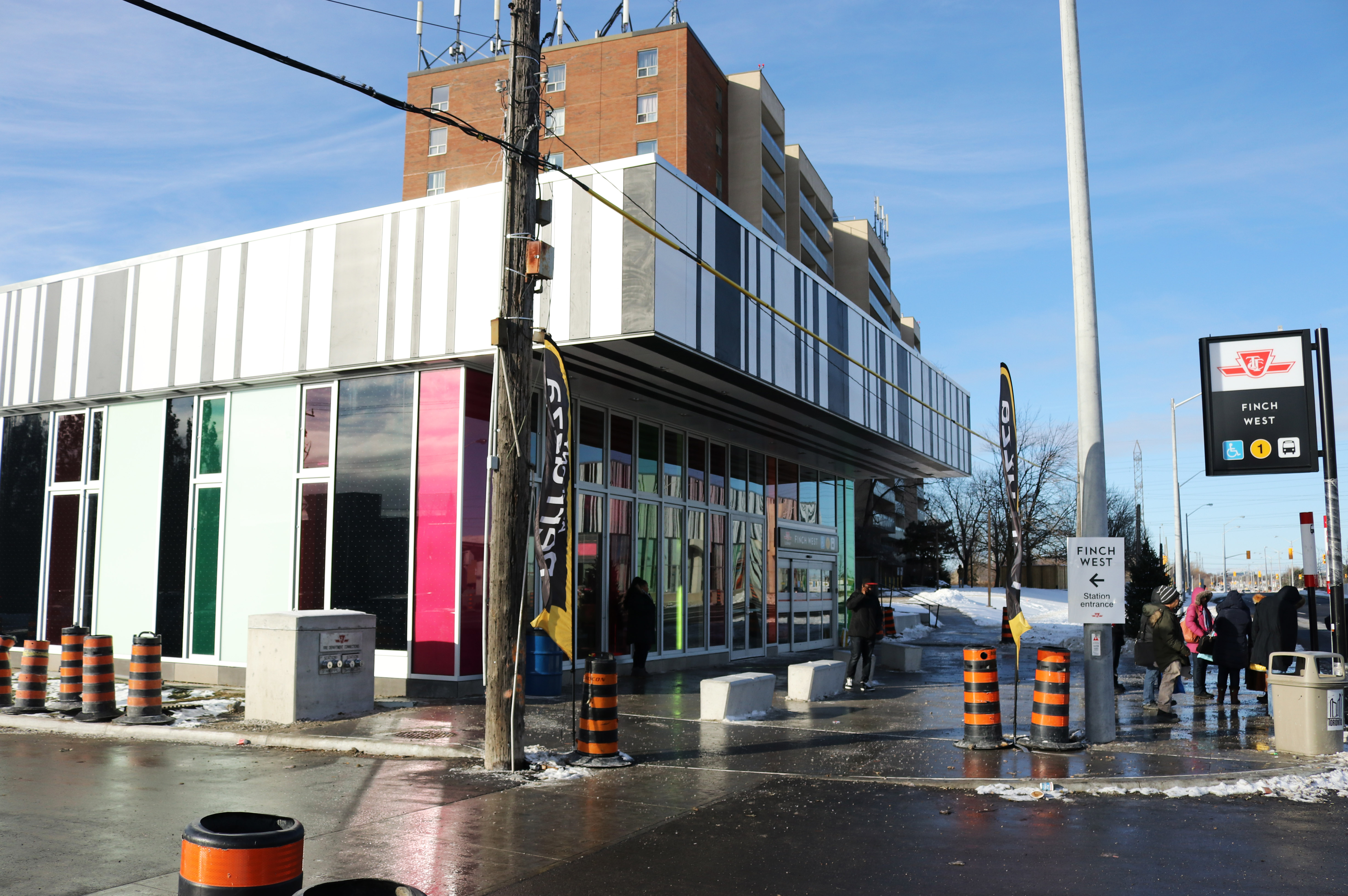
Entrance to Finch West station, a subway station in the neighbourhood.

Several major roadways pass through the neighbourhood including north–south Keele Street, and east–west roadways Finch and Sheppard Avenue. To the north, the neighbourhood is bounded by Steeles Avenue.

=== Public transit ===
Public transportation in the neighbourhood is provided by the Toronto Transit Commission (TTC). The TTC operates a number of public transportation services, including bus routes, and the Toronto subway. Three subway stations of Line 1 Yonge–University are located in the neighbourhood, Pioneer Village station on Steeles Avenue, York University station, and Finch West station on Finch Avenue. Pioneer Village station also provides access to York Region Transit bus routes.

Until March 18, 2020, the neighbourhood was also serviced by York University GO Station, a railway station on GO Transit's Barrie line, located east of the university campus. The station was permanently closed due to low passenger usage.
