= Pearson Regional Transit Centre =

Proposed transit hub in Ontario, Canada

General information
- Location: Mississauga, Ontario; Canada
- Coordinates: 43°41′20″N 79°36′58″W
- Owner: Greater Toronto Airports Authority

History
- Opening: TBA (estimated early 2030s)
Location

The Pearson Regional Transit Centre (French: Station de transport régional Pearson), also known as Union Station West, is a proposed second major intermodal transportation hub to serve the Greater Toronto Area. The transit hub will be located at the site of Viscount station currently serving the Terminal Link across from Toronto Pearson International Airport in Mississauga, Ontario. The transit hub will be accommodated with a new passenger and processing facility known as Terminal New. It will handle functions such as check-in, security screenings and baggage claim. The transit hub will also be at the centre of a new mixed-used area including office, retail and commercial space. The plan is to bring Line 5 Eglinton, Line 6 Finch West, the Mississauga Transitway, the Kitchener line, the Union Pearson Express, and Terminal Link together into the transit hub and it will relieve Union Station. The transit centre is planned to open in the early 2030s.

== History ==
=== Existing bus service ===
Throughout the airport's history, transit connections to the airport had only been served by buses provided by Toronto Transit Commission (TTC) connecting the airport to subway stations in Toronto, Brampton Transit service to the city of Brampton, MiWay service to the city of Mississauga, GO Transit coaches providing service to Richmond Hill Centre Terminal, Hamilton GO Centre and the Finch GO Bus Terminal and Greyhound Canada providing service to the Toronto Coach Terminal and other cities in Southern Ontario and cities in New York state and Michigan. The buses would serve Terminals 1 and 3 with MiWay service also serving Viscount station.

=== Union Pearson Express ===
In 2003, a plan for an airport rail link connecting Pearson Airport with Union Station was brought forward and the Union Pearson AirLink Group was selected as the successful respondent to finance, design, construct, operate and maintain an airport rail link. However, the plan never came to fruition and Metrolinx took over the project in 2010. Construction of the line began in 2012 and opened to the public on 6 June 2015. It was the first dedicated airport rail link in Canada.

=== Proposal ===
On 7 February 2017, the Greater Toronto Airports Authority (GTAA) unveiled images of the transit centre. The GTAA hopes to cut car traffic and encourage users to get to the airport via public transit. The transit centre would be built over existing parking space for the airport. The GTAA hopes that the development will make Pearson one of the world's mega-hub airports that focused on people travelling to the airport and airport workers. The GTAA hoped to complete the transit hub by 2027 but this has since been pushed back to the early 2030s. In early 2018, the GTAA announced that HOK was selected to design the transit centre and passenger processing facility. HOK will lead a design team that will include Weston Williamson + Partners. An early design shows the platforms for the LRT and GO platforms both underground with the GO platforms on the lowest level and the LRT platforms located one level above but this is subject to change. In late 2019, the GTAA released a whitepaper that explains the reasoning behind the transit hub, how the transit centre can connect with different transit services, and summarizes the need for a second transit hub.

== Proposed transit services ==
=== Line 5 Eglinton ===
Line 5 Eglinton is a light rail line owned by Metrolinx and operated by the Toronto Transit Commission. The 19-kilometre line currently runs from Mount Dennis station to Kennedy station and will be extended to Renforth by 2031. Originally, the line was to be constructed directly to the airport for a length of 33 km but due to funding cuts, the Mount Dennis to Pearson Airport segment was deferred.

In 2016, John Tory brought back the western extension with the line running at-grade through Eglinton Avenue. This was revised in April 2019 when Doug Ford proposed extending the line partially underground instead for a cost of $4.7 billion and a completion date of 2030–2031. In late 2019, the GTAA invested an additional $40 million on top of the existing $38 million to the western extension to the airport. If extended, the line will connect the airport to Old Toronto and all five of the former suburban municipalities within the present City of Toronto, Midtown Toronto and access to Downtown Toronto with a transfer at Cedarvale station.

=== Line 6 Finch West ===
Line 6 Finch West is a light rail line owned by Metrolinx and operated by the Toronto Transit Commission. The line currently runs from Finch West station to Humber College and opened on December 7, 2025. Back in 2009, the TTC studied a potential connection to the Woodbine Racetrack and Pearson Airport, and in 2020, Metrolinx expressed desire to extend Line 6 to Pearson Airport to serve the new regional transit centre. If built, the line will connect Finch West station and Humber College with the airport.

=== Kitchener line ===
The existing Kitchener line runs from Union Station in Toronto to the Kitchener GO Station in Kitchener, Ontario. The GTAA along with Metrolinx is studying a potential connection to the transit centre via a spur connection. Based on initial plans, the spur would be tunneled with an underground station located beneath the transit centre. The GTAA undertook a review of options for linking the Kitchener GO RER corridor to Toronto Pearson. If built, the line will connect the airport with a one-seat ride to Downtown Toronto using future EMUs for the GO Transit Regional Express Rail project via a different alignment than the current UP Express.

=== Mississauga Transitway ===
The Mississauga Transitway is a BRT system running along dedicated bus lanes serving Mississauga and Mississauga City Centre. In the future, the transitway will improve service to the airport including a dedicated transit-only bridge over Ontario Highway 401.

== Other examples of airport regional transit centers ==
- Frankfurt Airport long-distance station
- Aéroport Charles de Gaulle 2 TGV
- Orlando International Airport Intermodal Terminal
- Miami Intermodal Center
- Berlin Brandenburg Airport railway station
- Schiphol Airport railway station
