= Line 6 Finch West =

Light rail line in Toronto, Ontario

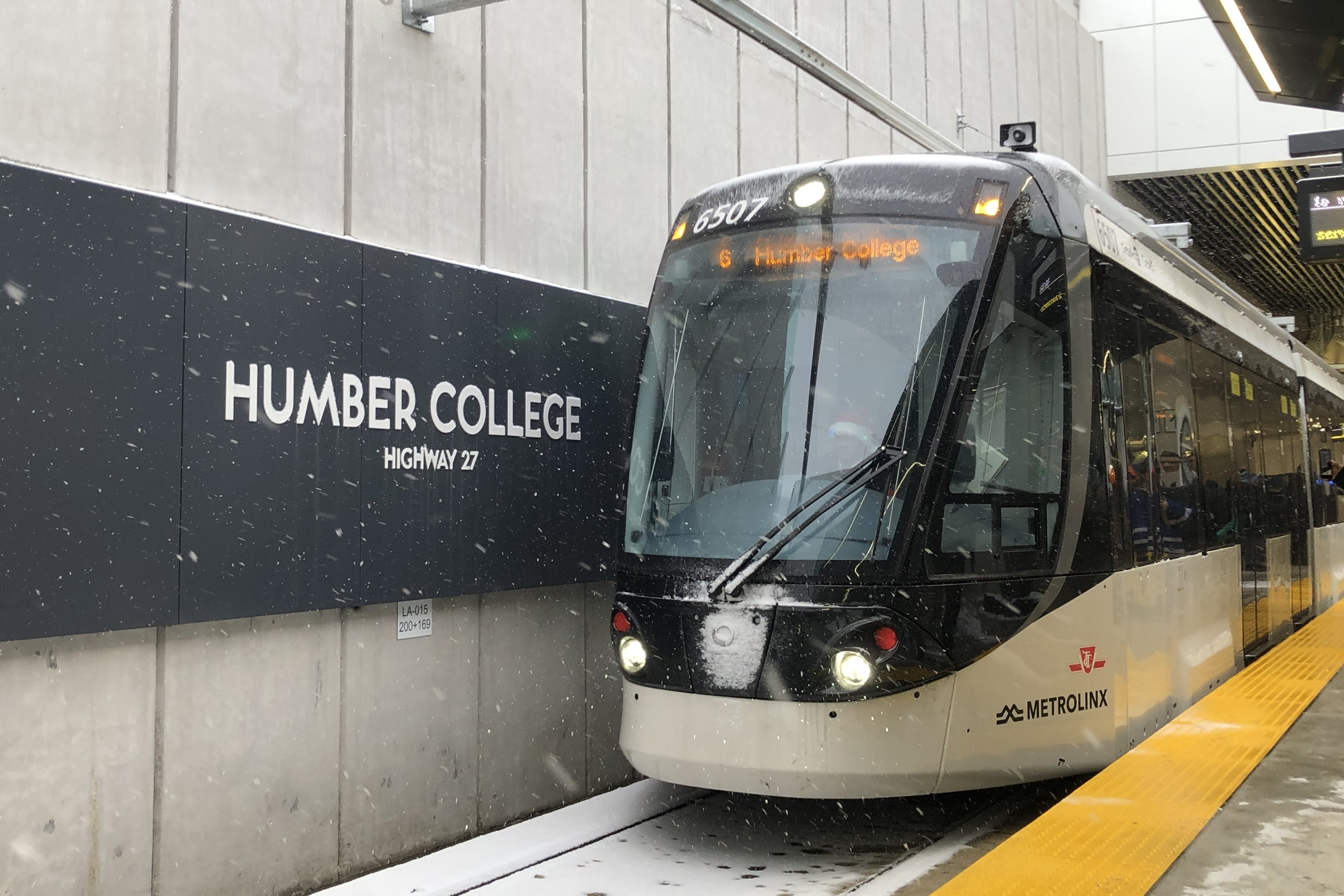
- Citadis Spirit train at Humber College station

Overview
- Status: Operational
- Owner: Metrolinx
- Locale: Toronto, Ontario
- Termini: Humber College; Finch West
- Stations: 18
- Website: Official route page

Service
- Type: Light rail
- System: Toronto subway
- Operator: Toronto Transit Commission
- Depot(s): York Gate Blvd and Norfinch Dr
- Rolling stock: Citadis Spirit

History
- Opened: December 7, 2025; 11 months ago

Technical
- Line length: 10.3 km (6.4 mi)
- Track gauge: 1,435 mm (4 ft 8 1/2 in) standard gauge
- Electrification: Overhead line, 750 V DC
- Operating speed: 60 km/h (37 mph)
- Signalling: Thales SelTrac CBTC
Route map
Line 6 Finch West highlighted in grey

Line 6 Finch West, also known as the Finch West LRT, is a light rail transit line in Toronto, Ontario, Canada. Operated by the Toronto Transit Commission (TTC) as part of the Toronto subway, the 10.3-kilometre (6.4 mi), 18-stop line extends from Finch West station on Line 1 Yonge–University at Keele Street to Humber College station at the North Campus of Humber Polytechnic in the district of Etobicoke. The line operates in a dedicated at-grade right-of-way segregated from street traffic, much of it within the median of Finch Avenue West. It uses standard gauge rather than the broad Toronto gauge used by the three older heavy rail subway lines.

The line is forecast to carry about 14.6 million rides a year or 40,000 a day by 2031. It replaced the 36C Finch West bus route (west from Finch West station) branch, which was one of the three busiest bus routes in Toronto. In the 2010s, the route had approximately 42,600 passengers per weekday, with forecast demand in 2031 that would have resulted in 32 to 39 articulated buses or 45 to 55 standard buses being required to serve the route.

The provincial agency Metrolinx announced in October 2025 that the line had achieved substantial completion, and the TTC officially opened the line on December 7, 2025.

== History ==
=== Early proposals ===
In March 2007, Toronto mayor David Miller announced the 17-kilometre (11 mi) Etobicoke–Finch West LRT as part of the Transit City project to build several light rail lines within the city. The western terminus of the line would be built in the Highway 27 / Humber Polytechnic (then Humber College) area in Etobicoke. The line would run along Finch Avenue West eastward, terminating at Finch station in North York.

On April 1, 2009, the Government of Ontario announced that it would provide funding for construction of this line from Humber College to Don Mills station via Finch West and Finch stations, opening in 2013. In March 2010, the Ontario government budgeted less for building transit. As a result, it eliminated the proposed section of the line east of Finch West station.

In December 2010, Mayor Rob Ford cancelled the line after taking office. However, in February 2012, city council voted to restore the project, along with the Eglinton Crosstown LRT (later renamed Line 5 Eglinton), as part of a new transit plan, restoring some of the elements of the Transit City proposal over Mayor Ford's objections.

In April 2012, Metrolinx proposed to start construction on the Finch West LRT in 2015, with the line opening in 2018. By November 2012, when the city and province signed an LRT master agreement, construction for the line was to begin in 2015 for completion in 2020. In April 2015, the province announced that construction of the line would start in 2016 for completion in 2021.

=== Procurement ===
In September 2015, the Government of Ontario announced that its agency, Infrastructure Ontario, would search for a contractor to design, build, finance and maintain the Finch West LRT – with the successful contractor to be chosen by 2017. In February 2016, Infrastructure Ontario invited three consortia to respond to a request for proposals – Humber Valley Transit Partners (a consortium of SNC-Lavalin and Graham), Mosaic Transit Group (a consortium of ACS Infrastructure Canada, Aecon, and CRH Canada Group) and FACT Partners (a consortium of EllisDon and Bechtel).

In May 2017, Metrolinx confirmed that it had entered into an agreement with Alstom to build 17 (later revised to 18) light rail vehicles (LRVs) for Line 6 Finch West. In September 2017, Metrolinx announced the line would not open until 2022 at the earliest, blaming the delay on uncertainty with the Bombardier vehicle supply.

In April 2018, Mosaic Transit Group was selected to build the transit line. After consultation with Mosaic on a construction schedule, Metrolinx delayed projected completion of the line to 2023, ten years after the originally announced date. That May, Infrastructure Ontario and Metrolinx announced that Mosaic had signed a contract to design, build, and finance the construction of the line and stations, and to maintain them for 30 years after their initial opening.

Effective June 20, 2021, the TTC renumbered the Bay bus route in downtown Toronto from 6 to 19 to free up the route number 6 for the Finch West line.

In 2023, the estimated cost of the line was CA$2.5 billion. As of March 31, 2025, the budgeted cost of the line was $3.585 billion.

=== Construction and testing ===
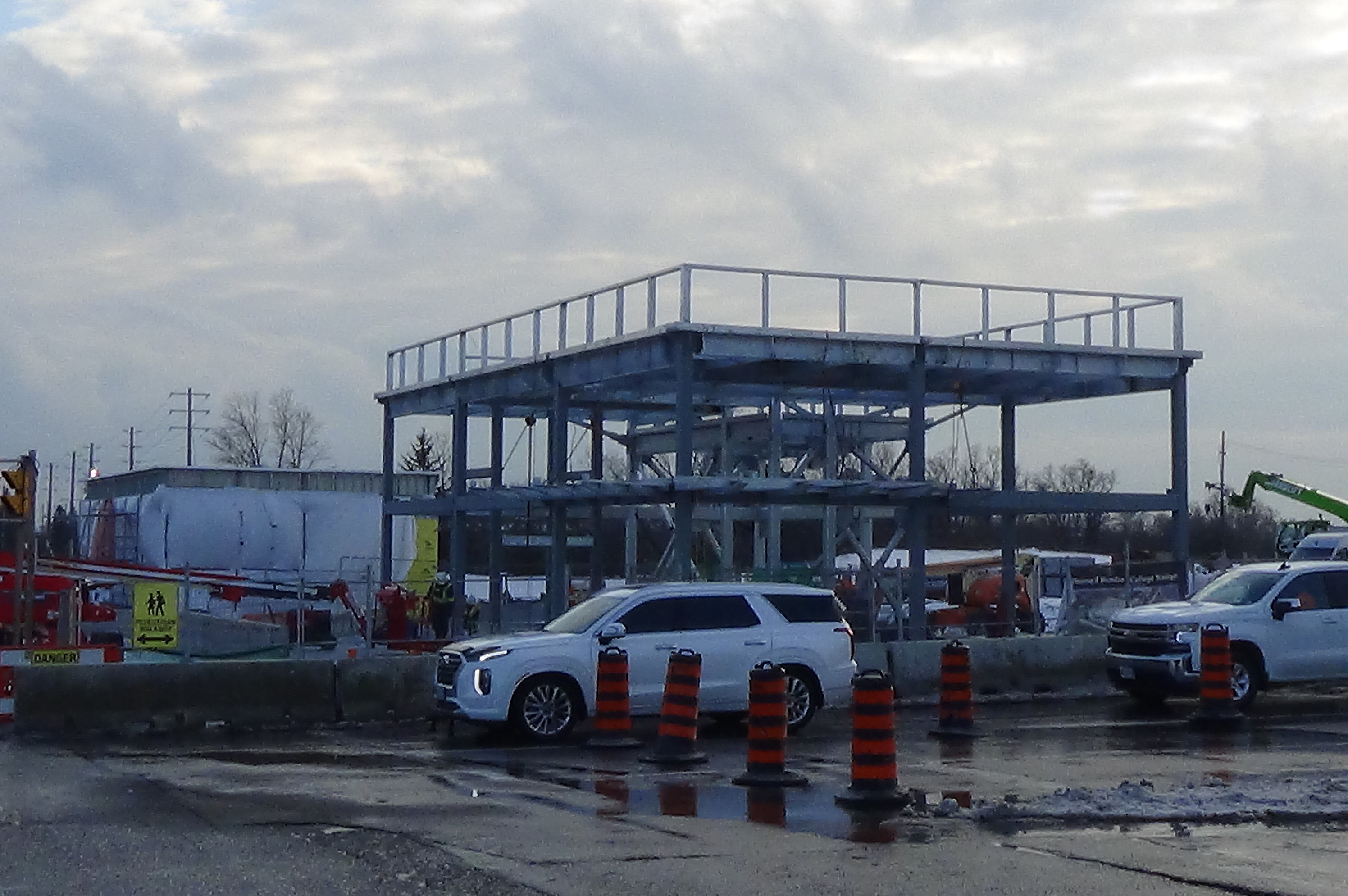
Humber College station under construction in December 2022

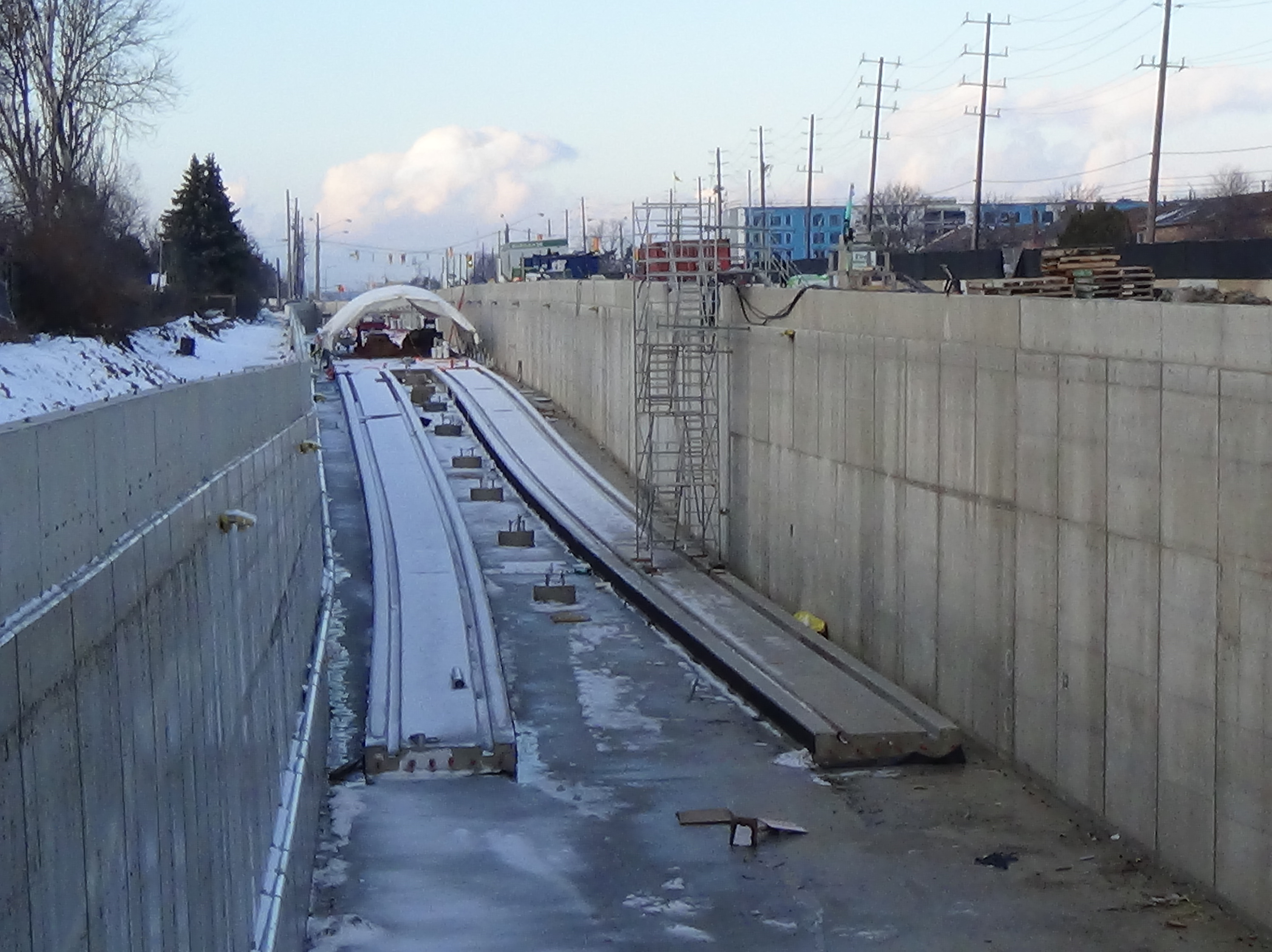
Under-construction track slab in the section descending to Humber College station in December 2022

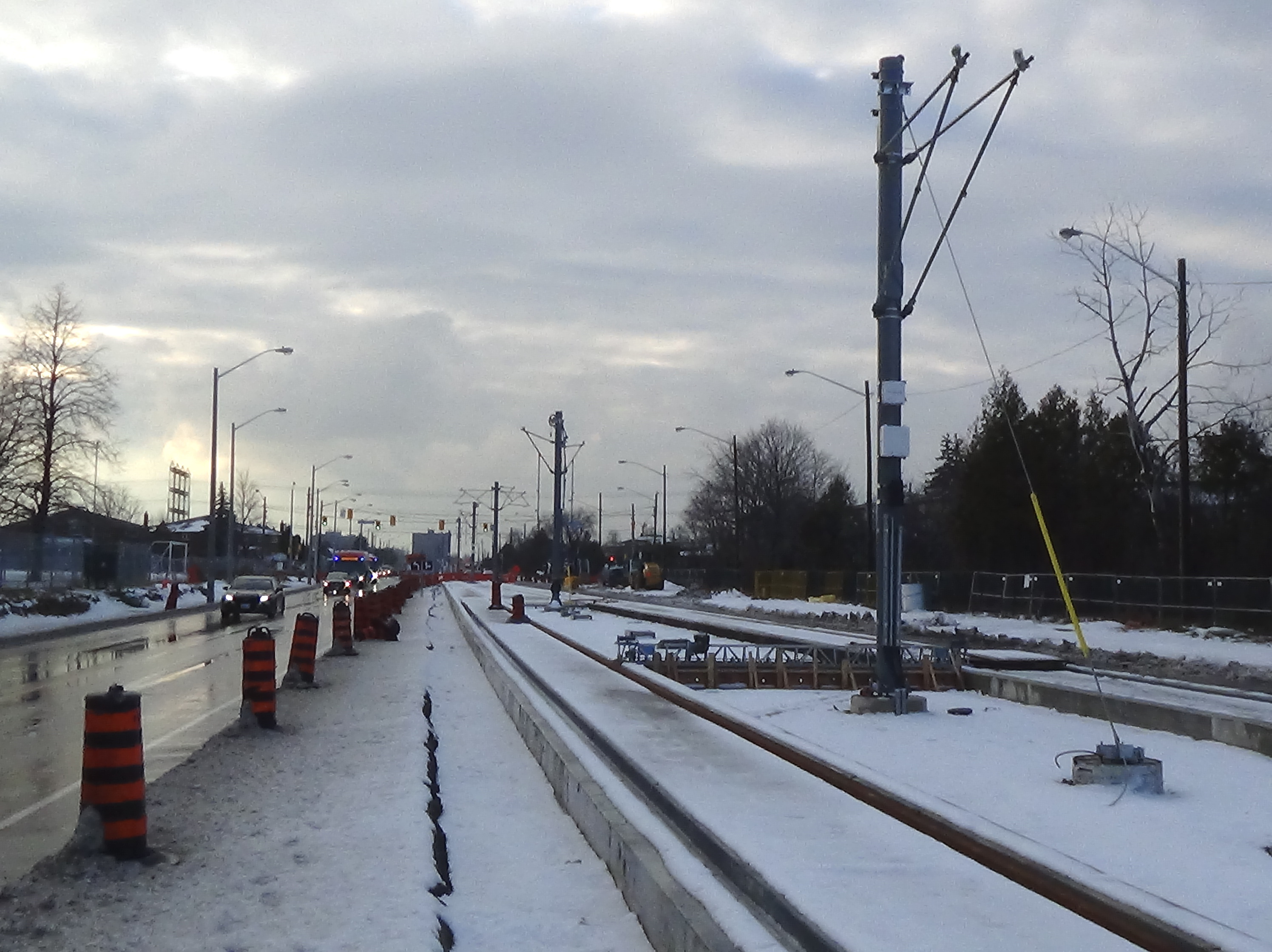
Rail and catenary pole installation at John Garland Boulevard in December 2022

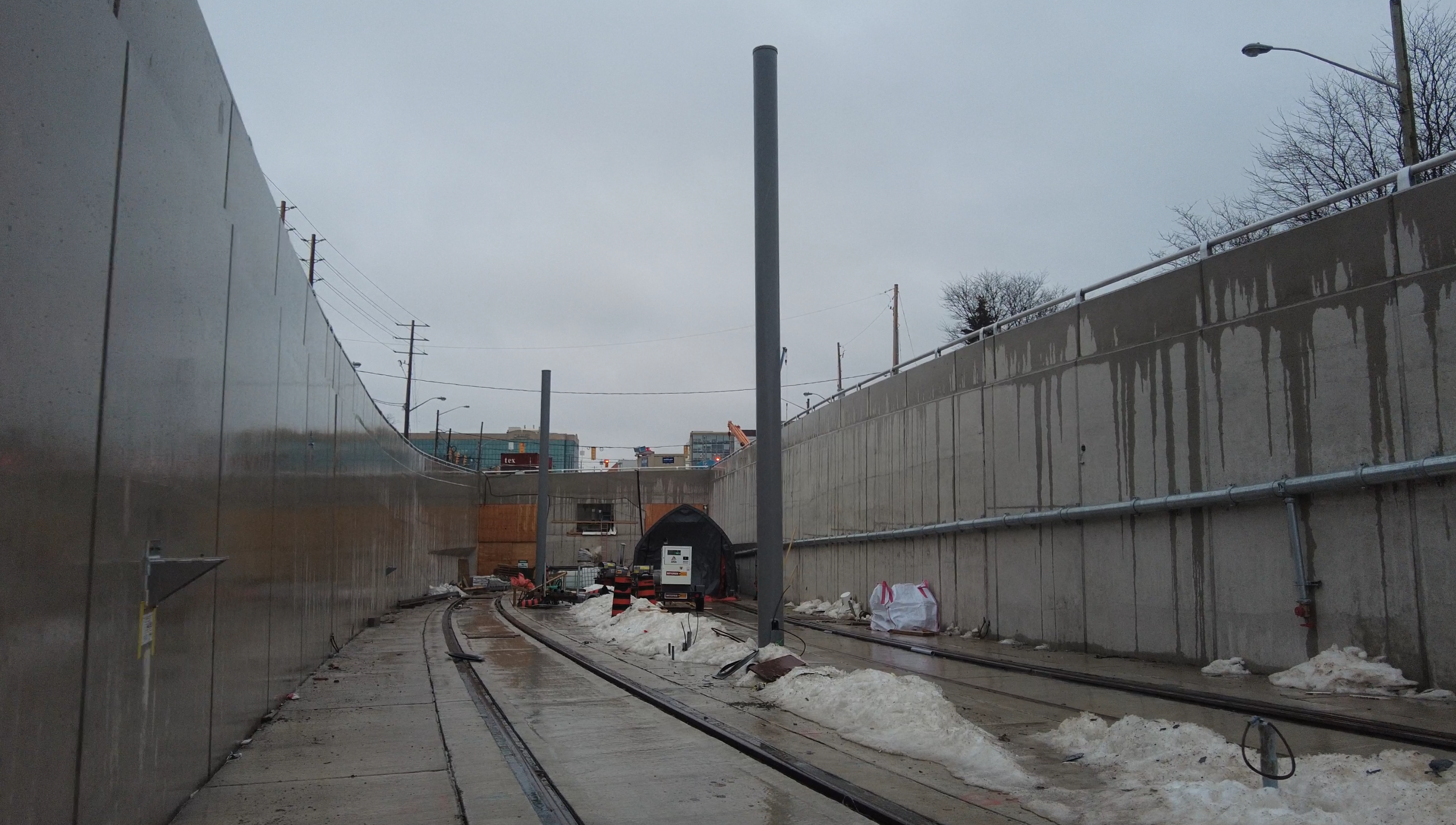
Light rail portal descending into Finch West station under construction in March 2023

Initial preparatory utility works began in 2016. Enbridge Gas Distribution relocated natural gas pipelines lower within the roadway to allow for an appropriate depth beneath the proposed track-bed. Other utility work followed, with replacement and relocation of watermains, hydro poles and hydro cables. In the second quarter of 2019, substantial construction of the project began with work on the maintenance and storage facility (MSF).

Major construction by Mosaic Transit Group began in 2019. In June 2020, the Highway 400 overpasses over Finch Avenue were removed and replaced over two consecutive weekends, using a "rapid bridge replacement" technique. This involved moving the old overpass aside in one piece and installing a new overpass in its place. By late October of that year, the first rails were being installed at the line's new maintenance and storage facility, with the first vehicles scheduled to arrive in mid-2021. That December, Mosaic Transit Partners awarded Bombardier Transportation a 30-year contract to maintain Line 6's light rail vehicles as well as wayside systems such as track and overhead catenary. Bombardier was also chosen to maintain the fleet and wayside systems for Line 5 Eglinton in a different contract.

In January 2021, the first of 11 traction power substations to power the trains was installed. This substation would power an initial 1,800-metre (5,900 ft) section of track between Norfinch Road / Oakdale Drive and Sentinel Road to allow for train testing. Later that month, the first vehicle test was carried out at the MSF. During the test, a vehicle travelled 700 m (2,300 ft) at speeds between 2 km/h (1.2 mph) and 5 km/h (3.1 mph). In February 2022, an LRV made a 700-metre (2,300 ft) trip from the MSF along York Gate Boulevard onto Finch Avenue.

By May 2022, Mosaic Transit Group had laid about 35 percent of the 25.6 kilometres (15.9 mi) of the total track required to complete the line. Besides the double-track mainline, the total track to be laid included crossovers, pocket tracks, and MSF trackage. Mosaic had already laid 1.8 kilometres (1.1 mi) of track on the mainline between Pelican Gate (near the MSF) and Sentinel Road, which, starting May 20, was to be used for LRV testing with speeds up to 60 kilometres per hour (37 mph). By September 1 of that year, 47 percent of mainline track had been laid. By November, the first eight of 116 platform canopies and the first two of 29 electrical cabinets to power lights, fare machines, and security systems along the line were installed at the Driftwood stop.

By March 2023, 56 of the 116 canopies had been installed, 75 percent of the catenary poles had been installed and 50 percent of the mainline track had been laid. By October, all rail and overhead catenary had been installed, and all 18 light rail vehicles had received their final acceptance, and by November, all platform canopies had been installed. In May 2024, the first light rail vehicle made a test run along the entire line, from Finch West station to Humber College station, with speeds up to 60 km/h (37 mph). By September of that year, construction was complete for all stations and stops, with only the testing and commissioning phase remained to be completed.

On August 15, 2024, Mosaic Transit Group filed a lawsuit against the provincial government alleging that when the Toronto Transit Commission had been designated the line's operator, some terms in an agreement between Metrolinx and Mosaic were violated. Mosaic alleged that the agreement between Metrolinx and the TTC was interfering with the completion of the line. Mosaic expected the TTC to "facilitate effective implementation of maintenance and operational requirements once the line commences service".

Previously, in July 2023, it had been expected that Line 6 would open within the first half of 2024, but by December 2023, the TTC made the assumption for budget purposes that the line would open no earlier than September 2024; the builder, Mosaic Transit Group, expected the line to open by the end of 2024. But by early December 2024, Councillor Jamaal Myers, chairman of the TTC board, stated that the commission did not expect the line to open before June 2025 at the earliest.

=== Implementation ===
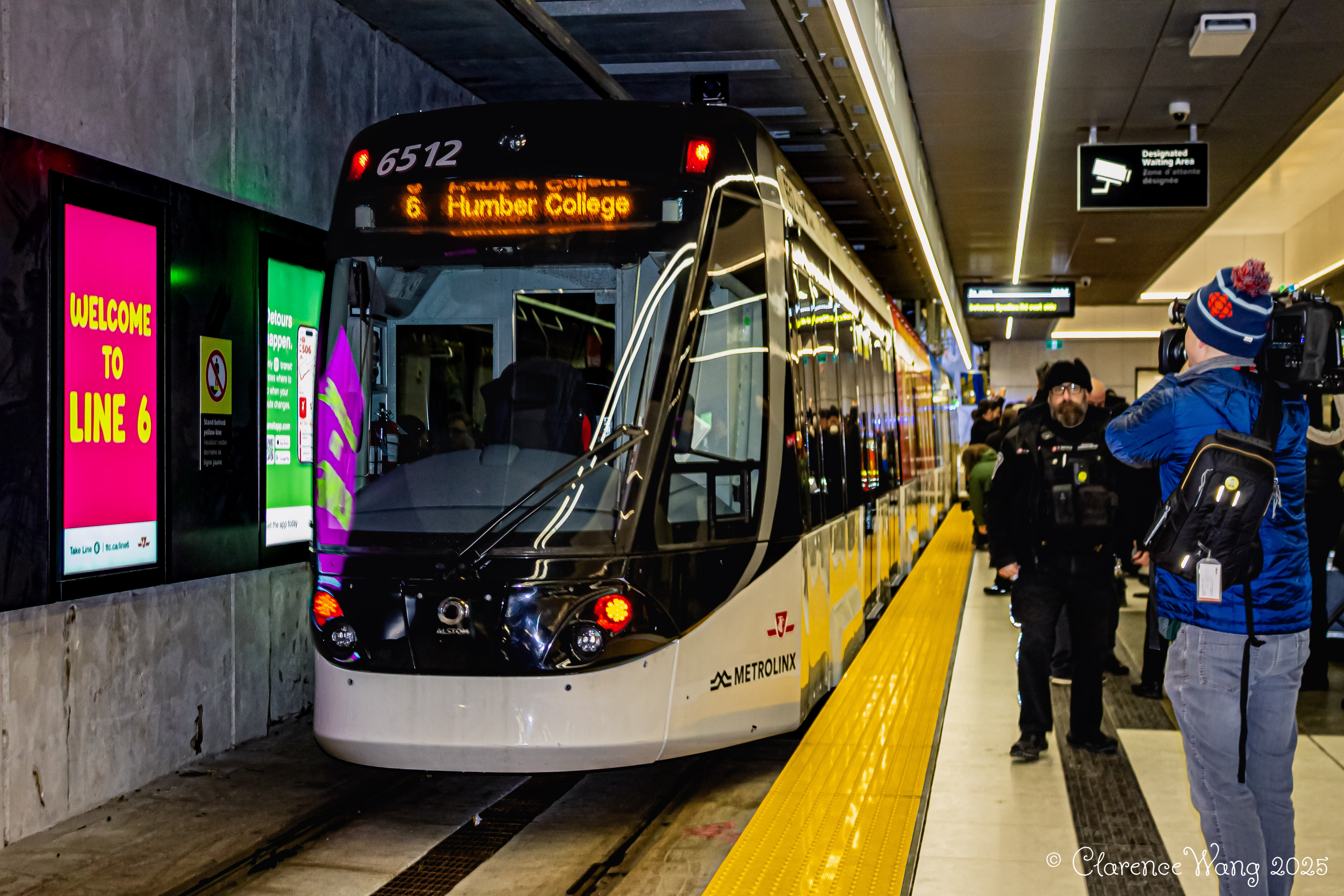
An LRV at Finch West station on opening day, December 7, 2025

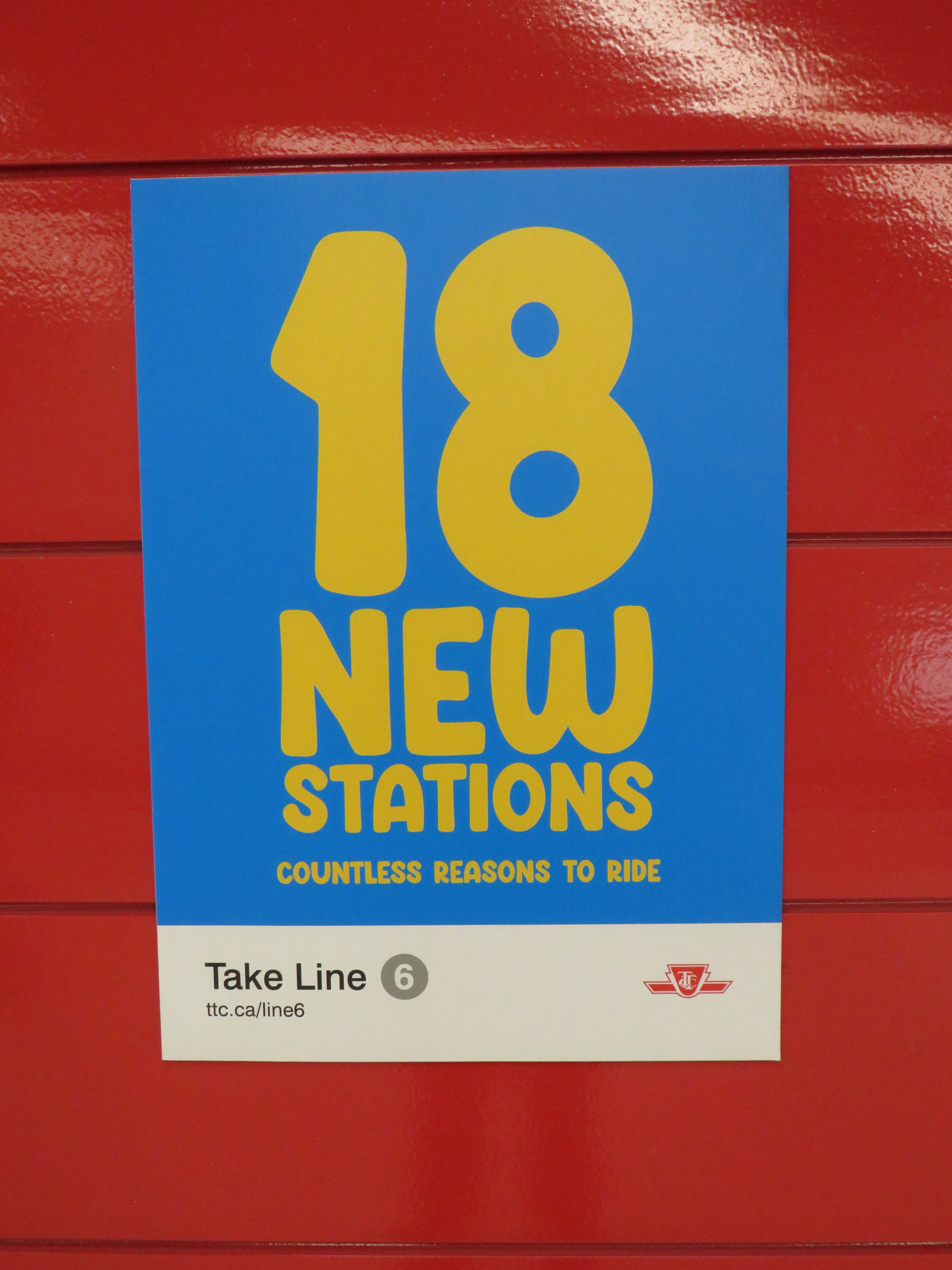
Sign advertising the new line several months after opening in March 2026

In early September 2025, Metrolinx transferred operational control of Line 6 to the TTC. The TTC's transit control centre at the Hillcrest Complex became responsible for the line's operation. Mosaic Transit Group continued to maintain the line. Starting the weekend of September 20, the TTC planned to begin a 30-day revenue demonstration test without passengers. Up to 15 trains would operate every five minutes during peak hours, and every seven to ten minutes during off-peak hours. In late October, Metrolinx announced that the 30-day test had been successfully completed and that the line would be turned over to the TTC no later than November 3. On November 24, 2025, the TTC officially announced that the line would open on December 7, 2025.

The TTC planned a soft opening for the line. Until the second quarter of 2026, the line would end daily service at 10 pm to give Mosaic Transit Group extra time for maintenance and to monitor for operating issues. This would avoid the severe startup problems that occurred on the Confederation Line of the O-Train in Ottawa. The TTC would run 15 LRVs during peak periods providing a frequency of 6 minutes and 30 seconds. The off-peak frequency would be every 10 to 12 minutes. Bus substitution would be used between 10 pm and 1 am the following calendar day. As part of the soft opening, trains would operate at less than the originally promised speeds and frequency. The city and Metrolinx had agreed to a speed limit of 25 kilometres per hour (16 mph) for trains going through intersections and approaching stops.

During initial operations in December 2025, passengers told media that vehicle speeds were very slow. According to CBC News, it took 55 minutes to finish an entire westbound trip, and 47 minutes eastbound. During the testing phase, the scheduled time was 46 minutes. During planning for the line, Metrolinx had promised a 33-minute run time. At its opening, the line was using "conditional" transit signal priority that activates only if the train is behind schedule. Trains were being trapped by red lights because they could not extend green lights at an intersection and were not allowed through said intersections, having to defer to left-turning vehicles. It was also observed that trains would dwell for 45 to 90 seconds at on-street stop after the doors had closed for departure. After opening, the round-trip target time became 98 minutes but actual round-trip times could be as much as 120 minutes. Following a motion by Mayor Olivia Chow on December 16, city council instructed the city manager to work with the TTC and Metrolinx to implement "more aggressive" transit signal priority along Line 6. On December 10, the TTC board had adopted a similar motion. The TTC was also looking at dwell times at stops.

For the 29 days of service following its opening, Line 6 had service interruptions on 14 of those days for various reasons, such as mechanical problems, intruders, and debris on the tracks. On January 12, 2026, a switch heater blew a fuse after an electrical power surge, resulting in a three-hour suspension of service. As a result of a major snowstorm on January 15, 2026, the line was closed for a day and a half.

Track switches on Line 6 have frequently malfunctioned during winter weather conditions such as icy rain and snow storms because of their electric heaters. The O-Train Confederation Line initially used such heaters, which also resulted in severe problems, but had them replaced with gas-powered heaters. Metrolinx claimed that gas- or hot-air powered heaters could not be used because, unlike the O-Train line, Line 6 is at street level and is crossed by pedestrians and road traffic. In contrast, Line 5 Eglinton uses a combination of gas and electric switch heaters because sections of the Line 5 track are embedded in concrete where hot-air switch heaters can be used.

By mid-March 2026, the city had made changes to traffic light signals along Finch Avenue to give Line 6 trains priority over left-turning road traffic. Effective March 15, trains would also operate between 10 pm and 1 am, eliminating the temporary late evening bus substitution. By May 2026, Metrolinx reported that, since the line's opening, on-time performance had increased by 25 percent and that the round-trip travel time had been reduced by 16 minutes.

Over the 2026 Victoria Day weekend, buses replaced LRVs for infrastructure upgrades that would winterize the line and avoid the winter-related issues that occurred multiple times during the line's first winter.

== Route ==
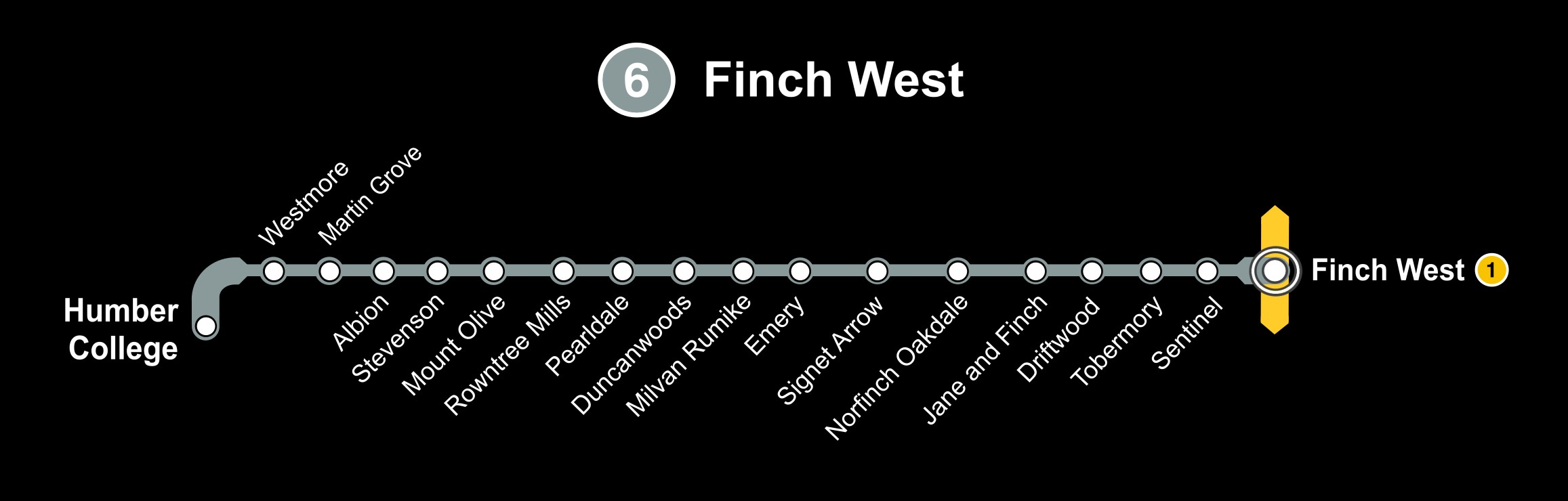
Schematic map of Line 6 Finch West, with thick lines indicating tunnelled and below-grade sections

=== Route description ===
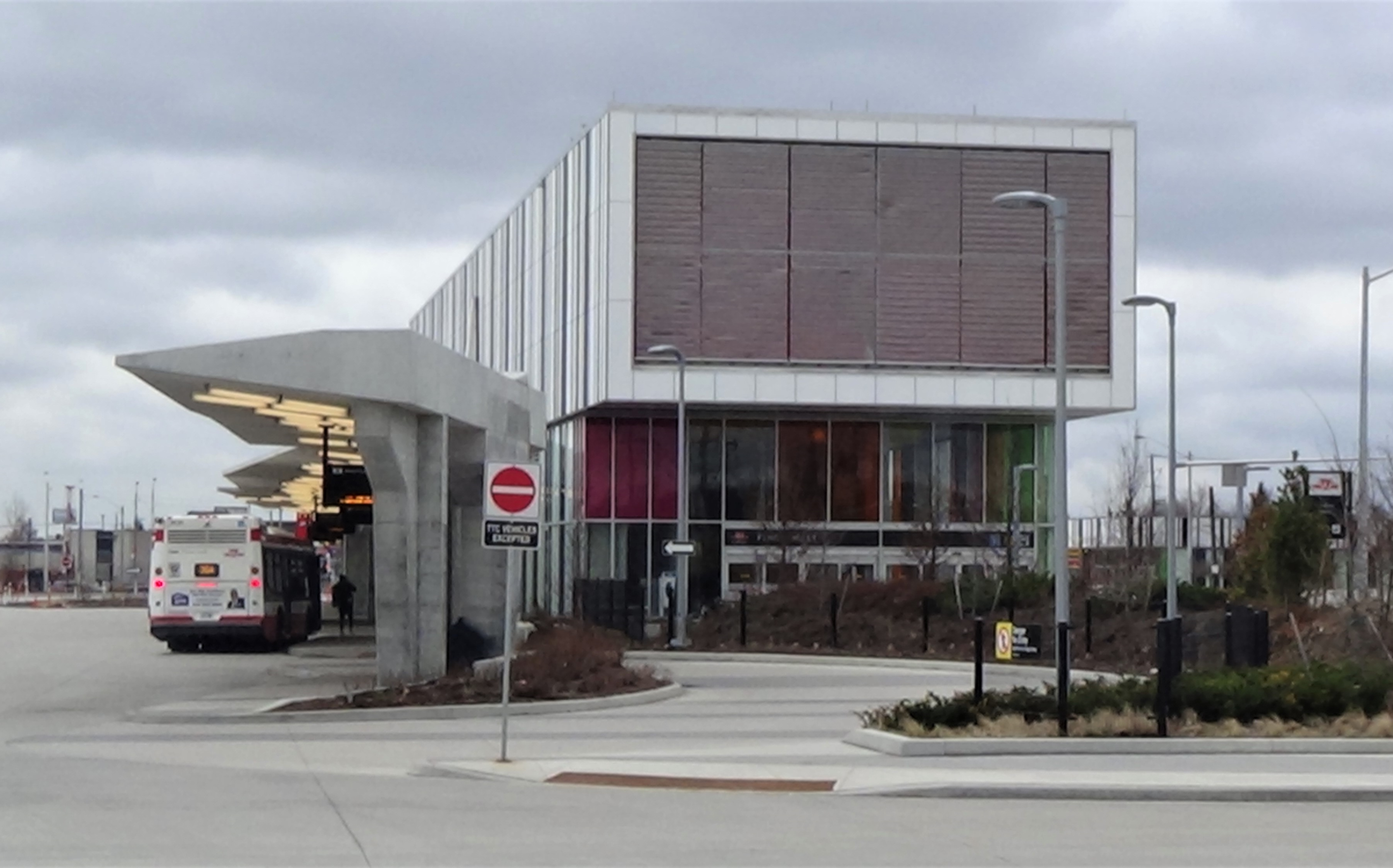
Finch West station on Line 1 Yonge–University is the eastern terminus of the line

From west to east, the 10.3-kilometre (6.4 mi) line runs from Humber Polytechnic's North Campus at Highway 27 in northern Etobicoke, starting at Humber College station (which uses the institution's former name), to Finch West station on the University branch of Line 1 Yonge–University, at Keele Street in North York. Between the two terminals, there are 16 on-street stops, all along Finch Avenue, where tracks run in the middle of the street, segregated from traffic. In mid-block sections, the street is 36 metres (118 ft) wide, with the LRT right-of-way being about 8 metres (26 ft) wide. The line has six intermediate turnback points in addition to the turnbacks at the two terminal stations.

From its western terminal at Humber College station, the line runs north in a trench along the west side of Highway 27 to its intersection with Finch Avenue, where the line curves east in a short tunnel under the intersection and rises to street level along Finch Avenue.

On Finch Avenue east of Highway 27, there are two centre-reserved lanes for the LRT flanked by two traffic lanes in each direction as well as bicycle lanes. The Westmore stop is the first stop (from west to east) of 16 along the route.

After passing the Martin Grove stop, the line circumvents the north side of the Albion Centre shopping mall (Note: The Albion Centre (a.k.a. the Albion Mall) is a shopping centre on a triangular site bounded by Albion Road on the west, Kipling Avenue on the east and Finch Avenue on its north edge with three stops: Albion, Stevenson and Mount Olive (Kipling Avenue).) with three stops: Albion, Stevenson and Mount Olive located within a distance of about 800 metres (2,625 ft).

At the Rowntree Mills stop, the line crosses the Humber River where Islington Avenue and Finch Avenue intersect on a bridge over the river with far-side stops on opposite sides of the river. (Note: The Humber River is the boundary between the Etobicoke and North York districts of Toronto.)

The line passes the Pearldale, Duncanwoods, Milvan Rumike, Emery, and Signet Arrow stops before passing under Highway 400. One block east of the Norfinch Oakdale stop, at York Gate Boulevard, there is a wye junction to the line's maintenance and storage facility. The next stop, Jane and Finch, is a transfer point for the 35 Jane bus, which was the TTC's fifth busiest bus route in 2018. (Note: As of 2021, the TTC was planning to install "priority bus lanes" on Jane Street. A Jane LRT was once considered for Jane Street. Both would serve the Jane and Finch neighbourhood.)

After passing the Driftwood and Tobermory stops, Line 6 runs over Black Creek and the Sentinel stop is the last on-street stop before the line's eastern terminus. About 500 m (1,600 ft) east of the Sentinel stop, opposite Romfield Lane and adjacent to James Cardinal McGuigan Catholic High School, the line descends into a tunnel under Keele Street to terminate at Finch West station.

The line serves several neighbourhoods along its route. Between Highway 27 and the Humber River, the line serves the Rexdale neighbourhood of Etobicoke, which includes the Mount Olive–Silverstone–Jamestown neighbourhood (also known as Smithfield). There are five on-street stops in the neighbourhood excluding the Rowntree Mills stop, which straddles the Etobicoke / North York boundary at the Humber River. Between the Humber River and Highway 400 in North York, the line serves the Humber Summit neighbourhood on the north side of Finch Avenue and Humbermede on the south side. There are five on-street stops in this area again, excluding Rowntree Mills. Between Highway 400 and Keele Street (Finch West station), the line serves the Jane and Finch neighbourhood, which includes its namesake stop along with four other on-street stops.

=== Stations and stops ===
| Station/stop | Type | Platform (Note: Stops use one of the following platform configurations: Centre Centre or island platform serving both tracks Parallel Two parallel side platforms facing one another on the same side of a street intersection Far-side Two side platforms each located separately at the far side of an intersection There are no near-side platforms on Line 6 Finch West.) | Notes | Connections | Image |
|---|---|---|---|---|---|
| Humber College | Open trench | Centre | On Humber Polytechnic North Campus at Highway 27 south of Finch Avenue; the station name refers to the institution's former name. | Humber College Bus terminal | |
| Westmore | On-street | Parallel | East side | 96D Wilson; 927 Highway 27 Express; MiWay; York Region Transit; Brampton Transit | |
| Martin Grove | On-street | Centre | West side | 46 Martin Grove; 927 Highway 27 Express; York Region Transit | |
| Albion | On-street | Far-side | | 73C Royal York; York Region Transit | |
| Stevenson | On-street | Centre | Parallel to Stevenson Road between Albion Road and Kipling Avenue | 45 Kipling; 73C Royal York; 945 Kipling Express; York Region Transit | |
| Mount Olive | On-street | Centre | At Kipling Avenue, east side | 45 Kipling; 945 Kipling Express; York Region Transit | |
| Rowntree Mills | On-street | Far-side | At Islington Avenue | 37B Islington; 937 Islington Express; York Region Transit | |
| Pearldale | On-street | Parallel | West side | | |
| Duncanwoods | On-street | Parallel | East side | | |
| Milvan Rumike | On-street | Far-side | At Milvan Drive and Rumike Road | 119B Torbarrie; 166 Toryork | |
| Emery | On-street | Far-side | At Weston Road; named after the historic hamlet of Emery | 119B Torbarrie; 165 Weston Road North; 166 Toryork; 989 Weston Express | |
| Signet Arrow | On-street | Far-side | At Signet Drive and Arrow Road | 84C Sheppard West; 99 Arrow Road; 119B Torbarrie | |
| Norfinch Oakdale | On-street | Far-side | At Norfinch Drive and Oakdale Road; near maintenance facility | 84D Sheppard West; 99 Arrow Road | |
| Jane and Finch | On-street | Far-side | At Jane Street; named after the Jane and Finch neighbourhood | 35 Jane; 99 Arrow Road; 935 Jane Express | |
| Driftwood | On-street | Far-side | | 108 Driftwood | |
| Tobermory | On-street | Far-side | | | |
| Sentinel | On-street | Far-side | | 106 Sentinel | |
| Finch West | Underground | Centre | Subway station at Keele Street | Line 1 Yonge–University; TTC buses | |
Phase 3 (preliminary design)
| Rexdale | TBD | TBD | At Woodbine Mall on Highway 27 at Rexdale Blvd | TTC buses | |
| Woodbine Racetrack | TBD | TBD | At Woodbine Racetrack in between Highway 27 and Highway 427 | TTC buses; Kitchener Line | |
| Pearson Airport | TBD | TBD | Located at Toronto Pearson International Airport at Viscount Road | Line 5 Eglinton; TTC buses; Kitchener Line; Union Pearson Express; Mississauga Transitway; Terminal Link; Toronto Pearson International Airport | |

In January 2018, to avoid naming conflicts with existing TTC and GO stations in Toronto, a consultation process was initiated to select unique names for the stops at Jane, Kipling, Islington, and Weston; the initial suggestions were Jane and Finch, Mount Olive, Thistletown, and Emery Village, respectively. Based on public feedback, Rowntree Mills was also considered, and ultimately selected, for the stop at Islington, while Emery was chosen as the name for the stop at Weston.

== Design ==
The line has been designed by Arup, DTAH and Perkins&Will – as part of the Mosaic Transit Group consortium. The line is built with 18 stops, of which 16 are on-street. Each platform is 48 metres (157 ft) long, the length of an LRT vehicle. Finch West station is built as a double-length underground station with a centre platform for Line 6.

All stops and the two terminal stations use transparent glass for walls, partitions and skylights. The terminal stops use transparent glass for elevators and their shafts. This design adheres to crime prevention through environmental design standards to create a bright and safe environment for riders. Using glass takes advantage of natural light to provide a more attractive environment for riders while minimizing the use of artificial lighting when possible.

The on-street stops have canopies, lights, fare machines, cameras and a PA system. Each station and stop has four screens as part of a passenger information system. The screens provide arrival times and any news about service on the line, as well as third-party outdoor advertising provided by Astral Media, while Pattison is responsible for third-party advertising at Finch West and Humber College stations. Platforms also have intercoms for general assistance and emergencies. There are electrical cabinets at each stop to power electrical equipment and to provide backup power in case of an outage.

== Operations ==
A Line 6 LRV during testing along Finch Avenue, April 2025

The line is operated by the Toronto Transit Commission and maintained by Mosaic Transit Group as part of the public–private partnership contract with Metrolinx. A fleet of 18 Citadis Spirit vehicles are used on the line. Dedicated tracks separated from traffic and transit signal priority at intersections allow the line to provide service 20 percent faster than buses in mixed traffic, as well as increase reliability due to its segregation from traffic. The line would also remove 35 morning and 29 afternoon peak period buses from existing traffic lanes.

According to Metrolinx, Line 6 has a frequency of every five to seven minutes during peak hours and seven to ten minutes at off-peak times. The estimated travel time between terminals is 38 minutes. Bicycles are allowed on board, stored in the bicycle racks inside the vehicles, during the off-peak hours.

The maximum operating speed for vehicles on the mainline is 60 kilometres per hour (37 mph). The line has nine traction power substations stored in pre-built structures along the line.

The line is expected to carry about 42,600 passengers per weekday. By 2031, projected ridership is around 2,800 passengers per hour in the peak direction. Annual operating and maintenance costs were estimated to be $51.5 million in 2022 before deducting fare revenue and costs saved by eliminating parallel bus service.

=== Maintenance and storage facility ===
Finch West LRT Maintenance and Storage Facility
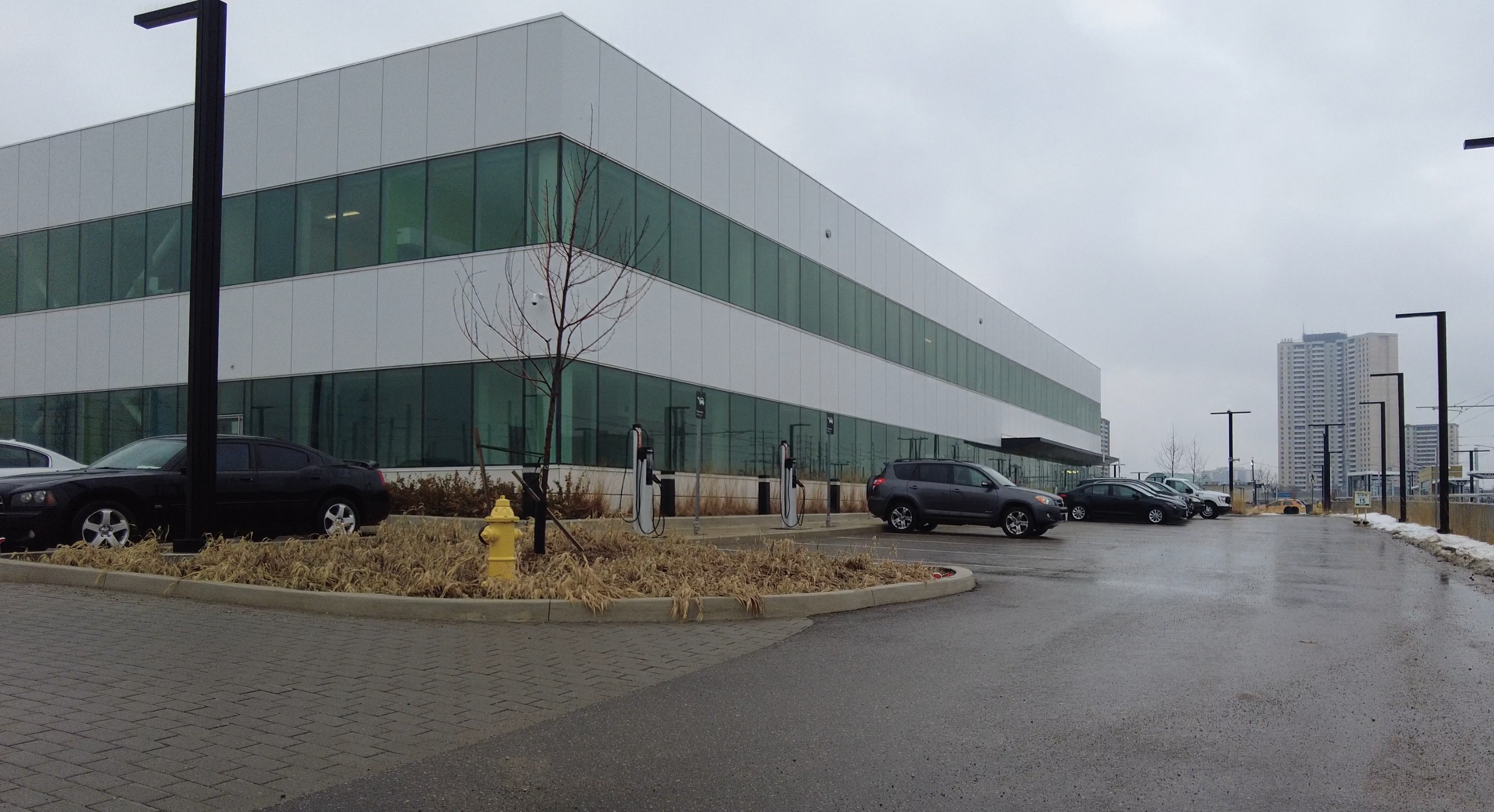

General information
- Location: 50 York Gate Boulevard; Toronto, Ontario; Canada
- Coordinates: 43°45′27″N 79°31′23″W
- Owner: Metrolinx
- Operator: Mosaic Transit Group (under contract to Metrolinx)

Construction
- Structure type: Maintenance and storage facility

Other information
- Status: Open

History
- Opened: 2021 (facility)
Location

Metrolinx has constructed a maintenance and storage facility (MSF) on a lot on the north side of Finch Avenue West between York Gate Boulevard and Norfinch Drive next to Monsignor Fraser College's Norfinch Campus. The MSF will have facilities to service the Citadis Spirit light rail vehicles used on the line, as well as the line trackage.

The 100,000-square-metre (1,100,000 sq ft) site will include a maintenance building with an area of 10,000 square metres (110,000 sq ft), open-air storage for up to 26 LRVs, a car wash facility, materials storage, an administration building and a traction power substation. The facility will have 4.4 kilometres (2.7 mi) of track, including both exterior storage and interior tracks. There is also 600 metres (2,000 ft) of track to connect the MSF to Finch Avenue via York Gate Boulevard. Once the line is opened for revenue service, LRVs leaving the facility will be able to enter service either in an eastbound or westbound direction.

Construction of the facility started in 2019, and the MSF was ready to receive its first LRV by the end of July 2021. With completion of the MSF, Mosaic Transit Group will start to test LRVs and the communication system. In late 2021, a section of the line from the MSF to Sentinel Road was energized for up to 18 months of testing.

In July 2020, Metrolinx was criticized for proposing to sell off land in the Jane and Finch neighbourhood located in front of the MSF, contrary to initial promises to local community groups. A 32-metre-wide (105 ft) strip of land along Finch Avenue was being used as a construction staging area by Mosaic Transit Group. In March 2021, Metrolinx cancelled their proposal and agreed to provide the land at zero cost to allow for the construction of a community hub by the City of Toronto and the local community, following completion of the line's construction.

== Rolling stock ==
The fleet for the line consists of 18 Citadis Spirit light rail vehicles. The vehicles are 48 metres (157 ft) long, with a seating capacity of 120 passengers and a maximum capacity of 292. Each LRV has four wheelchair positions and bicycle racks for two bicycles. There are no designated areas for strollers or other large objects with wheels, but these can be parked at locations with fold-up seats. Each vehicle weighs 81 tonnes (89 tons).

The trains were ordered in May 2017 by Metrolinx, as part of a joint order of 121 trains for the Hurontario LRT in neighbouring Mississauga and the Finch West LRT, at cost of $528 million. The trains are being built at an Alstom plant in Brampton. The first vehicle was assembled in September 2020 and arrived from Alstom at the MSF in two sections on July 28 and 29, 2021. The second LRV arrived in two sections on November 12, 2021. A third vehicle arrived in 2022. After joining the two delivered sections, the vehicles are run around the MSF yard initially at 5 km/h (3.1 mph), then each vehicle is tested by running it around the yard for 600 kilometres (370 mi) without a defect occurring.

The same type of vehicles will be used for the Hurontario LRT. The line was originally supposed to use the same Bombardier Flexity Freedom trains as Line 5 Eglinton; however, this order was cancelled by Metrolinx following delivery delays by Bombardier.

== Potential extensions ==
Several extensions to the line have been proposed; however, as of 2025, none of the proposed extensions had been funded for design or construction.

=== Finch West station to Finch station ===
The line was originally planned to extend from Finch West station to Finch station on the Yonge leg of Line 1 as part of the original municipal Transit City proposal as well as The Big Move. This segment was included in the 2010 environmental assessment of the line. In March 2010, the Ontario government eliminated the proposed section of the line between Finch West and Finch because of budget constraints.

In 2013, this plan was revived as an "unfunded future rapid transit project" in the City of Toronto's "Feeling Congested?" report, indicating that this extension may be constructed sometime in the future. The extension was later shown in the TTC's 2018 Corporate Plan with no timeline for completion.

At its February 20, 2020, meeting, the Metrolinx board of directors endorsed a prioritization framework for a proposed frequent rapid transit network that included a proposed LRT extension to Finch station. With a forecast ridership of 6,600 in 2031 and a proposed line length of 6.3 kilometres (3.9 mi) along Finch Avenue West, the project scored "high" with a preliminary benefit–cost ratio of 0.36 to 0.65. On March 20, 2024, City of Toronto staff presented a report to city council on corridor evaluation results for the prioritization of planned higher-order transit projects, which scored the extension to Finch station as "middle priority".

=== Humber College station to Pearson International Airport ===
In 2009, the TTC was studying the feasibility of potential routings for a future southward extension of the Etobicoke–Finch West LRT to the vicinity of Woodbine Live development, Woodbine Mall (formerly Woodbine Centre), and Pearson International Airport. The airport is located in Mississauga but within the Toronto fare zone.

This extension was later reclassified as a future transit project as described in the 2013 "Feeling Congested?" report by the City of Toronto. Metrolinx has also noted the potential of an extension to the airport, albeit noting that this is an unfunded proposal. In May 2021, Toronto City Council discussed a potential 2.5-kilometre (1.6 mi) extension south from Humber College station to Woodbine GO Station – a proposed GO Transit station on the Kitchener line, which began construction in late June 2025.

At its February 20, 2020, meeting, the Metrolinx board of directors endorsed a prioritization framework for a proposed frequent rapid transit network that included a proposed LRT extension from Humber College station to Pearson International Airport. With a forecast ridership of 2,500 in 2031 and a proposed line length of 7.7 kilometres (4.8 mi) along Highway 27, Disco Road, Carlingview Drive, Dixon Road, Airport Road, Bresler Drive, Campus Road and Viscount Road, the project scored "medium" with a preliminary benefit–cost ratio of less than 0.26. On March 20, 2024, City of Toronto staff presented a report to city council on corridor evaluation results for the prioritization of planned higher-order transit projects, which yielded the following results for extensions to the Finch West LRT:

- Humber College station to Woodbine GO Station (second highest priority)
- Woodbine GO to Pearson International Airport (third highest)

Route 906 Airport-Humber College Express is a TTC bus route that connects Humber College station with the airport at Viscount station.

=== Finch station to Don Mills station ===
In May 2009, Metrolinx proposed that the line be extended from Finch station along Finch Avenue East and Don Mills Road into Don Mills station and Fairview Mall. This would connect the line to the Sheppard East LRT and Line 4 Sheppard, and create a seamless crosstown LRT line in northern Toronto to parallel the Eglinton Crosstown LRT in central Toronto. The TTC said that a planning study would start in 2010. The extension would serve the main campus of Seneca Polytechnic (formerly Seneca College) – Newnham Campus – on Finch Avenue between Don Mills Road and Highway 404.

On March 20, 2024, City of Toronto staff presented a report to city council on corridor evaluation results for the prioritization of planned higher-order transit projects which advised, instead of the above proposal, implementing bus rapid transit on Finch Avenue from:

- Finch station to Victoria Park Avenue (second highest priority)
- Victoria Park Avenue to Morningside Avenue (middle scoring)

== See also ==
- Eglinton East LRT
- Urban rail transit in Canada
