= Finch West station =

Toronto subway station

Finch West
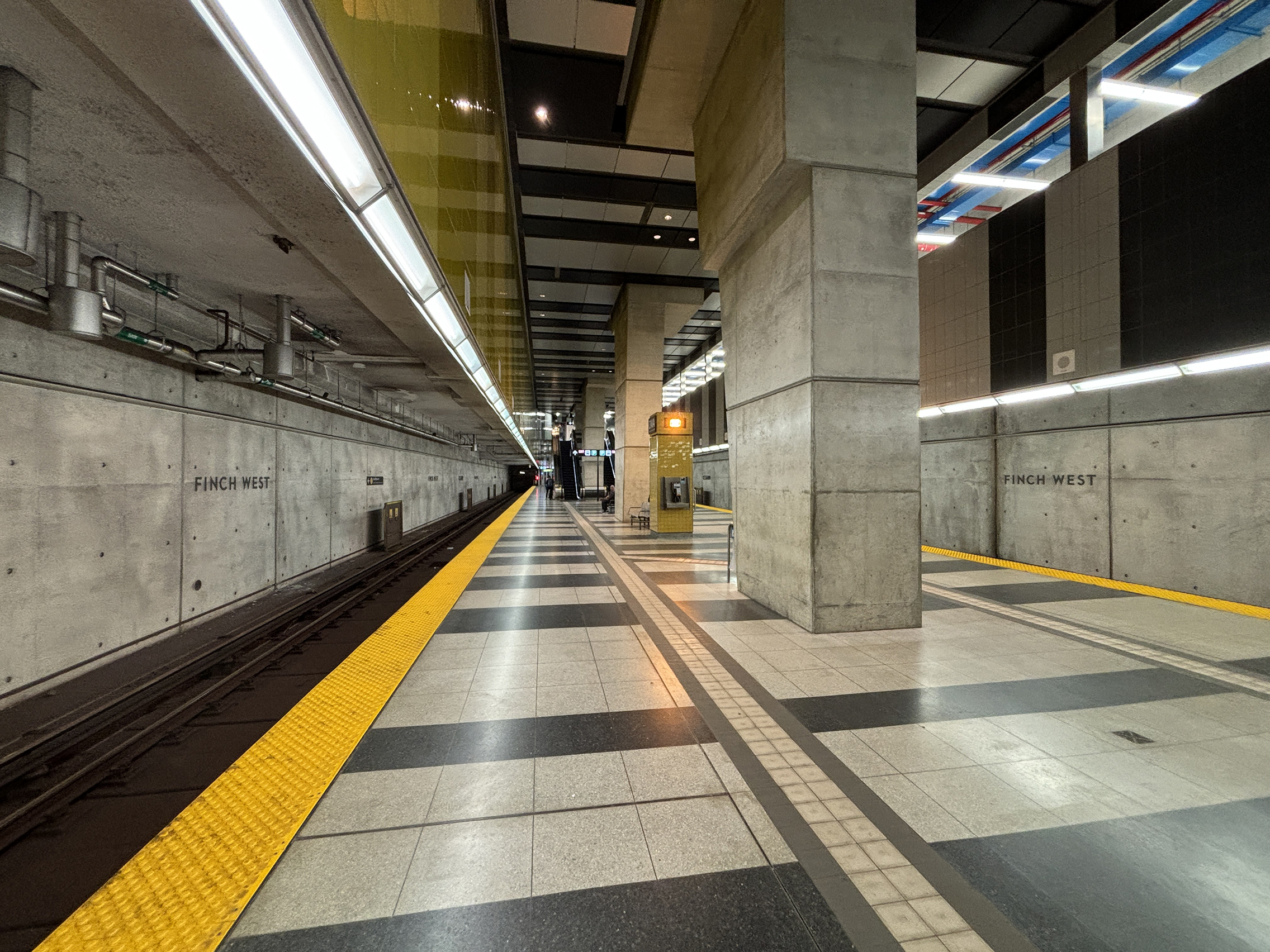
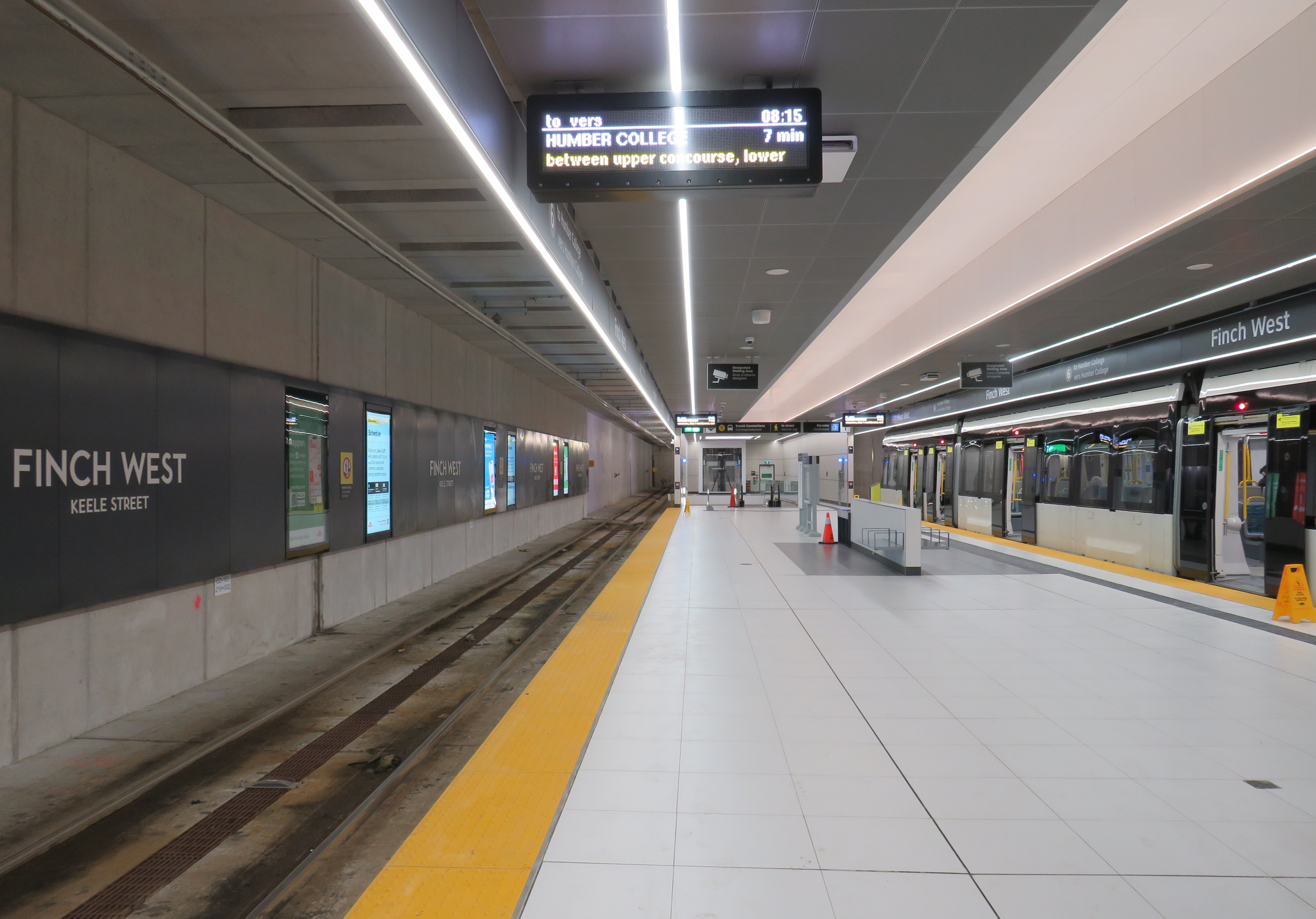
- Line 1 platform Line 6 platform

General information
- Location: 3950 Keele Street; Toronto, Ontario; Canada
- Coordinates: 43°45′53″N 79°29′29″W
- Platforms: Island platforms
- Tracks: 2 (Line 1); 2 (Line 6)
- Bus routes: TTC buses: 36 Finch West; 41 Keele; 101 Downsview Park; 107 Alness–Chesswood; 336 Finch West; 341 Keele; 939B Finch Express; 941 Keele Express

Construction
- Structure type: Underground
- Depth: 15 m (49 ft)
- Parking: 347 spaces
- Cycle facilities: 13 short term
- Accessible: Yes
- Architect: Spadina Group Associates (Will Alsop and IBI Group)
- Architectural style: Postmodern architecture

Other information
- Website: Official station page

History
- Opened: Line 1: December 17, 2017; 8 years ago; Line 6: December 7, 2025; 9 months ago

Passengers
- 2023–2024: 18,345
- Rank: 40 of 70

Services
Preceding station	Toronto Transit Commission	Following station
York University towards Vaughan	Line 1 Yonge–University	Downsview Park towards Finch
Sentinel towards Humber College	Line 6 Finch West	Terminus
Location

Finch West is a Toronto subway interchange station serving Line 1 Yonge–University and Line 6 Finch West in Toronto, Ontario, Canada. It is located at the intersection of Keele Street and Finch Avenue West. It opened as a through station for Line 1 on December 17, 2017, and became the eastern terminus of Line 6 on December 7, 2025.

== Description ==
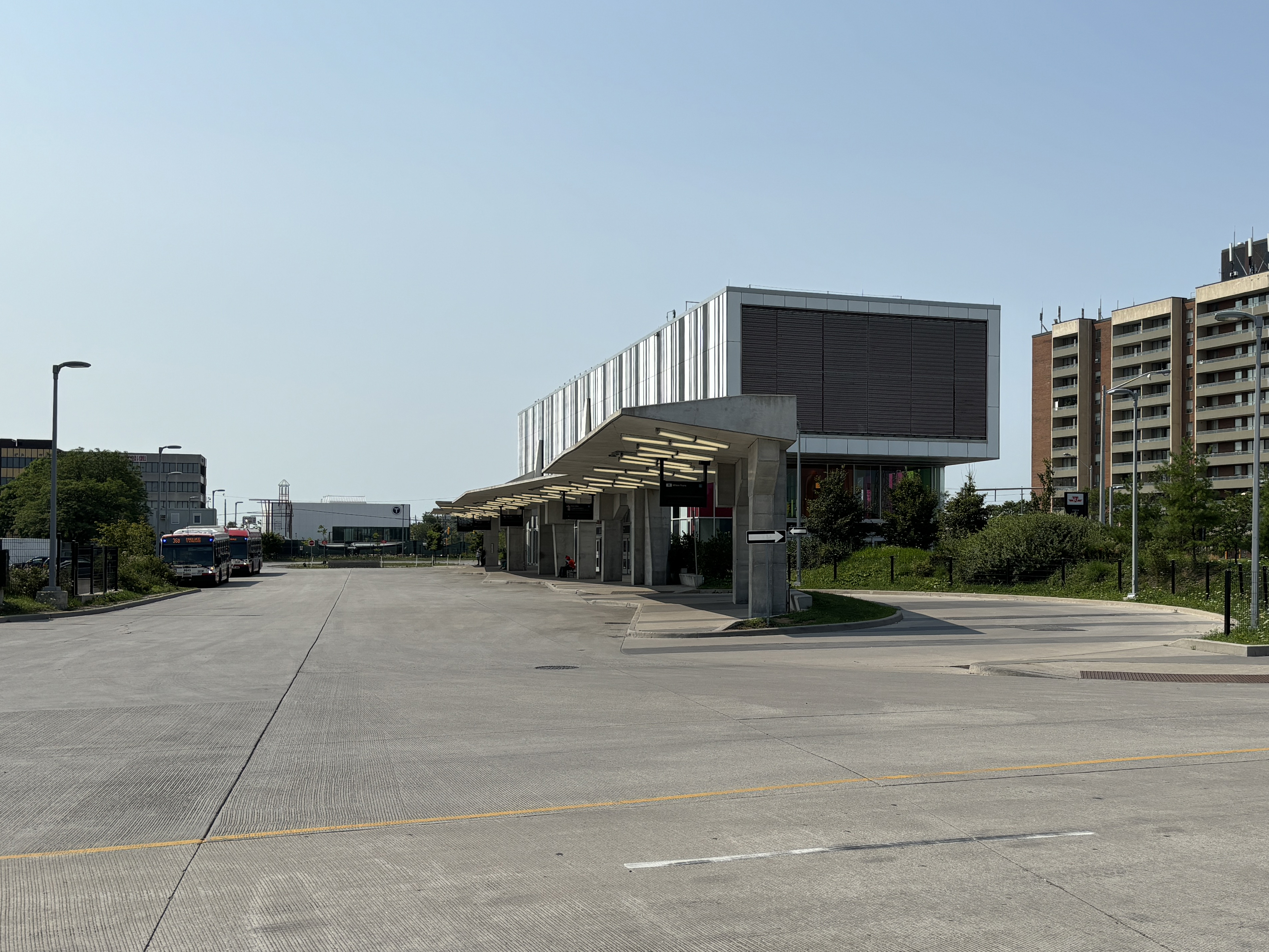
Finch West station main entrance building and bus terminal

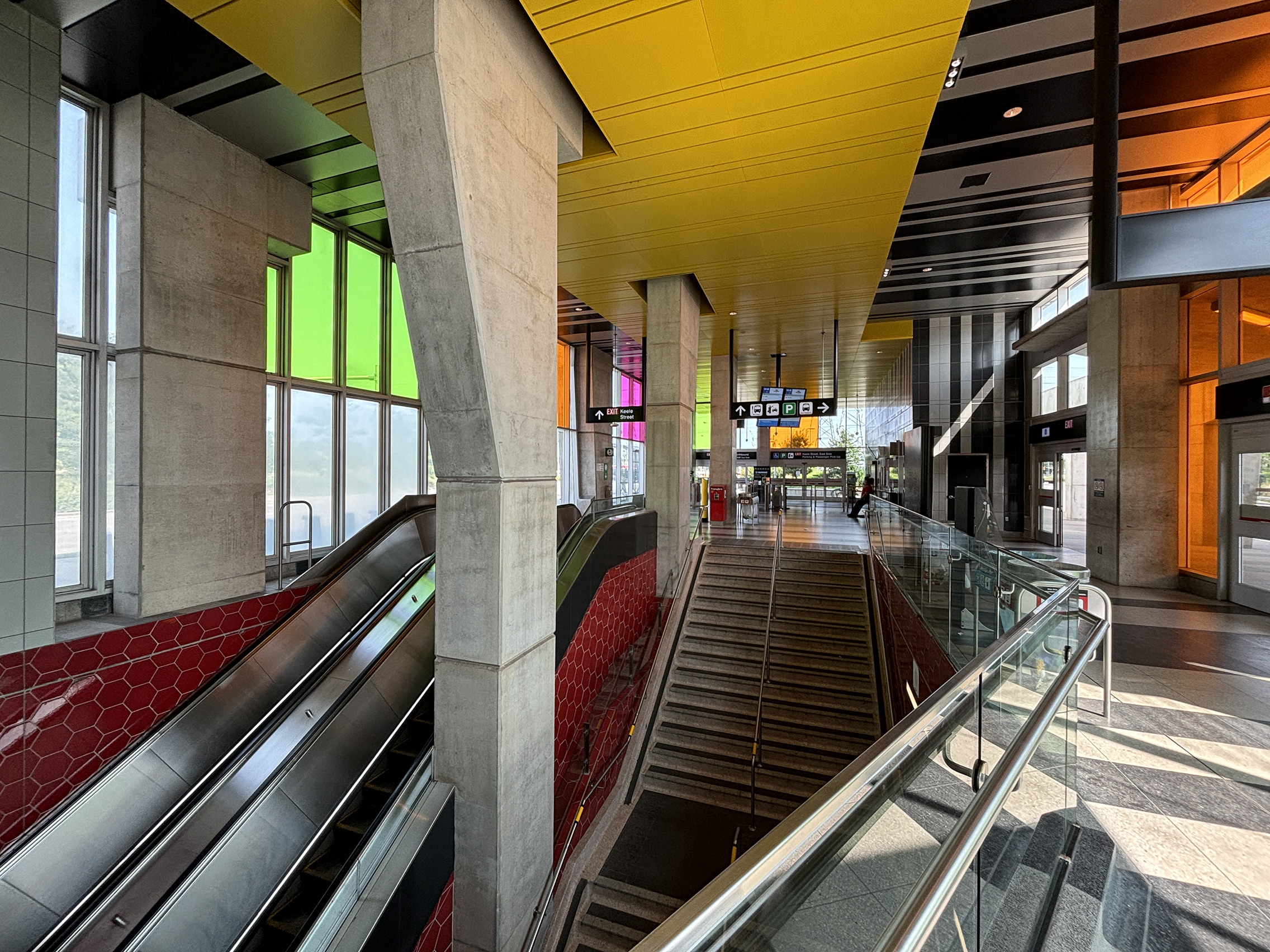
Ground-level concourse

The station is underground and parallel to Keele Street just north of Finch Avenue West. Nearby landmarks include Fountainhead Park. Industrial areas lie to the east, James Cardinal McGuigan Catholic High School to the west and York University is to the northwest, served by York University station on the line.

The main entrance is located on the east side of Keele Street with the secondary entrance on the west side. The exterior of the main entrance features a striped, barcode cladding along with colourful tiling and windows. The concourse level around the faregates also features the barcode motif. An elevated substation facility is in the attic level of the main building and overhangs the main entrance as a canopy. The main entrance is highlighted by a glowing panel attached to the canopy. There is a cool roof over this entrance and a green roof over the elevated substation box. The six-bay bus terminal has a waiting area inside the building. Bicycle parking at the station includes 100 secure plus 13 short-term spaces. North of the station is a parking lot for 347 cars plus a pick-up-and-drop-off facility.

The station was designed by a consortium of architects and engineers, Spadina Group Associates – including All Design (headed by British architect Will Alsop) and IBI Group. Scottish artist Bruce McLean – a frequent collaborator with Will Alsop – worked with the design team to integrate sculptural concrete forms with the supporting columns within the entrance buildings, on double-height platform columns, and under the bus canopy. Landscape design of the station was by Janet Rosenberg & Studio.

The station is the eastern terminus of the namesake Line 6 Finch West, which is subtitled Keele Street under the station name on the Line 6 platform's walls. The platform is located 11 m (36 ft) underground with an east–west orientation under Finch Avenue West, passing over the crossover box structure for Line 1 subway trains. The station has a centre island platform, which is 98 m (322 ft) long to handle light rail vehicle (LRV) trains. West of the platform, Line 6 climbs a grade to street level for its run along the centre of Finch Avenue.

== History ==
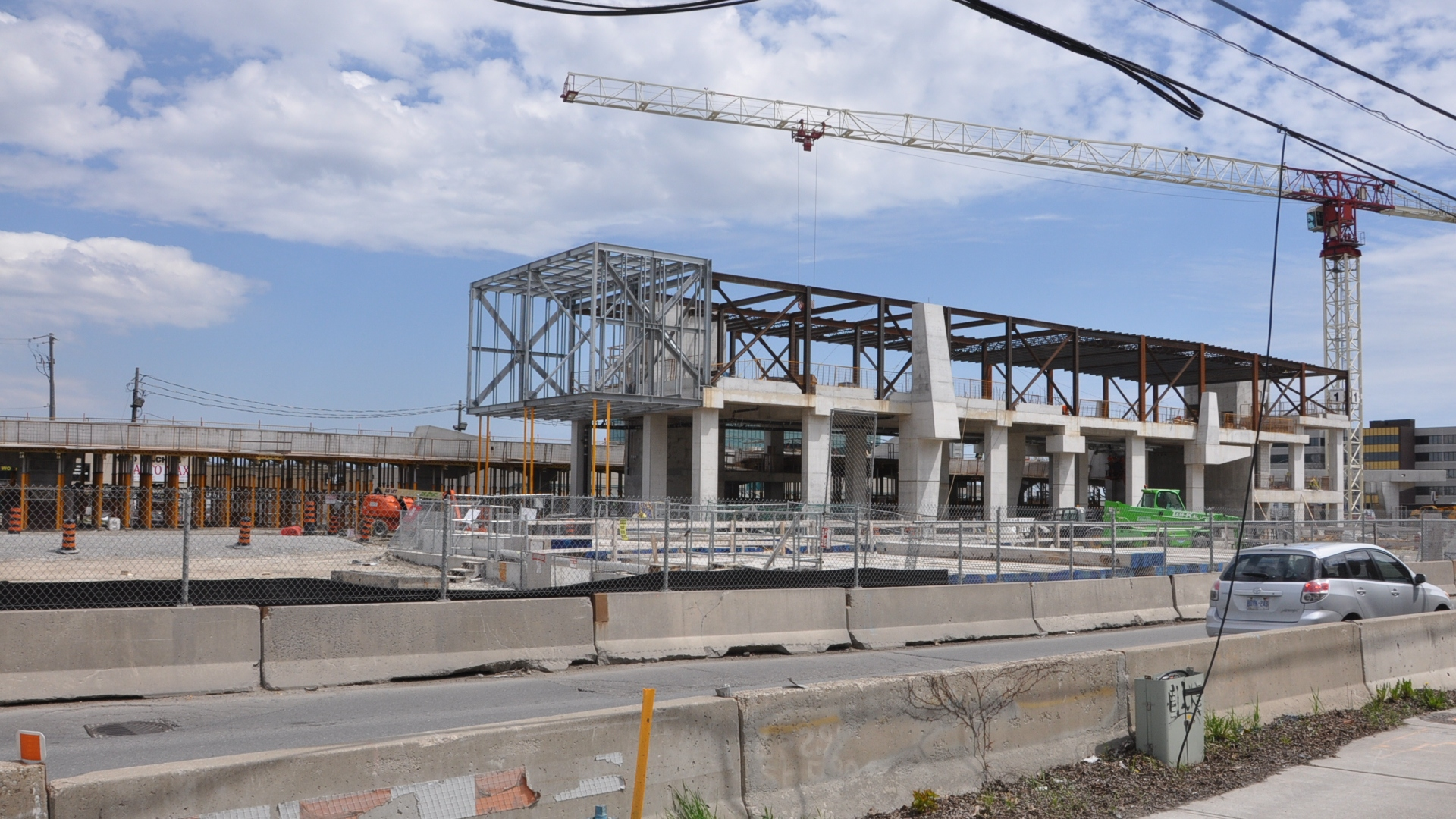
The station under construction in 2016

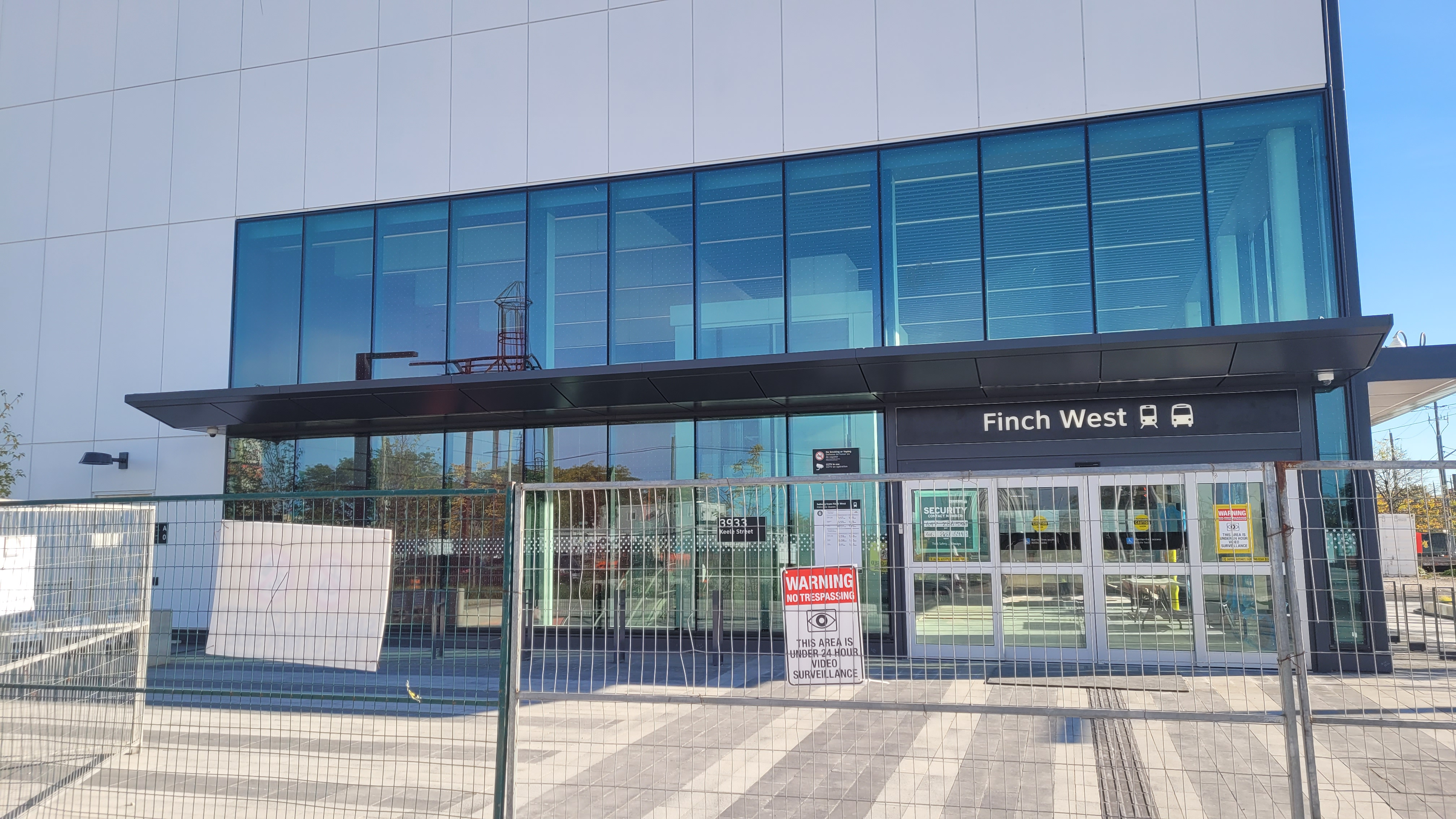
The nearly completed southeast entrance, built as part of the Line 6 project, in October 2024

In March 2006, The Globe and Mail reported that real estate development companies belonging to the family of Ontario Finance Minister Greg Sorbara owned the properties just south of the intersection of Finch Avenue West and Keele Street, according to land registry documents and corporate records. The article said that these companies would benefit from higher real estate values due to the subway extension. Sorbara was the Liberal Member of Provincial Parliament for Vaughan, and was a major advocate for the Toronto–York Spadina subway extension (TYSSE), which includes Finch West station.

On November 27, 2009, the official groundbreaking ceremony was held for the TYSSE, and major tunnelling operations started in June 2011. The project, including Finch West station, was initially expected to be completed by the second quarter of 2015 but was delayed to the fourth quarter of 2016; ultimately, the station opened on December 17, 2017.

In mid-2015, the former Toronto Fire Station 141 on the east side of Keele and south side of the hydro corridor was demolished to make way for the bus platform area. A new fire station replaced this building on the opposite side of Keele Street.

This station, along with the five other TYSSE stations, were the first to be opened without fare collectors, although collector booths were installed as per original station plans. It was also among the first eight stations to discontinue sales of legacy TTC fare media (tokens and tickets). Presto vending machines were available at its opening to sell Presto cards and to load funds or monthly passes onto them. On May 3, 2019, this station became one of the first ten stations to sell Presto tickets via Presto vending machines.

Major construction on Line 6 Finch West was begun by Mosaic Transit Group in 2019. As part of the project, a new two-storey station entrance was built at the southeast corner of the Keele–Finch intersection, with an underground tunnel to link the new line to the existing Line 1 station. Two skylights were built in the median to allow light into the station below. Provision for the Line 6 connection was included as part of the station's design, with knockout panels provided to ease construction. Line 6 opened on December 7, 2025, eight years after the station as a whole.

== Infrastructure in the vicinity ==
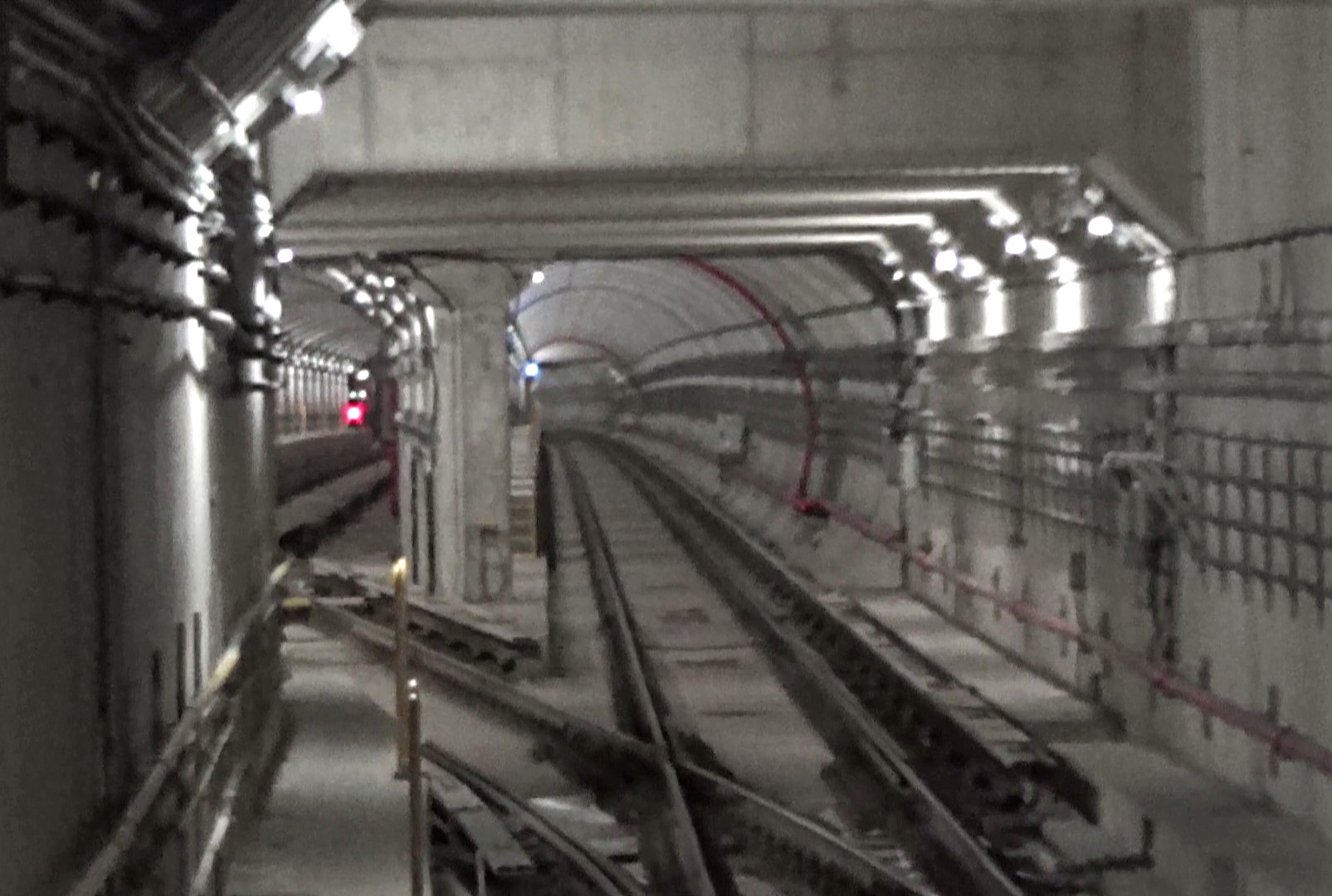
The still-clean tunnels and centre storage track (visible at left) north of the station a few days after the Line 1 extension opened in December 2017. Note the cut-away side of the bored mainline tunnel to accommodate the centre track, which was constructed after the initial boring work.

Line 1 curves off the Keele Street alignment a short distance to the north and south of the station, veering northwest to York University station and swings broadly at a 90° angle southeast to Downsview Park station. To reverse trains, there is both a diamond crossover at the south end of the station and a storage track to the north. The centre track structure at this station was constructed in a unique manner from ones at other stations, which were built using the cut-and-cover method with columns between the tracks. At this station, after the mainline tunnels were bored and the ground excavated for the station structure, the inner sides of the tunnel liners north of the station box were removed, and the centre track tunnel constructed between them, resulting in three fully separate tunnels.

Line 6 has a grade leading to the surface and the median of Finch Avenue west of the platform, with a diamond crossover at the top. There are also tail tracks beyond the east end of the platform for overnight storage for two LRVs.

== Surface connections ==
The 36 Finch West bus route splits here to help maintain reliable service in light of the Finch West LRT construction west of this station. The 36 Finch West and 939B Finch Express enter via Tangiers Road. When the subway is closed, buses do not enter the station and bypass Tangiers Road. Buses serving Keele Street do not enter the station but stop on-street, and a transfer is required for connection. The following routes serve the station:

Finch West station surface transit connections
Bay number	Route	Name	Additional information
1	Wheel-Trans		
2	101A	Downsview Park	Southbound to Stanley Greene Boulevard via Downsview Park station
2	101B	Downsview Park	Southbound to Wilson station via Downsview Park station and Stanley Greene Boulevard (Rush hour service)
3	36	Finch West	Eastbound to Finch station
4	939B	Finch Express	Eastbound to Kennedy station via Finch station and Scarborough Centre station
5	107	Alness–Chesswood	Southbound to Sheppard West station
N/A	41	Keele	Northbound to Pioneer Village station and southbound to Keele station via Keelesdale station (On-street connection)
N/A	941	Keele Express	Southbound to Keele station via Keelesdale station (Rush hour service; on-street connection)
N/A	336	Finch West	Blue Night service; eastbound to Yonge Street and westbound to Woodbine Race Track (Overnight service stops on Finch Avenue West and does not enter the station.)
N/A	341	Keele	Blue Night service; northbound to York University and southbound to Keele station (Overnight service stops on Keele Street and does not enter the station.)
