= James Cardinal McGuigan Catholic High School =

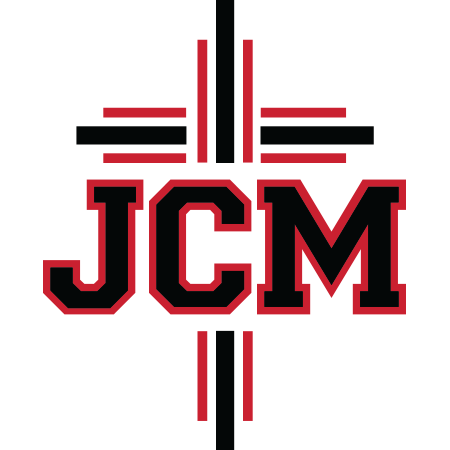

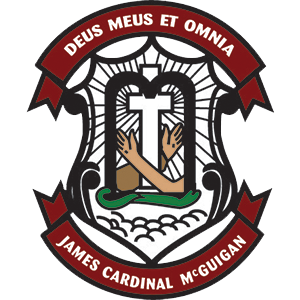

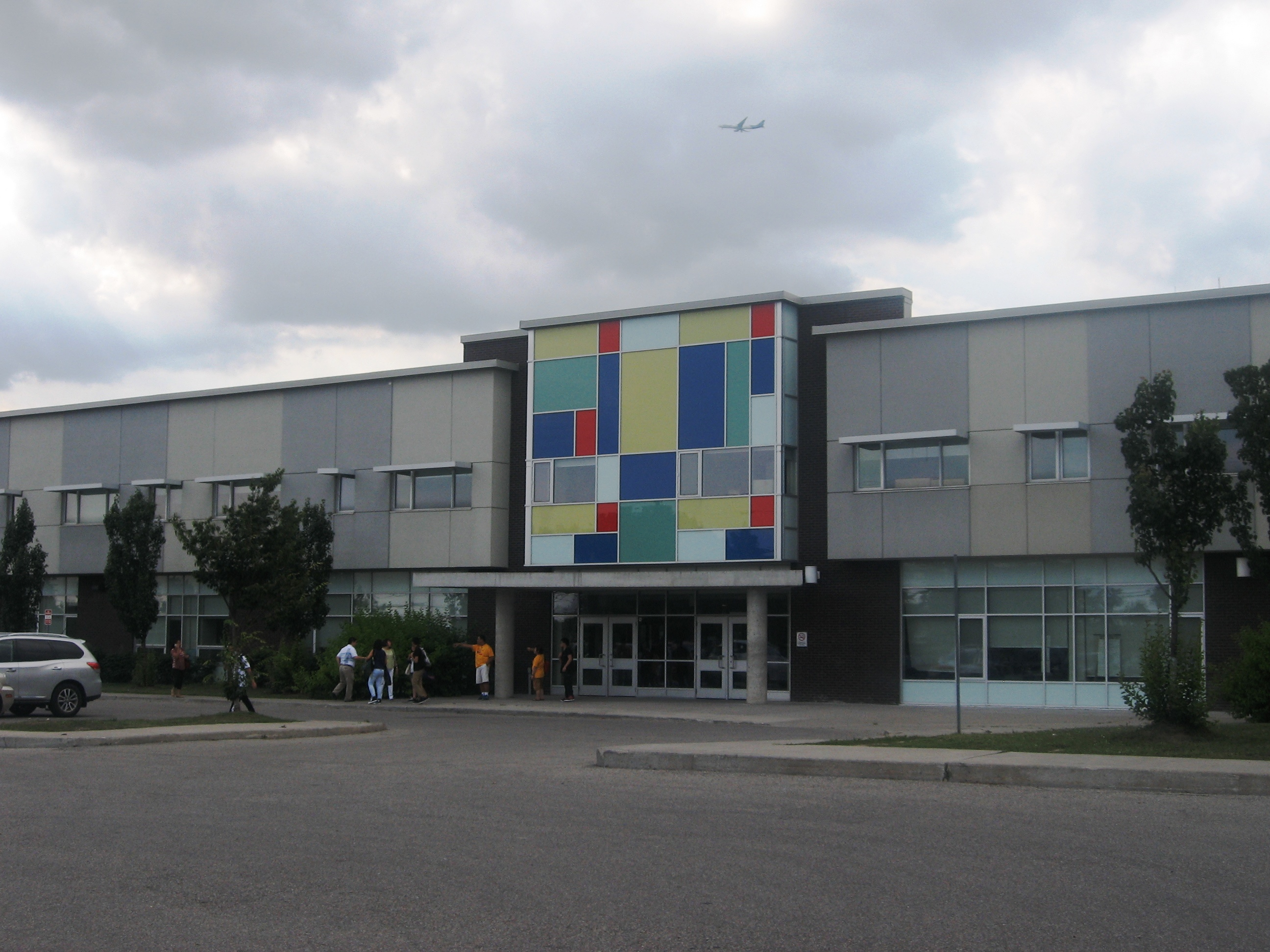

Location
- 1440 Finch Avenue West; Toronto, Ontario, M3J 3G3; Canada; 43.76335°N 79.49362°W

Information
- School type: Catholic High school
- Motto: Deus Meus et Omnia (My God and My All)
- Religious affiliations: Roman Catholic (Franciscan Fathers)
- Founded: 1982
- School board: Toronto Catholic District School Board
- Superintendent: Shawna Campbell; Area 3
- Area trustee: Ida Li Preti; Ward 3
- Principal: Antonio Bisceglia
- Grades: 9-12
- Enrolment: 1068 (2023-24)
- Language: English
- Schedule type: Semestered
- Colours: Burgundy, Black, White
- Team name: McGuigan Wolf Pack
- Phone: 527 / 723096
- Parish: St. Wilfrid
- Specialist High Skills Major: Arts and Culture; Health and Wellness; Information and Communications Technology; Transportation; Sports (awaiting approval from the Board)
- Program Focus: High Performance Athletics Program (HPA); Gifted; Advanced Credit Experience (A.C.E.); S.T.E.A.M. Program (Enriched Science, Technology, Engineering, Arts, Math)
- Website: www.tcdsb.org/o/jamescardinalmcguigan

James Cardinal McGuigan Catholic High School (JCM, James Cardinal McGuigan, or shortly McGuigan) is a secondary school in Toronto, Ontario, Canada. It is named after James Charles McGuigan, a Canadian Cardinal of the Roman Catholic Church and the Archbishop of Toronto from 1934 to 1971. The school was founded by the order of the Franciscan Fathers, who recognized the need for a Catholic School in the Keele-Finch Community. It serves the Downsview neighbourhood of North York.

== History ==
In 1962, St. Basil-the-Great College School opened its doors to serve the northwestern North York community as a private Catholic School. The area's adjacent public high school, C. W. Jefferys Collegiate Institute was opened in 1965 by the North York Board of Education to serve the Keele-Finch neighborhood. Over the next several years, many of the schools were opened under the Metropolitan Separate School Board in the same area: St. Jerome Catholic School in 1963, St. Wilfrid Catholic School in 1966, St. Jane Frances Catholic School in 1964 and St. Martha Catholic School in 1971. However, in 1980, Regina Pacis Catholic Secondary School, located near Finch and Highway 400, opened its doors.

James Cardinal McGuigan High School was opened in September 1982 by the Franciscans and the Metropolitan Separate School Board with the building constructed in 1984. The school expanded in 1988, when the MSSB acquired six acres west of the school from the North York Board of Education in exchange of the long-term lease of Lewis S. Beattie Secondary School to house students from École Charbonnel.

Since the closure of Regina Pacis in 2002, McGuigan's enrolment grew and its facilities were expanded with the new western wing completed by 2008.

== Background ==
Academics

James Cardinal McGuigan C.S.S. offers both an Applied (College) and Academic (University) bound courses, to which students can choose from. It also has an "Essentials" option as an alternative. The School offers a "High School Transition Program", where Grade 8 students follow and study based on a secondary school timetable for the month of July. This enables the students to get accustomed with secondary school rules, be able to engage with other students, and prepare them for the upcoming school year. This program is mainly run by leadership and council students who are closely selected based on academic and inter-personal skills. Upon beginning the first year, Grade 9 students go at an overnight three day excursion at the YMCA Camp Wanakita, to experience outdoor activities and encourage student interactions.

S.H.S.M. (Specialist High Skills Major)

The school offers a Transportation Technology course, where students take part in practical work and study theories in relation to automotive systems. Starting at Grade 11, students can select the Transportation Tech. S.H.S.M. program, which extends into Grade 12. The program has a co-op component where students are sent to auto companies, or car dealerships. The second and third S.H.S.M. programs that are offered include the Arts and Culture and Health and Wellness Programs. Upon completion, S.H.S.M. students will earn a red seal certification in their O.S.S.D. and become qualified for the workplace. Furthermore, the acquired practical experience and gained knowledge will give S.H.S.M. students an advantage in Post-Secondary education.

S.T.E.A.M. (Enriched Science, Technology, Engineering, Arts, and Math)

Recently, a specialty program called S.T.E.A.M. has been introduced in the school system and is similar to the MST (Enriched Math, Science, Technology) program offered by other schools. The specialty program has two components, the first is the S.T.E.A.M. S.H.S.M. program, which focuses on the existing S.H.S.M. courses already offered, but introducing it to first and second year students. Once a specialty course is selected, the students are offered dual-credit opportunities, introduction to OYAP programs, and guaranteed co-op placements. The second component of the S.T.E.A.M. program is the Academic Enriched route, in which students take mandatory honours math and science courses, and an elective in Computer Engineering, Robotics, and Transportation or Hospitality. In either routes, students must take an entry test and go through an interview process to be considered. Successful candidates are granted a placement in the program and S.T.E.A.M. students must maintain a 75% overall average to stay in the program.

A.C.E. (Advanced Credit Experience)

James Cardinal McGuigan C.S.S. is one of several schools in the city to have a partnership with nearby York University, making it the only school in the Catholic board to offer the A.C.E (Advanced Credit Experience) Program. Select Grade 12 students are able to take a post-secondary course from the choices offered without any enrolment fees. Completion of a post-secondary course will guarantee a course credit equivalent towards the student's university transcript, a consideration when applying to York University, a bursary from $1000-$5000, and a summer job placement. Furthermore, because of the partnership, the university is able to offer various scholarships to graduating students, one of them being the Honderich Bursary of $32,000 to either one or two students, and a Chancellor Bennett Entrance Award of $20,000. The school also offers a multitude of scholarship and bursary awards from different institutions to select students who meet the extensive and competitive qualifications.

Curriculum

James Cardinal McGuigan C.S.S. operates on a semester based schedule, with a maximum of 8 courses per school year, 4 per semester. Since the school is a Roman Catholic school, it follows a mandatory religious curriculum, where all students take compulsory Religion classes. In addition, there is a mandatory Religion Retreat school trip students go to every year as it counts as a percentage towards their average. The Grade 9 religion course is an open course focusing on the life of Jesus Christ. The Grade 10 religion course focuses more in depth of the Bible, looking into the Old Testament. The Grade 11 religion course revolves around World Religions. Students study eastern religions such as Buddhism, Hinduism, and Sikhism, and Western Religions such as Christianity, Islam, and Judaism. The Grade 12 religion course offers a university/College option which focuses on the philosophical nature of moral and ethics, combing it with the Roman Catholic perspective of life.

- List of high schools in Ontario

== Campus ==
The McGuigan campus is a combination of the recently constructed West Wing building and the original East Wing building. The difference between the two can be seen by the contrasting design and architecture.

Due to the growing student population and the need for better facilities, the new extension was built to modernize and revitalize the school. When the extension was finished, the new extension was able to add eight additional classrooms, additional multi-purpose rooms, a larger and more spacious administrative office, and a large, high ceiling cafeteria which can be converted to an equipped auditorium for events, and an outdoor yard for activities. Recently, the gym underwent an extensive renovation which added a new digital score board, addition of a fitness room, and among other upgrades.

In 2023, the school started phase one of its athletics expansion with the addition of a state of the art outdoor basketball court, complete with NBA size court, 6 glass backboards, stands, fence, digital scoreboard and outdoor stadium style lighting.

The original building houses most of the school's 30+ classrooms, and the automotive shop, which is open to the school community. It also houses the St. Francis and St. Clare of Assisi Chapel, which retains numerous historical stained glasses.

== Athletics ==
James Cardinal McGuigan offers a multitude of Male and Female sport teams to join from, in addition, there are sports clubs that are offered for after-school recreational purposes.

Sports

- Tackle Football (Varsity)
- Flag Football (Junior and Senior)
- Prep Basketball (Junior and Senior)
- Basketball (Junior and Senior)
- Soccer (Junior and Senior)
- Volleyball (Junior and Senior)
- Ultimate Frisbee (Varsity)
- Badminton (Junior and Senior)
- Cheerleading (Junior and Senior)
- Cross Country (Novice, Junior and Senior)
- Track and Field (Novice, Junior and Senior)

== See also ==
- Education in Ontario
- List of secondary schools in Ontario
