= Old Mill, Toronto =

Riverside neighbourhood of Toronto, Ontario, Canada

Coordinates: 43.6521°N 79.4893°W

Old Mill
- Neighbourhood
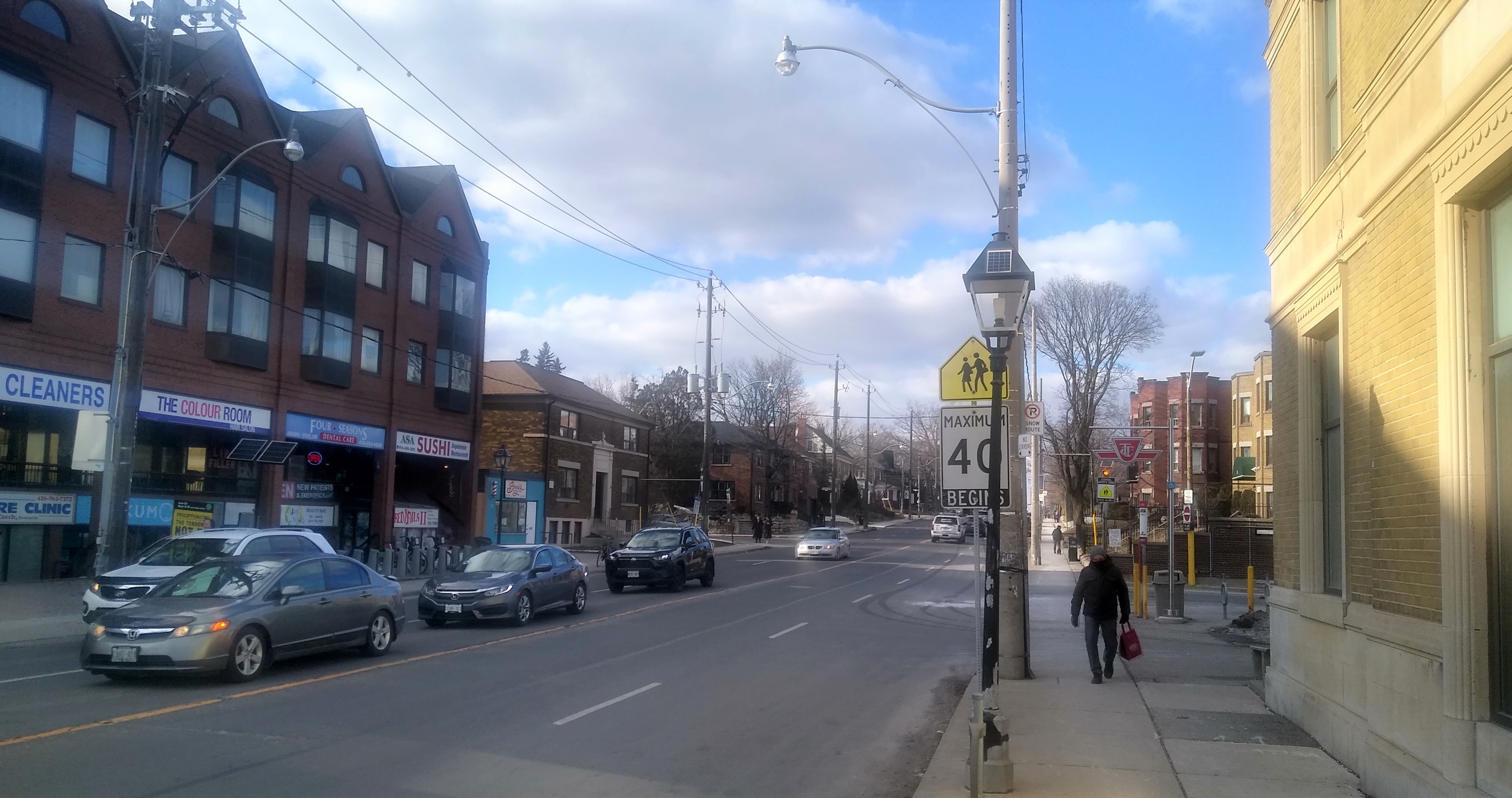
- Looking north on Jane Street, with the neighbourhood located west of the roadway

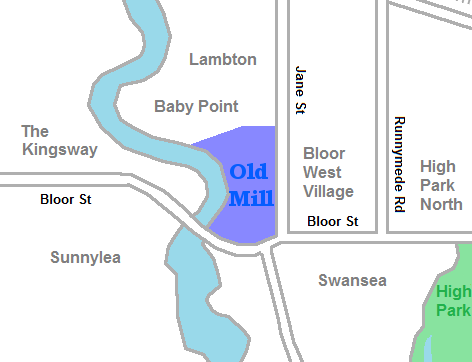
- Country: Canada
- Province: Ontario
- City: Toronto
- Established: 1850 (York Township)
- Changed municipality: 1998 Toronto from York

Government
  - MP: Karim Bardeesy (Parkdale—High Park)
  - MPP: Bhutila Karpoche (Parkdale—High Park)
  - Councillor: Gord Perks (Ward 4 Parkdale—High Park)

Old Mill is a neighbourhood of Toronto, Ontario, Canada on the banks of the Humber River. It is located north and west of the intersection of Bloor Street and Jane Street. The area takes its name from the old grist mill ruins on the west bank of the river, now converted into a hotel (also named "Old Mill"). The City of Toronto includes this neighbourhood in the official "Lambton Baby Point" neighbourhood which includes the Baby Point enclave and former Lambton village areas to the north.

== Character ==
The neighbourhood's houses are primarily single-family detached homes, built before and after the Second World War. The Old Mill Inn & Spa is located in the neighbourhood on the west side of the Humber River in Etobicoke. Most of the area is on a slope leading down from Jane and Bloor Streets, into the Humber valley. One street, Halford Avenue, is paved with brick, cobblestones or paving stones. Several of the more steep streets can become impassable in the wintertime.

Along Bloor Street, two condominium developments replaced an auto dealer. Some businesses exist on the north side of Bloor Street and the west side of Jane around the intersection. There is a film theatre, the Humber Cinema multiplex at the intersection of Bloor and Jane. The Humber Cinema closed on May 30, 2019.

== History ==
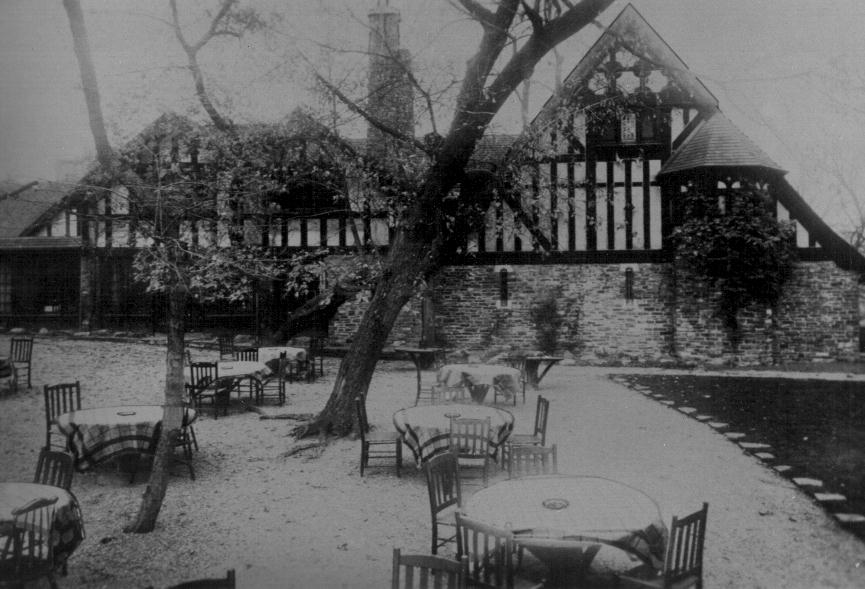
View of Old Mill, c. 1900s. The area bears the name of the Old Mill, which is situated west of the neighbourhood.

Historically, it was a hunting and fishing area for First Nations. A native village existed just to the north at Baby Point before European colonisation. By 1720, the French had established a small fortified settlement called Magasin Royal, near the present site of the Old Mill, for trading with native bands. By 1800, the first English settlement in the area was around the Kings Mill, used to cut lumber for the first homes in York, Upper Canada, now known as Toronto. A series of mills were constructed, until the last one was abandoned in 1881.

After 1900, the area was laid out for residential uses. The Old Mill Tea Room was used as a community centre as the area was developed. The neighbourhood was part of York Township. The extreme south edge of the land was part of Swansea, and lands along Jane Street were a part of Toronto. York became the Borough of York, then the City of York and was finally merged into the amalgamated City of Toronto in 1998.

== Transportation ==
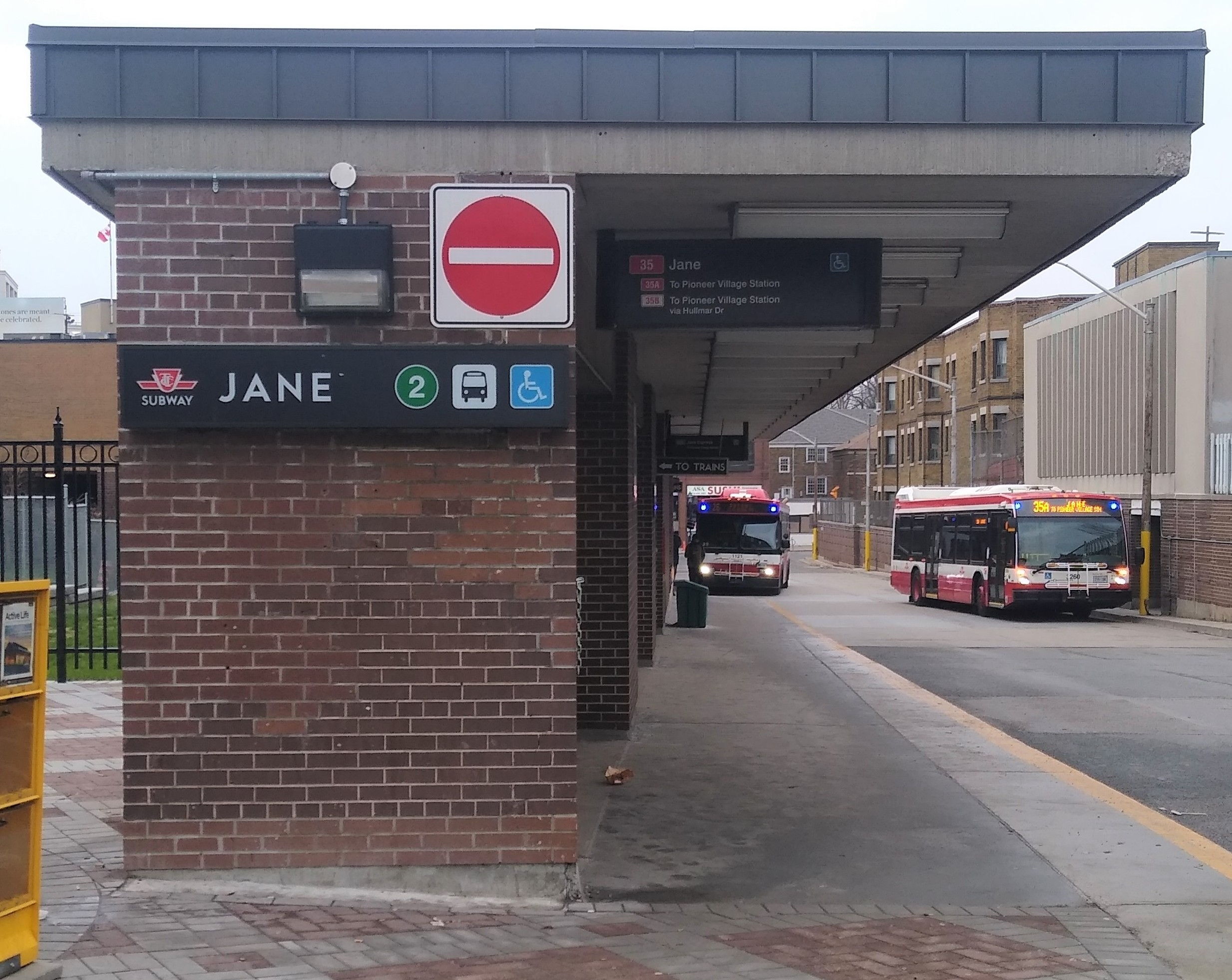
Jane station is a subway station located southeast of the neighbourhood.

Old Mill Drive connects to Bloor Street West at its southern end. Across the Humber River to the west is the neighbourhood's namesake subway station, with a unique partially elevated design above the Humber River. The 66 Prince Edward bus route runs from this station south to Humber Bay Park and Humber Loop, where connections are available to the 501 Queen streetcar route.

Several of the neighbourhood streets connect to Jane Street, which has regular bus service operated by the TTC. Jane subway station is located at its southern end where it intersects Bloor Street. Both Jane and Old Mill stations are located on Line 2 of the subway network and have frequent service towards Downtown Toronto.
