= Humber Cinemas =

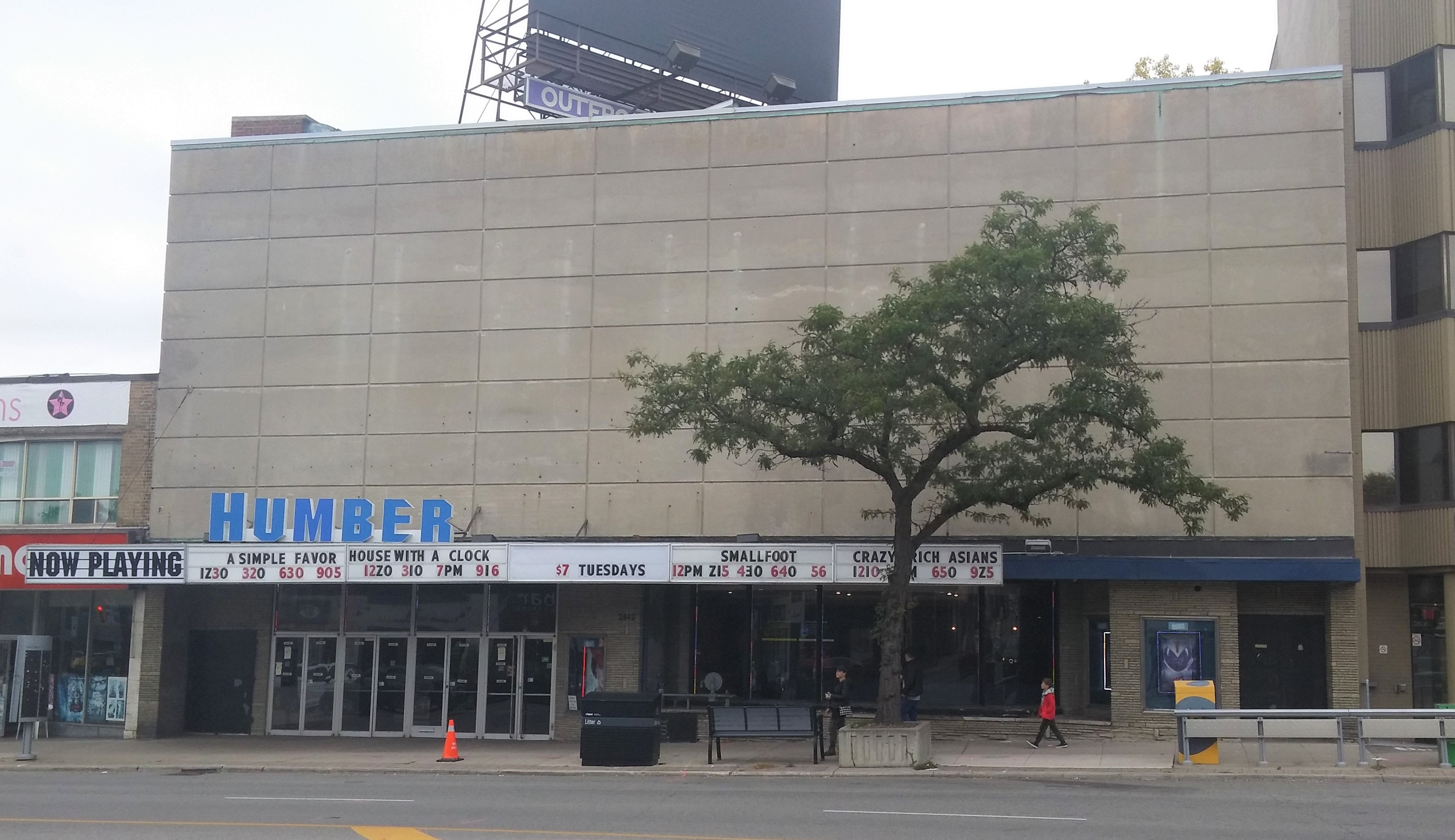
- The theatre in 2018.

General information
- Type: Cinema
- Location: 2442 Bloor Street West, Toronto, Ontario, Canada
- Opened: January 27, 1948
- Closed: May 30, 2019; 7 years ago
- Demolished: Early 2020s

Design and construction
- Architect: Jay Isadore

Other information
- Public transit: Jane station

Humber Cinemas, originally the Odeon Humber Theatre, was a movie theatre in Toronto, Ontario, Canada. The theatre was operated by the Odeon and Loews Cineplex chains until 2003. The theatre re-opened as an independent theatre in 2011 and operated until 2019 when it closed permanently. The theatre was located on Bloor Street just west of Jane Street.

The Humber opened on January 27, 1948. It was designed by architect Jay Isadore, originally seating 1200 patrons in one large auditorium, which was split into upper and lower auditoriums in the 1970s. It was operated for decades by the Odeon cinema chain, was closed in 2003, abandoned, and re-opened by new owners in 2011, after a $350,000 renovation. According to Doug Taylor, author of Toronto's Local Theatres of Yesteryear, operator Rui Pereira preserved the upper auditorium, but split the lower auditorium into four smaller auditoria.

The reopening was a success, so local residents were concerned when Plazacorp, the sites owner, planned to tear down the building, to build high-rise condominiums. Local city councillor Sarah Doucette asked Plazacorp to incorporate a replacement cinema into its designs. The theatre permanently closed on May 30, 2019.
