= Jane Street (Toronto) =

Roadway in Ontario, Canada

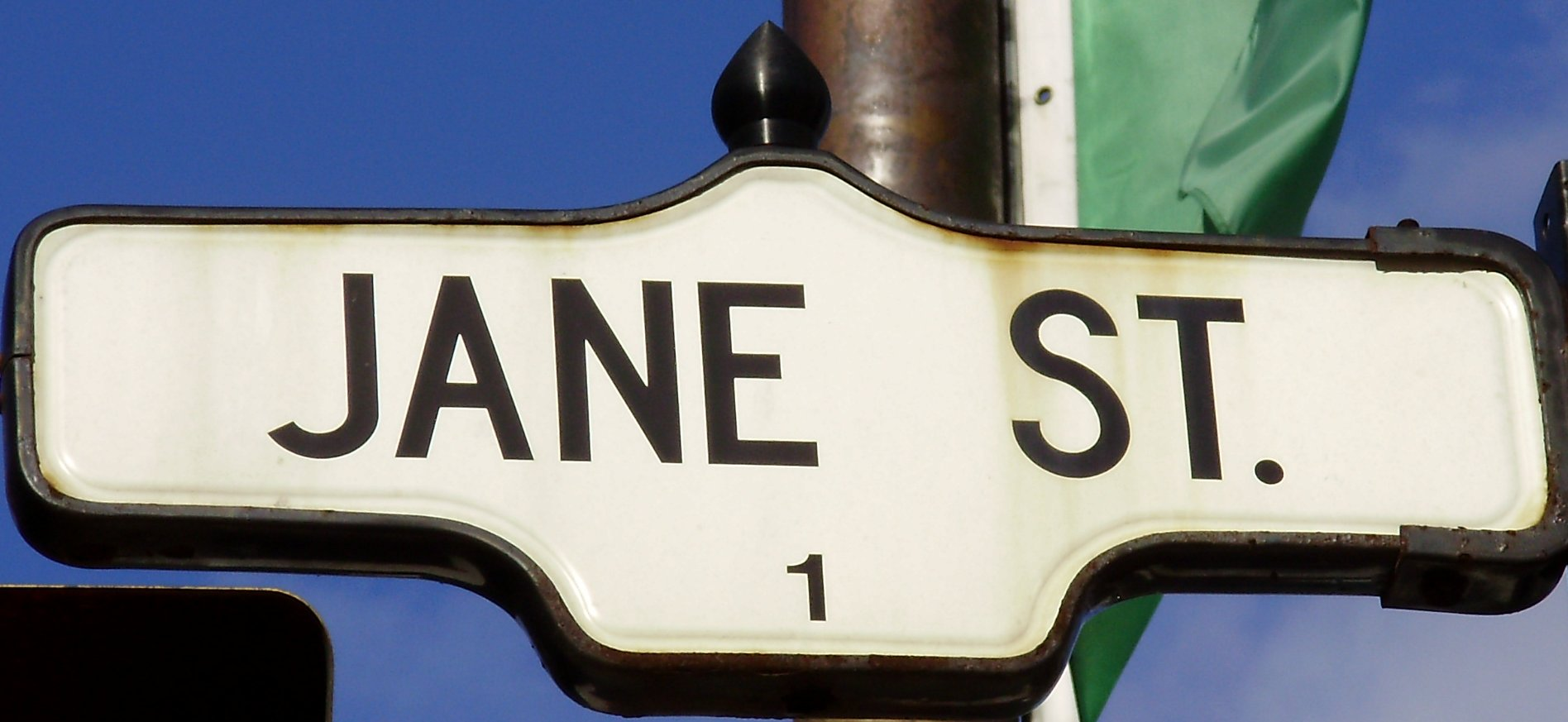
- York Regional Road 55
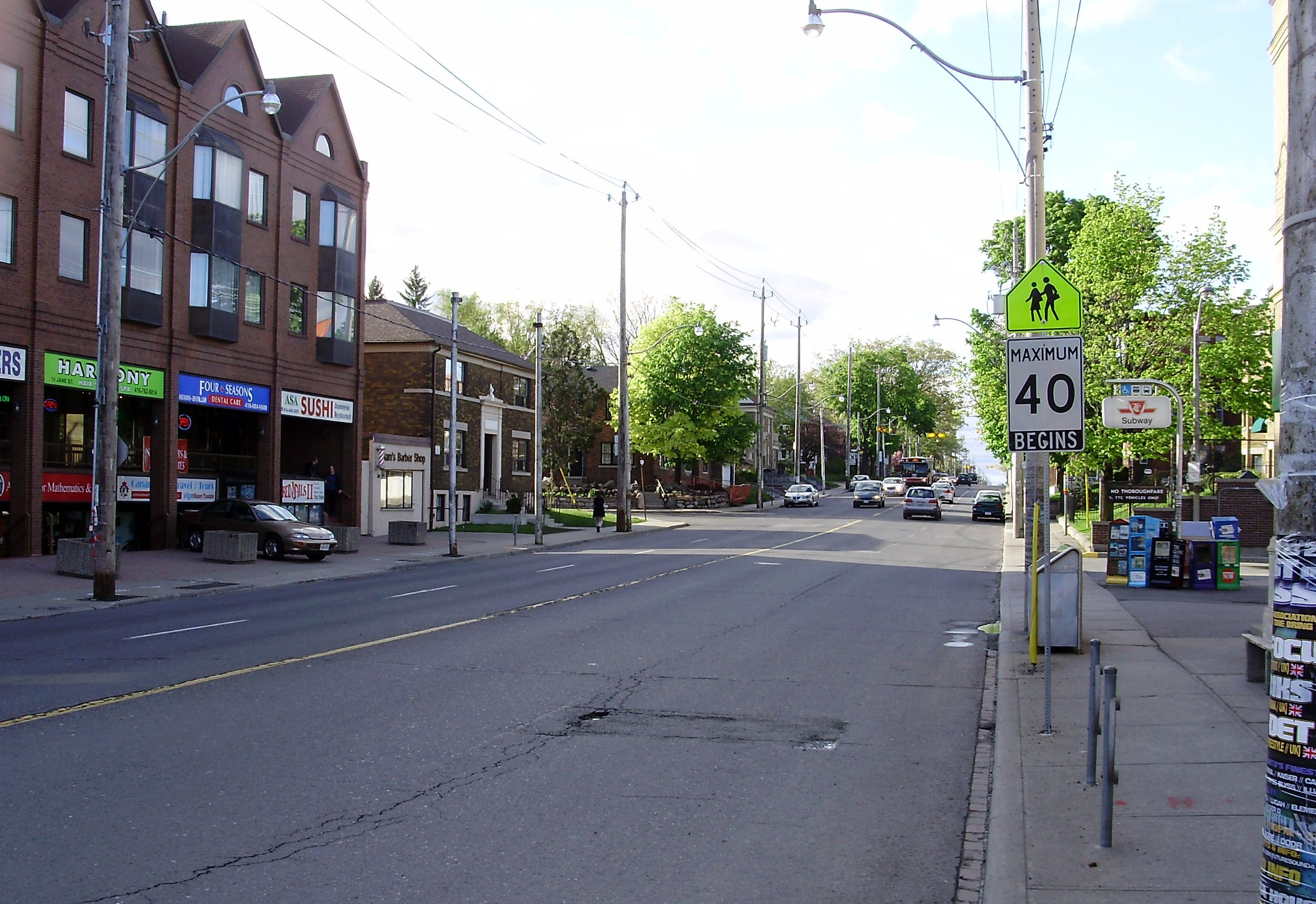
- Jane Street looking north from Bloor Street

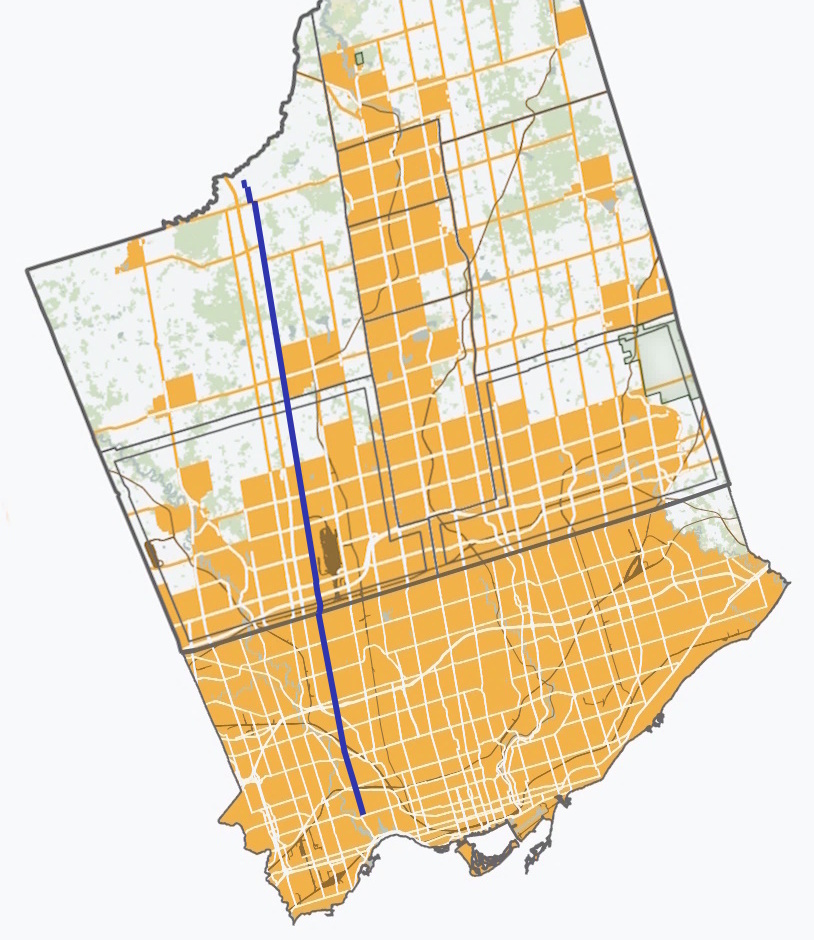
- Route of Jane Street through Toronto and York Region (blue line)
- Maintained by: City of Toronto; York Region; Township of King
- Location: Toronto; Vaughan; King
- South end: Bloor Street
- Major junctions: St. Clair Avenue; Eglinton Avenue; Lawrence Avenue; Highway 400; Wilson Avenue; Sheppard Avenue; Finch Avenue; Steeles Avenue; Highway 407; Highway 7; Langstaff Road; Rutherford Road; Major Mackenzie Drive; Teston Road; Kirby Road; King-Vaughan Road; King Road; Lloydtown-Aurora Road; Davis Drive
- North end: Edward Avenue

Other
Nearby arterial roads in Toronto
← Royal York Road; Weston Road; Highway 400	Keele Street; Weston Road; Black Creek Drive →

Jane Street is a major north–south thoroughfare in Toronto, Ontario, Canada. The 5th concession west of Yonge Street, the road begins at Bloor Street and continues north into York Region, before ending in the Holland Marsh in King Township. Jane Street is one of the most heavy trafficked roads in the Greater Toronto Area, with the Toronto Transit Commission (TTC) bus routes serving the street being among the system's busiest. The street bypasses several neighbourhoods and landmarks, including Bloor West Village, Jane and Finch, Vaughan Mills, and Canada's Wonderland.

The most infamous place on Jane Street would be the Jane and Finch area, known for its high crime rate and being one of the poorest neighbourhoods in Toronto. The title character of the Barenaked Ladies song "Jane" is Jane St. Clair, and is named after the intersection of Jane and St. Clair Avenue. Steven Page recalls that co-writer Stephen Duffy saw the intersection on a map and remarked that it sounded like the most beautiful intersection in the world; "I didn't have the heart to tell him it wasn't".

== Route description ==
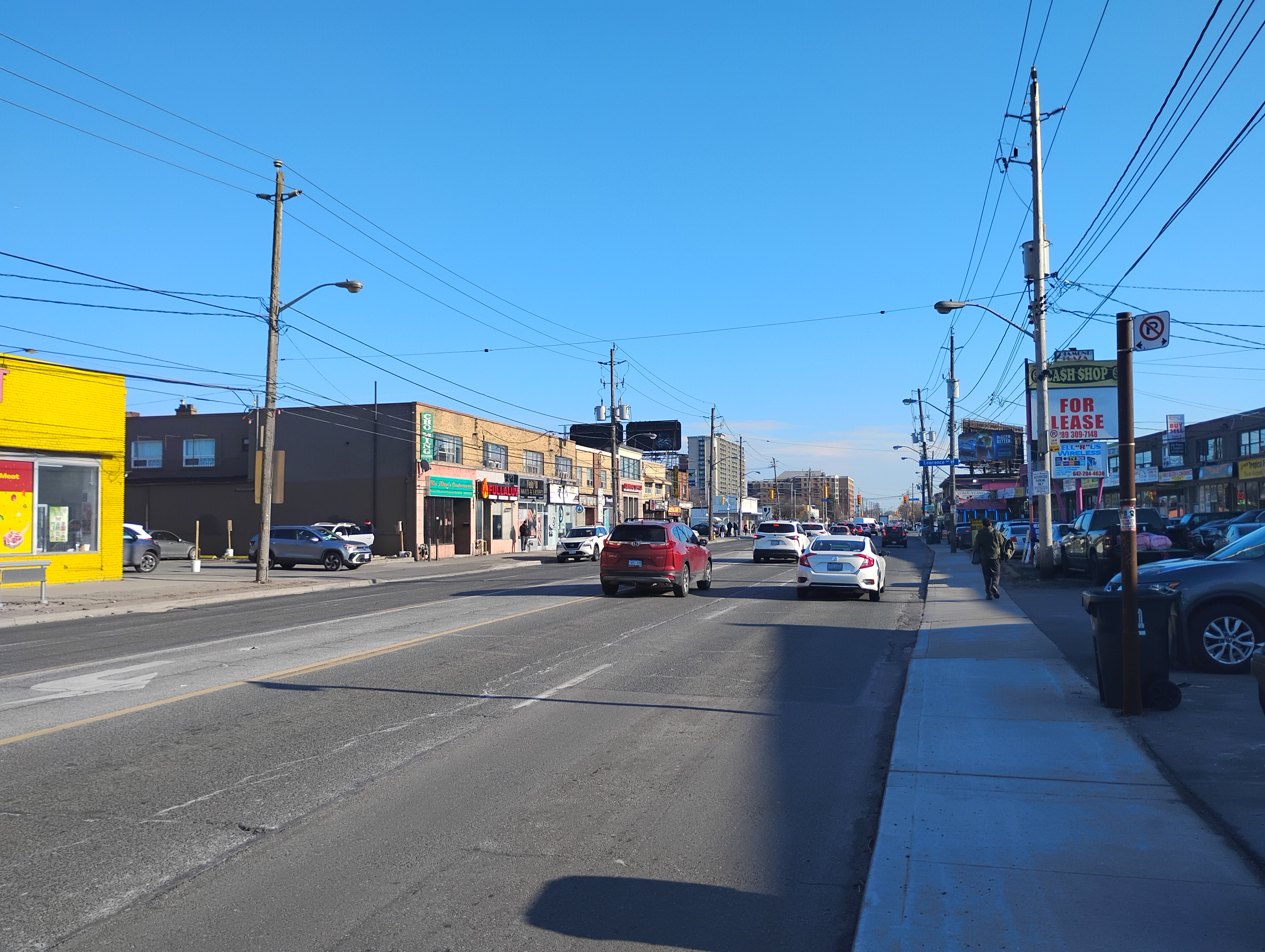
Jane Street near Lawrence Avenue

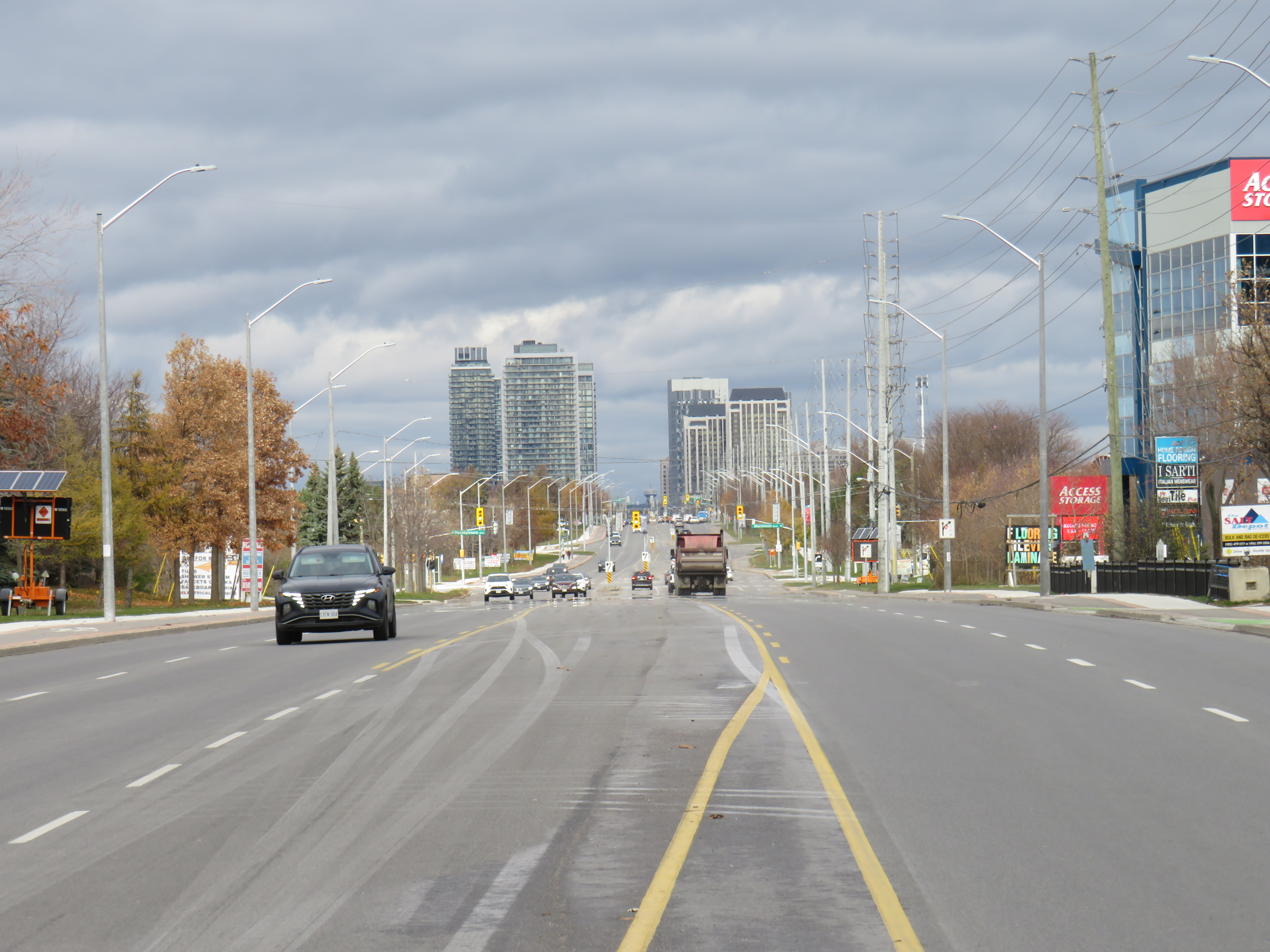
Jane Street north of Highway 7 in Vaughan

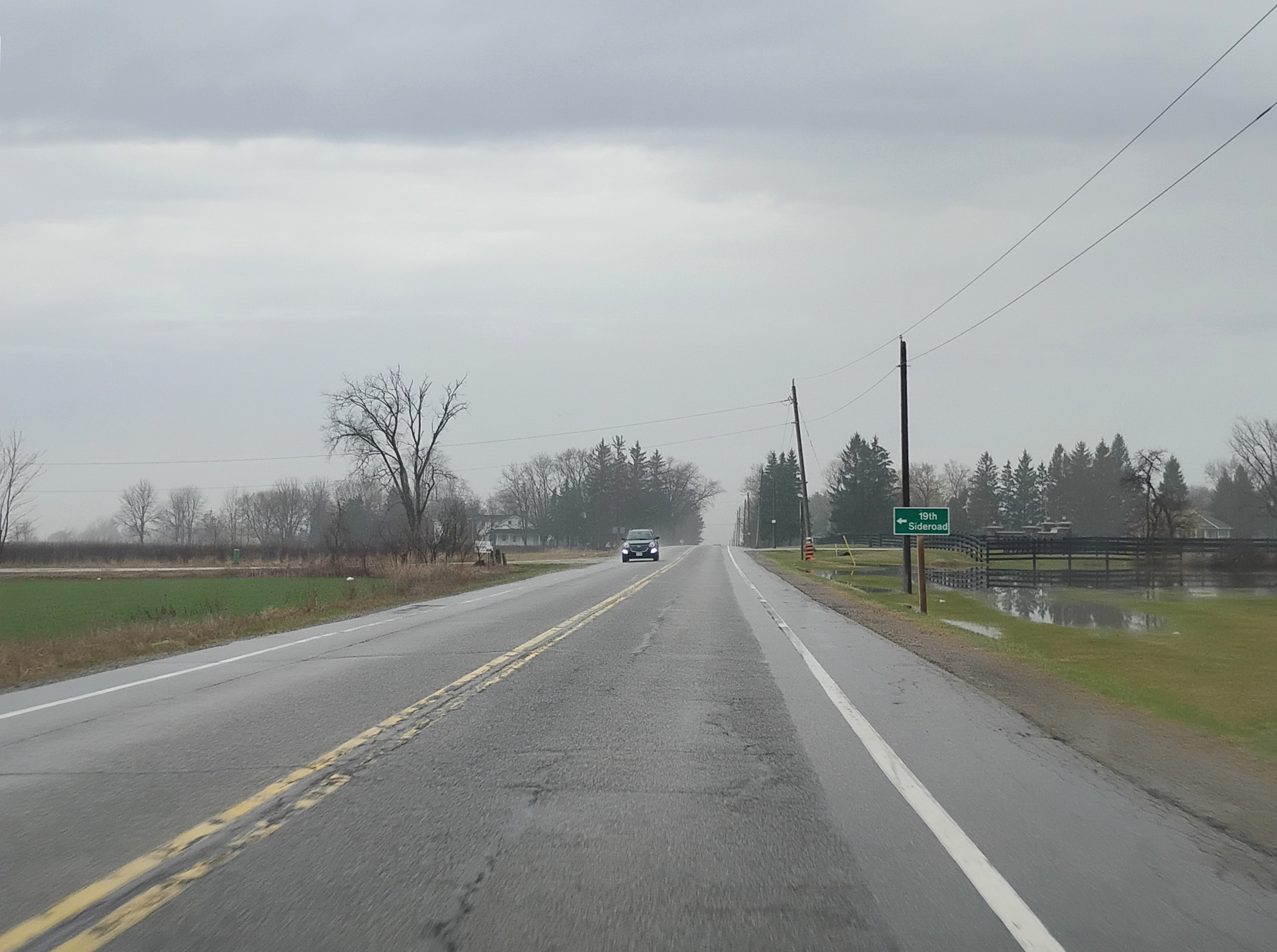
Rural Jane Street in King Township

Jane Street is an urban four-lane road until reaching Teston Road in the suburban City of Vaughan (a distance of nearly 25 kilometres or 16 miles), and has a median lane for most of that stretch north of Eglinton Avenue.

The street begins at Bloor Street West, with Jane station on Line 2 Bloor-Danforth being situated immediately north of Bloor St. West. In Toronto, it primarily passes through residential areas, including the infamous intersection and neighbourhood of Jane and Finch, known for having a high crime rate.

Passing Steeles and entering the City of Vaughan in York Region, Jane Street is designated as York Regional Road 55. The Line 1 Yonge–University subway line's western branch parallels Jane for two kilometres until that line reaches its terminus at Highway 7. The street becomes a mixed commercial and highrise residential road after passing Highway 407 and entering Vaughan Metropolitan Centre, Vaughan's planned downtown core, then runs alongside Vaughan Mills and Canada's Wonderland.

At Teston Road, Jane Street finally becomes rural and narrows down to two lanes until reaching Davis Drive (formerly Highway 9). After jogging to the west it resumes through the Holland Marsh, and jogs west a second time at Woodchoppers Lane, before reaching its northern terminus at Edward Avenue, a minor rural road.

== History ==
The street was named after Jane Barr by her husband, James. They immigrated from Glasgow in 1907, and a few years later James became a real estate developer in the region north of Toronto (then called York). Numerous streets in James' developments were named after his children, but the most important was named after his wife Jane.

Originally, Jane Street continued south to Lake Ontario with a sinuous course, but that section was redesignated as South Kingsway after Bloor Street was linked to its western section in Etobicoke across the Humber River (where it was originally broken) by being realigned into a reverse curve which incorporated a short length of the southern segment of Jane, severing it from the section north of Bloor. South Kingsway itself was originally intended to be a southern extension of The Kingsway which lies west of the Humber River on the north side of Bloor, but the new bridge and right-of-way was instead used for the Bloor Street connection to the section west of the river.

Until the early 1970s Jane Street had a break through the valley of the Humber River, near what is today Eglinton Avenue, which itself ended at the river on the east side. The two sections of Jane were joined by bridging the river in a combined project which included extending Eglinton across the valley by linking up with the Richview Side Road on its west side in Etobicoke.

In 2007, there was a proposal for a Jane LRT to be developed, which would run in the centre median of Jane Street. However, the proposal was canceled in 2010, after Rob Ford had become Mayor of Toronto.

== Public Transit ==
There are four subway stations and one light rail stop situated either directly on (or close to) Jane Street, from north to south:

on Line 1:

- Vaughan Metropolitan Centre
- Highway 407
- Pioneer Village

on Line 2:

- Jane

on Line 6:

- Jane and Finch

In the City of Toronto, TTC routes 35 Jane operates from Pioneer Village station to Mount Dennis station, with a branch (35B Jane) going via Hullmar Drive between Steeles Avenue West and Finch Avenue West to serve the Black Creek neighbourhood, and 27 Jane South operates from Mount Dennis station to Jane station. Unlike the aforementioned 35 Jane (main branch 35A) and 27 Jane South, the 935 Jane Express serves all of Jane Street in Toronto, from Jane station to Pioneer Village station. There is also a Blue Night route that operates overnight, the 335 Jane. During rush hours, the 27/35/935 can be notoriously slow as a result of traffic congestion.

In York Region, York Region Transit (YRT) Route 20 Jane operates from Pioneer Village station to Teston Road. The route also makes intermediate connections with Highway 407 and Vaughan Metropolitan Centre stations.

The University portion of Line 1 Yonge-University parallels Jane between Pioneer Village and Vaughan Metropolitan Centre stations between Steeles and Highway 7.

=== History ===
Jane Street was the terminus of the defunct Bloor streetcar line until 1966, when the first leg of the Line 2 Bloor-Danforth subway opened to Keele station. The streetcar line continued to operate as a shuttle west of Keele station to Jane until 1968, when the subway was extended and Jane station opened.

Before 1971, Jane Street was broken north and south of present Eglinton Avenue. The 35 Jane would turn at Lambton, and past route 83 Tretheway to run north of Trethewey Drive to Steeles.

In 2014, the 195 Jane Rocket was designated as an express route on Jane St, connecting Jane station in the south with York University in the north. On December 17, 2017, both the 35 and 195 were changed at the northern end to serve Pioneer Village station on the day the new Toronto–York Spadina subway extension (which has its northernmost stretch and two stations; Highway 407 and Vaughan Metropolitan Centre running alongside and located near Jane) opened, with service around York University being replaced by York University station. In 2018, the 195 Jane rocket was renumbered and renamed to the 935 Jane Express as part of the TTC's rebranding of express bus routes.

On December 7, 2025, Line 6 Finch West opened, with a stop at Jane street.

=== Future ===
In Toronto, there are proposals to put RapidTO bus lanes on Jane Street between Eglinton and Steeles Avenues. Upon the opening of Line 5 Eglinton on February 8, 2026, the TTC splits the 35 Jane at Eglinton. The 35 Jane serves Jane Street north of Eglinton, while a new 27 Jane South route serves Jane Street south of Eglinton. With the Line 5 West Extension, there will be a new station at the intersection of Jane and Eglinton.

York Region also plans to operate a bus rapid transit line, Viva Silver, along Jane, as part of YRT's Viva services.

There is a proposal for a Jane LRT. However, plans for the LRT have become inactive in recent years as focus was made to other transit projects, including the Eglinton Crosstown and Finch West LRTs. In January 2018, the Jane LRT was tentatively listed as "Line 8" in the TTC's 2018–2022 corporate plan.

== Landmarks ==
List of landmarks along Jane Street from south to north.

Landmark	Cross Street	Images
Jane station	Bloor Street	
Jane and Finch stop	Finch Avenue	
The Village at Black Creek	Steeles Avenue	
Highway 407 station	Highway 407	
Vaughan Metropolitan Centre	Highway 7	
Vaughan Mills	Rutherford Road	
Canada's Wonderland	South of Major Mackenzie Drive	
Cortellucci Vaughan Hospital	Major Mackenzie Drive	
Holland Marsh	Davis Drive	

== See also ==
- List of north–south roads in Toronto
- List of numbered roads in York Region
