= Eglinton Crosstown west extension =

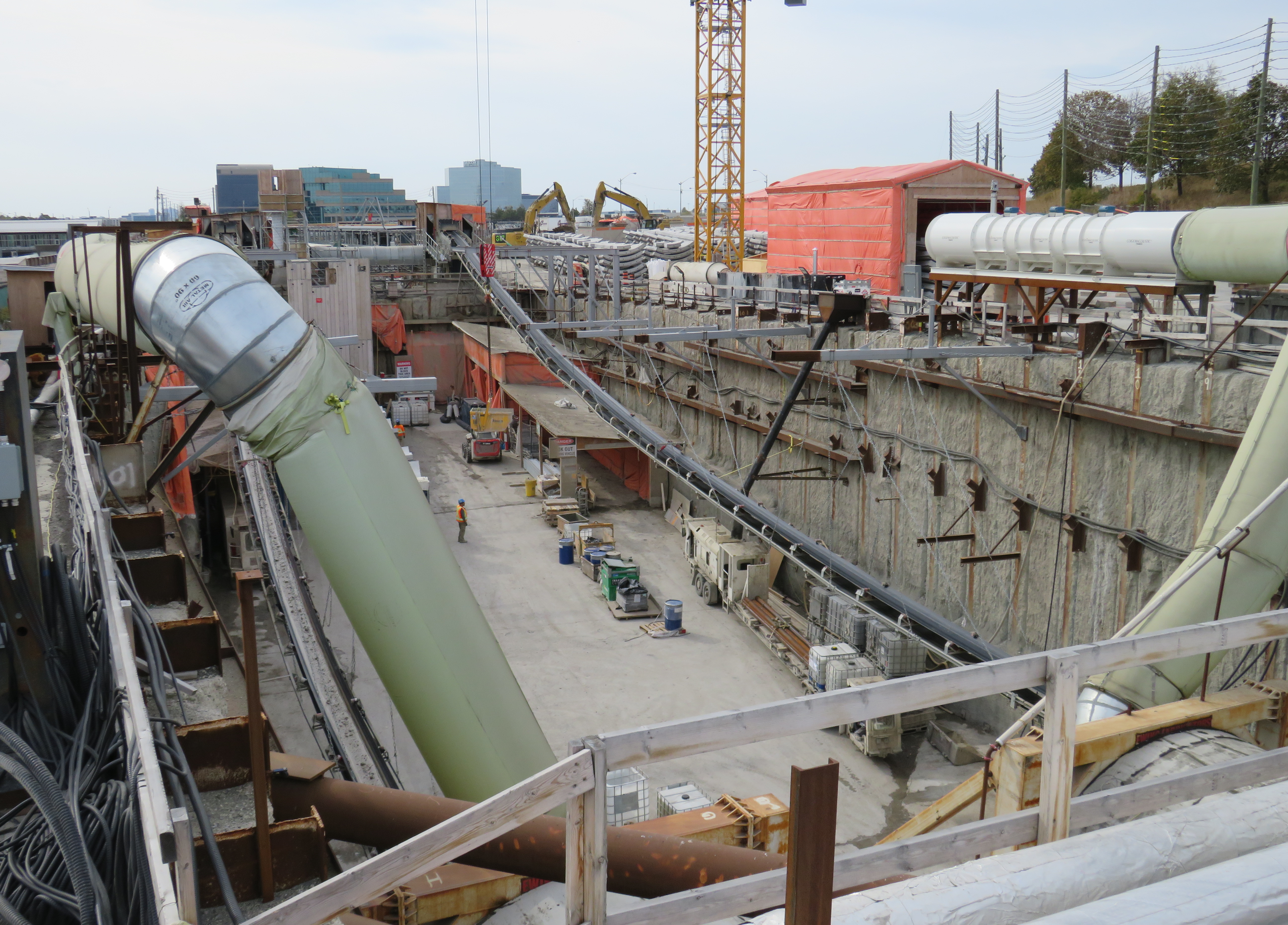
- Renforth station under construction in October 2023

Overview
- Status: Under construction
- Owner: Metrolinx
- Locale: Toronto and Mississauga, Ontario
- Stations: 7

Service
- Type: Rapid transit
- System: Toronto subway
- Operator: Toronto Transit Commission

History
- Planned opening: 2031

Technical
- Line length: 9.2 km (6 mi)
- Track gauge: 1,435 mm (4 ft 8 1/2 in) standard gauge
Route map

The Eglinton Crosstown west extension is an under-construction extension of the Toronto subway's Line 5 Eglinton west of Mount Dennis station to Renforth station in the adjacent City of Mississauga. The 9.2-kilometre (6-mile) extension will add seven new stations – four underground, two elevated and one within an open trench. The extension is expected to open in 2031.

The extension will continue the line westward along Eglinton Avenue from the existing Mount Dennis station at Weston Road. After a short tunnel, a 1.5-kilometre (0.93 mi) elevated structure will take the line over the Humber River, with two elevated stations located at Jane Street and Scarlett Road. The line will then head into a 6.3-kilometre (3.9 mi) tunnel, with four underground through-stations to be located at Royal York Road, Islington Avenue, Kipling Avenue, and Martin Grove Road. The line will then terminate at Renforth, a trenched station located beside the eastern terminal station of the existing Mississauga Transitway, a bus rapid transit (BRT) facility used by MiWay BRT routes and GO Transit bus routes.

Preliminary construction work began in 2020 when the first phase of Line 5 was itself under construction, with the tunnelling contract awarded in 2021. Forecast to serve 96,700 daily riders, the project was estimated in 2026 to cost CA$3.97 billion to construct. Metrolinx has proposed extending the line farther to Toronto Pearson International Airport in the future.

== History ==
Line 5 Eglinton was originally conceived as the Eglinton Crosstown LRT, a partially underground light rail line, announced in 2007 by Toronto mayor David Miller and TTC chair Adam Giambrone. It was part of the Transit City plan, which included the implementation of six other light rail lines across Toronto. The original version of the line would have run from Toronto Pearson International Airport along Eglinton Avenue to Kennedy station in Scarborough. Following funding and support from the Government of Ontario, the Eglinton Crosstown was built between 2011 and 2026 to a truncated route from Mount Dennis station to Kennedy station as the first phase. 25 stops and stations were built along the 19-kilometre (12 mi) route at a cost of CA$12.82 billion.

=== Surface station plan (2007–2019) ===
In a later phase, Metrolinx had planned for the Eglinton Crosstown to be extended westwards from Mount Dennis along Eglinton Avenue West to Toronto Pearson International Airport. However, during his successful campaign in the 2014 Toronto mayoral election, John Tory proposed SmartTrack, which would have included a heavy rail transit line established along this section of Eglinton Avenue. In 2016, the City of Toronto released a feasibility report that found this proposal would have significant capital costs ranging from $3.6 billion to $7.7 billion. In comparison, extending the Eglinton Crosstown as approved would cost $1.3 billion. It was also found that a light rail transit line would attract higher ridership than a heavy rail line.

Jennifer Keesmaat, the chief planner of the City of Toronto, recommended the extension of the Eglinton Crosstown line to Pearson Airport in lieu of establishing SmartTrack on Eglinton Avenue, based upon negative community impacts, higher costs, and lower projected ridership associated with a heavy rail corridor. On January 19, 2016, Tory agreed with the analysis and supported Metrolinx's original plan of extending the Crosstown. Tory included the Crosstown West as a light-rail component of his SmartTrack plan.

In June 2016, the estimated completion date was 2023. The estimated cost to build the Eglinton West LRT was $2.47 billion of which the City of Toronto would contribute $1.18 billion, the federal government would contribute $822.9 million, and the City of Mississauga and the Greater Toronto Airports Authority (GTAA), which operates Pearson Airport, would be asked to contribute $470 million for the portion of the line in Mississauga. Approvals for the financing were still to be secured as of November 2, 2016.

Public meetings for the extension, renamed the Eglinton West LRT, began November 13, 2017.

The 2010 environmental assessment (EA) for Transit City originally considered an entirely at-grade light rail line running west from Weston Road and Mount Dennis station. However, by October 2017, the city was considering grade separation using fly-overs and fly-unders at six intersections: Martin Grove Road, Kipling and Islington Avenues, Royal York and Scarlett Roads, and Jane Street, with surface running between stations.

On November 21, 2017, city staff recommended just ten stops along Eglinton West between Mount Dennis station and Renforth station on the Mississauga Transitway. That recommendation dropped the stops at Rangoon, East Mall, and Russell / Eden Valley.

At a city executive committee meeting on November 28, 2017, city staff recommended building the extension without any grade separation. City staff had concluded that a fully at-grade extension would provide better access for transit users and have fewer environmental impacts. Grade separation would have little improvement on traffic because the at-grade option would use signal coordination; however, grade separation would require fewer restrictions on left turns. There would be no difference in development potential with either option. However, because of feedback from the public and local politicians, Tory, by then mayor, recommended more study on grade separation. A fully at-grade extension was estimated to cost $1.5 to $2.1 billion. Grade separation would add an extra $881.9 million to $1.32 billion to that cost.

=== Grade-separated station plan (2019–present) ===
In April 2019, Ontario premier Doug Ford announced a plan for transit in the Greater Toronto Area. This included the planned extension of Line 5 Eglinton west to Pearson Airport, with a section of the line built underground from Royal York to Martin Grove. In February 2020, Metrolinx released an initial business case analysis of the project with four options, including three that were below grade. Metrolinx ultimately decided on a mostly grade-separated line with seven stations (four underground, two elevated, one at ground level). An updated EA was finalized in June 2020.

Building a mostly grade-separated extension was expected to cost $4.7 billion and would have seven stations and an estimated 37,000 daily boardings. By comparison, a surface line would have cost $2.9 billion and have had ten ground-level stations and an estimated 42,500 daily boardings. Travel time savings on an underground line would have been double that for a surface line and such a line would have been fully weatherproof except at the elevated section, but the reduction in stations was projected to have led to a lower estimated ridership, though local bus service would have been retained given the increased spacing between stations. During the 2018 Ontario general election, Liberal and Progressive Conservative candidates for Etobicoke Centre, Yvan Baker and Kinga Surma respectively, supported the mostly underground option. Of the three major parties, only Ontario NDP candidate Erica Kelly supported the surface option. Doug Ford, campaigning to become the premier of Ontario, preferred mostly underground construction.

==== Elevated route over the Humber River ====
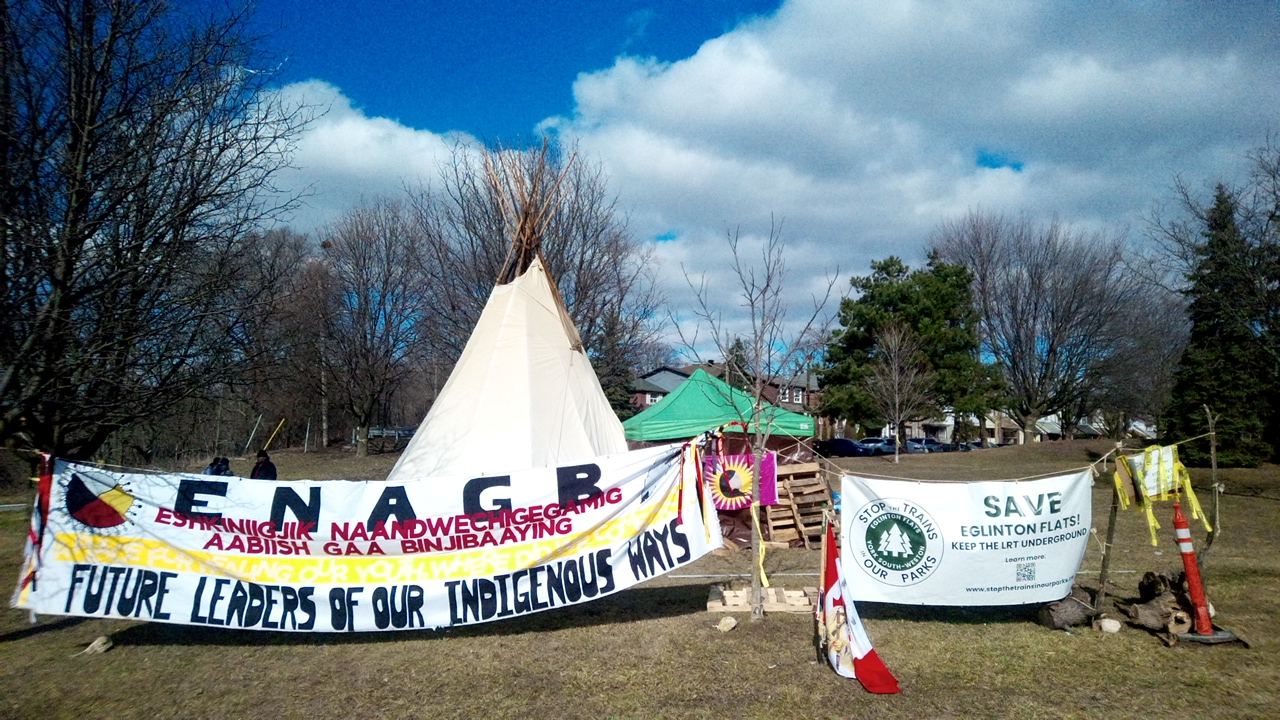
Tipi and protest by a coalition of Indigenous peoples against the decision by Metrolinx to run Line 5 Eglinton elevated near Jane Street

From 2022, a coalition of community groups (including local First Nations groups) objected to Metrolinx's decision to elevate the line to cross the Humber River. Concerns were raised regarding the impact on mature trees in the Humber River Valley near the proposed station at Jane and Eglinton – with community groups preferring a fully underground route. Metrolinx argued that the river valley had previously experienced extreme flooding issues in 1954 with Hurricane Hazel and again in 2013, and therefore an elevated route was most appropriate. Metrolinx also promised to plant trees to replace all trees cut down.

In 2023, protests against the elevated route took place, with a tipi and other temporary structures erected by local First Nations groups. The coalition asked Metrolinx to pause development until a resolution was found, as well as requesting more "transparency about the project – its costs, its size, and its impact". In 2024, an attempt by the coalition to seek an injunction that would prevent construction was rejected in the Ontario Superior Court of Justice.

== Construction ==
The delivery strategy from Metrolinx and Infrastructure Ontario includes four separate contracts: a first advance tunnel between Renforth Drive and Scarlett Road; a second advance tunnel between Jane Street and Mount Dennis station; an elevated guideway between Scarlett Road and Jane Street; and stations, rail and systems for the entire extension.

=== Advance tunnel 1 – Renforth to Scarlett ===
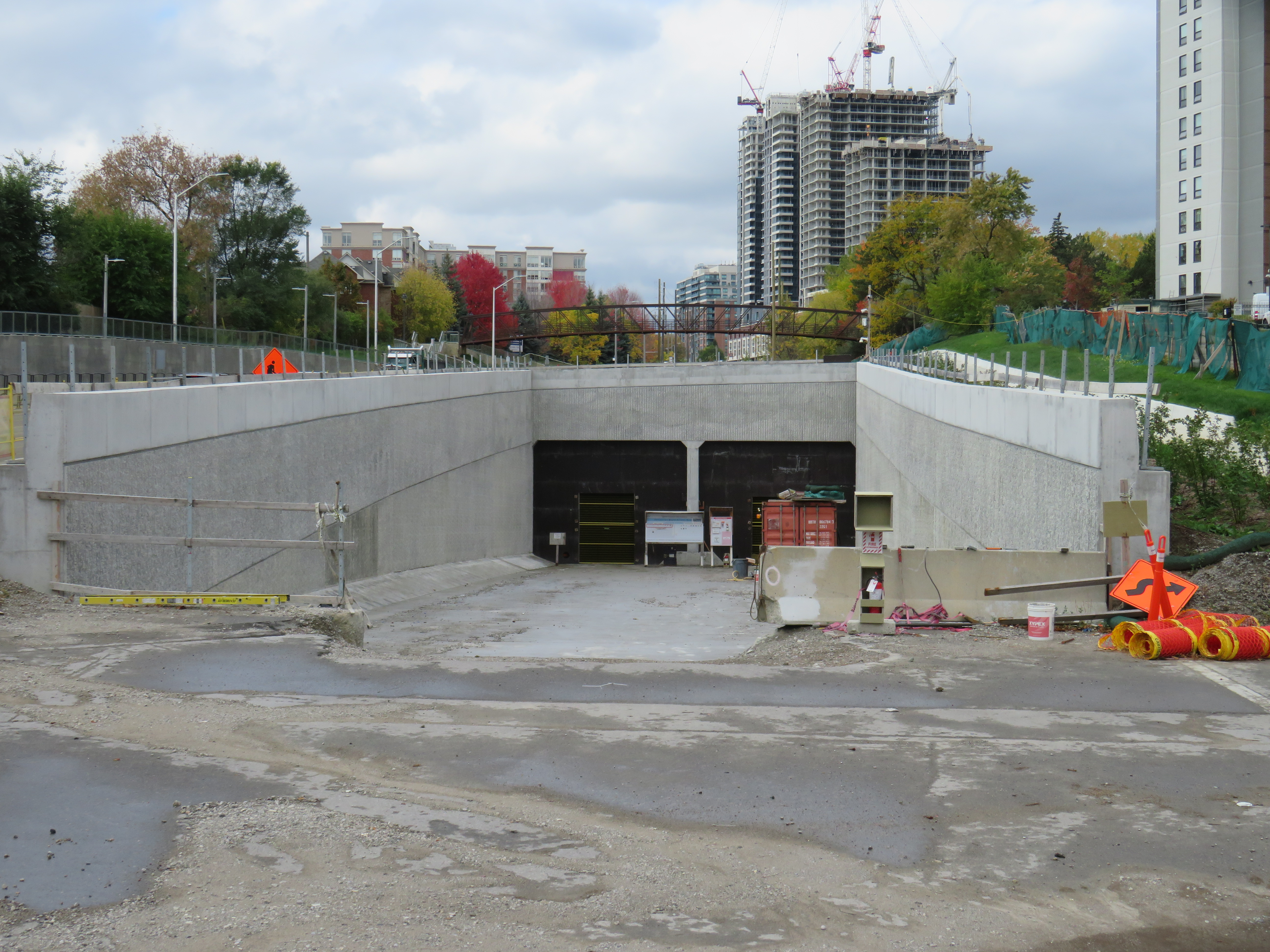
Sealed tunnel portal west of Scarlett Road in October 2025, where the line will transition between underground and elevated sections

On March 10, 2020, Metrolinx and Infrastructure Ontario issued a request for qualifications (RFQ) for the construction of tunnels, marking the first phase of procurement of the western Eglinton extension. On May 20, 2021, the design–build–finance contract was awarded to West End Connectors (a consortium of Dragados, Aecon and Ghella).

The contract included the design, construction and financing of:

- 6 kilometres (3.7 mi) of tunnels between Renforth Drive and Scarlett Road
- Advance civil engineering work (including headwalls for future construction of emergency exit buildings and the station)
- Activities necessary to build the tunnel (e.g. utility relocations, supports for shaft and headwalls, temporary power supply, lighting, ventilation, and drainage)

On April 11, 2022, tunnelling began from a launch shaft located adjacent to Renforth Transitway station; two tunnel boring machines (TBMs), dubbed Rexy and Renny, tunnelled 6 kilometres (3.7 mi) eastwards to west of Scarlett Road, where the extraction shaft was located. Each TBM, weighing about 750 tonnes (740 long tons; 830 short tons), and measuring 6.58 metres (21.6 ft) in diameter and 131 metres (430 ft) in length – longer than those used for the central section – bored tunnels 20 metres (66 ft) underground. Renny started boring in April 2022 but Rexy started later, in early August, as the launch area was only large enough to launch one TBM at a time. Tunnelling was completed two years later, with Renny breaking through the extraction shaft near Scarlett Road in May 2024 and Rexy breaking through three weeks later. The underground stations are being built using the cut-and-cover method as the stations are comparatively shallow and diversions can be made to accommodate construction as Eglinton Avenue's right-of-way is wide at that stretch as that right-of-way was originally reserved for the cancelled Richview Expressway.

=== Elevated guideway – Scarlett to Jane ===
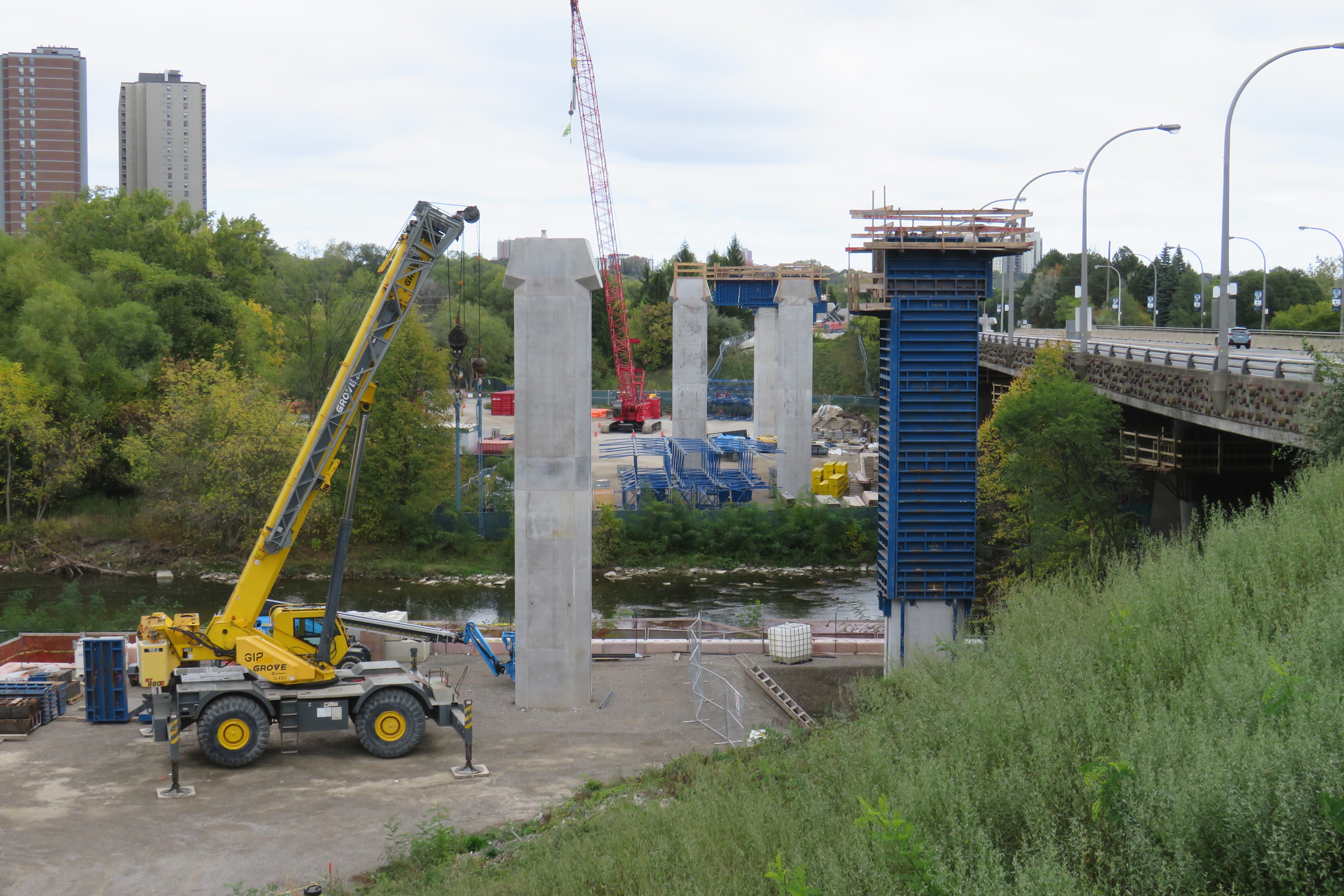
Construction of Humber River bridge piers in October 2025

In December 2021, Metrolinx issued a pre-qualification request for a design–build contract to build a 1.5-kilometre (0.93 mi) elevated guideway from the portal west of Scarlett Road to the portal east of Jane Street. This elevated guideway will connect both advance tunnel contracts and will take the line over the Humber River. On December 15, 2023, the contract was awarded to Aecon, with construction of the guideway beginning in the second quarter of 2025.

=== Advance tunnel 2 – Jane to Mount Dennis ===
On December 2, 2021, Metrolinx and Infrastructure Ontario issued the request for qualification (RFQ) for the construction of tunnels between Jane Street and Mount Dennis station. On February 16, 2024, the contract was awarded to Strabag. The contract included the design and construction of 500-metre (1,600 ft) tunnels from east of Jane Street to Mount Dennis station, as well as modifications to the station to enable through service. In February 2025, construction on this short stretch of twin tunnels began, using a technique called the sequential excavation method. Rather than using TBMs, this method involves "mining" tunnels in sections, then spraying shotcrete on the exposed walls to reinforce them. The tunnels were completed in August 2026.

=== Stations, rails and systems ===
On March 25, 2024, Metrolinx and Infrastructure Ontario issued an RFQ for the stations, rails and systems contract. This design–build contract involves:

- Construction of seven stations between Mount Dennis and Renforth (four underground, two elevated, and one at grade)
- Installation of 9.2 kilometres (5.7 mi) of rail track, signalling and train control systems, electrification, communications and other equipment
- Testing and commissioning of the line following construction

On September 27, 2024, Metrolinx and Infrastructure Ontario issued an RFP to the following teams: Integrated Transit Partners (Sacyr, NGE, Siemens, Hatch, Egis, Weston Williamson); Trillium Rail Partners (Amico, Alberici, Acciona, WSP); and WestEx Transit Solutions (Aecon, AtkinsRéalis, Pomerleau, Dragados, Arcadis). The successful proponent was to be invited into a two-year design development phase with Metrolinx, anticipated to have begun in mid-2025 so as to finalize pricing, scheduling, and scoping to reduce the risk of the project before major construction began.

== Stations ==
The Eglinton Crosstown West extension will have seven stations. Five located at cross streets have temporary working names that conflict with the names of existing stations or stops on Line 2 Bloor–Danforth and Line 6 Finch West. As was the case for stations on the existing Line 5, these stations will ultimately be given alternate names that reflect the surrounding neighbourhoods to avoid confusion with the existing stations or stops.

Future stations (listed from east to west)
| Station | Type | Notes | Future connections |
|---|---|---|---|
| Jane (Note: Working name that duplicates existing TTC station or stop name) | Elevated | | |
| Scarlett | Elevated | | |
| Royal York | Underground | | |
| Islington | Underground | | |
| Kipling | Underground | | |
| Martin Grove | Underground | | |
| Renforth | Open trench | Located on the north side of the existing bus rapid transit station at the eastern terminus of the Mississauga Transitway; only station in Mississauga | Miway and GO buses |

== Further extension to Toronto Pearson International Airport ==
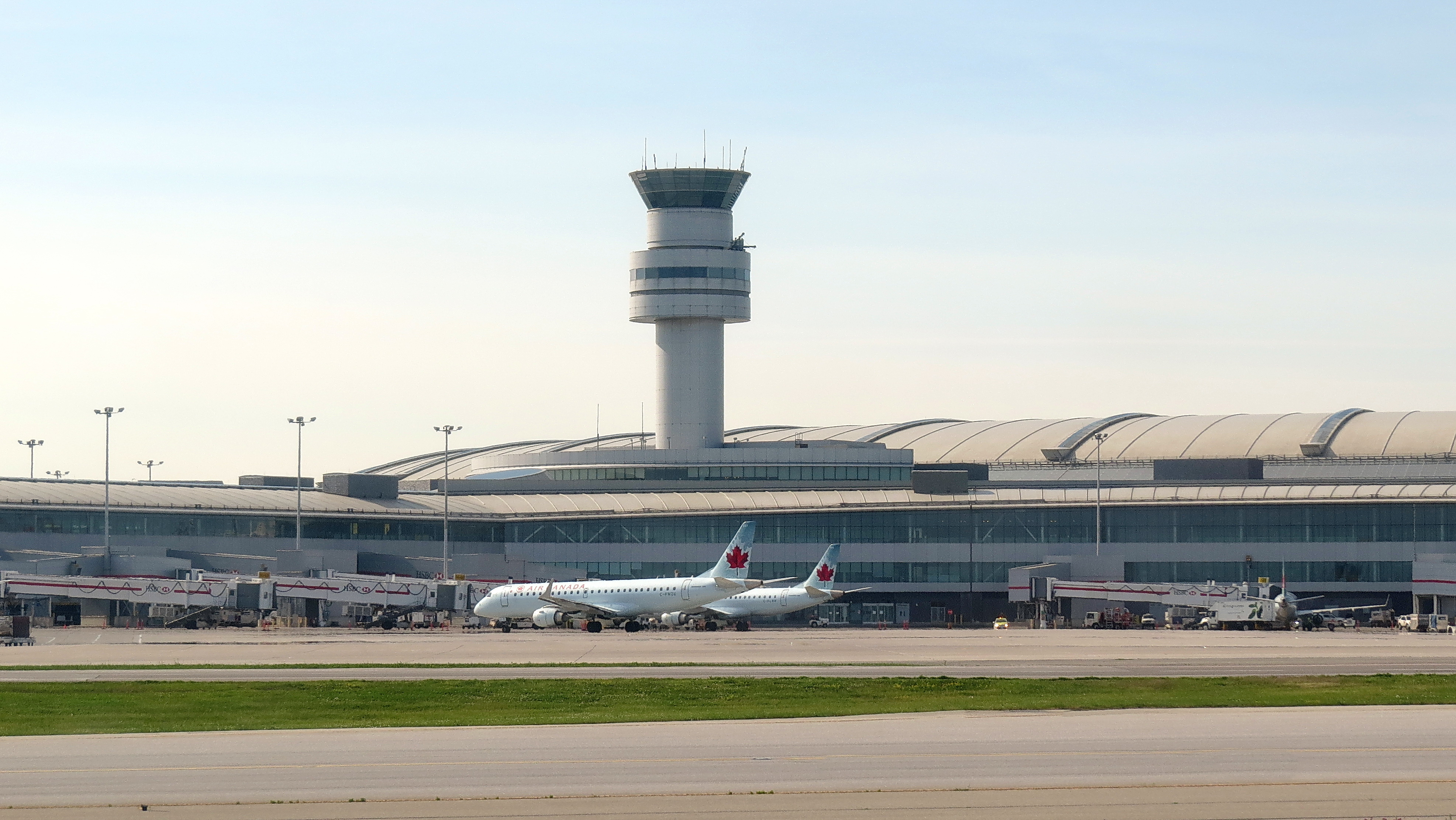
A further extension would take the line north from Renforth station to serve Toronto Pearson International Airport

A further extension would take the line north from Renforth station to Toronto Pearson International Airport. As of March 2024, the route for this extension had not been finalized, but a conceptual route curved to head north, crossed Highway 401, then followed Highway 427 north before turning west toward the airport terminals. In March 2024, Metrolinx was working with the Greater Toronto Airports Authority (GTAA), the airport's operator, on the project. The initial business case indicated intermediate stations at Convair and Silver Dart, with the terminus at Pearson Airport's planned Regional Transit Hub east of Airport Road.
