= Jane station =

Toronto subway station

Jane
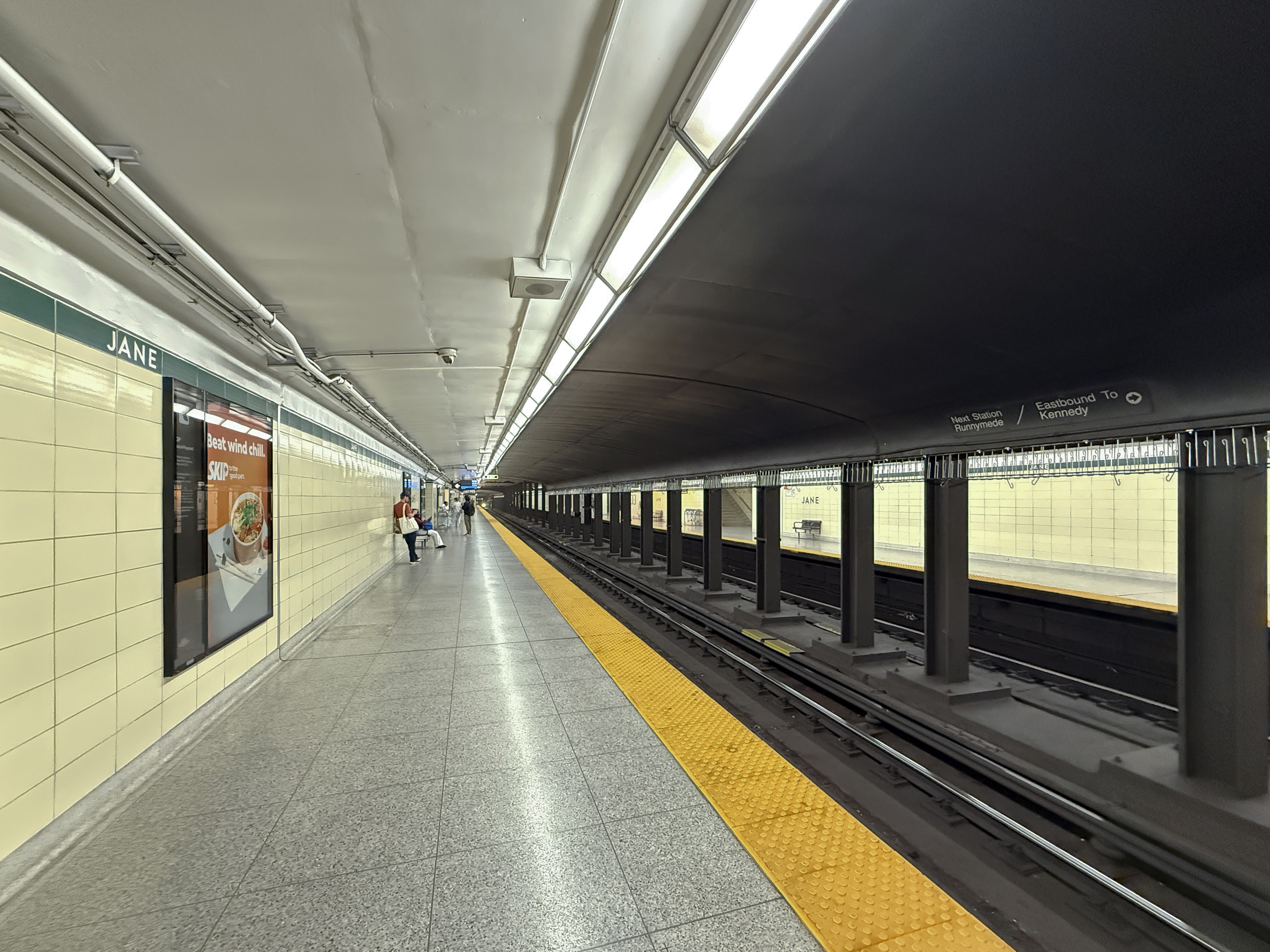
- Jane station platform

General information
- Location: 15 Jane Street; Toronto, Ontario; Canada
- Coordinates: 43°39′00″N 79°29′02″W
- Platforms: Side platforms
- Tracks: 2
- Connections: TTC buses: 26 Dupont; 27 Jane South; 55 Warren Park; 300 Bloor–Danforth; 335 Jane; 935 Jane Express

Construction
- Structure type: Underground
- Accessible: Yes

Other information
- Website: Official station page

History
- Opened: May 10, 1968; 58 years ago

Passengers
- 2023–2024: 14,953
- Rank: 49 of 70

Services
Preceding station	Toronto Transit Commission	Following station
Old Mill towards Kipling	Line 2 Bloor–Danforth	Runnymede towards Kennedy
Location

Jane is a subway station on Line 2 Bloor–Danforth of the Toronto subway in Toronto, Ontario, Canada. It is located just north of Bloor Street West, spanning the block east of Jane Street to Armadale Avenue, with entrances from all three streets. It opened in 1968 as part of the westerly extension from Keele to Islington Station.

In 2006, this station became accessible with the addition of elevators between the street and platform level.

== Entrances ==
The station's street entrances lead directly into the bus platform area in a layout that would not allow it to be readily brought into the station's fare-paid area. Until 1973 this was largely irrelevant because the station was on a fare zone boundary and the subway trains and some of the buses serving it were in separate zones.

At the west end, the Jane Street entrance is located just north of Bloor, on the east side of Jane Street. Similarly, at the other end of bus platform, there is an entrance directly from the west side of Armadale Avenue. Additionally, the station is accessible through automatic doors via a pedestrian walkway located mid-block on the north side of Bloor Street, between Jane and Armadale.

== Nearby landmarks ==
The station serves the local communities of Bloor West Village, Swansea, Runnymede, Old Mill and Baby Point and nearby destinations such as the Bloor West Health Centre, St. Pius X Catholic School, St. Olave's Anglican Church, Windermere United Church and Jane/Dundas Public Library.

== Surface connections ==
The station's bus platform is not within the fare-paid area.

TTC routes serving the station include:

Bay	Route	Name	Additional information
1	Spare, generally used for bus unloading		
2	55	Warren Park	Northbound to Warren Park
2	149	Etobicoke-Bloor	Westbound to Kipling station
2	Wheel-Trans		
3	26	Dupont	Eastbound to St. George station
4	935	Jane Express	Northbound to Pioneer Village station
5	27	Jane South	Northbound to Mount Dennis station
	335	Jane	Blue Night service; northbound to York University

== Transit City LRT plan ==
The now-cancelled Transit City proposal called for a new LRT line known as the Jane LRT line, running along Jane Street from Pioneer Village station to Jane station.

== Gallery ==
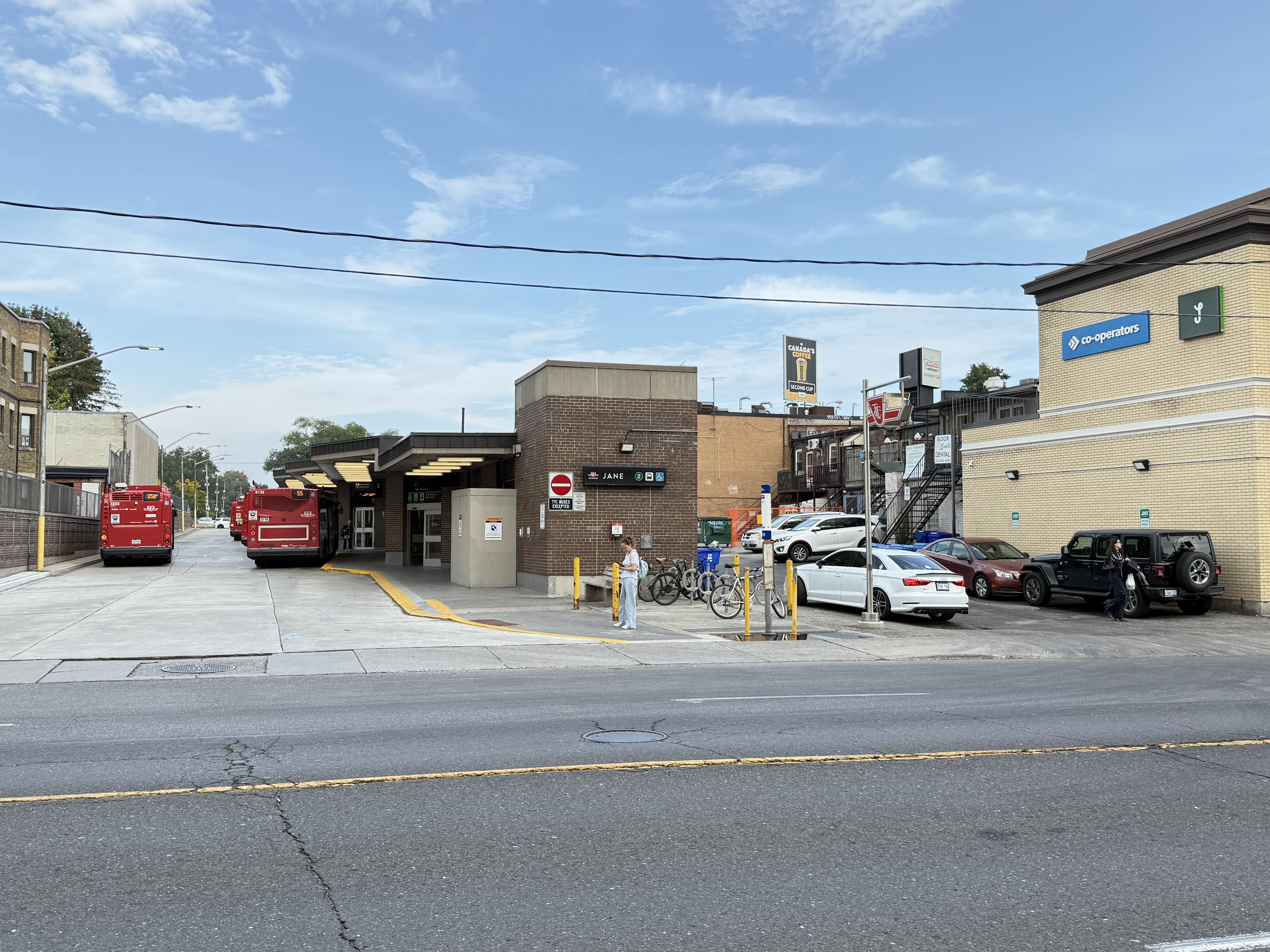
Exterior of station

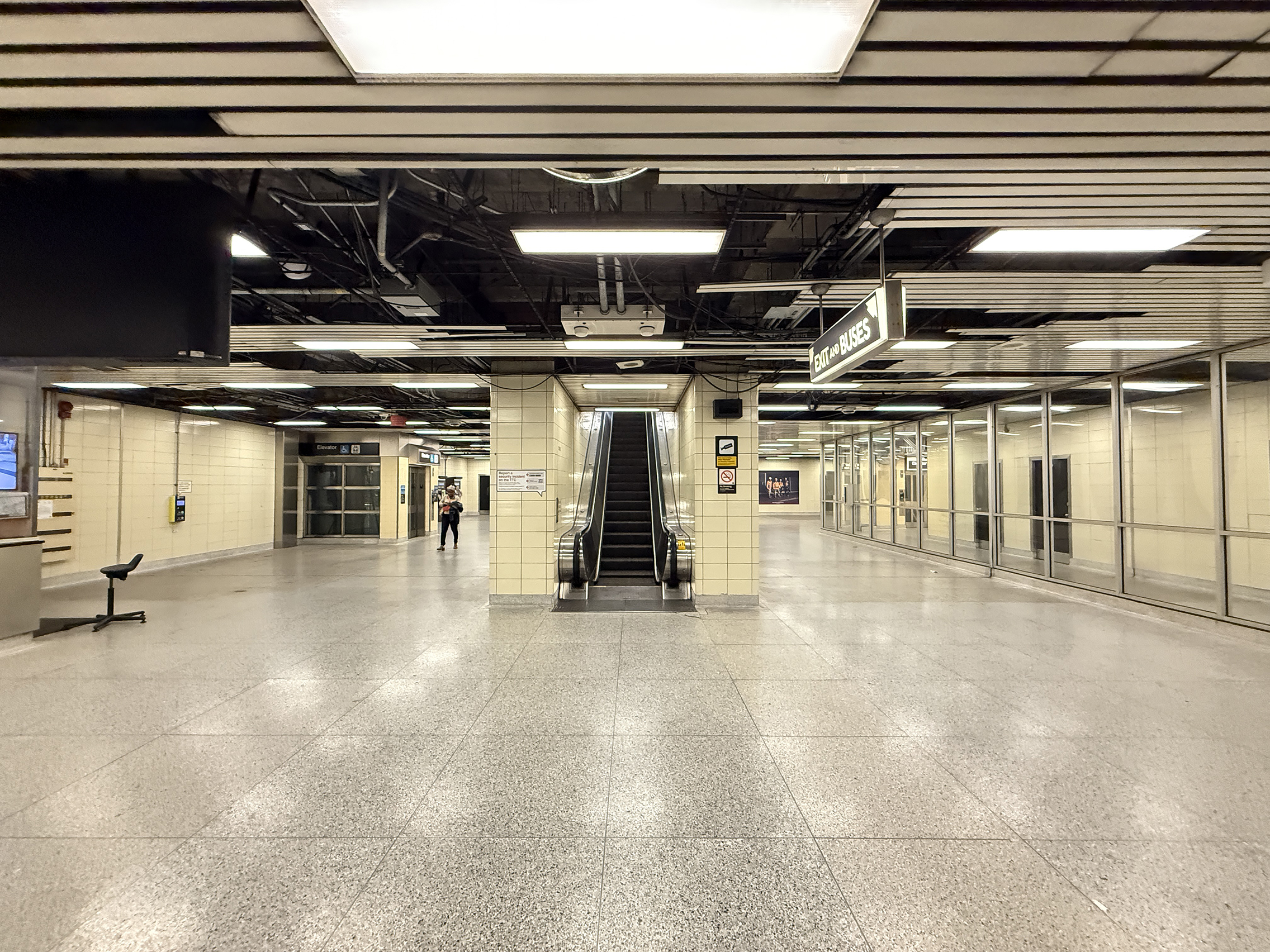
Concourse level

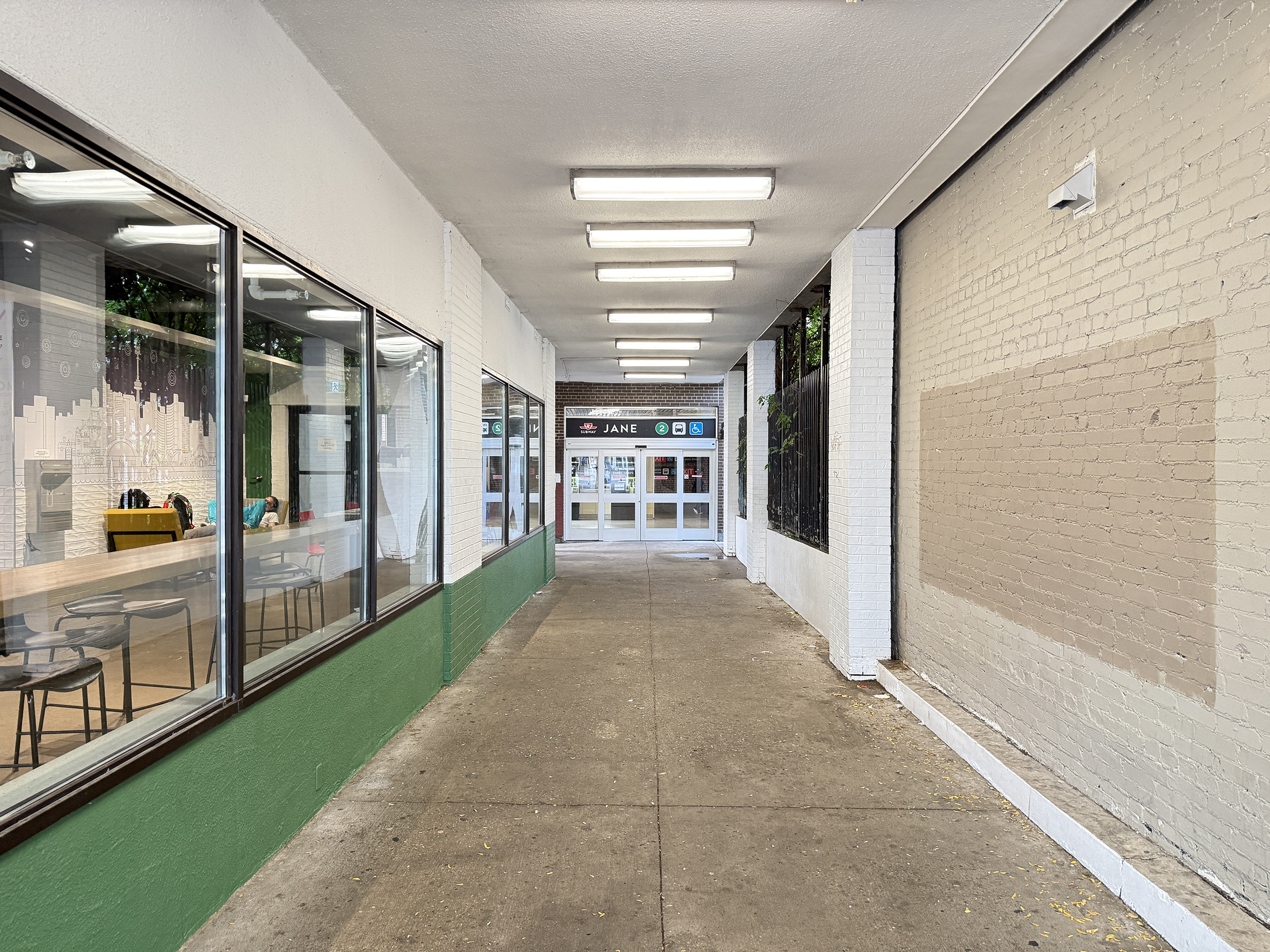
Accessible entrance from Bloor Street
