= Jane LRT =

Proposed light rail public transit line in Toronto, Canada

Overview
- Status: Inactive
- Locale: Toronto, Ontario
- Termini: Jane station; Pioneer Village station

Service
- Type: Light rail
- System: Toronto subway
- Operator: Toronto Transit Commission

Technical
- Line length: 16.5 kilometres (10.3 mi)
- Track gauge: 1,435 mm (4 ft 8 1/2 in)

The Jane LRT is an inactive proposal for a light rail line in Toronto, Ontario, Canada. It was originally proposed in 2007, cancelled in 2010, and later revived in the 2013 "Feeling Congested?" report by the City of Toronto, where it was labelled as a "Future Transit Project". However, in April 2019, Ontario premier Doug Ford announced the province's plans for rapid transit development and funding for the Greater Toronto Area that omitted the Jane LRT.

The transit corridor is currently served by the TTC bus routes 27 Jane South, 35A/B Jane, 335 Jane Blue Night, and 935 Jane Express within Toronto and York Region Transit's 20 Jane buses north of Steeles Avenue.

== History ==
It was originally part of the Transit City proposal announced in March 2007, to be operated by the Toronto Transit Commission. It was expected to cost approximately CA$630 million, with construction to begin in 2013 and opening in 2017. It was planned as the sixth of the seven Transit City lines to be completed.

The Jane LRT was cancelled by Rob Ford in December 2010 when he announced the cancellation of the entire Transit City project. While LRT lines on Sheppard East, Finch West, and Eglinton were revived through a new agreement between the City of Toronto and Metrolinx, the Jane LRT was not included at the time.

The Jane LRT is still included in Metrolinx's proposed regional transportation plan. In February 2016, City of Toronto planners and the TTC also recommended implementing the Jane LRT within 15 years. In January 2018, the Jane LRT was tentatively listed as "Line 8" in the TTC's 2018–2022 corporate plan. Aspects of the Jane LRT are currently incorporated into the 935 Jane Express bus which follows the LRT routing.

On 10 April 2019, Ontario premier Doug Ford outlined the province's plans for rapid transit development and funding for the Greater Toronto Area. These plans did not include the Jane LRT.

== Route layout ==
According to initial Toronto Transit Commission planning, the Jane LRT line would have run for 16.5 kilometres (10.3 mi) between Jane station on Line 2 Bloor–Danforth, and Pioneer Village station on Line 1 Yonge–University. Ridership was estimated to be 24 million trips in 2021.

Instead of turning onto Steeles Avenue towards Pioneer Village, The Big Move illustrates the Jane LRT running north into York Region and terminating at Vaughan Metropolitan Centre station.

=== Proposed stops/stations ===
- Bloor Street West at Jane station (connection to Line 2 Bloor–Danforth)
- Ardagh Street (surface LRT option only)
- Annette Street
- St. John's Road (surface LRT option only)
- St. Clair Avenue West / Dundas Street West (connection to future 512 St. Clair streetcar extension)
- Woolner Avenue (potential stop, surface LRT option only)
- Outlook Avenue
- Eglinton Avenue West (connection to Eglinton West extension of Line 5)
- Weston Road
- Trethewey Drive (surface LRT option only)
- Lawrence Avenue West
- John Street (potential stop, surface LRT option only)
- Maple Leaf Drive
- Falstaff Avenue (surface LRT option only)
- Wilson Avenue
- Heathrow Drive
- Exbury Road
- Giltspur Drive
- Sheppard Avenue West
- Rita Drive
- Grandravine Drive
- Yorkwoods Gate
- Yewtree Boulevard (potential stop)
- Finch Avenue West (connection to Line 6 Finch West)
- York Gate Boulevard
- Driftwood Avenue
- Shoreham Drive
- Steeles Avenue West
- Murray Ross Parkway
- York University at Pioneer Village station (connection to Line 1 Yonge–University)

== See also ==
- Toronto streetcar system
- Jane Street
