= West Highland Creek =

- Location of the mouth of the creek in Toronto

Location
- Country: Canada
- Province: Ontario
- Municipality: Toronto

Physical characteristics
- Source: L'Amoreaux Park
  - location: Steeles neighbourhood
  - coordinates: 43°49′00″N 79°18′15″W
  - elevation: 185 m (607 ft)
- Mouth: Highland Creek
  - location: Woburn neighbourhood
  - coordinates: 43°46′27″N 79°11′55″W
  - elevation: 99 m (325 ft)

Basin features
- Tributaries
  - left: Southwest Highland Creek

West Highland Creek is a river in Toronto, Ontario, Canada, and is a tributary of Highland Creek in the Lake Ontario drainage basin. The creek and its tributaries are entirely within the old City of Scarborough, and provide the watershed for the northwest of the city.

== Course ==
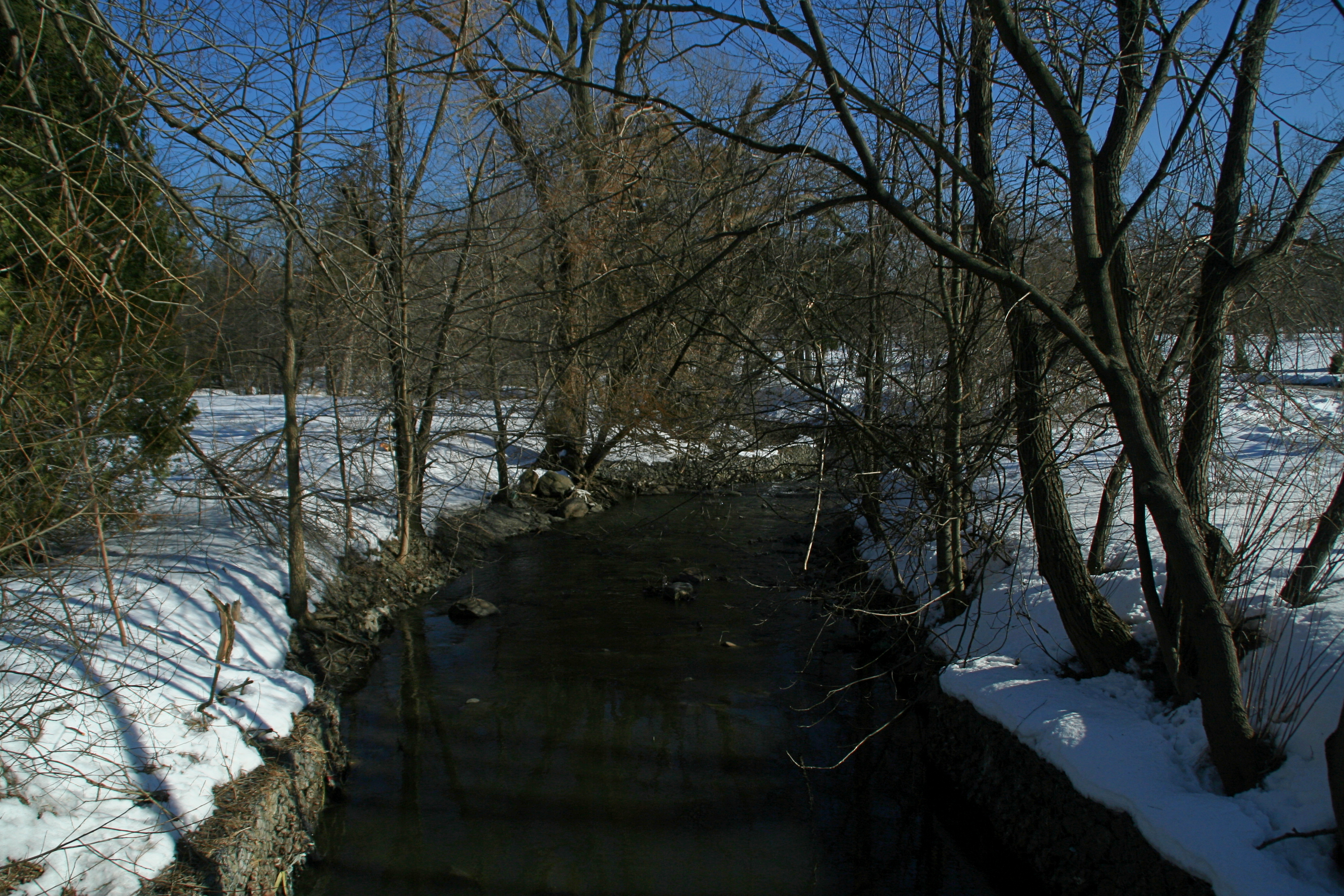
West Highland Creek in Thomson Memorial Park, Toronto.

West Highland Creek begins in the L'Amoreaux Park in the Steeles neighbourhood, just west of the Kennedy Road and north of the McNicoll Avenue, at an elevation of 185 metres (607 ft). It flows southwest, under McNicoll Avenue into L'Amoreaux neighbourhood, exits the park and passes under Birchmount Road and Finch Avenue. Just south of Finch Avenue, West Highland Creek takes in a right tributary unnamed creek. The creek then turns south and takes in another right tributary unnamed creek. It then turns southeast into Tam O'Shanter-Sullivan neighbourhood, passes again under Birchmount Road and into Tam O'Shanter Golf Club. West Highland Creek flows under Kennedy Road into Agincourt South-Malvern West neighbourhood and under Sheppard Avenue. It heads south under a grade-separated junction of a Canadian National Railway track (used by the GO Transit Stouffville line) and a Canadian Pacific Railway mainline. The creek flows south under Highway 401, loops west then back east under the Canadian National line, and turns east at the Scarborough RT line west of Midland Avenue. It passes under Midland into Bendale neighbourhood, then turns south under Ellesmere Road into Birkdale Ravine Park.

West Highland Creek then flows under Brimley Road into Thomson Memorial Park, then under McCowan Road into Woburn neighbourhood and further under Lawrence Avenue. It takes in the right tributary Southwest Highland Creek at an elevation of 138 metres (453 ft), passes under Bellamy Road, and takes in an unnamed right tributary creek at an elevation of 136 metres (446 ft). The creek heads east through Cedarbrook Park, under Markham Road and into Scarboro Golf and Country Club. It then heads northeast into Highland Creek Park, takes in an unnamed left tributary creek arriving from Curran Hall Ravine, and passes back under Lawrence Avenue. Finally, West Highland Creek enters Morningside Park and reaches its mouth at Highland Creek at an elevation of 99 metres (325 ft).

== Geology ==
The creek travels through a glacial ravine formed after the last ice age.

== Natural history ==
West Highland Creek is home to several species of fish including trout, carp, and bass.

== Recreation ==
Lands adjacent to the creek provide significant recreational space for the centre of Scarborough. These are anchored by L'Amoureaux Park, one of the largest in Scarborough at 145.3 acres (58.8 ha) and with major sports facilities, and Thomson Memorial Park. There are also two golf courses: the private Scarboro Golf & Country Club, 144 acres (58 ha) in area and opened in 1914, and the public Tam O'shanter. Cycling and walking trails line the entire course of the creek, with the exception of a central section around Highway 401 and on the private land of Scarboro Golf & Country Club.

== Tributaries ==
- Southwest Highland Creek

== See also ==
- List of rivers of Ontario
