= Brimley Road =

Thoroughfare in Toronto, Ontario

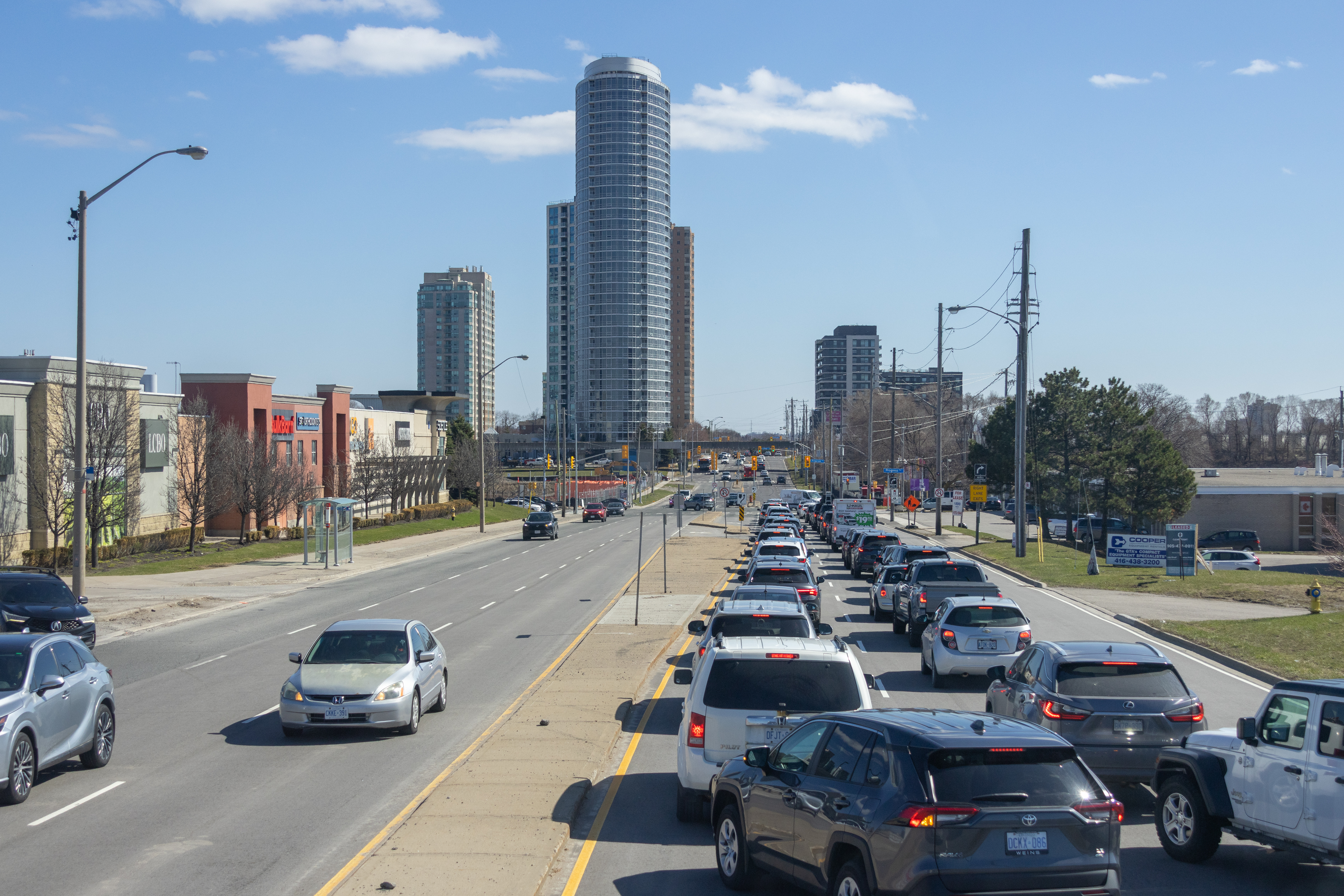
- Looking south along Brimley Road towards Progress Avenue

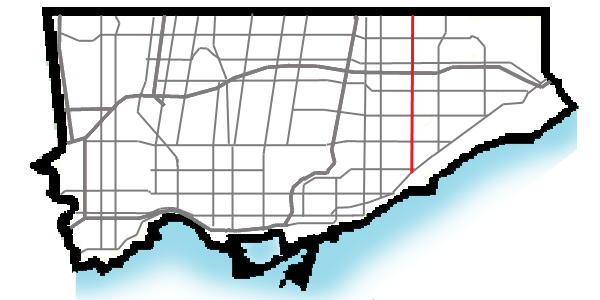
- Brimley Road in Toronto
- Type: Toronto
- Maintained by: City of Toronto; City of Markham
- Length: 16.1 km (10.0 mi)
- North end: 14th Avenue
- Major junctions: Steeles Avenue; Finch Avenue; Sheppard Avenue; Ontario Highway 401; Ellesmere Road; Lawrence Avenue; Eglinton Avenue; Danforth Road; St. Clair Avenue; Kingston Road
- South end: Scarborough Bluffs

Other
Nearby arterial roads in Toronto
← Midland Avenue	McCowan Road →

Brimley Road is a north–south street in Toronto and the Regional Municipality of York, Ontario, Canada. In Toronto, it is located entirely within Scarborough and carried 32000 vehicles daily in May 2007 Hence, it is classified as a major arterial road by the city of Toronto.

Beginning at Scarborough Bluffs by Lake Ontario, Brimley goes straight through Scarborough, past Steeles Avenue and ends at 14th Avenue in Markham. The Scarborough portion is mainly residential with small strip plazas along the way, and the super-regional mall, Scarborough Town Centre. North of Finch Avenue is Brimley Woods (Macklin's Bush), a small forest patch and now city park of what the area once looked like. Past Steeles, Brimley weaves through the residential areas of the Milliken community of Markham.

== History ==
The origins of the street's name is unknown, but it could be named for a village in Teignbridge in England given the origins of many of Scarborough's early settlers. Before the name came into use it was sixth concession east of Yonge Street. The name appeared in a 1933 map by the Ontario Department of Highways running from Kingston Road to Eglinton.

The corner of Brimley Road and Sheppard Avenue marks the central location around which the community of Agincourt was formed during the mid-19th century. The road has also come to border the neighbourhood Kennedy Park and the electoral districts Scarborough—Agincourt and Scarborough—Rouge River.

A museum off Brimley north of Lawrence Avenue East in Thomson Park pays tribute to the founding family of the former Township of Scarborough; West Highland Creek, a tributary of the Highland Creek, runs through the park.

=== 401 overpass ===
The section south of Sheppard was once interrupted at Highway 401. The construction of the highway lead to the break since the late 1940s and fully by 1956. An $11 million overpass and partial interchange of the freeway was built and opened on October 18, 1987 over the objections of many area residents on concerns over increased traffic volume. In an attempt to address these concerns, it was initially restricted to transit buses and emergency vehicles. After a few months of widely reported public pressure, Scarborough City Council voted February 18, 1988 to open the overpass to general traffic.

A partial interchange is provided between Brimley Road and Highway 401, with westbound access to Highway 401 from northbound Brimley Road, and southbound access to Brimley Road from eastbound Highway 401. Eastbound traffic may also access northbound Brimley Road via the Progress Avenue exit.

== Public transit ==
The main Toronto Transit Commission bus route on Brimley Road is the 21 Brimley, which runs from Steeles Avenue to Eglinton Avenue, stopping on the way through the Scarborough Centre RT station. At Eglinton, it turns west to the Kennedy subway station. The old route of 128 Brimley North, which originally ran from Scarborough Centre to Steeles through McCowan Road and Sheppard Avenue, had started when the RT opened in 1985 and merged with the 21 in 1999. Prior to 1985, TTC service on Brimley north of Sheppard was served by a branch of the 57 Midland route:

- 1970 57 Midland via Brimley ran on southbound on Brimley from Finch Avenue to Huntingwood Avenue.
- 1976 57A Midland providing bi-directional service on Brimley from Sheppard Avenue to Finch Avenue.
- 1980 57A extended to Passmore Avenue.

The 57A route would continue until it was replaced by 128 Brimley North route.

The 12A/B Kingston Road also serves Brimley from Kingston Road to Eglinton. South of Kingston Road, Brimley Road South has served as the off-street loop for a number of routes since the 1950s, with the 12 Kingston Road doing this since 1968. The 201 Seasonal Bluffer's Park route serves Brimley Road from Eglinton to the Bluffs (Brimley Road South) during the summer.

In 2002, the TTC examined the feasibility of building a Scarborough RT station at Brimley Road. It concluded that demands are not enough, and instead a pedestrian walkway was built towards Scarborough Centre station. In 2007, it was stated that the issue will be re-examined when significant land developments take place west of Brimley Road near the proposed location of Brimley station. In February 2008 the TTC made a motion that the current study should include the addition of a station where the existing line crosses Brimley Road.

From September 1989 to September 1993 Brimley Rd North of Steeles was served by 128A Brimley North from Scarborough Centre to 14th Avenue by the TTC. In September 1993 for about a year Markham Transit took over operations on Brimley Road between Steeles Avenue and 14th Avenue as Route 6 Brimley while TTC operated south of Steeles Ave to Scarborough Centre (128 Brimley North). To this day there is no bus service on Brimley Rd North of Steeles Ave due to low ridership (servicing an area without connecting east–west route). Until the closure of the Scarborough RT in 2023, the 903 Kennedy–Scarborough Centre Express (then known as the 131E Nugget Express from September 2000) ran on Brimley between Scarborough Centre and Eglinton during peak hours, stopping only at Lawrence Avenue.

== Landmarks ==
- Brimley Woods Park
- Former C.O. Bick Police College (Now a private high school)
- Chartwell Plaza - Asian mall
- Oriental Centre - Asian mall
- Scarborough Town Centre
- Thomson Memorial Park and Scarborough Memorial Museum
- St. Augustine Seminary
- Bluffer's Park
- Historical Cemeteries
  - Holy Blossom Memorial Park; Jewish cemetery on west side of Brimley north of St Clair Avenue
  - Resthaven Memorial Gardens; west side between St Clair Avenue and Kingston Road.
  - St Andrew's Cemetery, east of Brimley on St Andrew's Road.
- Ebenezer United (formerly Methodist) Church, northwest corner of Steeles and Brimley in Markham built 1876 replacing earlier one at southeast corner on Thomas Harding farm in Scarborough c. 1852
