= Thomson Memorial Park =

Park in Toronto, Canada

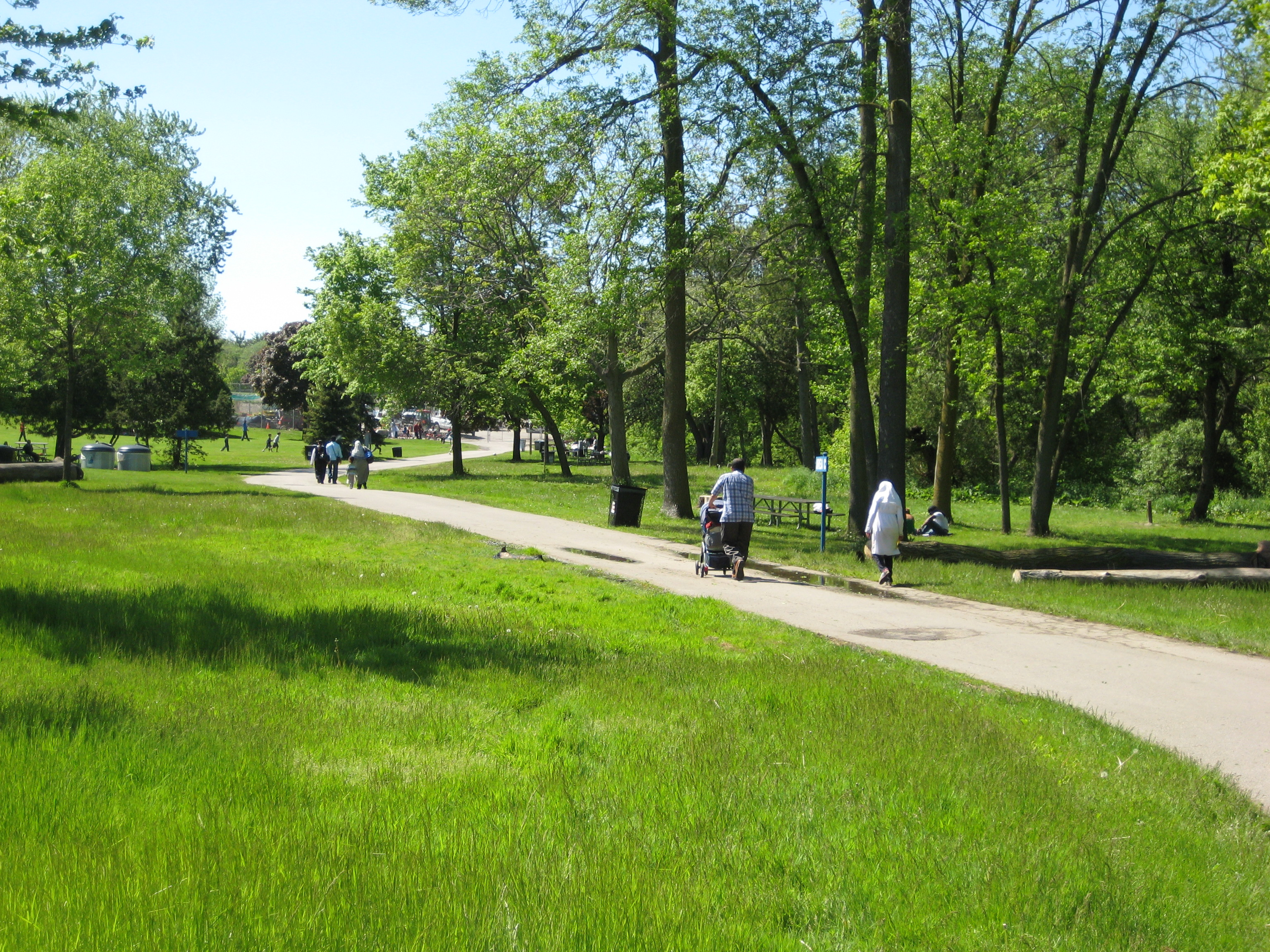

- Location within Toronto
- Type: Urban park
- Location: 1005 Brimley Road; Toronto, Ontario; M1P 3E9
- Coordinates: 43°45′28″N 79°15′19″W
- Area: 41.8 hectares (103.3 acres)
- Owner: City of Toronto
- Operator: Toronto Parks, Forestry & Recreation

Thomson Memorial Park is a midsize park at 1005 Brimley Road in the Scarborough district of Toronto, Ontario, Canada. It is the site of the Scarborough Historical Museum and includes historical houses from the 1790s that once belonged to the founding family of Scarborough, the Thomsons. More Thomson family houses are located at the northern edge of the park on St. Andrew's Road (numbers 1 and 142 have designating plaques), as well as the adjacent St. Andrew's Presbyterian Church (1818) and cemetery.

Located near Lawrence Avenue East and Brimley Road, the park has, among other facilities, an outdoor baseball diamond and soccer field in the north end, and tennis courts to the south. It also has picnic areas, playgrounds, wading pools, and dog parks.

The park follows the West Highland Creek, a tributary of the Highland Creek, and is served by bicycle paths. There are also many paths located throughout the wooded ravines, showing a glimpse of the nature within the city.

In 1956, a site north of the creek at Brimley Road was excavated and assessed by the University of Toronto. It was determined to be a Huron-Wendat village site dating to the late 1200s. The site is believed to be linked to the Taber Hill ossuary located a few kilometres east. The spot is marked by a plaque erected by the Township of Scarborough. At the time, the Reeve of Scarborough, Gus Harris, was seeking to open a museum or recreated "Indian village" as an attraction for Scarborough. Another Huron-Wendat village site was found in 2000 north of L'Amoreaux Park (North), which may also be linked to this site.

== See also ==
- List of oldest buildings and structures in Toronto
