= Woburn, Toronto =

Woburn
- Neighbourhood
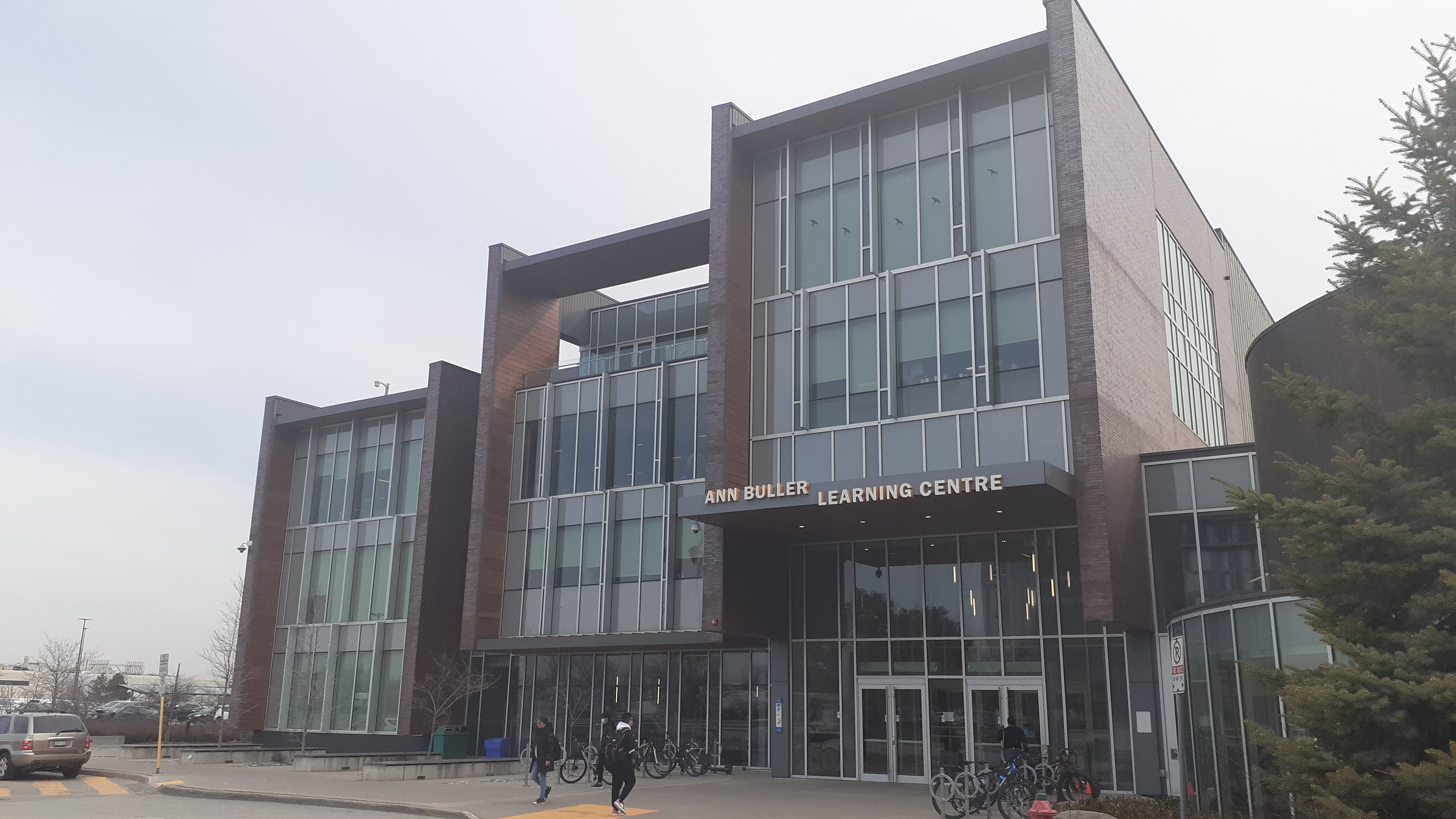
- View of Woburn from Centennial College's Progress Campus

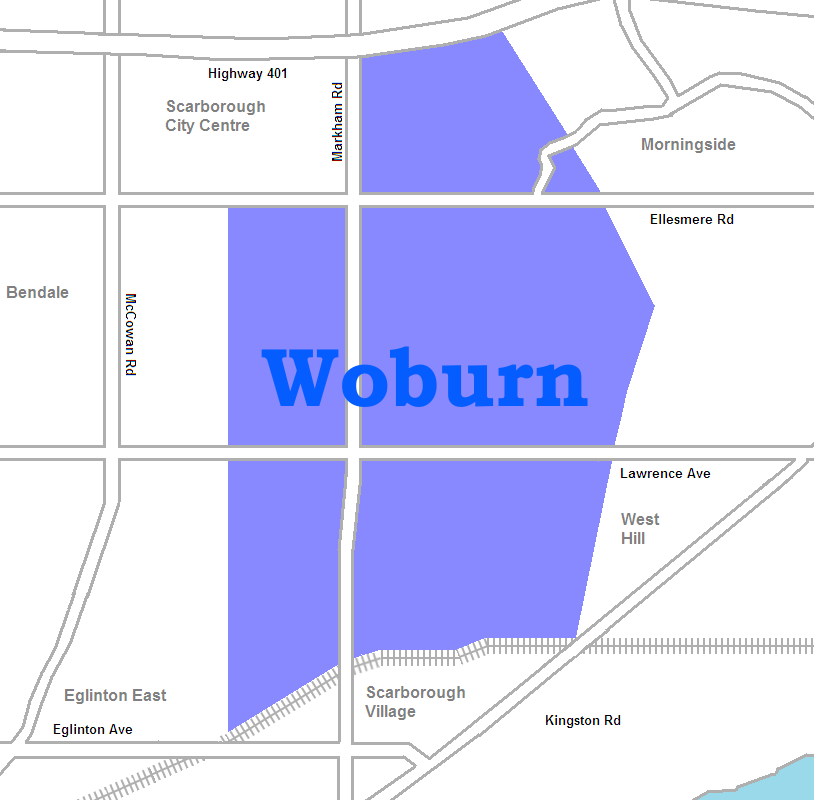
- Coordinates: 43°46′00″N 79°13′40″W
- Country: Canada
- Province: Ontario
- City: Toronto
- Established: 1850 Scarborough Township
- Changed municipality: 1998 Toronto from City of Scarborough

Government
  - MP: Michael Coteau (Scarborough—Woburn)
  - MPP: Andrea Hazell (Scarborough—Guildwood)
  - Councillor: Paul Ainslie (Ward 24 Scarborough—Guildwood)
- Elevation: 157 m (515 ft)
- Time zone: UTC-5 (EST)
  - Summer (DST): UTC-4 (EDT)
- Area codes: (416) and (647)

Woburn is a neighbourhood located in eastern Toronto, Ontario, Canada, in the former suburb of Scarborough. Woburn is bordered by Highway 401 to the north, Orton Park Road to the east, Lawrence Avenue to the south, and McCowan Road to the west. A sub-neighbourhood, which compromises the eastern section of Woburn, named Curran Hall, borders Highland Creek river to the east, Lawrence Avenue to the south, Scarborough Golf Club Road to the west and Ellesmere Road to the north.

Residences are split between high rises and single detached homes, which account for almost ninety per cent of all residences.

== History ==
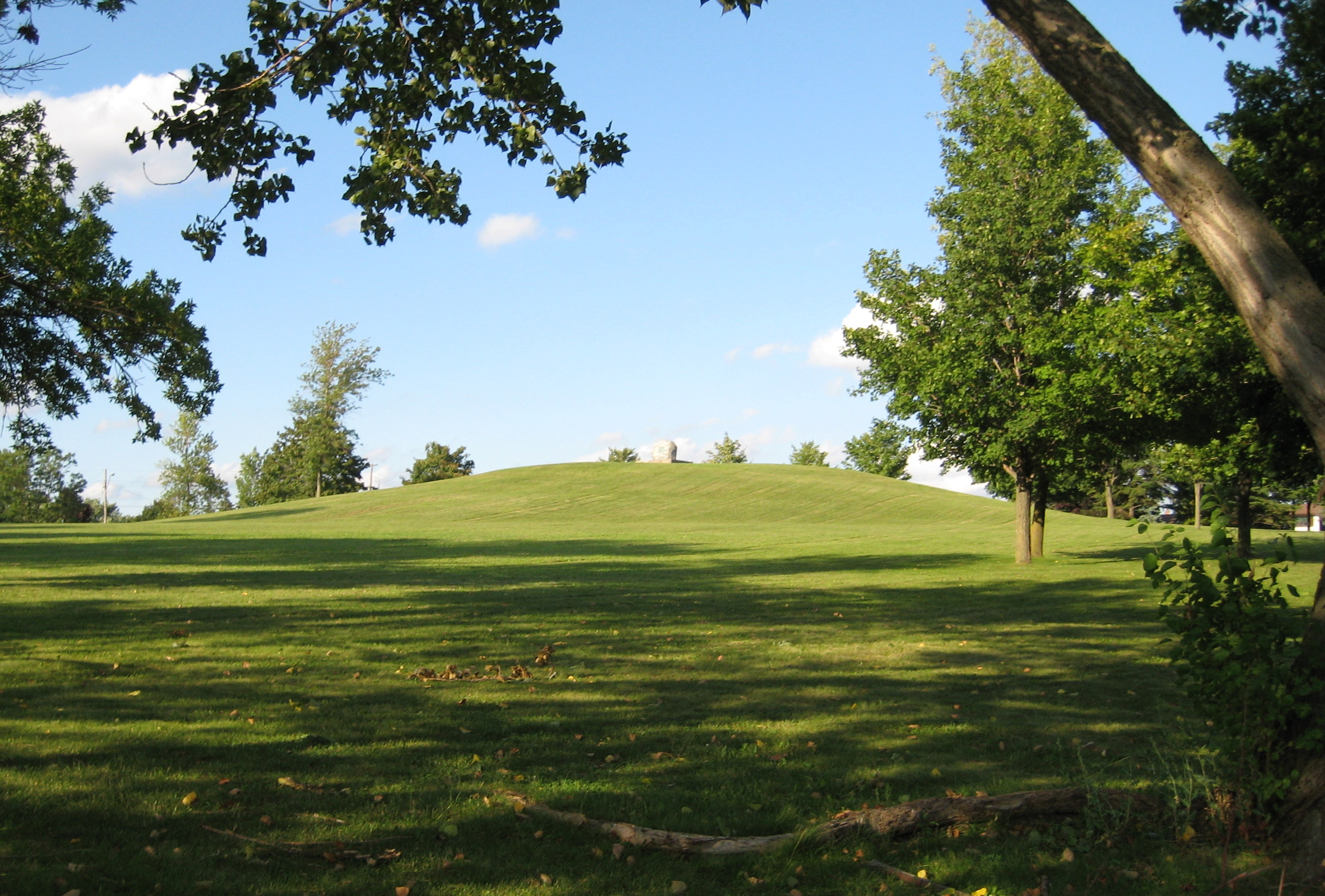
Taber Hill is a Wyandot burial mound in Woburn, dating back to 1250.

A Wyandot burial mound, Taber Hill is situated in Woburn. Dating to 1250, the burial mound contains over 500 graves, with skeletons buried in a manner consistent with the Huron Feast of the Dead.

A post-office south of Painted Post Drive (formerly Danforth's Road) and Markham Road, and a schoolhouse on Ellesmere Road west of The Markham Road, today the site of Woburn Collegiate Institute, were important sites in the early community.

The intersection of Painted Post and Markham Road was also the site of the Woburn Hotel, and across the road was the Woburn Hall. The Woburn Hotel housed the meetings of the first Scarborough Council from 1850 until 1922.

Painted Post Drive connected Woburn to the southwest via Danforth Road and Danforth Avenue to Toronto, and to the east via Military Trail and Colonel Danforth Trails to Kingston Road and points east (for more details, see Danforth Avenue).

== Education ==
Two public school boards operate elementary schools in Woburn, the secular Toronto District School Board (TDSB), and the separate Toronto Catholic District School Board (TCDSB). TDSB and TCDSB elementary schools include:

- Bellmere Junior Public School is a one-storey school designed by architect, John Andrews, who also designed the University of Toronto's Scarborough College and The Arab Pavilion for Montreal's Expo '67. The school opened in 1965 as a K-8 school and gained junior status in 1968. In the 1970s, Bellmere had a huge fire in four of its classrooms and the library. A blazing fire burned through Bellmere's rooms and created an enormous disaster. Fortunately, no one was injured. The library was moved into the gym and a new gymnasium and classrooms were built on the site of the fire. Bellemere is a feeder school for J.S. Woodsworth.
- Cedarbrook Public School (TDSB)
- Churchill Heights Public School, also known as Churchill Heights Junior Public School, was built and opened to students in September 1957 by the Scarborough Board of Education, as a Kindergarten to Grade 8 school to serve the post-war communities in the Curran Hall area. In 1971, with the opening of Henry Hudson Senior Public School, Churchill Heights became a Kindergarten to Grade 6 school. In addition, the school has been the home for Scarborough's gifted programme for exceptional students, when classes for gifted students were created, which made Churchill Heights a dual-track school. It is a feeder school for Woburn Collegiate Institute for the gifted program, as Churchill Heights is where the majority of the students in Woburn originate from, although the regular programs beyond grade 6 are at Henry Hudson, and there is therefore a strong partnership between the two schools. Before 1963, it was aligned with West Hill Collegiate Institute. Some examples of the partnership of these two schools are the Robotics and PEG programs, which have Churchill Heights students participating on Woburn teams, and Woburn mentors helping Churchill teams. However, some Churchill Heights gifted graduates also attended St. John Paul II Catholic Secondary School as well. Churchill Heights has notable programs such as the Programming Enrichment Group (PEG), Lego Robotics and its music program with various awards. Ed Robertson and Steven Page of the Barenaked Ladies attended this school.
- Cornell Junior Public School (TDSB)
- George B. Little Public School (TDSB)
- Golf Road Junior Public School (TDSB)
- Heather Heights Junior Public School (TDSB)
- Henry Hudson Senior Public School (TDSB)
- St. Barbara Catholic School (TCDSB)
- St. Richard's Catholic Elementary School (TDSB)
- St. Thomas More Catholic School (TCDSB)
- Tecumseh Senior Public School (TDSB)
- Tredway Woodsworth Public School is located on 112 Sedgemount and is named after a prominent Scarborough pioneer. The school opened in September 1956 as William Tredway Public School with ten classrooms and one Kindergarten room. In September 1969, William Tredway became a junior school when J.S. Woodsworth Senior Public School opened with 628 students in attendance, named after James Shaver Woodsworth. William Tredway and JS Woodsworth combined in 2015 to become Tredway Woodsworth Public School and now operates from Kindergarten to Grade 8.
- Willow Park Junior Public School (TDSB)
- Woburn Junior Public School opened in September 1964 as a successor to Woburn Public School (S.S.#6) with a student population of 200. The original school was built in 1863 and closed in 1956 with the building demolished in 1963 to make way for the present Woburn Collegiate Institute.

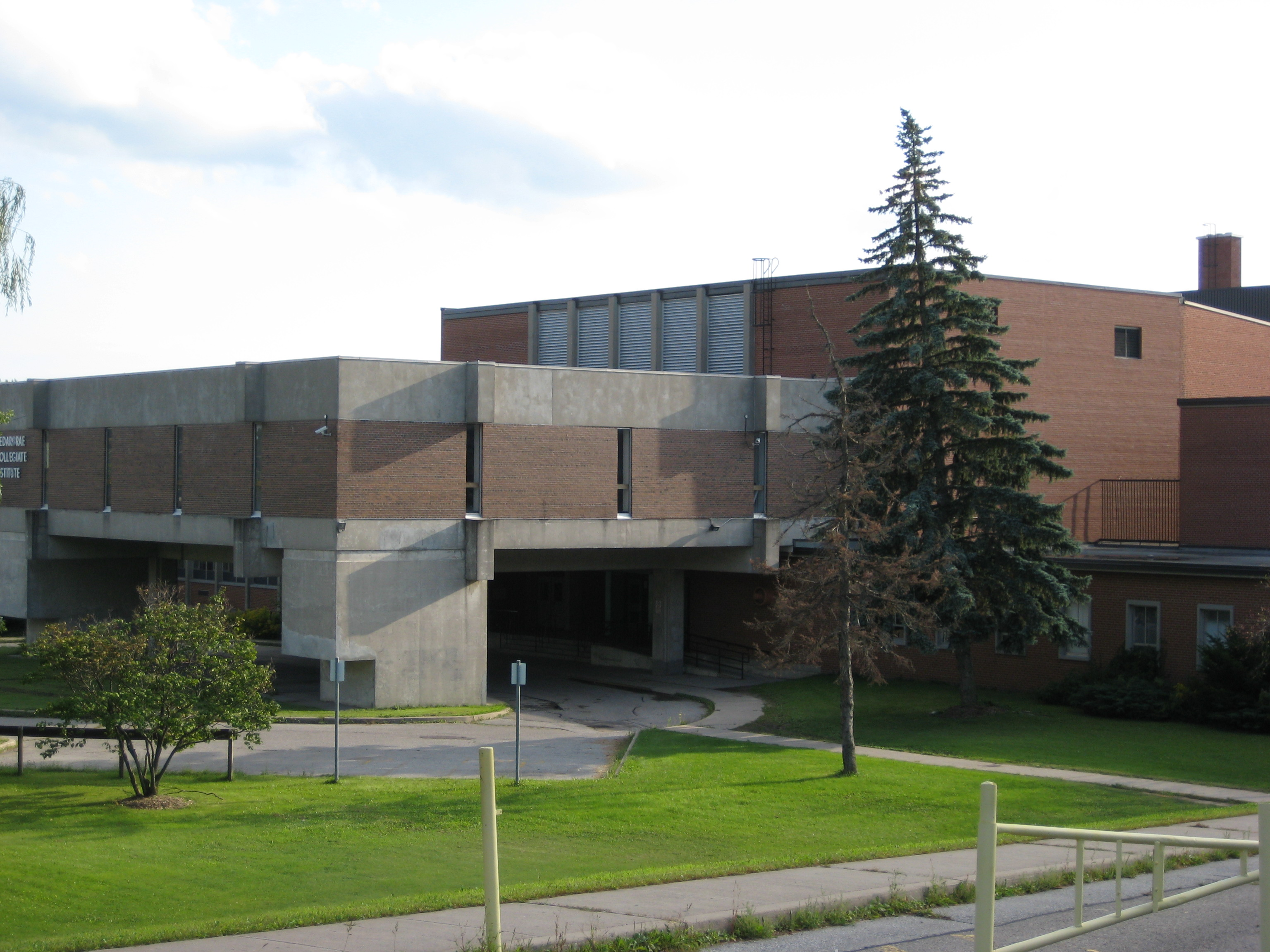
Cedarbrae Collegiate Institute is a public secondary schools in Woburn.

In addition to elementary schools TDSB also operates two secondary school in Woburn, Cedarbrae Collegiate Institute, and Woburn Collegiate Institute. TDSB is the only school board to operate a public secondary school. The French-based public secular school board, Conseil scolaire Viamonde, and it separate counterpart, Conseil scolaire catholique MonAvenir also offer schooling to applicable residents of Woburn, although they do not operate a school in the neighbourhood.

Along with primary and secondary education institutions, Woburn is also home to the Progress Campus of Centennial College, a post-secondary college.

== Recreation ==
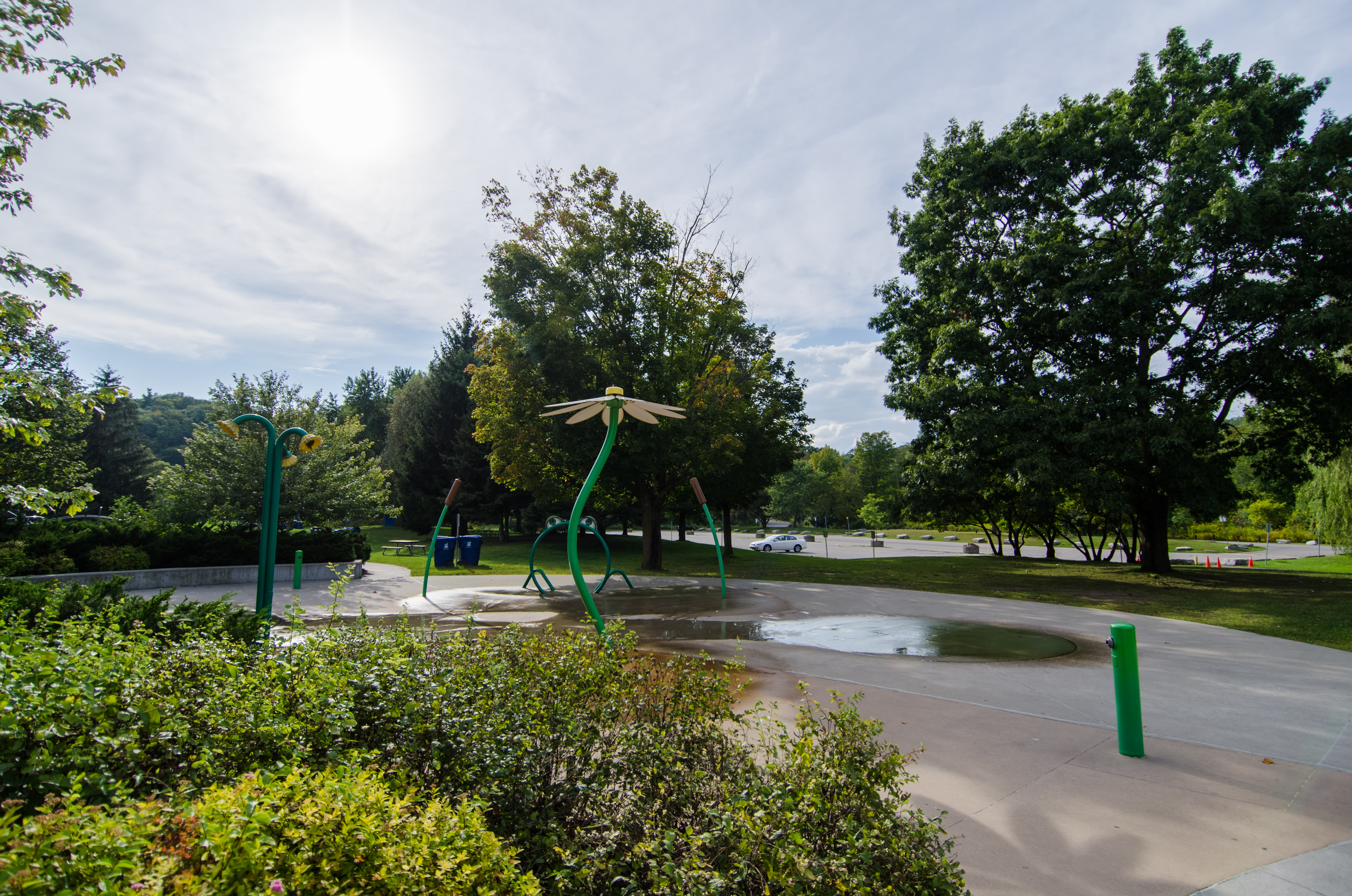
Morningside Park is a municipal park located in Woburn.

The south and south east sections of Woburn, along West Highland Creek, have a great amount of green space, echoed by the tree lined and winding roads typical of the neighbourhood. Woburn holds a number of undeveloped green space, making up portions of the Toronto ravine system. In addition, Woburn is home to several municipal parks, including Cedar Ridge Park, Curran Hall Ravine Park, Highland Creek Park, and Morningside Park. Municipal parks in Toronto are maintained by the Toronto Parks, Forestry and Recreation Division.

In addition to municipal parks, the division also manages local community centres situated in the neighbourhood, including Cedar Brook Community Centre, and Curran Hall Community Centre. The neighbourhood is also home to several shopping plazas and a mall, Cedarbrae Mall.

== Transportation ==
The neighbourhood is served by Toronto Transit Commission (TTC) bus system. These include the 54 Lawrence East, 154 Curran Hall and 954 Lawrence East Express (which predominantly serves the area), 102 Markham Road, 902 Markham Road Express, 9 Bellamy, and the 16 McCowan, (the latter four connect to Warden station). The area is also served by three bus routes on Ellesmere Road, which are 95 York Mills, 38 Highland Creek, and the 133 Neilson (the latter two serve the Scarborough Centre station). The area is also served by Highway 401 which runs through the Greater Toronto Area from east-to-west.
