= Military Trail =

Military Trail may refer to:

- Florida State Road 809 in Florida, United States
- Military Trail, a road in Toronto, Ontario, Canada once part of Danforth Avenue dates back to 1799.
