= Woodbine Building Supply fire =

2001 arson in Toronto, Ontario, Canada

Coordinates: 43.6853°N 79.3134°W

On December 24, 2001, arsonists set fire to the Woodbine Building Supply Company building in Toronto, Ontario, Canada, causing an explosion and leading to one of the largest fires in the city's history. The arsonists were conspiring with John Magno, co-owner of the store, who desired to destroy the struggling business to collect a fraudulent insurance claim and clear the site for construction of a condominium development. The fire led to the evacuation of over 50 homes on Christmas morning, and the death of one of the arsonists. After many years of sitting as an idle lot, it was replaced by a condo building, Carmelina Condominiums, completed in 2015.

== Background ==
Woodbine Building Supply was a hardware store on Toronto's east-end Danforth Avenue owned by Magno with his two brothers, Frank and Carlo, and started by their father years before. For several years the company had struggled to compete with a nearby Home Depot, and its owners had frequent disputes with local residents; it had been fined $11,800 for improper storage of materials. The brothers planned to move their store to a new location nearby, and construct a condominium development on the Danforth site. Weeks before the fire, the Magno brothers increased their insurance coverage on the store. A local demolition company quoted $145,000 to demolish the store and clear the lot, which was rejected by Woodbine Building Supply's owners.

== Fire and explosion ==
Late on December 24, 2001, four men arrived at the store and began loading its contents into two vans. They chose Christmas Eve to start the fire because they believed Italians and Greeks living in the area would largely be in church for midnight mass. At one point one of the men dropped a cash register in the parking lot, the noise attracting the attention of neighbours; Jason Regaldo then left in one of the vans.

At 12:34 a.m. on December 25, the building was destroyed by a massive explosion; debris was found embedded in cars across the street. Investigators believe that the inexperienced arsonists failed to start a fire on their first try, and on trying again accidentally ignited flammable vapours which had built up in the building's basement. Sam Paskalis was badly burned, and spent several months in hospital in a coma; he was badly disfigured. The body of Tony Jarcevic, 22, was discovered two weeks later. The fire which followed was one of the largest in Toronto's history. Families in fifty nearby homes were evacuated and sheltered in buses, and 171 firefighters needed two days to bring the fire under control. The fire caused $4 million in damage and closed Danforth Avenue for several days.

== Perpetrators ==
=== John Magno ===
John Magno was the President of Woodbine Building Supply, which he co-owned with his brothers Frank and Carlo. John and the store were known for frequent disputes with nearby residents. After the store was destroyed by fire, Magno filed an insurance claim worth $3.5 million. Investigators suspected arson, and based on testimony by Paskalis, Magno and Roks were charged with second-degree murder under section 229(c) of the Criminal Code, a rarely used section under which a person is charged for taking "flagrant risks with human life in order to achieve some further unlawful purpose." Magno denied his involvement in the scheme. He was found not guilty of second-degree murder but guilty of manslaughter and three counts of arson and sentenced to 12 years in prison. Magno vowed to appeal his conviction and was released on bail; however, his appeal was dismissed in July 2015.

=== Adrian Roks ===
Adrian Roks, Jr., was a Toronto businessman who owned two tanning salons with his wife, and had no criminal record prior to the fire. Roks was with Magno's family on Christmas Eve when the fire was set, however investigators suspected Roks' involvement due to his relationship with the others accused. After Paskalis admitted his own involvement in the scheme, Roks was charged with second-degree murder under section 229(c) of the Criminal Code, as was Magno. Police offered to drop the charge against Roks if he agreed to give a "truthful statement" about the insurance fraud conspiracy; however, the offer was rescinded when police felt Roks was not telling everything he knew. On June 11, 2007, Roks was sentenced to life imprisonment.

=== Sam Paskalis ===
John "Sam" Paskalis had a history of being a con artist, and one of his schemes involved people applying for a loan through a fake company and paying the insurance fees up front but never getting the loan. Paskalis also used stolen credit card numbers, some of them taken from unsuspecting customers at Woodbine, to order merchandise. He was supposed to get C$50,000, part ownership of a nightclub and a cut-rate condo for his role in the scheme. Paskalis had organized the theft of $1 million in store inventory before setting it on fire to cover his tracks. On the night of the fire, he was caught in the explosion and severely burned, spending several months in a coma. In March 2005, he admitted his involvement in the scheme, and in a plea bargain pleaded guilty to manslaughter and arson in exchange for the Crown dropping second-degree murder charges. He received a time served sentence of five years, spending more than two years in jail.

=== Tony Jarcevic ===
Tony Jarcevic, aged 22 at the time, was taking a fire prevention course at a local community college and was hired to set the fire. According to Paskalis, the two men were spreading gasoline and fertilizer in the basement of Woodbine Building Supply when Paskalis decided to leave because of the fumes. Jarcevic called him back just before the explosion which destroyed the building. Paskalis escaped; Jarcevic's badly burned body was not discovered until 17 days later.

=== Shaun McMaster ===
Shaun McMaster helped the arsonists move merchandise from the store on the evening of the fire, and waited in a van while Paskalis and Jarcevic set the fire. After the explosion, McMaster tried unsuccessfully to contact the other trapped arsonists, then fled the scene. On January 3, 2008, he pleaded guilty to manslaughter and was given a time served sentence of 6½ years in prison.

=== Jason Regaldo ===
Jason Regaldo was a friend of Jarcevic, McMaster and Paskalis who agreed to store merchandise from Woodbine Building Supply which the arsonists removed as payment for setting the fire. On the night of the fire, Regaldo helped others remove merchandise from the store but fled after a cash register was dropped in the parking lot, attracting attention from neighbours. Later, fearing that Magno would sue for the damage done to the store, police convinced Regaldo to admit his involvement and testify against Magno. Regaldo was convicted of conspiracy to commit arson and given a suspended sentence.

=== Others ===
According to Paskalis, the arsonists were tipped off to the police investigation by an Ontario Provincial Police informant. Paskalis testified that Frank Magno, an OPP auxiliary sergeant and John Magno's brother, was contacted by "friends" in the OPP who advised him on homicide investigations, and Frank told the arsonists to "be careful." Frank Magno was not charged in the arson.

== Aftermath ==
The lot formerly occupied by Woodbine Building Supply is the site of Carmelina Condominiums, a 12-storey condo building with 148 residential units and street-level retail. Carmelina is owned by JFC Properties, a company run by John, Frank and Carlo Magno. The tower is much larger than the surrounding two-storey retail buildings on Danforth Avenue, and taller than the recommendations in Toronto's Official Plan. While many residents initially welcomed the development of the empty lot which had been idle since the explosion, construction caused damage to surrounding properties which once again led to disputes with neighbours. Construction was completed and Carmelina Condominiums opened in 2015.
