= Highland Creek (Toronto) =

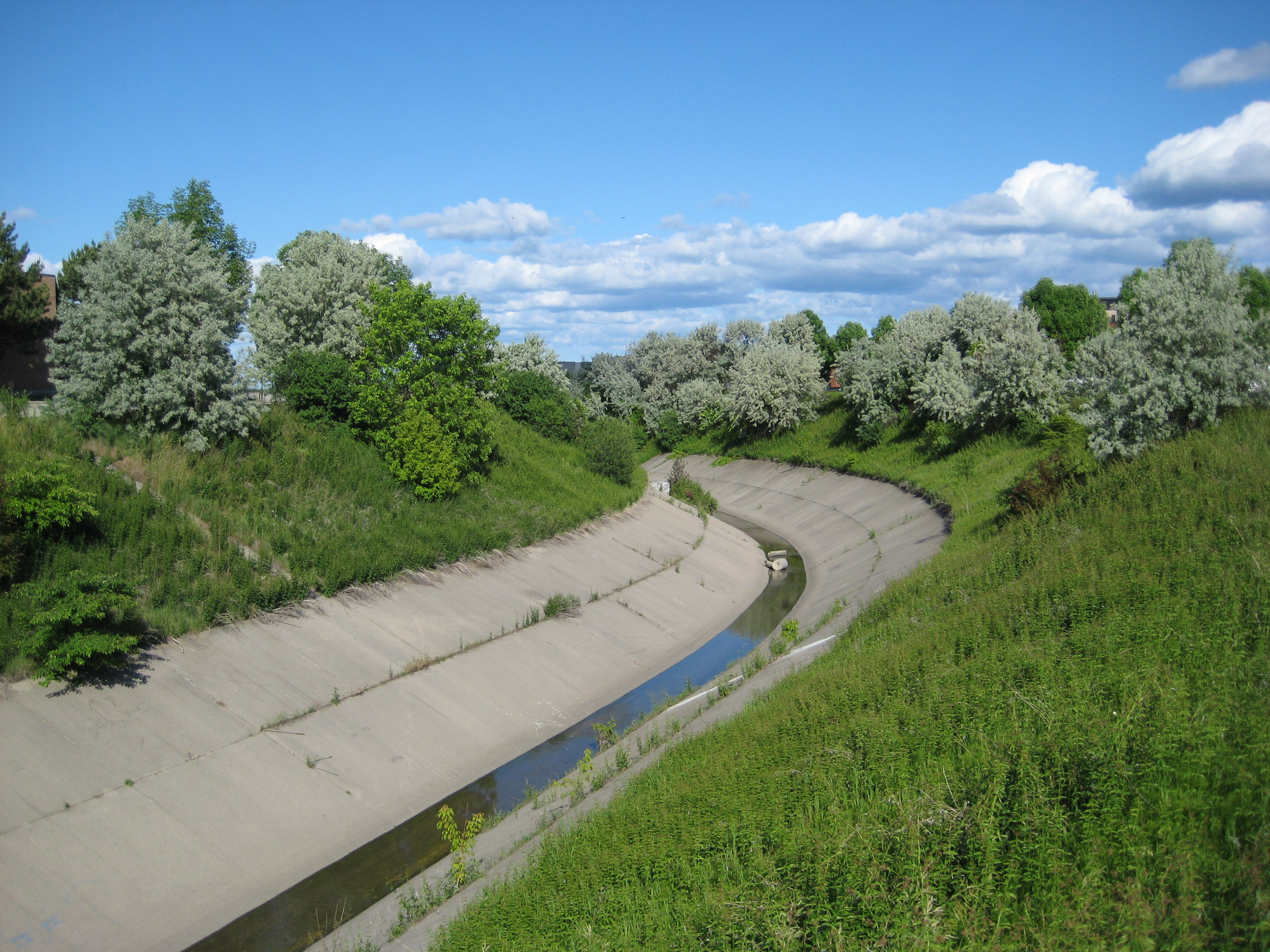

- Location of the mouth of the creek in Toronto

Location
- Country: Canada
- Province: Ontario
- Municipality: Toronto

Physical characteristics
- Source: Hydro One right of way, near Brimley Road & McNicoll Avenue
  - coordinates: 43°48′54″N 79°16′51″W
  - elevation: 186 m (610 ft)
- Mouth: Lake Ontario
  - coordinates: 43°46′0″N 79°08′41″W
  - elevation: 75 m (246 ft)
- Length: 29.1 km (18.1 mi)

Basin features
- Tributaries
  - right: West Highland Creek

Highland Creek is a river in the Scarborough district of Toronto, Ontario, emptying into Lake Ontario at the eastern end of the Scarborough Bluffs. It is home to several species of fish including trout, carp, bass and salmon. It is a meandering river which, like most rivers in Toronto (including the Don and Humber), travels through a glacial ravine formed after the last Ice Age. The Highland Creek watershed, including tributaries, is almost entirely contained within Scarborough.

== Naming ==
According to a 1796 list of Mississauga names of rivers and creeks compiled by British surveyor Augustus Jones, the river was known as Yat-qui-i-be-no-nick, which translates as "creek comes out under high." There is no documented source for the name "Highland Creek", but some suggest it is of descriptive origins, possibly recalling the Highlands of Scotland where many early settlers of the area came from.

== Hydrology ==
Highland Creek consists of four branches, treated here in order from west to east. The names used for the branches indicate only geographic position, and should not be taken as proper names.

The north-west branch begins at the exit of a culvert at Finch Avenue East at 43°48′11″N 79°17′17″W. It flows south, then south-east and passes under the intersection of Midland Avenue and Huntingwood Drive. The branch continues east under Brimley Road, then parallels the road south until just north of the Canadian Pacific Railway tracks. The branch then heads under the tracks east and under McCowan Road, before joining the west branch at 43°47′30.5″N 79°15′33″W. The entire length of the branch is artificially channelled and straightened, and much of it lined with a concrete bed. This was done in the 1970s after a scare about mosquitoes carrying encephalitis breeding in stagnant creek water (see also "Threats from Development" below). The total length is approximately 3.4 km (2.1 mi).

The west branch begins at the exit of a culvert just southeast of Brimley Road and McNicoll Road at 43°48′54″N 79°16′51″W. This is the most northerly point of any part of the Highland Creek system including all tributaries. It flows south-east under Finch Avenue East, McCowan Road and Middlefield Road. The branch travels 250 m (820 ft) southwest, then south to its confluence with the north-west branch. It continues southeast under Sheppard Avenue East, then south under Highway 401, and then a further 150 m (492 ft) south. The entire length up to this point has been artificially channelled, straightened and lined with a concrete bed. The next 1.6 km (1.0 mi) stretch, however, a crescent shape that proceeds east to a point just west of Markham Road and which had been previously altered, has now been restored to a more natural state with gentle meanders and shallow pools. From Markham Road, the branch flows east in a natural course and ravine through Woburn Park until it meets the central branch at 43°47′08″N 79°13′23″W. The total length is approximately 7.7 km (4.8 mi).

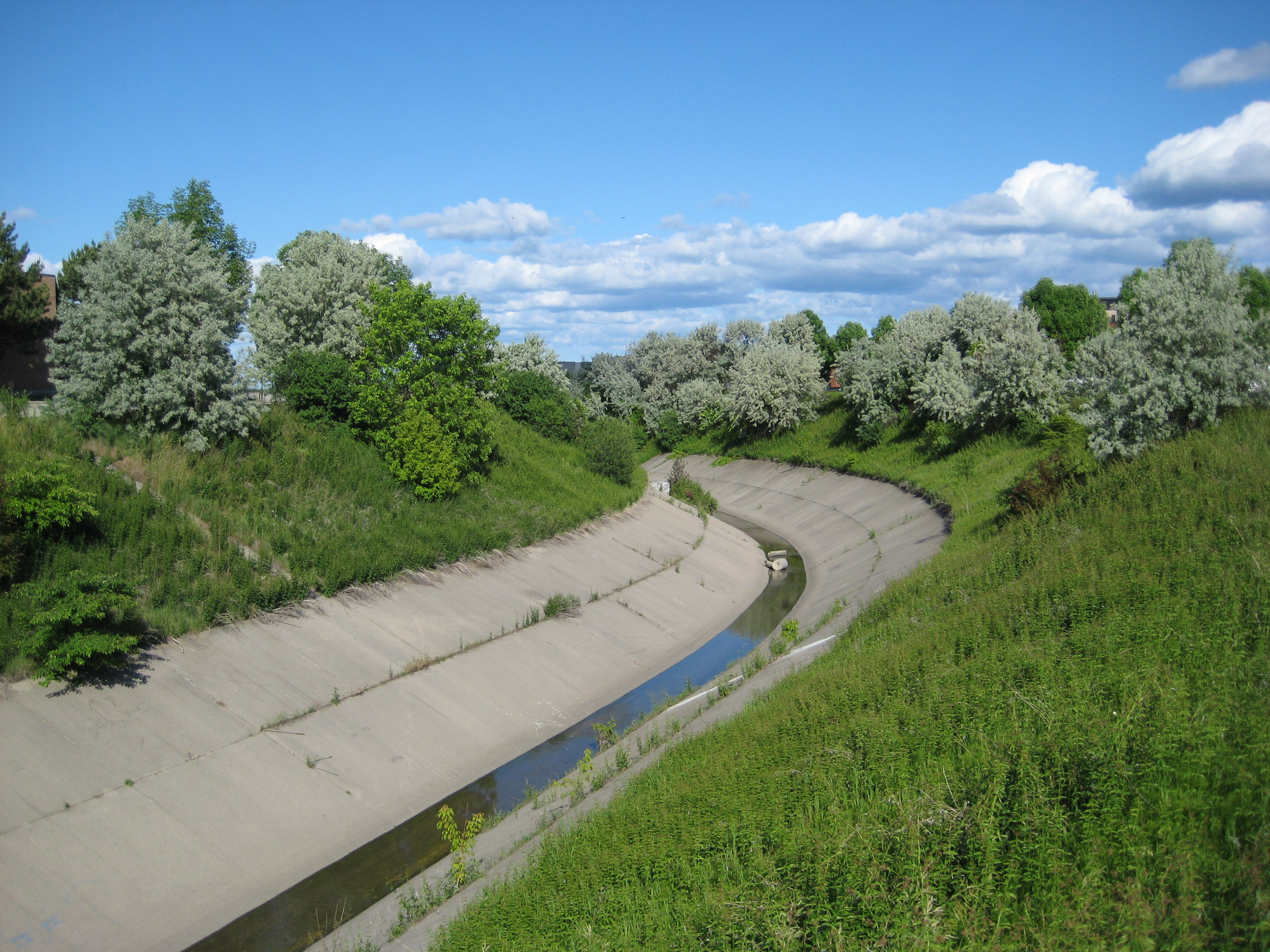
The central branch at Middlefield Road, near its point of origin.

The central branch begins at the exit of a culvert north-west of Middlefield Road and Finch Avenue East at 43°48′49″N 79°15′40″W. The branch flows south east, then east under Middlefield to 43°48′49.5″N 79°14′55.5″W where a short 900 m (2,953 ft) tributary branch running south joins it. It then flows south-east under the Canadian Pacific Railway tracks, Finch Avenue and Markham Road, then south-east under Highway 401. From this point on, it flows in a natural bed and ravine. It then travels 500 m (1,640 ft) to the confluence with the west branch. The branch then travels south-east under Military Trail, the first crossing point north of Lake Ontario built in the early settlement period, and Ellesmere Road. South of Ellesmere, the branch enters Morningside Park (Toronto), where the tributary West Highland Creek joins at 43°46′27″N 79°11′57″W. It travels east through the park, under Morningside Avenue and past some of the outdoor sports facilities and the Miller Lash House of the University of Toronto Scarborough. It continues south-east under Old Kingston Road, Kingston Road and Lawrence Avenue East and through Colonel Danforth Park to meet with the east branch, before flowing into Lake Ontario at 43°46′0″N 79°08′41″W. The total length is approximately 13.5 km (8.4 mi).

The east branch rises immediately south of Highway 401, west of Meadowvale Road at 43°47′56″N 79°10′22″W. It travels south south-east to Ellesmere Road, before entering a culvert. The branch then emerges east of Meadowvale Road south of Ellesmere, before heading south-west under Kingston Road and Highway 2A. After a further 800 m (2,625 ft), it turns south and is joined by a small stream just before Lawrence Avenue East. It passes under the road and continues south until it joins the central branch just north of Lake Ontario. The total length is approximately 4.5 km (2.8 mi). Unlike the other parts of the creek system, this branch does not flow through any deep ravines.

=== Highland Creek Wetland Complex ===
At the mouth of the Creek are four wetlands totaling 7.6 hectares (19 acres) in size. The Stephenson’s Swamp is both a designated Environmental Significant Area and a Provincially Significant Wetland. According to the Toronto and Region Conservation Authority, the type of forest swamp used to be the most common type of wetland on Lake Ontario prior to European settlement but are now rare. It is a breeding area for several uncommon species, including the blue-gray gnatcatcher and the yellow-spotted salamander. There are three other designated Environmental Significant Areas in the Highland Creek watershed: Highland Forest, Hague Park and the Morningside Park Forest.

=== Tributaries ===
- West Highland Creek
  - Bellamy Ravine Creek
  - Southwest Highland Creek

== Threats from development ==
Due to development in Scarborough, which has substantially increased the amount of water that historically travelled through the river, there are a number of artificial diversions (use of control channels) to decrease erosion and guide the river past obstacles. For example, there are a large number of areas where the river is lined with rock cages. There are small dams to even out the flow in areas where upstream storage reservoirs are possible, increasing its depth. The river travels through culverts under some major streets. In addition, many of the city's storm sewers drain into the river. The valley of Highland Creek contains a number of interconnected parks which have a system of paved bike and walking paths. As a result of these numerous channel modification projects, mostly implemented in the 1960s and 1970s, much of the creek does not follow its natural path. This is in contrast to the nearby Rouge River, which has fewer in-stream barriers and extensive riparian and floodplain vegetation, and where a wider variety of wildlife, including some climax forest species, can be found.

== History ==
Like many creeks and river valleys in Toronto, evidence of First Nations occupation has been found in this area. A 2005 excavation by the Toronto and Region Conservation Authority near the mouth of Highland Creek found evidence of a Late Woodland or Early Archaic site, thought to have been a place of tool manufacture. The Helliwell family, one of the first settlers in the area, accumulated a large number of artifacts from the last 5,000 years.

Highland Creek historically formed a natural barrier to transportation in the eastern part of Scarborough, with the single exception of Military Trail, blocking the eastern sections of Lawrence Avenue East (at two locations), Morningside Avenue, and Kingston Road until the construction of longer-span bridges beginning in 1937 (Kingston Road) and continuing through the mid-1960s (Lawrence Avenue East, Ellesmere Road). Although the creek itself is rarely more than 20 m (66 ft) wide, the ravine it runs through commonly is over 100 m (328 ft) wide and 30 m (98 ft) deep. During the early part of the 20th century, it also blocked the progression of the Toronto and Scarboro' Electric Railway, Light and Power Company line along Kingston Road, which was unable to negotiate the grade into the creek where it met Kingston Road.

During the late 1940s and early 1950s, a new town plan developed in the valley between Kingston Road and the eastern crossing of Lawrence Avenue. The primary road remains as the park access road to Colonel Danforth Park, but the remainder, with few exceptions, was washed out during Hurricane Hazel in October 1954.

== Communities along the creek ==
Highland Creek is also the name of a neighbourhood on the east side of the creek at Old Kingston Road. Opposite the former village of Highland Creek is West Hill, named for its position on the tablelands above the valley.

== See also ==
- List of rivers of Ontario
