= Lawrence Manor =

Coordinates: 43.725°N 79.437°W

- Neighbourhood
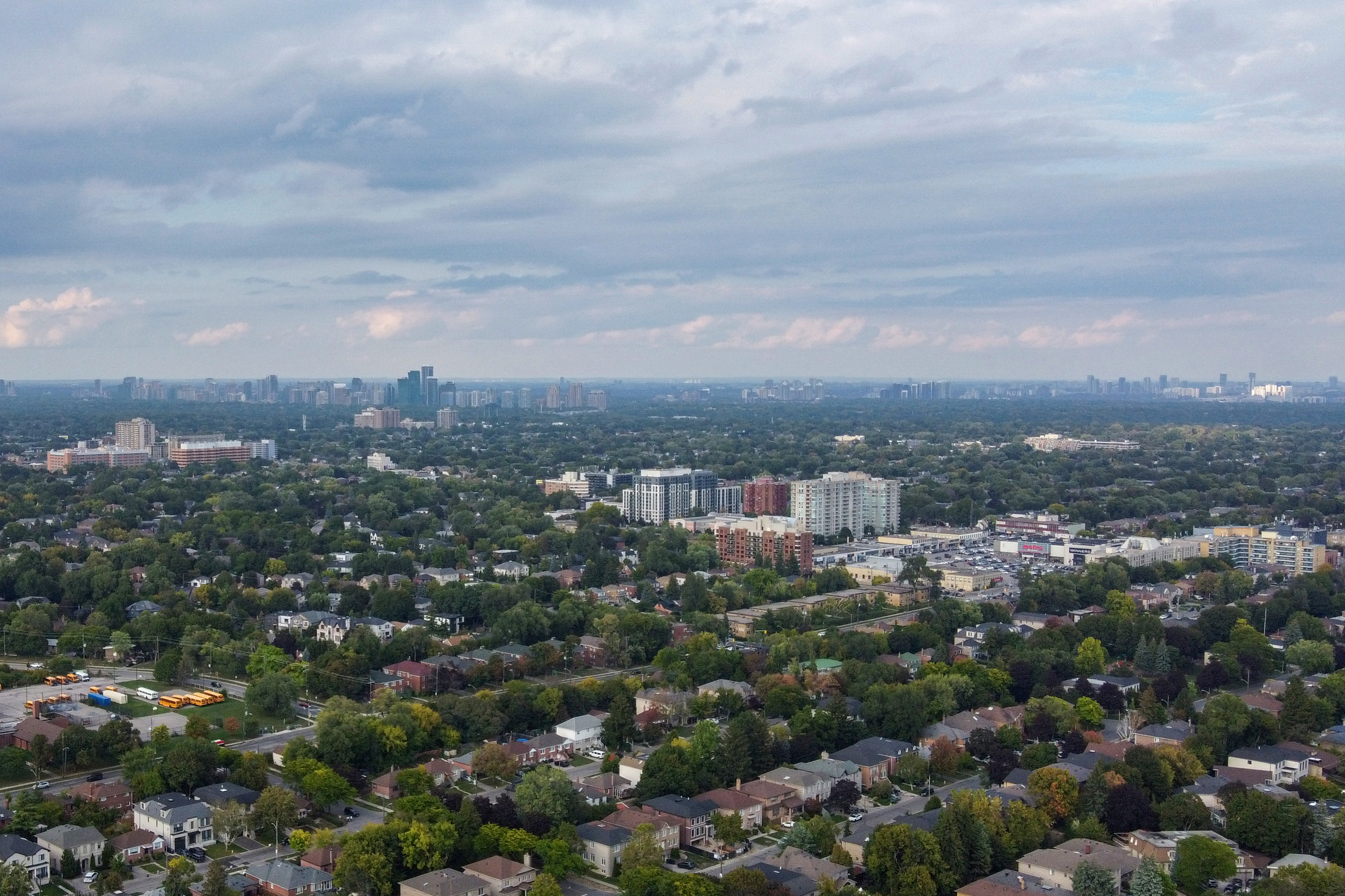
- Aerial view of Lawrence Manor in 2025

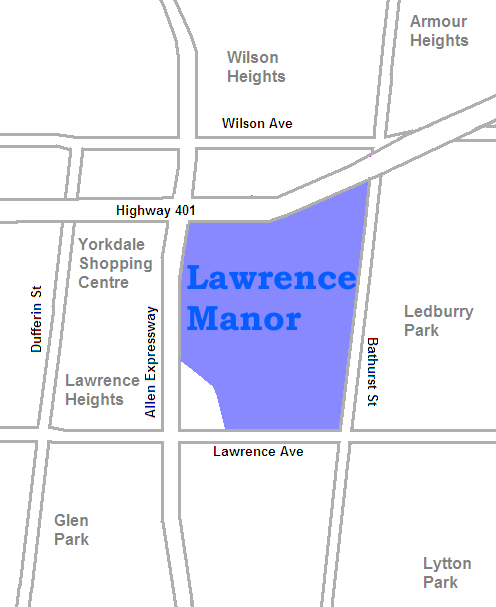
- Country: Canada
- Province: Ontario
- City: Toronto
- Municipality established: 1850 York Township
- Changed municipality: 1922 North York from York Township
- Changed municipality: 1998 Toronto from North York

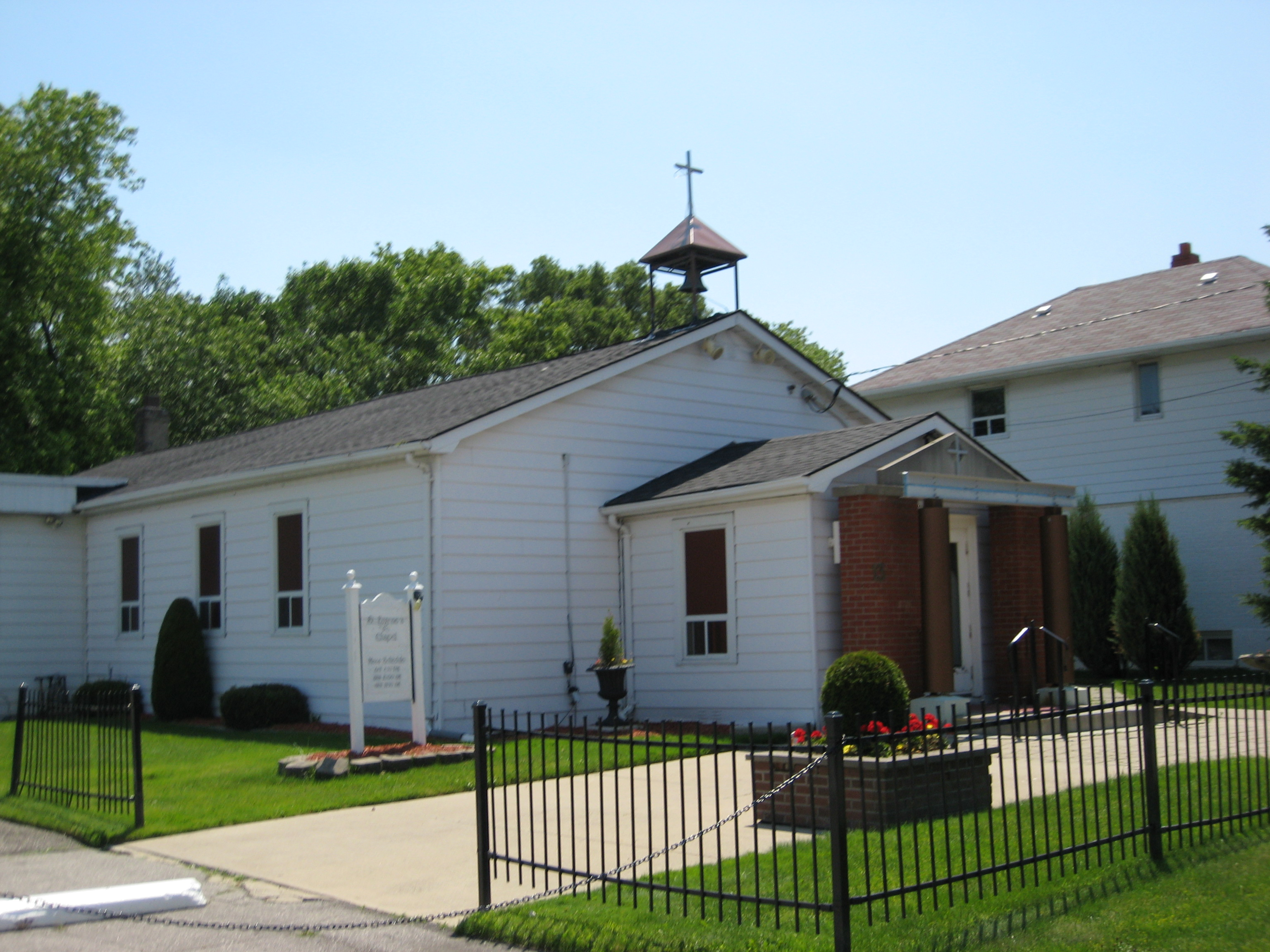
St. Eugene Roman Catholic Chapel is a Roman Catholic church in Lawrence Manor

Lawrence Manor is a neighbourhood in the city of Toronto, Ontario, Canada. This neighbourhood is bounded by Bathurst Street on the east, Highway 401 to the north, the Allen to the west, and Lawrence Avenue to the south. The western side of the area borders along Bathurst Heights and the large public housing project.

Retail stores line much of the area on the west side of Bathurst Street south of Highway 401 to just north of Lawrence Avenue West. Lawrence Plaza at Bathurst and Lawrence caters to the area and opened in 1953. On the side streets west of Bathurst is mainly residential single homes and low rise apartments. The area east of Bathurst to Yonge are home to the more wealthier part of Lawrence Manor. The area was developed by the Canada Mortgage and Housing Corporation in the 1940s. Baycrest Hospital is located within Lawrence Manor.

== Demographics ==
Lawrence Manor is home to a large population of Orthodox Jews, as well as a large Filipino population. About 62% of residents in the northern half of Lawrence Manor identify as being first generation residents, according to the 2011 Census. This is notably higher than the number of first generation residents in Ontario (~30%) and Canada as a whole (~22%) reported in 2011.

The community is home to a number of Orthodox Jewish organizations and religious centres.

== Education ==
Two public school boards operate schools in Lawrence Manor, the separate Toronto Catholic District School Board (TCDSB), and the secular Toronto District School Board (TDSB).

Both TCDSB, and TDSB operate public elementary schools in the neighbourhood. TCDSB operates St. Margaret Catholic School, whereas TDSB operates Baycrest Public School. The latter school and land was sold to the TCDSB in 2019 and the old school was approved for demolition in late 2024. A new as yet unnamed 2 story Catholic school is expected to open on the site by September 2028. Baycrest students (kindergarten to grade 8) now attend classes along with St Margaret's middle school students (Grades 5-8) in the nearby former Sir Sandford Fleming Academy (High School) campus at 50 Ameer Avenue. TCDSB is the only public school board to operate a secondary school in Lawrence Manor, Dante Alighieri Academy. Both TCDSB institutions operate a satellite campus for the school in the neighbourhood, known as Beatrice Campus.

TDSB does not operate a secondary school in the neighbourhood, with TDSB secondary school students residing in Lawrence Manor attending institutions in adjacent neighbourhoods. The French first language public secular school board, Conseil scolaire Viamonde, and it separate counterpart, Conseil scolaire catholique MonAvenir also offer schooling to applicable residents of Lawrence Manor, although they do not operate a school in the neighbourhood. CSCM and CSV students attend schools situated in other neighbourhoods in Toronto.

== Politics ==
At the federal and provincial level the area is within the riding of Eglinton—Lawrence (formerly in the federal riding of Eglinton and provincially within Oakwood). The current MP and MPP are Liberal Marco Mendicino and Conservative Robin Martin respectively. At Toronto City Council it is represented by Ward 8 councillor Mike Colle.

During the period of Metro Toronto, the area was under the Metro Ward of North York Centre South.

== Recreation ==
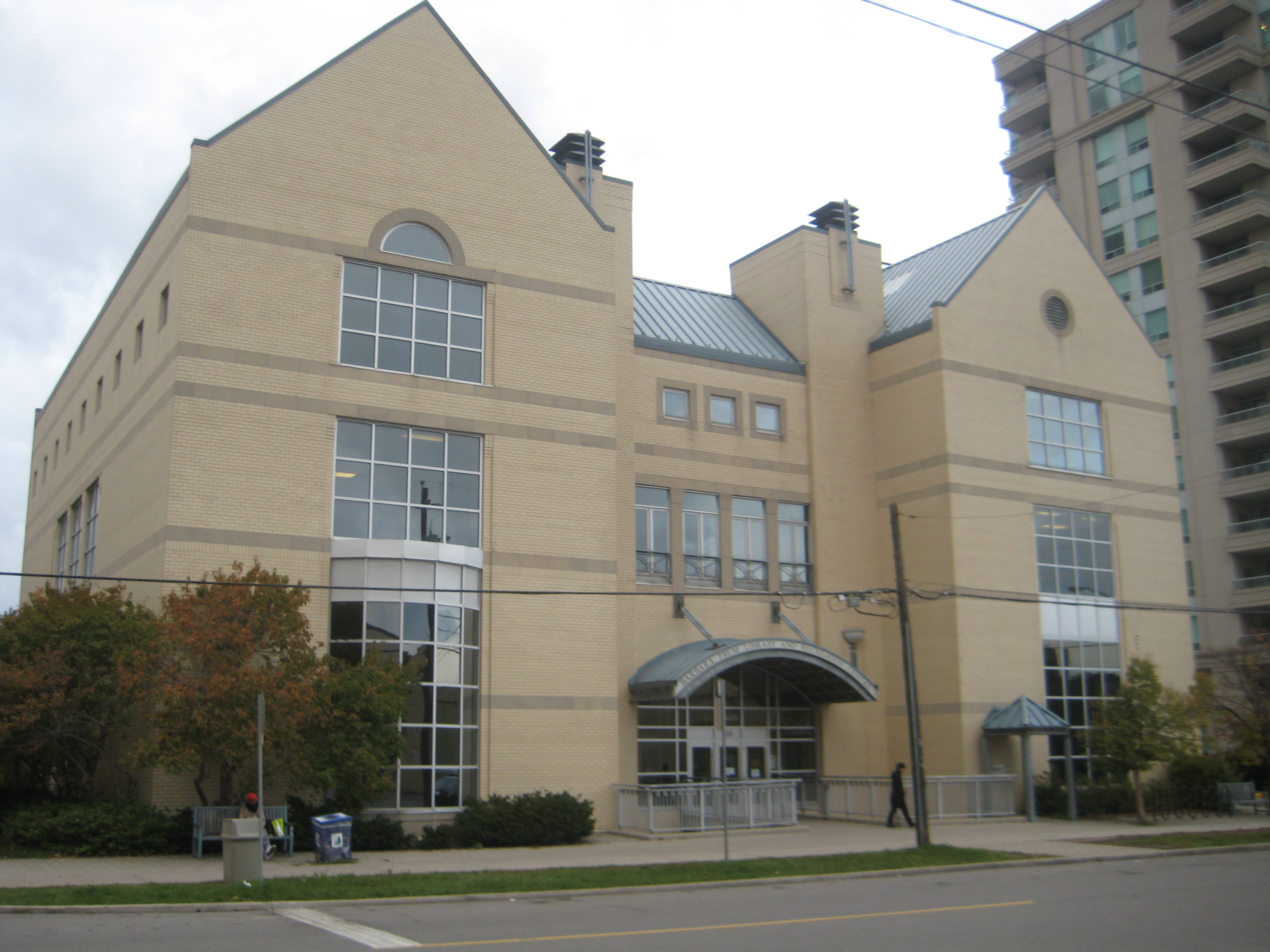
The Barbara Frum Library and Recreation Centre is situated in Lawrence Manor.

Lawrence Manor is home to several municipal parks, including Elijah Park, and Prince of Wales Park. Municipal parks in Lawrence Manor are managed by the Toronto Parks, Forestry and Recreation Division. The division also manages the community centre at the Barbara Frum Library and Recreation Centre. The building is used as a community centre, as well as a branch of the Toronto Public Library.

== Transportation ==
Several major roadways serve as the neighbourhood's boundaries, with Bathurst Street to the east, Lawrence Avenue to the south, and Highway 401 to the north. Highway 401 is a major east–west controlled access highway. Portions of another controlled access highway, Allen Road, also bounds the neighbourhood to the northwest.

Public transportation in the neighbourhood is provided by the Toronto Transit Commission (TTC). The TTC operates several bus routes through Lawrence Manor including 7 Bathurst and 52 Lawrence. The Toronto subway stop, Yorkdale station, is situated west of the neighbourhood.
