= McCowan Road =

Road in Ontario, Canada

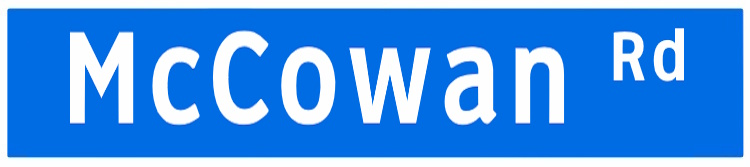
- York Regional Road 67
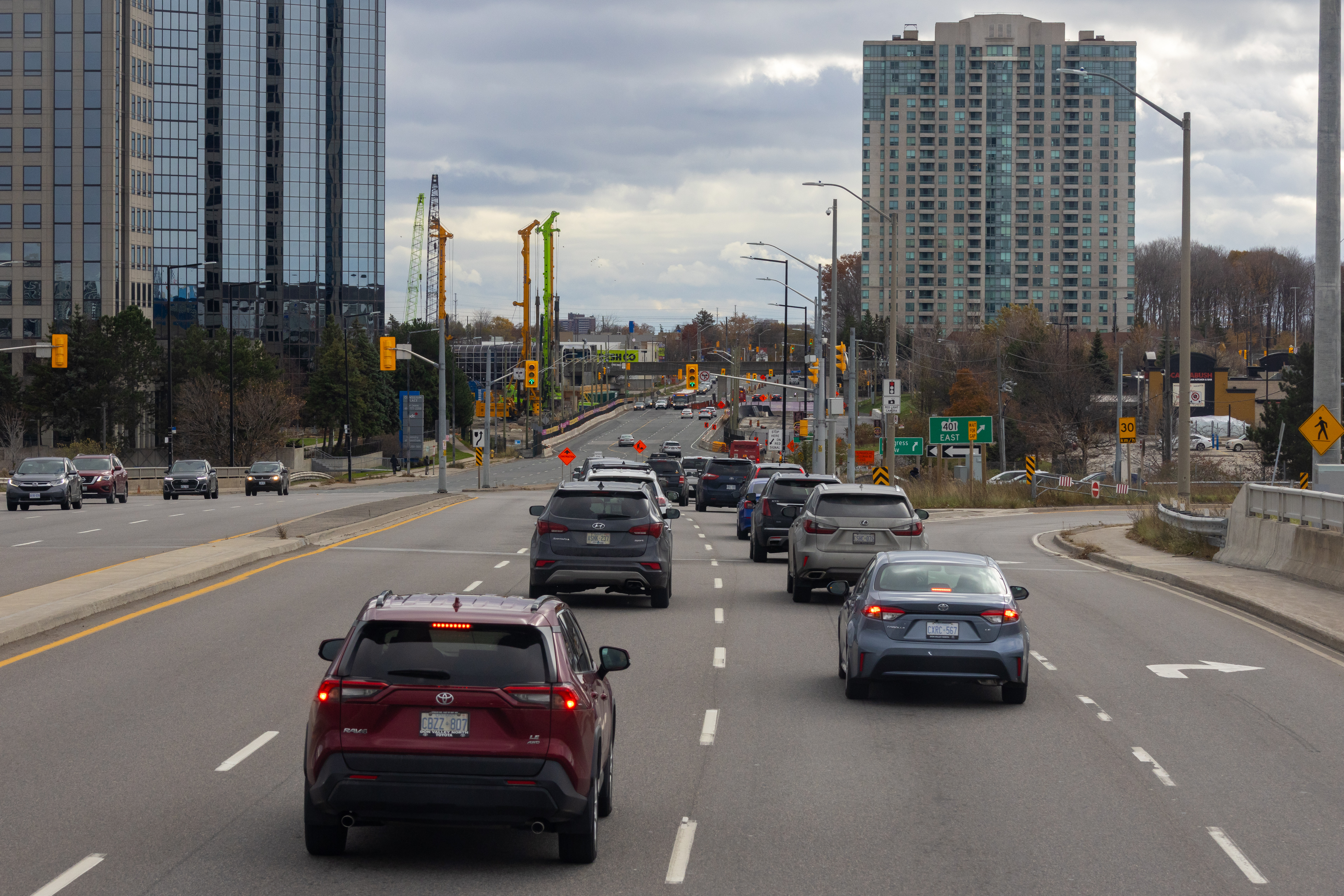
- McCowan Road in Toronto, with the Scarborough Subway Extension under construction in the distance in November 2025

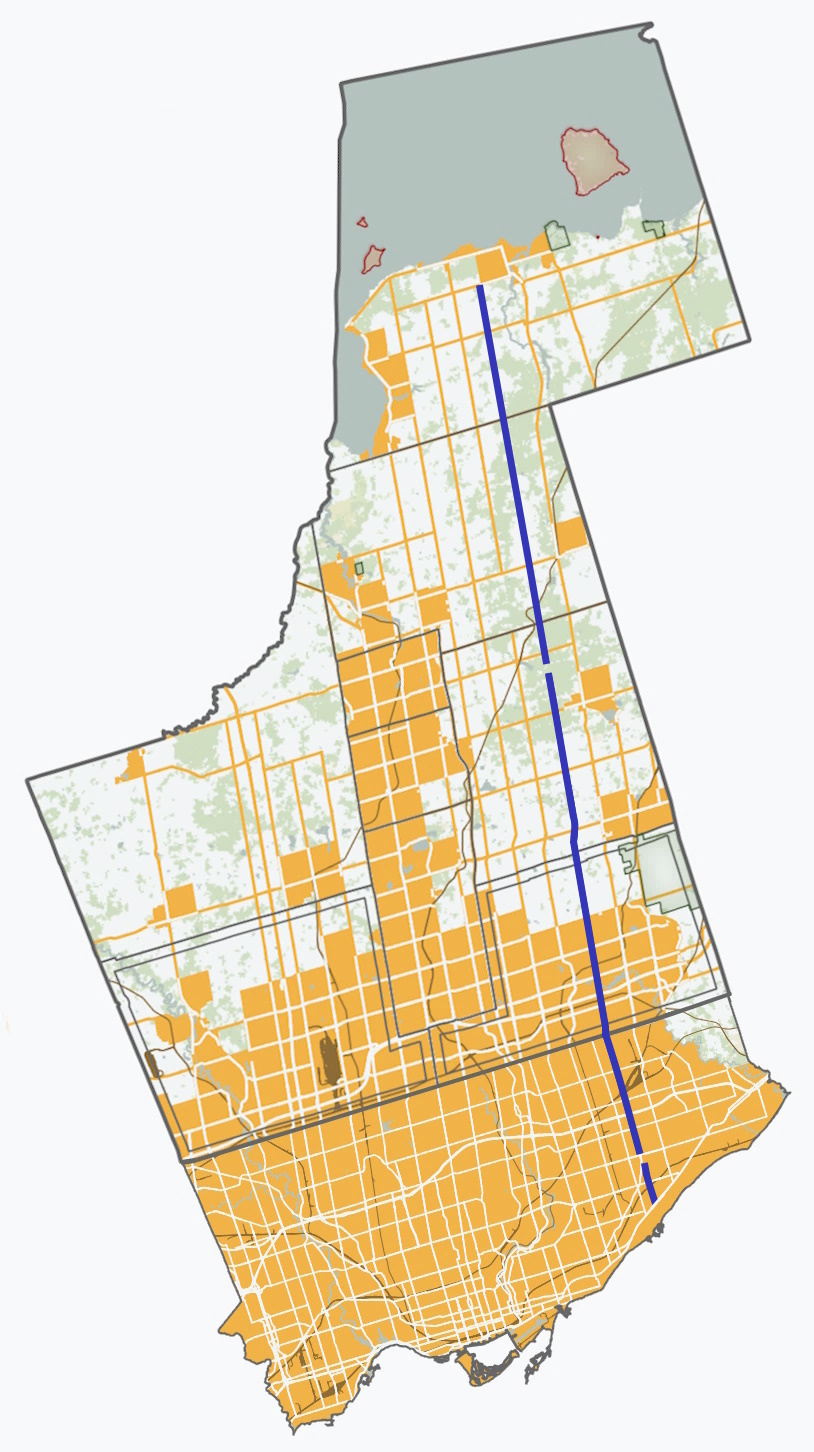
- Route of McCowan Road through Toronto and York Region (blue line)
- Namesake: McCowan Family
- Maintained by: City of Toronto; Region of York
- Length: 64.3 km (40.0 mi) (combined lengths of 4 sections)
- Location: Toronto; Markham; Whitchurch-Stouffville; East Gwillimbury; Georgina
- South end: Kingston Road; In Toronto (continues as Cathedral Bluffs Drive)
- Major junctions: Eglinton Avenue —Road Breaks (2X)— Danforth Road (continuation of); Lawrence Avenue; Ellesmere Road; Highway 401; Sheppard Avenue; Finch Avenue; Steeles Avenue; 14th Avenue; 407 ETR; Highway 7 Major Mackenzie Drive; 16th Avenue; Elgin Mills Road; Stouffville Road; Bloomington Road; Aurora Road; St. John’s Sideroad ——Road Breaks—— Davis Drive; Mount Albert Road; Queensville Sideroad; Ravenshoe Road
- North end: Baseline Road in Georgina

Other
Nearby arterial roads
← Kennedy Road	Markham Road; Main Street Markham; Highway 48 →

McCowan Road is a major north–south thoroughfare in the Greater Toronto Area in Ontario, Canada. It runs through the city of Toronto and into the Regional Municipality of York where it ends at the Town of Georgina.

The road was named for the McCowan Family, a Scottish family patriarch who settled in the area in 1833. The street, the former Lot 22, and later McCowan's Sideroad (officially named McCowan Road by Scarborough Township in 1956), begins at Kingston Road in the City of Toronto and ends at Baseline Road in the Town of Georgina.

In Scarborough, there is a brief break at the Highland Creek between Lawrence and Eglinton Avenues; Danforth Road carries most of the traffic south-southwest of Lawrence. When the Scarborough Town Centre complex opened in 1973, an interchange with Highway 401 was opened. With greater vehicle usage, in that area, the road is now six lanes from Ellesmere Road to Sheppard Avenue, and additional exit ramps to/from the 401 have been constructed at nearby Brimley Road.

== Route description ==
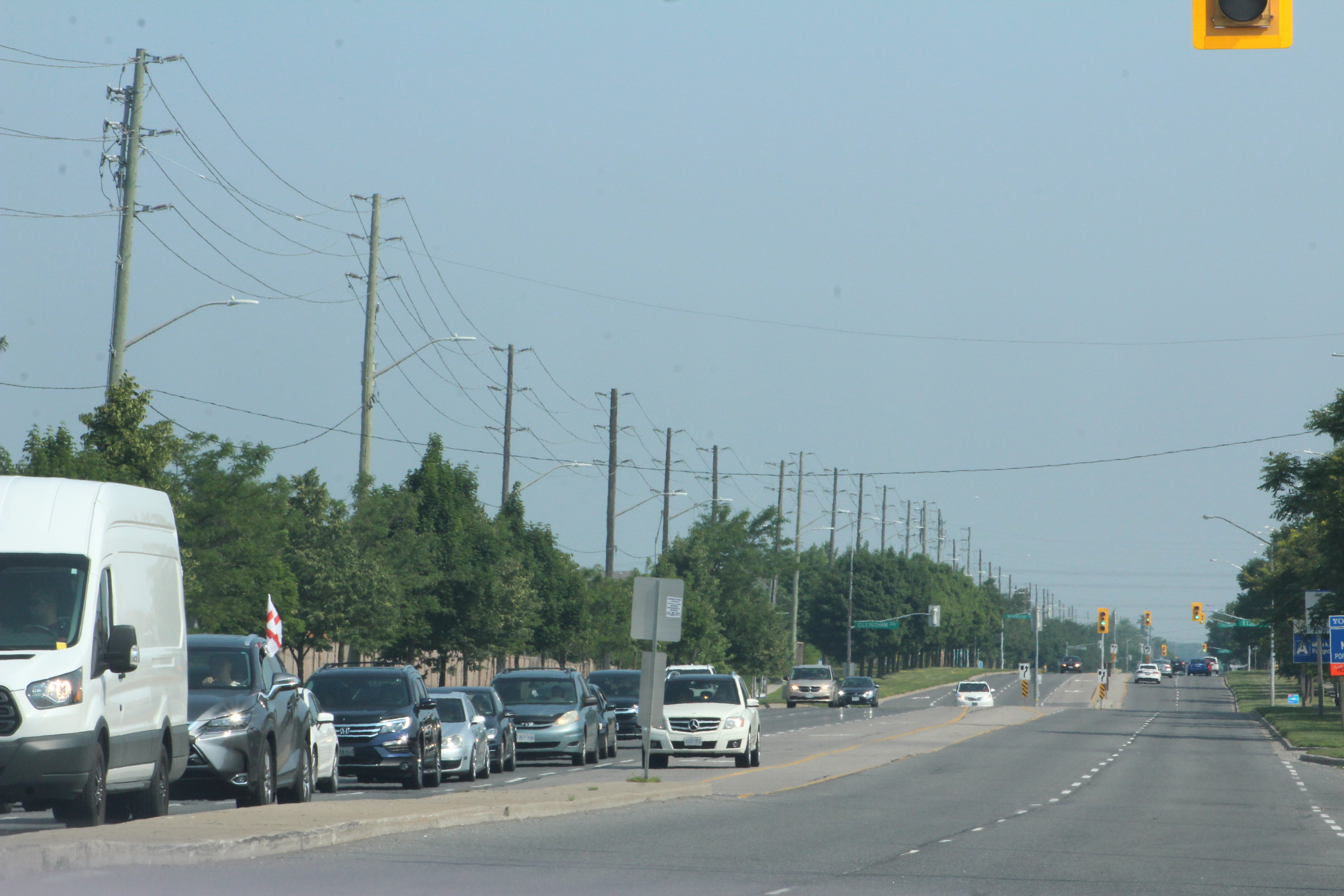
McCowan Road within Markham, looking north from Steeles Avenue

McCowan Road runs from Kingston Road north to Steeles Avenue, where it becomes York Regional Road 67 in York Region. It is interrupted by a brief 375-meter gap north of Eglinton Avenue due to Highland Creek, where McCowan Park and John McCrae Public School are located. During this break, Danforth Road carries through traffic for approximately 1.75 kilometers. Formerly known as 7th Line in Markham, McCowan Road interchanges with Highway 401 at the Scarborough Town Centre within the Scarborough City Centre district. North of Sheppard Avenue, the road borders the western edge of the Canadian Pacific Railway Toronto marshalling yards, which extends to the east of Markham Road.

== Public transit ==
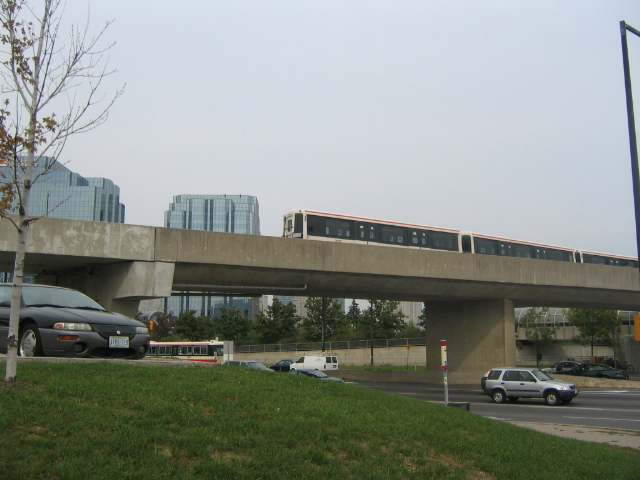
A train on the elevated guideway over McCowan Road on the decommissioned Line 3 Scarborough in 2005

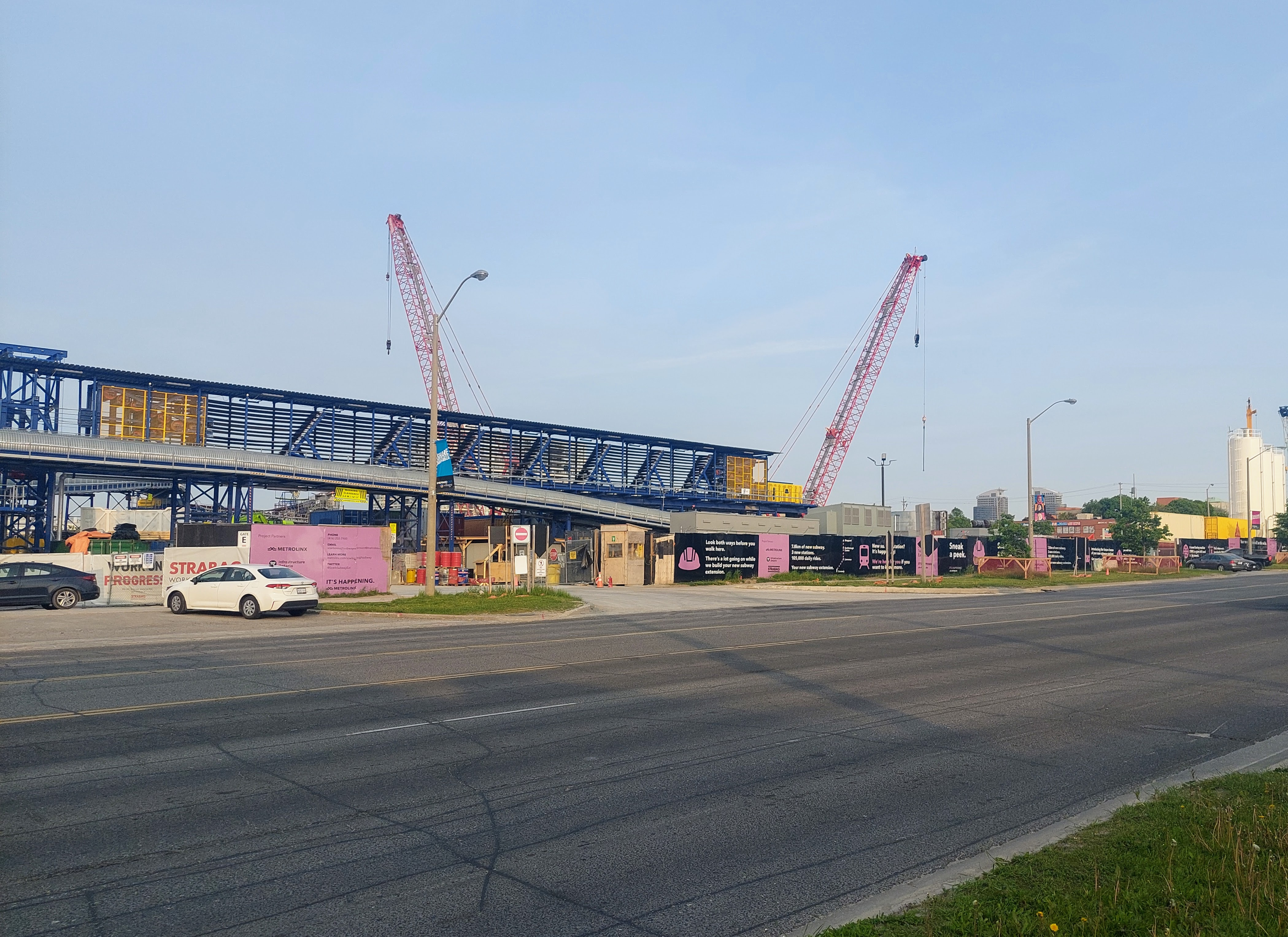
Sheppard/McCowan station under construction on the Scarborough subway extension in 2023

McCowan Road is served mainly by the Toronto Transit Commission (TTC) Route 16 McCowan bus south of Scarborough Centre station, a station on the closed Line 3 Scarborough (more information in the section below), whose bus terminal is still in use, and the Route 129 McCowan North bus north of it. Route 129's 'A' branch also serves McCowan Road in Markham north of Steeles Avenue, which formerly required all passengers to pay a second fare when crossing Steeles Avenue. Since the implementation of the One Fare program on February 26, 2024, riders paying by Presto card, credit card, or debit card only need to pay once but still need to tap off if crossing the municipal boundary at Steeles Avenue to validate their transfer. Another route serving part McCowan is Route 53B Steeles East.

York Region Transit (YRT) formerly operated the Viva Green line of that system's Viva Rapid Transit network until that service was initially temporarily suspended in 2020 due to the COVID-19 pandemic and discontinued permanently in 2023. Present regular YRT routes using portions of McCowan Road are Routes 40 (Unionville Local), Route 41 (Markham Local), Route 42 (Berczy South Unionville), Route 45 (Mingay), and Route 522 (Markham Community Bus).

=== Former and future rapid transit ===
Between 1985 and 2023, the TTC operated Line 3 Scarborough, a light metro line originally named the Scarborough RT, which terminated at McCowan station. The line used specialized technology that was aging and becoming difficult to maintain, and was slated to be decommissioned upon the opening of an extension of the conventional Line 2 Bloor-Danforth, which began construction from Kennedy station north to the intersection of McCowan Road and Sheppard Avenue in June 2021, with most of the route following McCowan (Line 3 mostly followed the GO Transit Stouffville Line corridor, with McCowan station on an east–west alignment). However, in 2020, it was expected that Line 3 could possibly fail several years before the completion of the Line 2 extension. The expected failure did occur on July 24, 2023, when a train derailed, resulted in a decision the following month to not reopen the line.

== Landmarks ==
Here are some nearby landmarks McCowan Road runs near:

Landmark	Cross street	Notes	Image
Toronto Public Library	Kingston Road		
McCowan District	Ellesmere Road		
McCowan Park	Danforth Road		
Scarborough Health Network - General Hospital	Lawrence Avenue		
Scarborough Town Centre	Ellesmere Road/Progress Avenue		
Woodside Square	Finch Avenue		
Milliken District Park	Steeles Avenue		
Markham Sports Dome	14th Avenue		
Milne Dame Conservation Park	South Unionville Avenue		
CF Markville	Highway 7		
Markham Fairgrounds	Elgin Mills Road		
Tree Valley Garden Centre	Stouffville Road		
Applewood Farm	Stouffville Road		
Lemonville Community Centre	McCowan Road		
St. Andrew's East Golf & Country Club	McCowan Road		
Patterson-Hall Tract	McCowan Road		
Black Equestrian	McCowan Road		
Ridgewood Stables	McCowan Road		

== Road information ==
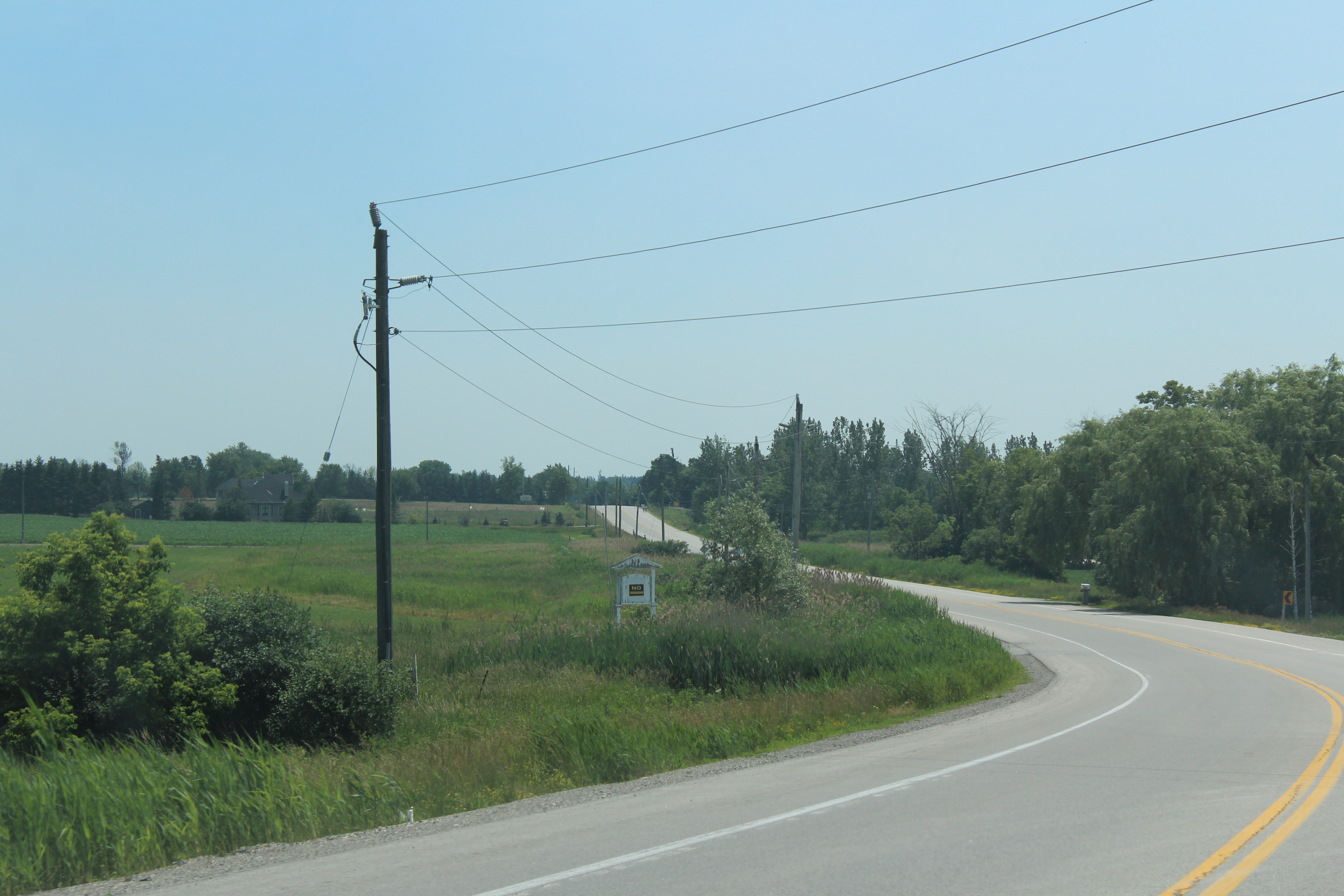
Rural McCowan Road within Whitchurch-Stouffville, looking south from near Stouffville Road.

- Length: 64.3 km (four sections: a 2.7 km combined length for the two short minor southernmost sections; a 34.8 km central section, and a 26.8 km northern section).
- Transportation: YRT Routes 40, and 41 and TTC Route 53B also uses portions of McCowan.
- Attractions: Cresthaven Golf Course, Milne Dam Conservation Park, Markville Mall, Centennial Community Centre and Arena, Williamstown, Markham Fairgrounds, Spring Lakes Golf and Country Club, St. Andrew's East Golf Club, and Maples of Ballantrae Golf Course
- Road status: 4 lane road from its start at Steeles Avenue to Major Mackenzie Drive East. 2 lane road from Major Mackenzie Drive East to Baseline Road.
- Zoning: Low density residential Steeles Avenue to Highway 7 and from Carlton Road to Major Mackenzie Drive East. Lots of farmland and forests between from Major Mackenzie to Baseline Road.
- Additional information: Once named Concession Road 7, McCowan Road was named for James McCowan, a Scottish family patriarch who settled in the area in 1833. The road begins at Kingston Road in Scarborough. McCowan road is interrupted between Faulkner Avenue and Cherry Street.
