= Lawrence Avenue (Toronto) =

Thoroughfare in Toronto, Ontario

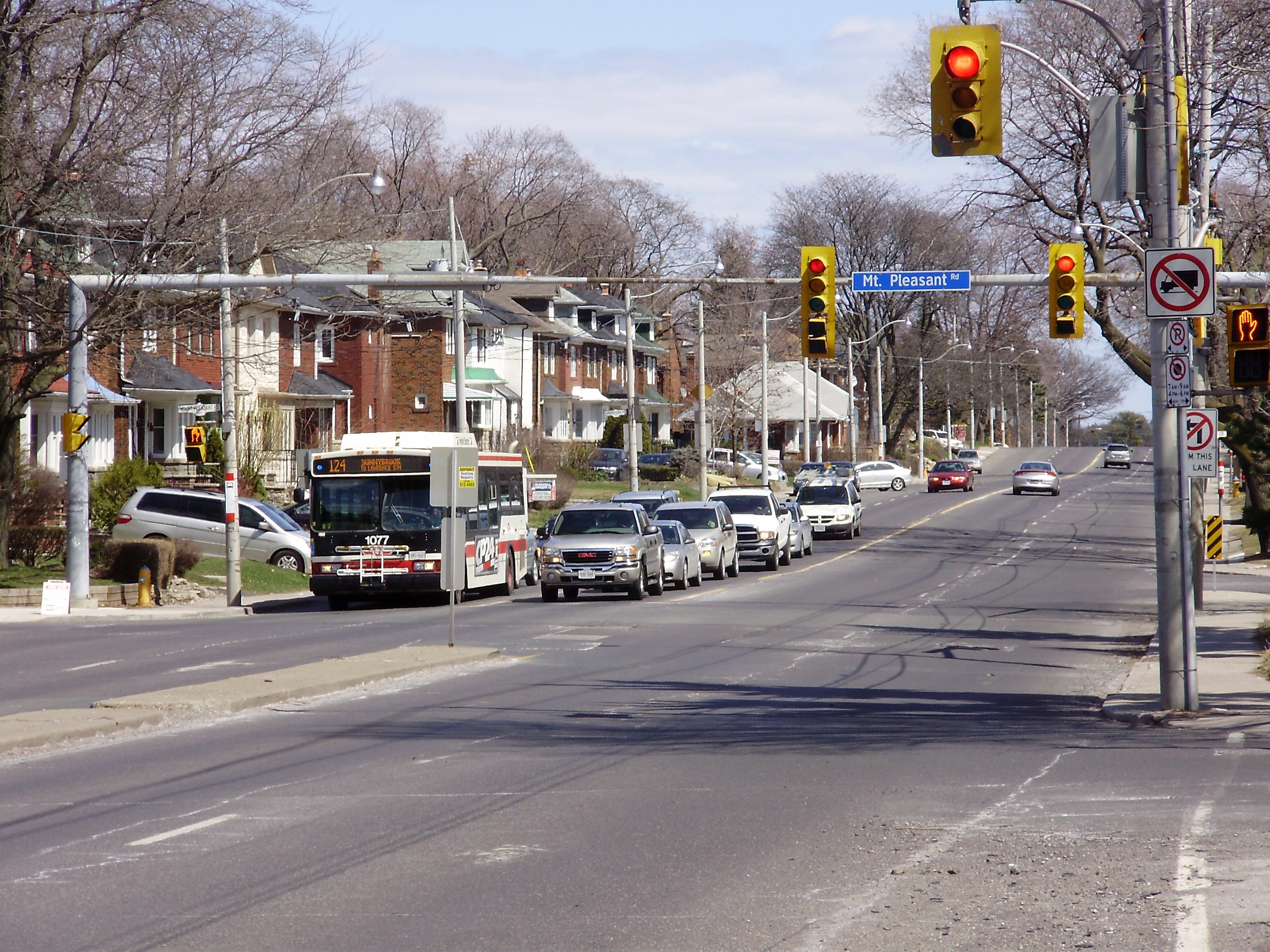
- Westbound traffic waits for a green light at the intersection of Lawrence Avenue East and Mt. Pleasant Road

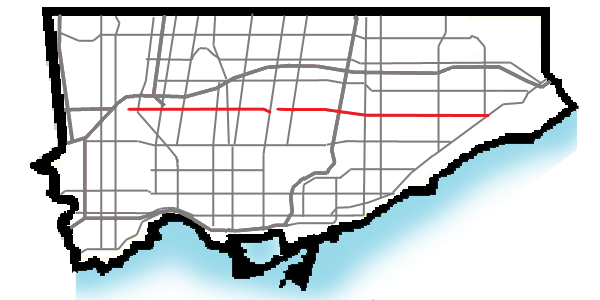
- Lawrence Avenue in Toronto
- Maintained by: City of Toronto
- Length: 35.1 km (21.8 mi)
- Location: Toronto
- West end: Royal York Road (continues as The Westway)
- Major junctions: Scarlett Road; Weston Road; Jane Street; Black Creek Drive; Keele Street; Dufferin Street; Allen Road; Bathurst Street; Avenue Road; Yonge Street; Bayview Avenue; —Gap at Don River West—; Leslie Street; Don Mills Road; Don Valley Parkway; Victoria Park Avenue; Warden Avenue; Kennedy Road; McCowan Road (to Danforth Road (south)); Markham Road; Kingston Road Morningside Avenue Meadowvale Road Port Union Road
- East end: Rouge Hills Drive

Other
Nearby arterial roads in Toronto
← Eglinton Avenue	Wilson Avenue; York Mills Road; Ellesmere Road →

Lawrence Avenue is a major east–west thoroughfare in Toronto, Ontario, Canada. It is divided into east and west portions (Lawrence Avenue East and Lawrence Avenue West) by Yonge Street, the dividing line of east–west streets in Toronto.

== Route description ==
The western terminus of Lawrence Avenue is Royal York Road. Beyond the terminus, the road continues as The Westway, a windy arterial road that ends at Martin Grove Road constructed post-World War II to serve the growing Richview neighbourhood development to the south and the Kingsview Village neighbourhood to the north. Eastwards from a short stretch in Etobicoke; where it runs through the Humber Heights – Westmount neighbourhood, Lawrence crosses the Humber River and enters Weston in the former city of York. East of Weston it enters North York, and passes through the neighbourhoods of Amesbury, Maple Leaf, Glen Park, Lawrence Heights, and Lawrence Manor. Through this section, the street is mostly home to low-rise residential, with some retail and office locations.

East of Avenue Road the road enters the Old City of Toronto, and is a major arterial for the North Toronto neighbourhood. This is one of the wealthiest parts of Toronto. Lawrence remains almost wholly residential through this section, with many single-family homes. Lawrence Avenue East is interrupted at Bayview Avenue, by the west branch of the Don River. A detour north on Bayview leads to Post Road and a connection back to Lawrence Avenue on the east side of the valley. This detour runs through The Bridle Path, one of Toronto's most affluent neighbourhoods. East of Leslie Street, Lawrence becomes a principal arterial road, passing through Don Mills. East of the Don River is the Lawrence Avenue exit of the Don Valley Parkway and on the southside is Old Lawrence Avenue where the road used to lead to a lost bridge that once crossed the Don River.

Lawrence Avenue continues as a six-lane road through most of Scarborough, with many strip malls flanking its sides. Through Scarborough it is the main east–west arterial for a number of neighbourhoods, including Wexford, Bendale, Woburn, West Hill, Centennial, Port Union, and West Rouge. The segment east of Morningside Avenue is primarily residential. The road ends at Rouge Hills Drive, east of Port Union road, at the entrance to the Rouge Beach and Marsh, now part of the Rouge National Urban Park. Nearby the Rouge River, flows through the Rouge Marsh and empties into Lake Ontario.

== Public transit ==
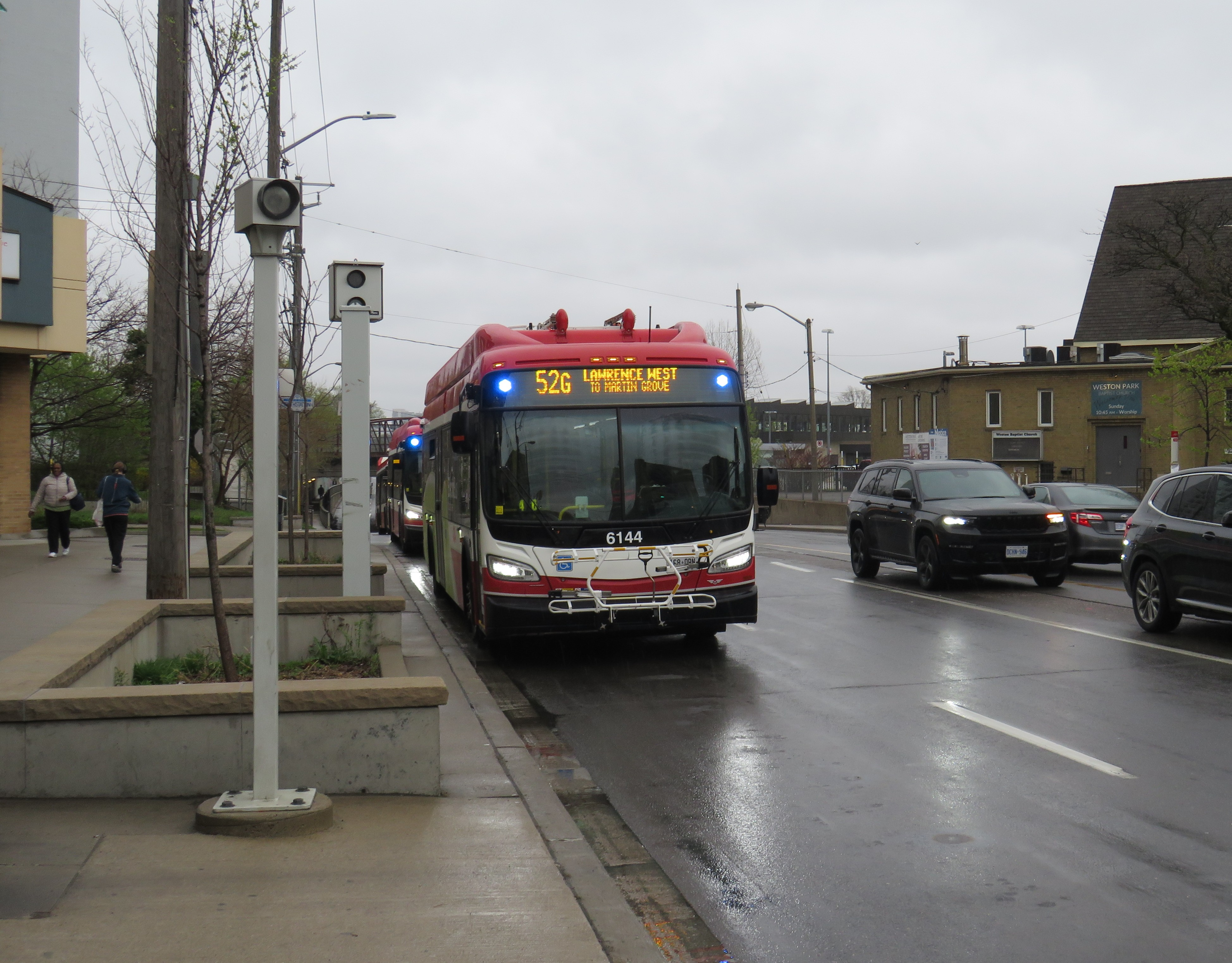
A Toronto Transit Commission 52G Lawrence West bus near Weston Road

The Toronto Transit Commission's 52 Lawrence West and 54 Lawrence East (both among the longest bus routes in the city) and 124 Sunnybrook/162 Lawrence-Donway bus routes provide service along the length of the avenue. The 54A Lawrence East surface route operates from Don Valley station to Starspray Boulevard near Rouge National Urban Park and the 52B Lawrence West surface route operates from Lawrence station to Westwood Square Mall in Mississauga west of Toronto Pearson International Airport via Dixon and Airport Roads. There are two subway stations on Lawrence where it crosses both branches of Line 1 Yonge–University: Lawrence at Yonge Street and Lawrence West at Allen Road . There was also a light metro station near Kennedy Road and Midland Avenue called Lawrence East on the former Line 3 Scarborough, which closed in 2023 due to technical issues. It is slated to replaced by a new station at McCowan Road on a northward extension of Line 2 Bloor-Danforth, which is currently under construction.

Until 1974, service between Lawrence station and Bayview Avenue was provided by the 52 Lawrence and was replaced by the 11 Bayview and 28B Davisville bus routes before they were reorganized in 1991, with the 124 Sunnybrook replacing it. The 58 Malton bus provided service between Lawrence West station to Westwood Square Mall until 2014 when it was replaced by Route 52. There are also two express buses that run only during rush hours: the 952 Lawrence West Express, which also runs from Lawrence Station to Pearson Airport, and the 954 Lawrence East Express, which runs from Don Valley Station to Starspray Boulevard.

GO Transit has two commuter rail stations on Lawrence Avenue: Rouge Hill, on the Lakeshore East line and Weston on the Kitchener line and the UP Express.

== History ==
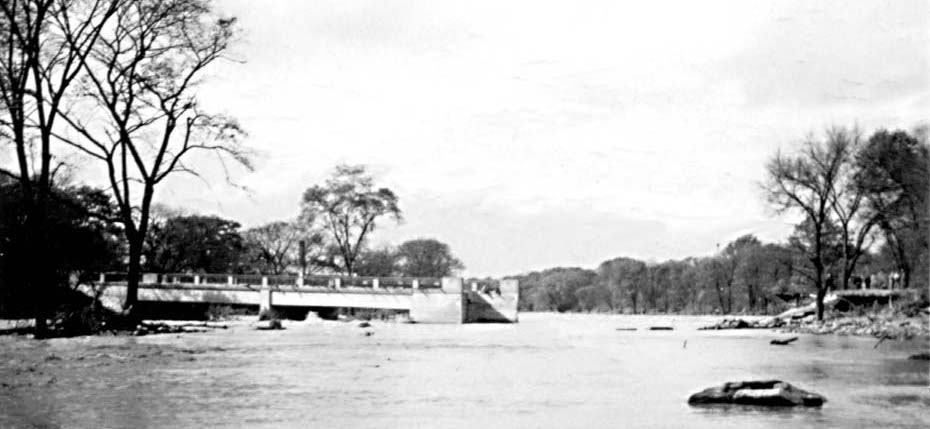
The Lawrence Avenue bridge over the Humber River was washed out by Hurricane Hazel; part of it remained attached to the shore, and the rest was swept away by the river.

Lawrence Avenue was named after Jacob Lawrence, a tanner and farmer in the area of Yonge Street and Lawrence Avenue. It was a side road between lots 5 and 6 in York Township. Originally Lawrence Avenue ran only east of Yonge Street, with the road heading west to Weston being named McDougall Avenue.

East of Victoria Park Avenue, the road was also referred to as 1st Concession Road based on the original survey of the old Township of Scarborough (the line between Concession D and Concession 1). In sections west of Yonge Street, the route for the current road would have been the Fourth Concession with Eglinton Avenue as Line between Third and Fourth Concession and St. Clair Avenue as the Third Concession.

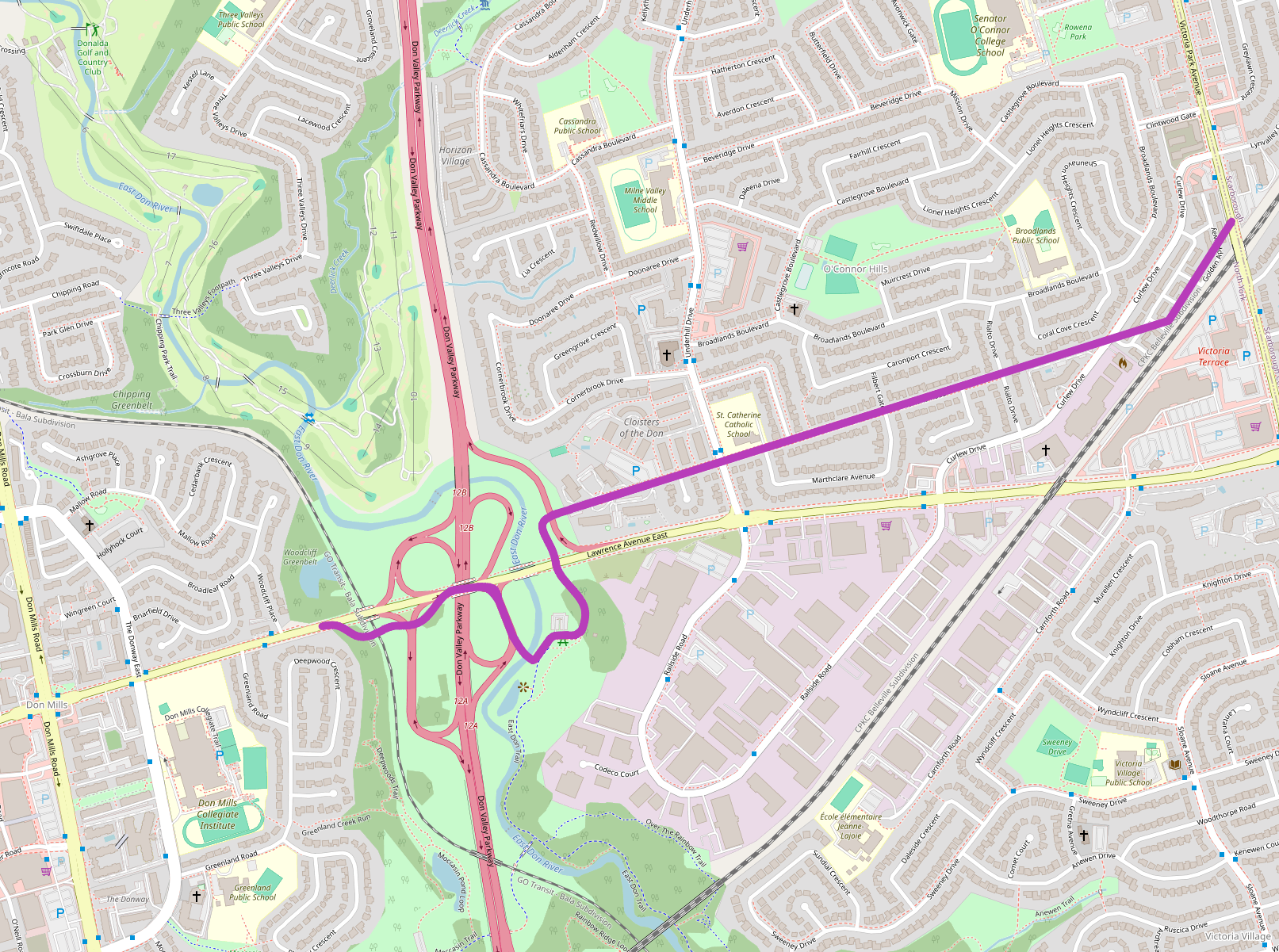
Map of the old route of Lawrence Avenue through the Don Valley.

During Hurricane Hazel in 1954, the Lawrence Avenue bridge over the Humber River was washed out after the river's water levels rose heavily as a result of the rainfall. When the Don Valley Parkway was constructed in the 1960s, Lawrence was rebuilt between the Woodbine Avenue allowance and Victoria Park Avenue, as a "jog eliminator" between the former concession roads of North York and Scarborough Townships. This portion to Kingston Road (former Highway 2) is a minimum of six lanes wide. Lawrence Avenue served as the "Base Line" for the Scarborough Township Survey in the 1800s and remains a key road in the area.

Lawrence Avenue east of Meadowvale Road in Scarborough was part of Colonel Danforth Trail until the early 1970s.

== Landmarks ==
Landmark	Cross street	Notes	Image
Sanctuary Park Cemetery	Royal York Road	Opened 1927 and merged from Riverside Cemetery and Westside Cemeteries in 1977.	
St. Philip Anglican Church	Royal York Road		
Weston GO Station	Weston Road	Opened in 1974 as part of Georgetown Line, it has become a stop along the Union Pearson Express route to Toronto Pearson International Airport in 2015. Nearby was once CPR Weston Station.	
CIBC 750 Lawrence	Dufferin Street	major computer centre, credit card call centre and head office operations built in 1980s	
Lawrence Allen Centre	Allen Road	Former RS Simpson Limited warehouse from the 1950s to 1970s, current mall opened in 1980s. Formerly Lawrence Square Shopping Centre.	
Lawrence West subway station	Allen Road	The station lacks internal art work found on Line 1 Yonge–University, but found on exterior wall on the north side of south station. Opened 1978.	
John Polanyi Collegiate Institute	Allen Road/Allen Expressway	formerly Bathurst Heights Secondary School after being used by Toronto Catholic District School Board (TCDSB) for Dante Alighieri Academy Beatrice Campus and temporary home for Brebeuf College School; built in 1955 for North York Board of Education, building was vacant from 2001 to 2002.	
Lawrence Plaza	Bathurst Street	One of the earliest shopping plazas in Toronto built in 1950s	
Havergal College	Avenue Road	Private and independent girls school moved to current site in 1926.	
Lawrence Park Collegiate Institute	Avenue Road	Public high school opened in 1936 for Toronto Board of Education (now with Toronto District School Board)	
Lawrence subway station	Yonge Street	Underground bus loop with counter to the normal traffic directions, opened in 1973	
Toronto French School	Bayview Avenue	Private and independent French school housed in Sifton Manor, former home of Sir Clifford Sifton from 1922 to 1947 and acquired by school in 1972.	
Glendon College, York University	Bayview Avenue	Situated in the former home of Edward Rogers Wood built in 1924 and sold 1950; home to York University since 1966.	
Edwards Gardens	Leslie Street	Name for former mill operator Rupert E. Edwards opened in 1956 a Metro Toronto owned park	
Shops at Don Mills	Don Mills Road	Formerly Don Mills Centre which was demolished in 2006.	
Don Mills Collegiate Institute	Don Mills Road	Public high school opened in 1959 for North York Board of Education (now with Toronto District School Board)	
Wexford Heights United Church	Warden Avenue	Zion Wexford United Church built 1842 with additions in 1956 and 1961 added	
St. Lawrence Martyr Catholic Church	Birchmount Road	Opened 1959	
Winston Churchill Collegiate Institute	Kennedy Road	Open 1953 for Township of Scarborough and Scarborough Board of Education (now with Toronto District School Board)	
Pizza Nova	Kennedy Road	Pizzeria franchised restaurant opened in 1963, original operates as Nova Ristorante	
Lawrence East RT station	Kennedy Road	Opened in 1985 and will be closed in the 2020s when line re-built.	
Thomson Memorial Park	Brimley Road	Named after Scarborough's first European (Scottish) born pioneer family and opened in 1960.	
Scarborough General Hospital	McCowan Road	Opened 1956	
St. Rose of Lima Catholic Church	McCowan Road		
Cedarbrae Mall	Markham Road	Outdoor strip plaza opened in 1962 and later enclosed.	
St. Stephen's Presbyterian Church	Scarborough Golf Club Road	Built 1962 and replaced the former Golf Club Road Presbyterian Church	
Sir Oliver Mowat Collegiate Institute	Centennial Road	Public high school opened 1969 for Scarborough Board of Education (now with Toronto District School Board)	
Rouge Hill GO Station	Eastern Avenue	Station opened in 1967 and upgraded with current station infrastructure and was in what was once part of Pickering.	
Rouge National Urban Park	Rouge Hill Drive	The largest urban protected area in North America. Lawrence Ave East ends at the driveway to the Rouge Beach portion of the park, with a beach on the shoreline of Lake Ontario. The Waterfront Trail along the lakeshore provides pedestrian and bicycle access to Pickering.	
