= Danforth Avenue =

Arterial street in Toronto

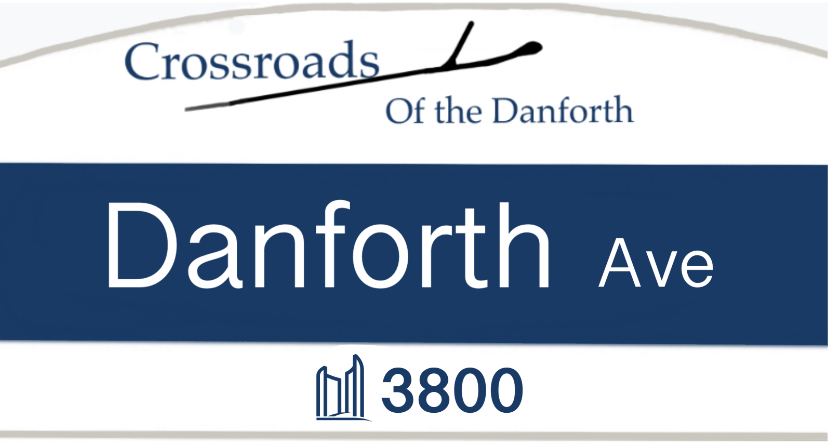
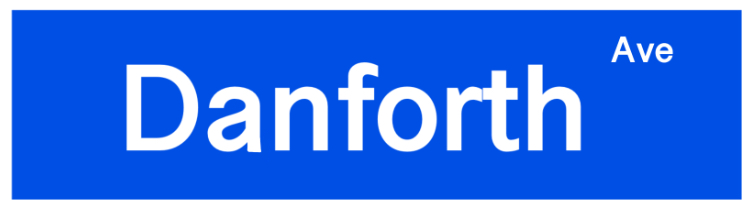

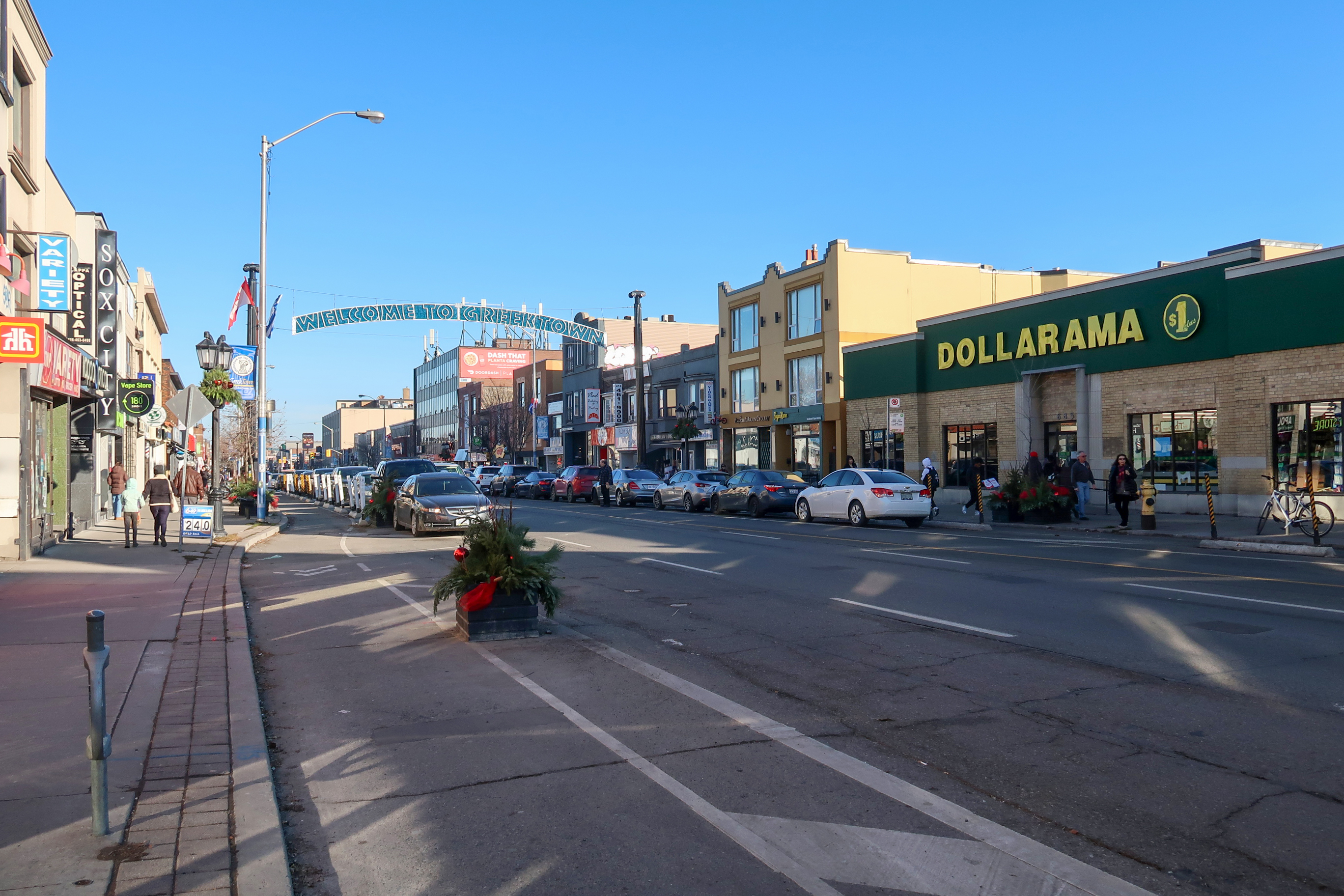
- Danforth Avenue near Greektown in 2022

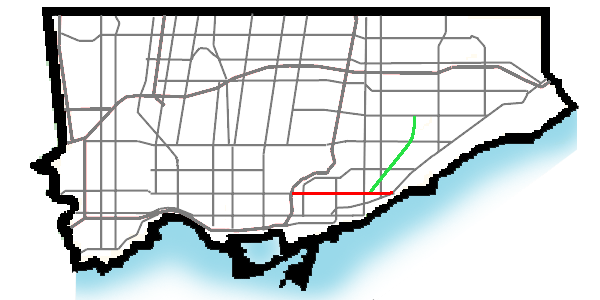
- Map of Danforth Avenue (Red) and Danforth Road (Green) within Toronto
- Maintained by: City of Toronto
- Length: 9.2 km (5.7 mi)
- Location: Toronto
- West end: Don River (Continues as Bloor Street)
- Major junctions: Broadview Avenue; Pape Avenue; Donlands Avenue; Coxwell Avenue; Woodbine Avenue; Warden Avenue; Birchmount Road; Kennedy Road; Victoria Park Avenue; Danforth Road; Warden Avenue; Birchmount Road
- East end: Kingston Road

Other
Nearby arterial roads in Toronto
← Gerrard Street	O'Connor Drive; St. Clair Avenue →

Danforth Avenue (informally also known as the Danforth) and Danforth Road are two historically related arterial streets in Toronto, Ontario, Canada. Danforth Avenue is an east–west street that begins in Old Toronto at the Prince Edward Viaduct as a physical continuation of Bloor Street and continues for about 6 kilometres (3.7 mi) east through old Toronto, about 350 metres (1,150 ft) of old East York, and a further 5 kilometres (3.1 mi) in Scarborough until it intersects with Kingston Road via a ramped interchange. Danforth Road splits off the Avenue west of Warden Avenue and runs diagonally northeast until south of Lawrence Avenue, where it continues as McCowan Road.

Line 2 Bloor–Danforth of the Toronto subway runs just north of Danforth Avenue from the Don River as far as Main Street station, before gradually veering north as it heads east.

== History ==
Danforth Road was named for American contractor Asa Danforth Jr., who built portions of what would become Queen Street and Kingston Road. He started work in 1799 on Danforth's Road as (originally) a hundred-mile route from Scarborough to the Trent River. That road was completed in 1801, but soon fell into disrepair and was largely replaced by the 1817 Kingston Road stagecoach route.

Before being named Danforth Avenue, maps referred to it as Concession Line Road.

Danforth Avenue, named because it was created to connect Toronto to Danforth Road, was officially built by the Don and Danforth Plank Road Company in 1851 to Broadview Avenue, as well as connecting to Kingston Road.

In Scarborough, Danforth Road connects Danforth Avenue with McCowan Road. It is possible, therefore, to stand at the intersection of "Danforth and Danforth", i.e. Danforth Avenue and Danforth Road. Local references, therefore, are careful to note whether it is the Avenue or the Road being referred to—although the term "the Danforth" always refers to Danforth Avenue, and never to Danforth Road.

Warden Avenue and Birchmount Road in Scarborough are two of the four routes to intersect with both Danforth Avenue and Danforth Road (the others being residential Scotia and Medford avenues). With other routes, the distinction is unnecessary; for example, "Victoria Park and Danforth" means Danforth Avenue, while "Kennedy and Danforth" means Danforth Road.

Previously, Danforth Road continued around the Highland Creek along local residential roadways now known as:

- Painted Post Drive – two broken sections from Bellamy Road to Scarborough Golf Club Road north of Lawrence Avenue East
- Military Trail – begins east of Scarborough Golf Club Road from Ellesmere to Morrish Road (does not connect with Kingston Road but rather as a short exit ramp)
- Colonel Danforth Trail – near Kingston Road and Lawson Roads to near Meadowvale Road and Lawrence Avenue East
- Clonmore Drive – from near Victoria Park Avenue and Kingston Road to Warden south of Danforth Avenue
- Highland Creek Drive – short street branching off from Colonel Danforth Trail and Kingston Road southeast and ends within Colonel Danforth Park

== Route description ==
The west end of Danforth Ave. spans the Don River valley, the Don Valley Parkway and Bayview Avenue via the Prince Edward Viaduct. West of that bridge, the street continues as Bloor Street.

Line 2 Bloor–Danforth of the Toronto subway system runs parallel to most of the road's route, offset to the north some 50 metres (160 ft). The subway follows Danforth from the Viaduct west of Broadview Station to Main Street station. Danforth GO Station, just off Main Street, takes its name from the avenue, where the commuter rail line intersects with it, on the Lakeshore East route. Danforth is served by the Toronto Transit Commission bus system only east of Main Street Station. Routes 16 McCowan and 113 Danforth serve the road during the day, and 300 Bloor-Danforth and 316 Kingston Road-McCowan run during the night.

Danforth Avenue was formerly designated as Ontario Highway 5 from the Don River (at Bloor Street) east to Kingston Road. Like many urban stretches of provincial roadway, it was formally decommissioned as a Connecting Link on January 1, 1998.

=== Points of interest ===
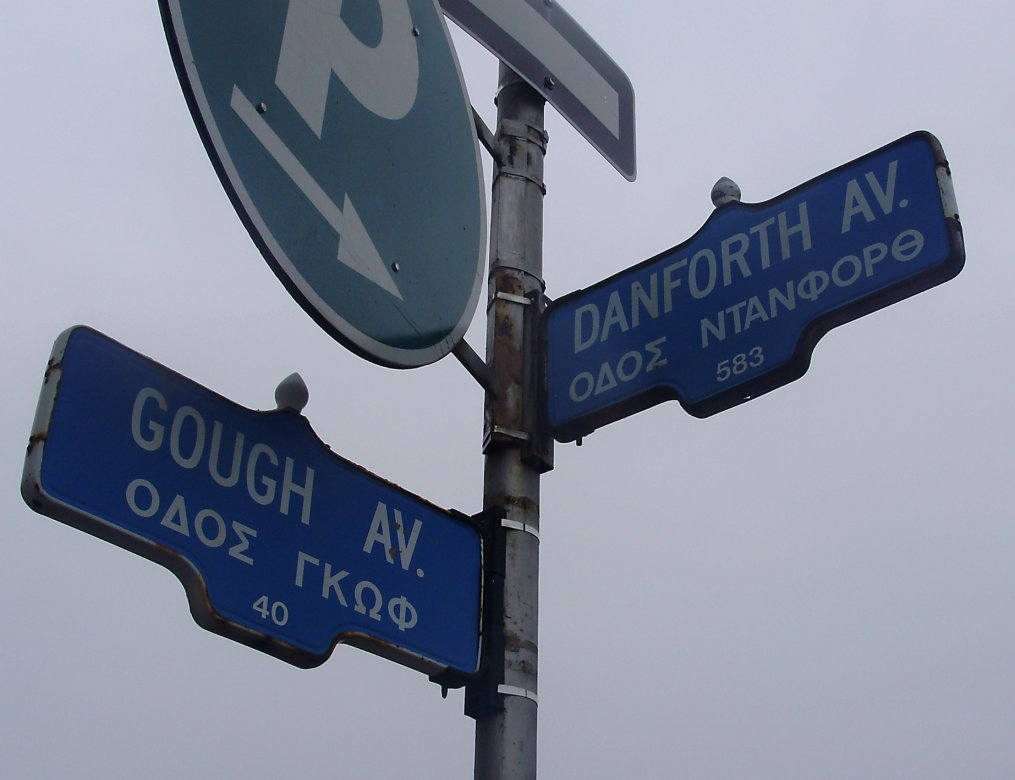
Many street signs along the western Danforth are in both English and Greek

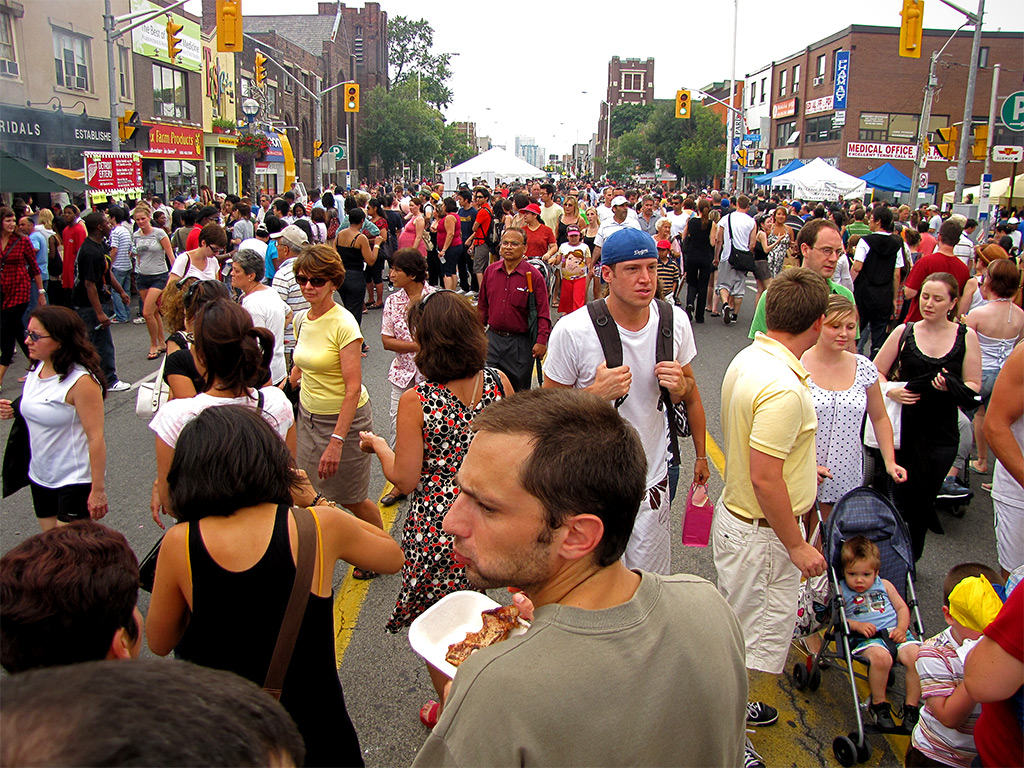
Taste of the Danforth takes place each August

- Greektown is located on the Danforth.
- Shoppers World Danforth, a World War II munitions plant (and before that, a Ford Motor Company plant). It became a Ford plant again after the war until Ford moved to Oakville in 1953, then an American Motors (AMC) plant, producing Ramblers, Nashes and Hudsons, before AMC moved to Brampton. The buildings were retained and were converted to a shopping mall in 1962.
- Birchmount Stadium and Scarborough Arena Gardens.

=== Recent events ===
On Christmas Eve 2001, the Woodbine Building Supply fire occurred. The hardware store was located at the intersection of Danforth and Woodbine Avenues. It was one of the biggest fires in Toronto's history, as 170 firefighters were required to bring the six-alarm blaze under control. The building was less than 50 m (160 ft) from residences in the neighbourhood and more than fifty families had to evacuate their homes on Christmas morning. One person was killed and another was severely disfigured. Police and insurance quickly suspected arson and several people have since been convicted. The store's owners have since built a 12-storey condo building on the site.

There was a shooting on the Danforth in July 2018.

=== References in pop culture ===
- The band Rush reference the street for the instrumental "La Villa Strangiato" from the album Hemispheres (1978), of which section VII is subtitled "Danforth & Pape".
- The Barenaked Ladies reference this street in their song "The Old Apartment" from the album Born on a Pirate Ship (1996) in the line "I know we don't live here anymore/We bought an old house on the Danforth".

== See also ==
- Ontario Highway 33 – now Loyalist Parkway and parts of the road once named Danforth's Road, a stagecoach route
