= Municipal expressway =

Highway maintained by an Ontario municipality

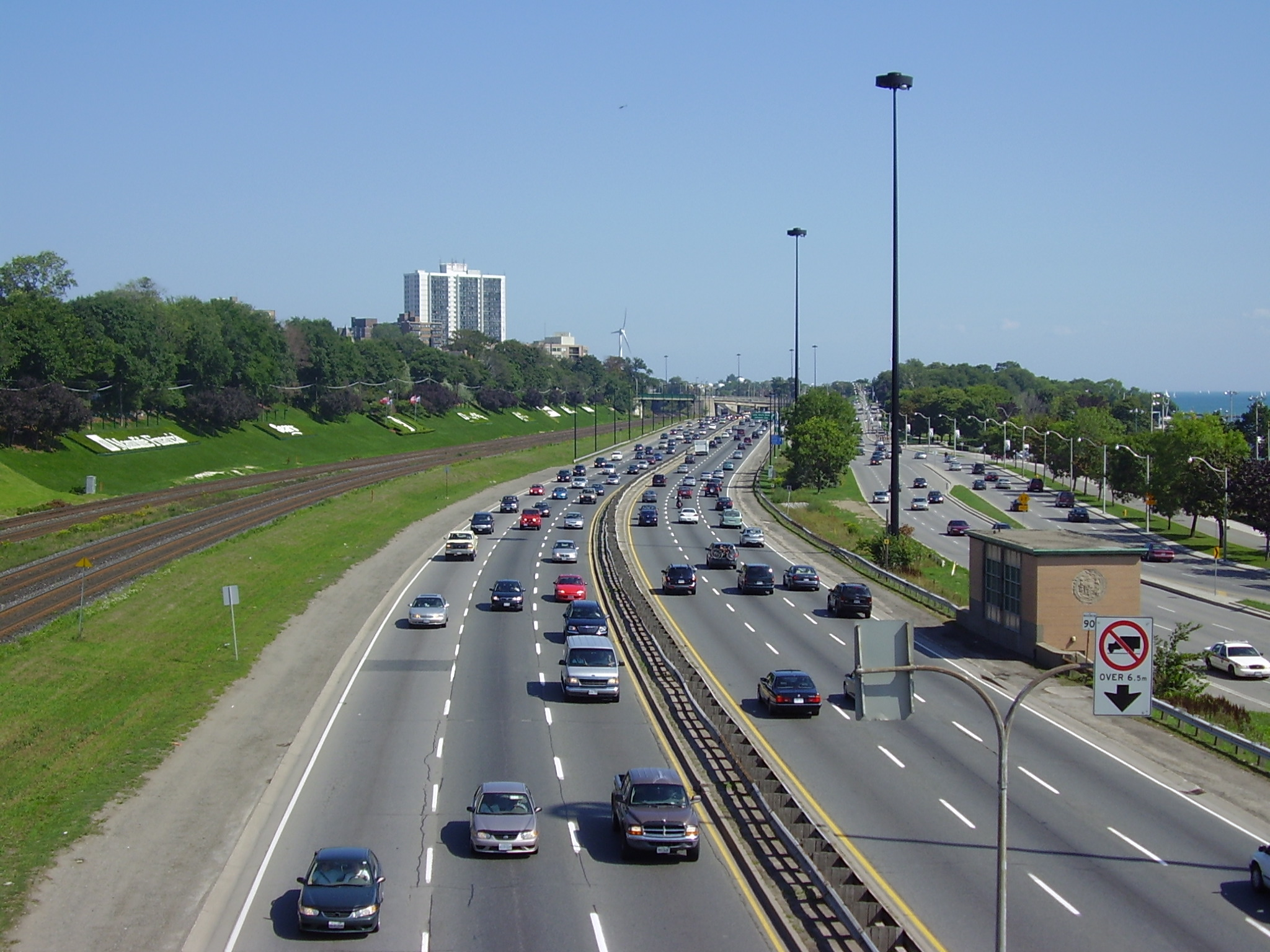
View of the Gardiner Expressway, the first modern municipal expressway in Ontario.

A municipal expressway in Ontario is a controlled-access highway maintained by an individual municipality rather than the provincial government. Municipal expressways are not a part of the Ontario Provincial Highway Network. Instead, they form parts of the different municipal road networks in Ontario.

== History ==
The first expressway built under municipal jurisdiction was the Gardiner Expressway as a part of the expressway system proposed for Toronto by Metropolitan Toronto, followed by the Don Valley Parkway, and Allen Road (originally the Spadina Expressway). The province built Black Creek Drive in the right-of-way originally intended for the Highway 400 South Extension, and then transferred it to Metro Toronto in 1982. The Gardiner did carry the provincial routing of Ontario Highway 2 until 1998, but was always locally owned and maintained.

=== Downloading ===
Several highways were originally built and maintained by the province for decades before being downloaded to local authorities. The biggest transfers happening in 1997-1998, including the E. C. Row Expressway (then part of Ontario Highway 2), Ontario Highway 17 Queensway (which became Ottawa Road 174), Ontario Highway 2A, and the easternmost segment of the Queen Elizabeth Way.

=== Uploading ===
Municipal expressways have been seen as a substantial financial burden for the municipalities that have to operate and maintain them. This includes those that were previously in the provincial inventory and/or have high maintenance costs; for instance the Gardiner Expressway's westernmost segment (formerly the eastenmost section of the QEW) was not upgraded when downloaded by the province while the Gardiner's elevated section requires frequent repairs. As a result, several municipalities have expressed interested for the responsibility of the highways to be uploaded to the provincial government. In 2014, the ideal of uploading Hamilton's two municipal expressways, the Lincoln M. Alexander Parkway and the Red Hill Valley Parkway. At the time, the Ministry of Transportation of Ontario said there was no precedent for such an upload.

In November 2023, the City of Toronto and the Government of Ontario reached an agreement to upload the Don Valley Parkway and the Gardiner Expressway, transferring responsibility for the maintenance of the highway to the provincial government. The deal freed up over CA$1.2 billion in the city's budget. In March 2024, a similar deal was reached between the City of Ottawa and the Government of Ontario to upload Ottawa Road 174 to the provincial government as a part of a larger agreement.

Following the deal made between the City of Toronto and the Government of Ontario to upload the Don Valley Parkway and the Gardiner Expressway, several other municipalities also expressed interested in uploading their municipal expressways. The Hamilton's city council passed a motion to request that the Ministry of Transportation of Ontario take over the Lincoln M. Alexander Parkway and the Red Hill Valley Parkway. The mayor of Windsor also asked the province about uploading the E. C. Row Expressway.

== See also ==
- List of municipal expressways
- List of controlled-access highways in Ontario
- Ontario Provincial Highway Network
- National Capital Commission#Ottawa parkways
