= Cancelled expressways in Toronto =

Unbuilt freeways in Toronto, Canada

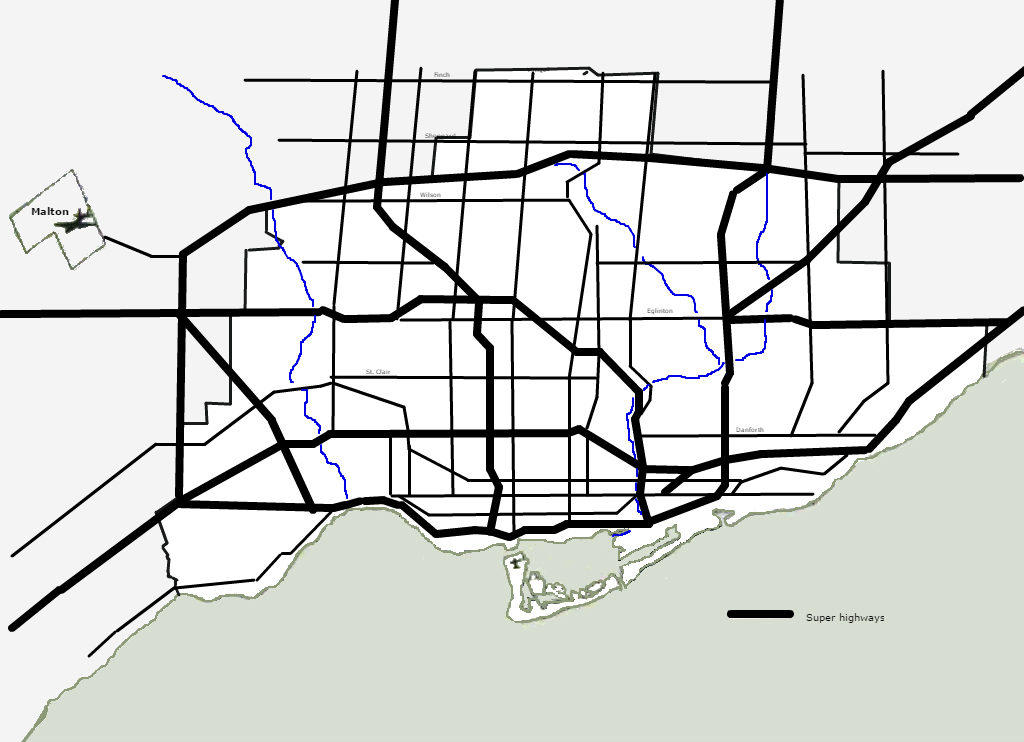
1943 City of Toronto Planning Board plan to criss-cross Toronto and suburbs with highways.

The cancelled expressways in Toronto were a planned series of municipal expressways in Toronto, Ontario, Canada that were only partially built or cancelled due to public opposition. Metropolitan Toronto's system of superhighways or freeways were developed during a period of rapid growth in the suburban municipalities and were intended to handle the projected level of traffic into and out of the core. At the same time, the Province of Ontario was expanding the 400-Series Highways which would connect to municipalities outside of Metro.

A coalition of citizens, many living within the path of the projected expressways campaigned against the plans. A former resident of New York City, Jane Jacobs brought her experience fighting expressways there to the coalition. The coalition was opposed to the demolition of homes and park lands, air pollution, noise and the high cost of construction. The Spadina Expressway, planned since the 1940s, was cancelled in 1971 after being only partially constructed. After the Spadina cancellation, the remaining expressway plans were abandoned and one strip of built expressway was eventually torn down.

== History ==
By the 1940s, urban development extended past the city of Toronto's borders. It was recognized within the planning department of the city that population growth would take place and that the farmlands outside of the city's border would be developed. In 1943, the City of Toronto Planning Board developed a plan for the area within a nine-mile radius of Yonge Street and Queen Street. It included a network of superhighways:

- Lakeshore Expressway (which was implemented as the Gardiner Expressway), from QEW-427 interchange along the waterfront east to Scarborough's eastern border,
- Spadina Expressway
- North along Coxwell Avenue to today's Don Valley and 401 interchange,
- Toronto By-Pass (this comprised the highway stretches of today's Highway 427 from the QEW to 401 and Highway 401 from Highway 427 to Pickering)
- From 427-QEW interchange, along Bloor Street east to meet Don Valley, then east along Gerrard to meet Lakeshore at Victoria Park
- An unnamed highway which started at the foot of today's Don Valley, then north-west to Eglinton, then west along Eglinton to the vicinity of Pearson airport.

Source: Sewell (2009)

=== Metro forms ===
Metro Toronto 1954 plan. With some changes, this resembles the currently built network.

With the creation of Metropolitan Toronto (Metro) in 1953, a new level of government was created with the authority to build what was necessary to facilitate the growth expected within the Metro area. Metro would build the infrastructure, such as sewers, sewage treatment plants, public transit, highways and arterial roads, leaving local roads and land use planning to the individual governments. Based on the 1940s plans, Metro planned to build an extensive network of highways that crisscrossed the city. While Metro would pay 100% of the cost of most infrastructure, Ontario paid 50% of the cost of road projects.

While the provincial government would plan and build highways crossing Metro and highways to connect to municipalities outside of Metro, Metro would focus on roads serving the downtown core and connecting the downtown core to the growing suburbs. The plan was centred on a number of major routes, notably the "Toronto-Barrie Highway" (Highway 400) on the north-west of Toronto, and the Queen Elizabeth Way on the southwest side. The province was already deep in the planning process for what would become Highway 400 along the northern reaches of the city, in what was then farmland far from the city core. To connect these highways, which ended at the city limits for the most part, with the downtown core, Metro would be responsible for continuing construction into the city.

=== Beginning of construction ===
Construction of the network started with what was then known as the Lakeshore Expressway, which would connect the QEW from its terminus at the Humber River with the downtown core. The initial western section opened in 1958, continuing eastward as an elevated highway to York Street in the city core in 1962, and further to the Don River by 1964. During construction the Lakeshore was renamed the Gardiner Expressway, after the first chair of Metropolitan Toronto and major supporter of the expressway plans, Fred Gardiner. A second expressway, the Don Valley Parkway, opened between Bloor Street and Eglinton Avenue in 1961, and continued to develop north and south until it connected to Highway 401 in the north and the Gardiner Expressway in the south.

These plans were only the beginning of an even larger network that was first proposed in 1959 and fully developed by 1966 when it became the official plan. In 1959, Metro developed the concept of 'rings' of expressways around the central core. The inner ring included the Crosstown east-west along Davenport connecting to the Don Valley in the east and the Highway 400 extension to the west, the Highway 400 extension down Christie and Grace Streets from Davenport, connecting to the Gardiner near Fort York just west of the downtown core, and the Gardiner and Don Valley Expressways. The outer ring is composed of Highway 401 along the north, Highway 427 on the west, the Gardiner on the south and the Scarborough to the east, connecting the Gardiner Expressway in the downtown core with Highway 401 in the far eastern reaches of the city. Other links included the Richview, a shorter at-grade expressway connecting the western end of the Crosstown at the Highway 400 extension with Highway 27 further west, and eventually connecting to the proposed Ontario Highway 403 and the Spadina Expressway which ran north–south and connected the middle of Highway 401 with the downtown core, ending on Spadina Avenue near the University of Toronto.

By 1962, the Spadina Expressway project was approved and construction proceeded in 1963 from Wilson Avenue south to Lawrence Avenue. At first, Metro approved only the construction from Lawrence to Wilson. However, the province would not give funds for its construction unless Metro approved the whole route, which was done. During construction, priority was given to access to the new Yorkdale Shopping Centre, which opened in 1964. Drivers could drive from Lawrence Avenue north along a paved section of the expressway north to Yorkdale. The interchange to Highway 401 would be completed later. In 1961, one link in the inner ring, the Crosstown, was cancelled by Metro Council, although carried forward by Metro planning officials. Toronto and Metro proposed alternate routes for Highway 400, with Toronto favouring a route along the railway lines.

Metro developed its official transportation plan, starting in 1964 by evaluating three concepts, a road-oriented plan, a transit-oriented plan, and a mixed plan, referred to as the 'balanced system'. The road-oriented system omitted the Spadina subway and included all of the expressways. The mixed system did not omit any roads but did omit a Queen Street subway. The transit-oriented plan included Eglinton Avenue and Queen Street subways, extending the Spadina north to Vaughan, and extending the Bloor-Danforth line east into Scarborough. It also included express bus routes along the expressways and commuter rail. The inner ring of highways was not included.

	'Balanced' plan	Road-oriented	Transit-oriented
Facilities
Distance of expressways^{A}	175 mi (282 km)	177 mi (285 km)	81 mi (130 km)
Distance of rapid transit lines	29 mi (47 km)	14 mi (23 km)	88 mi (142 km)
System performance
Average trip speed	20.6 mph (33.2 km/h)	16.8 mph (27.0 km/h)	19.7 mph (31.7 km/h)
Average trip time	28.9 min	31.9 min	28.3 min
Vehicle performance
Average vehicle speed	26.5 mph (42.6 km/h)	22.7 mph (36.5 km/h)	20.6 mph (33.2 km/h)
Average speed on expressways	38.9 mph (62.6 km/h)	30.9 mph (49.7 km/h)	23.0 mph (37.0 km/h)
Average speed on arterial roads	21.9 mph (35.2 km/h)	18.1 mph (29.1 km/h)	19.6 mph (31.5 km/h)
Average trip length	11.3 mi (18.2 km)	10.8 mi (17.4 km)	8.7 mi (14.0 km)
Average trip time	25.6 min	28.5 min	25.5 min
Costs^{B}
Costs below the balanced system	base cost	$240 million below	$912 million below
Congestion
Distance of heavily congested roads	32 mi (51 km)	28 mi (45 km)	32 mi (51 km)
Location of heavy congestion	mainly downtown	scattered, some downtown	scattered, none downtown, none on Bathurst

- ^{A} – Distances were direct routes between points, not distances along road alignments
- ^{B} – costs were estimated by Nowlan at $16 million per actual mile ($26 million per km) (the base routes were 197 mi (317 km) of expressway)

Sources:

- Metro Toronto Planning Board, The Metropolitan Transportation Plan, 1964.
- Nowlan and Nowlan (1970), pg. 42

The balanced plan, expected to be implemented by 1980, was estimated to cost $1 billion to construct. The expressway component (Crosstown, Spadina and Gardiner and Don Valley extensions) was estimated to cost $210 million.

The mixed system, although it was the most expensive, was approved by Metro Council in December 1966. The official plan now included the Crosstown again, although it was not approved for construction. Toronto still rejected the Crosstown, and the Ontario government rewrote the Toronto city official plan to accept that it might be built. Construction of the Crosstown was not expected until the 1970s. After completion of the Spadina south to Lawrence, approval was then given to proceed south to Eglinton, and start the process of expropriating homes and park lands for its construction, although without an interchange for the Crosstown.

=== Problems and protests ===
The construction plans became a point of growing protests in the late 1960s. The route of the Gardiner Expressway and the Don Valley Parkway had run mostly through industrial areas, parkland, or generally unused areas and had not generated much public concern during early construction. This changed as the Gardiner Expressway approached the downtown area, which resulted in the demolishing of long-established neighbourhoods. The planned expressways would require the same throughout the city and, with the exception of the northern ends of the roads, generally ran through well-settled areas. In particular, the Spadina Expressway ran through the Forest Hill, The Annex, Harbord Village, Kensington Market and Chinatown neighbourhoods, while the Crosstown would present a below-grade barrier on The Annex's northern border. The Crosstown would run beside Rosedale on its eastern end, displacing a forested ravine.

A new resident to The Annex, Jane Jacobs, had been instrumental in blocking the Lower Manhattan Expressway in New York City before moving to Canada in 1969. According to Jacobs, it was the construction of expressways into major American cities that led to an exodus of the middle class, and the death of once-vibrant downtown cores. With David and Nadine Nowlan, they formed the "Stop Spadina And Save Our City" group, which grew to become a major rallying point for anti-expressway feeling in the city. By the late 1960s, the Spadina Expressway had become a "hot" topic politically.

To add to the problems, by 1969 construction of the Spadina Expressway had just reached Eglinton Avenue (although paved only to Lawrence Avenue), less than half its planned route, but had already spent almost all of its $79 million budget. Metro Toronto had to return to the Ontario Municipal Board for additional loans, which were provided in a two-to-one decision. Stop Spadina appealed, and construction was halted pending the outcome. In 1971 Premier John Robarts retired and handed the Premiership to William Davis, who agreed to hear an appeal of the Municipal Board's decision.

=== Cancellation of Spadina Expressway ===
The Globe and Mail announces the cancellation of the Spadina Expressway, effectively the end of expressway construction in Toronto.

On June 3, 1971, Davis rose in the Provincial Legislature and stated:

If we are building a transportation system to serve the automobile, the Spadina Expressway would be a good place to start. But if we are building a transportation system to serve people, the Spadina Expressway is a good place to stop. It is our determination to opt for the latter.

— Bill Davis, June 1971,

Davis agreed to continue funding for the construction of the Toronto Transit Commission (TTC) subway line (now part of Line 1 Yonge–University) that was part of the original project plans, and later, in 1972, agreed to complete the unfinished portion of the Expressway between Eglinton and Lawrence. The debate on whether or not to continue the Expressway further south from Eglinton continued throughout the 1970s.

=== Aftermath ===
The cancellation of the Spadina Expressway heralded the end of expressway construction in Toronto. Work on the other expressways in the system was simply abandoned. Highway 400 initially stopped at Jane Street where the province left it, although the route was later extended to Weston Road as Black Creek Drive (scaled down to a four lane at-grade expressway, instead of a six lane freeway). The western terminus of the Richview forms the oversized interchange between Highways 401 and 427 and Eglinton Avenue near Pearson Airport. Highway 403 was built but instead now connects further west to Highway 401, at another major interchange which also connects to Highway 410. Both ends of the Scarborough Expressway were built, in the east as a large interchange that quickly turns into a much smaller exchange with Kingston Road, and in the downtown core as a several-kilometre extension of the Gardiner past the Don Valley Parkway to Leslie Street.

Lands acquired for the proposed Scarborough and Richview Expressways remained in municipal government ownership for another twenty years after the shelving of the proposals. Much of the land remains in public ownership today, though future uses have not yet been determined.

In 2001, the Gardiner East extension was demolished between the Don Valley Parkway and Leslie Street, and there were plans to remove the connection to the Don Valley Parkway entirely, as of 2021 the Gardiner's connection with the Don Valley Parkway is being realigned.

=== Ongoing political debate ===
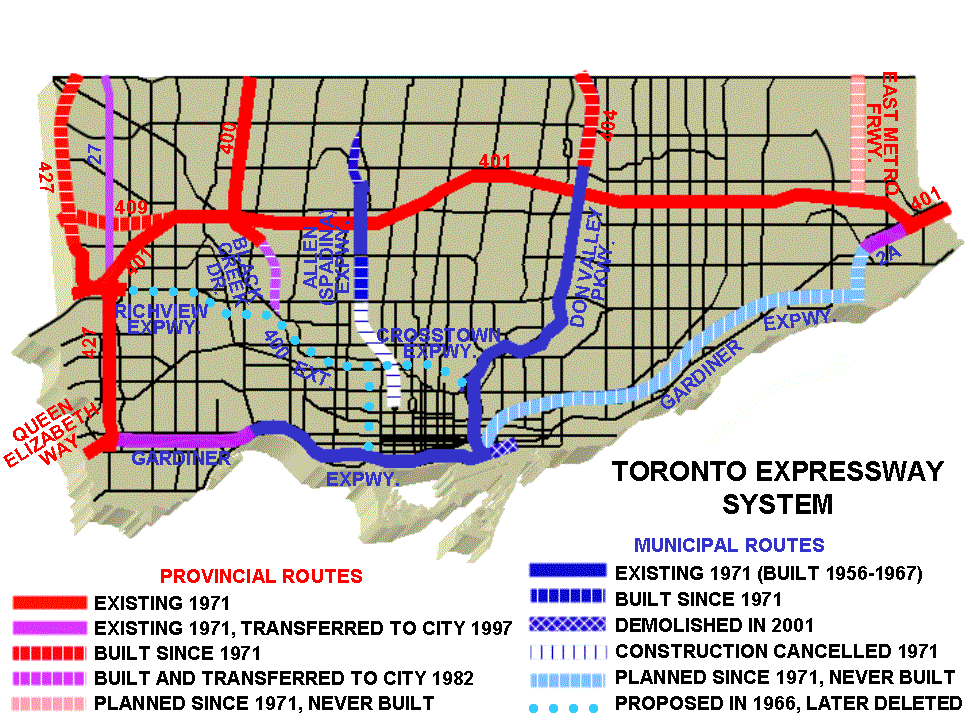
Metro plan of expressway system.

In the subsequent decades, the Peel Region and York Region suburbs of Toronto have expanded greatly in population and industrial development. The availability of land for development and pro-development municipal governments has led to extensive residential and industrial development. An extensive highway network has been developed of Highways 403, 407, 410, 427 and 404 within those suburbs, and all these freeways remain in the provincial inventory at the present.

In comparison, Metro Toronto has not built any new expressways since the cancellation of the Spadina, with new expressways instead constructed by the province with some later being downloaded to municipal control. The province's planned routing for the Belfield Expressway was revised so that it would not cross through Malton towards Brampton but instead terminate at Toronto International Airport; the province also expropriated the right-of-way and opened the freeway as Highway 409. The segment of Highway 404 in Metro Toronto was originally intended as a northern extension of the Don Valley Parkway between Sheppard Ave and Steeles Ave, while the province would continue it into York Region, although the province ending up assuming that entire project within Metro. Highway 400 initially stopped at Jane Street where the province left it, although the route was later extended to Weston Road as Black Creek Drive (scaled down to a four lane at-grade expressway, instead of a six lane freeway) and transferred from the province to Metro Toronto upon completion in 1982. Highway 2A and a section of QEW (the segment east of Highway 427, re-designated as part of the Gardiner) were downloaded to municipal control in 1997, causing local politicians to criticize these transfers as a financial burden on Toronto.

As an alternative to road construction, the city and province have made efforts to expand TTC services and the GO Transit commuter train service. Although TTC ridership declined in the 1980s and 1990s, it has recently begun to reverse the trend. In 2008, a new record for ridership was set, indicating a growing demand for alternatives to private vehicles for personal transportation. Since the expressways reached capacity in the 1970s, commuting has been handled by increased transit, to the point that only 10% of commuters use the Gardiner Expressway to get downtown, according to 2006 figures.

Highway advocates, notably frequent political candidate Abel Van Wyk, believe in the necessity of the expressways to meet high demand from suburban growth and automobile traffic between suburbs and the downtown core. Those advocates also believe in the necessity of new expressways to reduce the traffic congestion of the existing expressways. Opposing groups, including residents of the core, are opposed to expansion because of the air pollution, noise and health effects associated with expressways. These impact the standard of living in urban areas and hinder urban growth. Transit advocates point to the higher capacity of a transit line compared to an expressway as better use of government resources. Cycling advocates promote cycling routes as an alternative for commuting and recreation.

Special interest groups have formed to advocate for expressway construction in Toronto. A Scarborough-based citizen group called the Citizens' Transportation Alliance of Greater Toronto advocates for a restart of expressway construction in Toronto. The group proposes the construction of one new expressway to the northwest of Toronto, most likely an expansion of Black Creek Drive, and one expressway to the east through Scarborough, along a hydro corridor or an expansion of Kingston Road. The group also supports filling in the 'missing links' of the arterial road grid. Based upon the group's proposal, a prominent association of automobile owners, the Canadian Automobile Association, published a plan in 2004 of expansion within the City borders to address the congestion. This included the building of a new Scarborough Expressway through a route over Lake Ontario, new expressways and arterial roads and the building of the Richview Expressway. It was quickly dismissed by members of Toronto City Council.

The City of Toronto government, along with the Government of Ontario, is focused instead on transit alternatives. The City aims to reduce the need for highways through improvements and additions to the current transit network, as described in the Transit City plan. In April 2009, the province announced that several initiatives of the Transit City plan, including an east–west Eglinton Light Rail line connecting to the airport, would proceed on accelerated construction schedules. The Line 1 subway was extended north to Vaughan and the Eglinton Crosstown LRT line is under construction. It is proposed that Line 1 be extended north to Richmond Hill, Line 2 east to Scarborough City Centre, Line 5 west to Toronto Pearson International Airport and a new line, the Ontario Line, is proposed to serve the core and neighbourhoods in the former North York and East York districts.

Other plans debated during municipal elections have included the development of new toll highways and/or expansion of current expressways through the conversion to tolls. However, toll highways have been seen as politically unpopular, and no politician has made them a part of any election campaign.

== Crosstown Expressway ==
The Crosstown Expressway was a planned east–west expressway through central Toronto. Although it was consistently opposed by the City of Toronto Council, it remained in the Metro Toronto plan until it was cancelled in the aftermath of the cancellation of the Spadina Expressway. In 1964, it was estimated to cost $80 million to build.

The Crosstown was first proposed in the 1940s, and became part of the City of Toronto Official Plan in 1949. The 1949 plan included the Crosstown as the 'north-west arm' of the Don Valley Roadway "system". The highway would have connected to the Ontario Highway 400 at Old Weston Road and St. Clair Avenue. From there it would have proceeded south-easterly between Davenport Road and Dupont Street, before entering the Rosedale Ravine to connect with the main Don Valley roadway south of the Bloor Street Viaduct in the approximate location of today's Rosedale Valley Road and Bayview Avenue intersection. It was estimated to cost $15 million to construct, part of a $179 million plan of development.

As part of the 1959 plan of Metropolitan Toronto, the Expressway would have connected the Highway 400 extension, along an east–west route in the vicinity of Christie Street and Dupont Street, east to the Don Valley Parkway. Highway 400 would have continued south to the Gardiner Expressway. North of Spadina Road, the Spadina Expressway would have connected via an interchange. The expressway would continue east along a CN/CP railway corridor north of Dupont Street to Mount Pleasant Road. East of Mount Pleasant Road, the expressway would have cut through the neighbourhood of Rosedale to connect with the Don Valley Parkway. This section would have been built through ravine parklands.

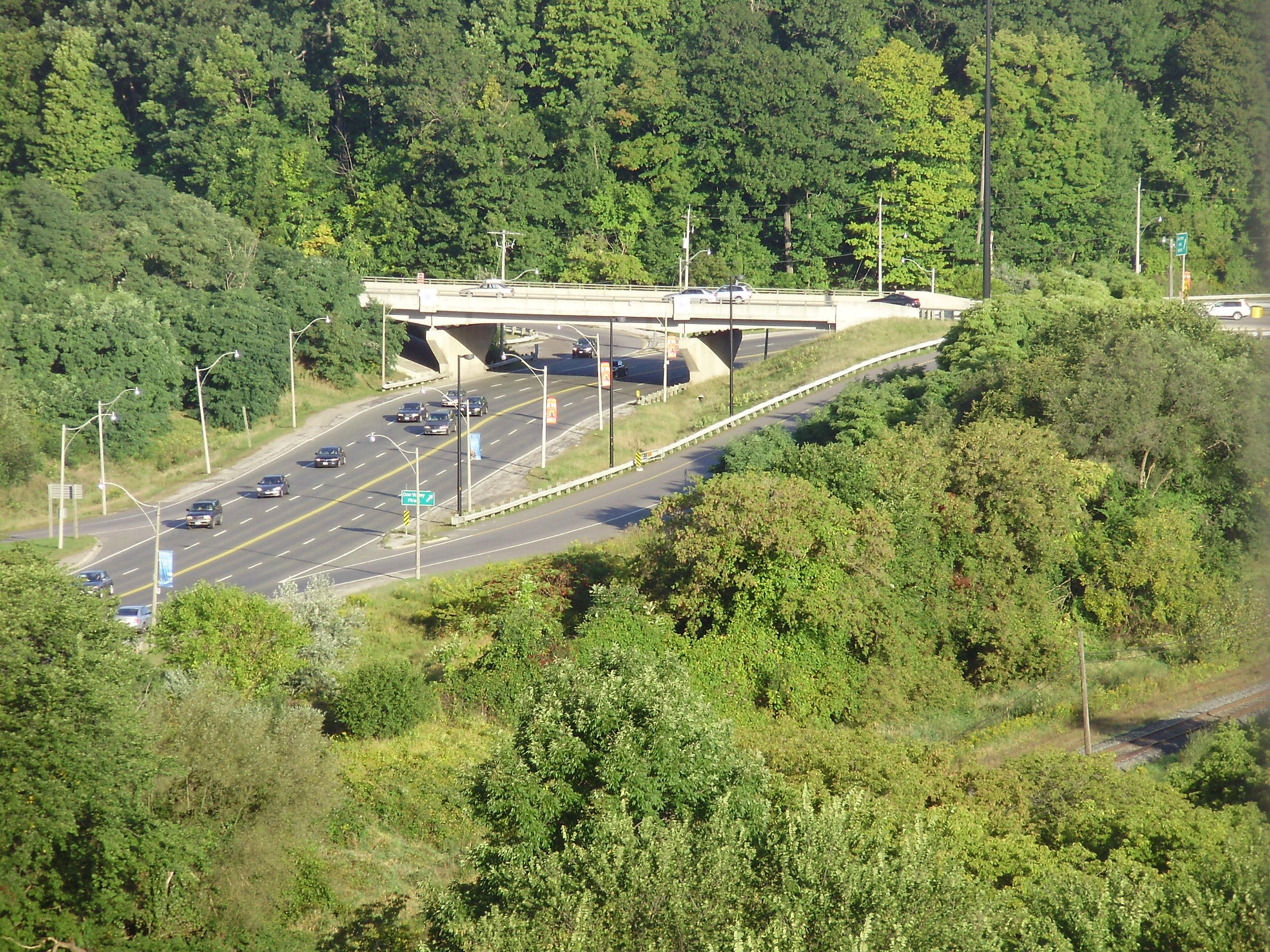
Part of Don Valley Parkway / Bloor off-ramp as it crosses Bayview Avenue in the Don Valley. Looking north along Bayview.

The Crosstown expressway was rejected by Metro Council in December 1961. Almost immediately afterwards, transportation officials lobbied Toronto and Metro Toronto to resurrect the project. In May 1962, Toronto Public Works Commissioner Douglas Ford proposed the construction of the Crosstown, along with an extensive one-way street plan for downtown Toronto. Ford proposed this on the basis that it would be needed to absorb the traffic of the Spadina Expressway and eliminate the need for extensive road widening. He also suggested that the one-way system would preserve residential amenities and encourage development. Ford further stated that it would be folly to terminate the Spadina at other than a controlled-access expressway. Metro Planning Commissioner Murray Jones estimated that 40,000 vehicles would move daily between the Highway 400 extension and the Don Valley Parkway. Metro Traffic Director Samuel Cass suggested that the Crosstown plan would make it unnecessary for heavy traffic to use residential streets in the Rosedale and Moore Park neighbourhoods.

In 1964, Metro Planning Commissioner Eli Comay proposed the extension of Bay Street north of Davenport, to connect with a future Crosstown. Comay publicly criticized the City of Toronto for allowing an apartment development at Davenport and Hillsboro Avenue, in the path of his proposed Bay Street extension. Toronto Controller and future Toronto mayor William Dennison accused Comay of setting Metro policy by himself, as the Crosstown had been rejected. Toronto Board of Control voted to reject Comay and allowed the development to proceed.

Metro Council instructed planners to cease working on the Crosstown proposal twice. Metro Chairman William Allen quipped: "The only way to get the Crosstown out of my mind is to leave the country." The Crosstown reappeared in the 1965 transportation plan developed by Metro's Planning and Transportation Departments and was then approved by Metro Council. The City of Toronto's official plan had no Crosstown Expressway, and the Ontario Minister of Municipal Affairs rejected and rewrote that section of the city's plan to conform with the Metro official plan. The City of Toronto remained consistently opposed to the Crosstown.

=== Interchange with Don Valley Parkway ===
While land was obtained, the expressway was not built, although a short connecting road built to connect the Don Valley Parkway to the Bayview Avenue Extension and Bloor Street would likely have been integrated into the project. When the first section of the Don Valley was opened from Bloor Street to Eglinton Avenue, the roadway was the southern terminus, and is still used as an on/off ramp for the Parkway. Sections of the Parkway south of the road, and north of Eglinton Avenue were opened later. The unnamed roadway is a four-lane arterial road with interchanges at either end. The interchange with the Don Valley is named the 'Chester Hill' interchange.

== East Metro Freeway ==
The East Metro Freeway was a proposed north–south expressway to begin at Highway 401 and east of Morningside Avenue and roughly follow the edge of the Rouge River valley to Highway 407 which itself was under planning at that time. In phase 2, beyond Highway 407, the proposed route was between the Ninth Line and the York-Durham Line in Markham, leading to Stouffville. It was a last priority for the province and construction was not planned to have begun until the Scarborough Expressway was completed. It was not an extension of the Scarborough Expressway as the Scarborough's western terminus would have been 2 kilometres (1.2 mi) west of East Metro's southern terminus.

After the cancellation of the Spadina Expressway, the Scarborough Expressway was put on hold and went into review. Toronto, Metro Toronto, and Ontario had four choices left. Choices two, three, and four included the East Metro Freeway. Choice two was selected. This choice didn't have the Scarborough Expressway. With the Scarborough gone, the East Metro route was less necessary. It also encountered serious opposition from Rouge River naturalist groups. The proposal was officially dropped from planning documents on June 1, 1994.

Part of the route of Donald Cousens Parkway follows the proposed route of the East Metro Freeway namely from 14th Avenue to 16th Avenue, but this arterial road lies entirely within Markham now whereas Metro plans were to terminate in Stouffville.

Markham continues to seek an arterial road connection south to Highway 401. Toronto has not corresponded by rerouting Morningside Road to meet the southern end of Ninth Line at Steeles Avenue. The current plan is to extend Morningside Avenue from McNicoll Avenue to end at Steeles Avenue just east of Tapscott Road using a private right of way and then widening (six lanes) of Steeles from just east of Markham Road to Ninth Line. New traffic lights and wider roadway should eliminate the bottleneck along Steeles to Ninth Line. The direct connection is not possible as it would need to cut across Cedar Brae Golf Club and build on lands close to Rouge River.

== Richview Expressway ==
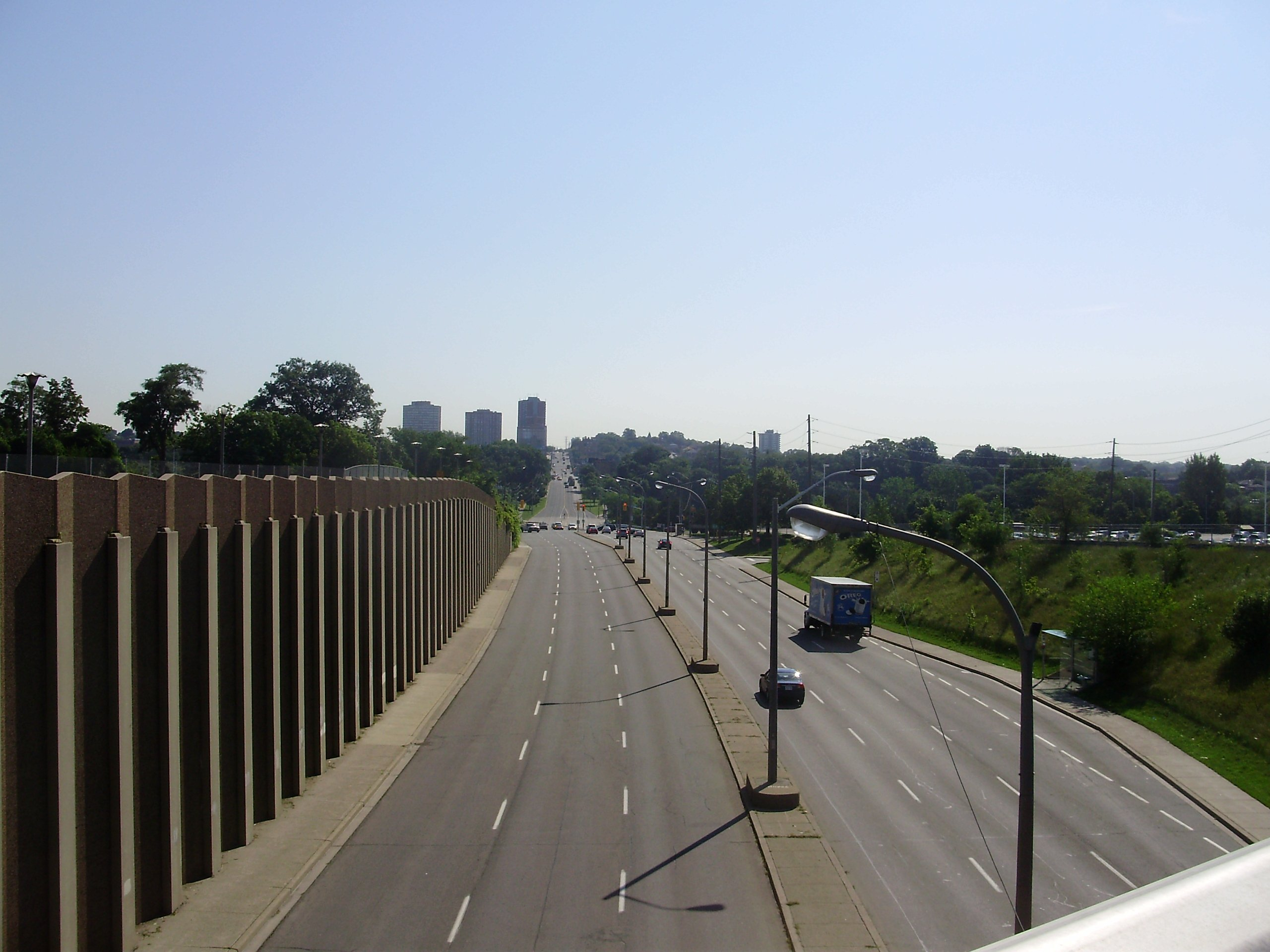
Eglinton Avenue West meets Black Creek Drive in York. This was intended to have been the eastern terminus of the Richview Expressway.

The Richview Expressway was named after the Richview Sideroad, a separate roadway which is today Eglinton Avenue through Etobicoke. It was only partially completed due to concerns of low use and opposition from local residents. Even though the Richview Expressway was never built, it did result in the provision of a wide right-of-way along the Eglinton Avenue corridor (after the Humber River was bridged and the Richview Sideroad designated as part of Eglinton) from Black Creek Drive to Highway 427. The present interchange of Highway 401 and Highway 427 includes several high-speed flyover ramps to and from Eglinton Avenue, which were originally meant for the Richview Expressway.

The Richview Expressway has also been known as the Hamilton Expressway since the original routing for Highway 403 (a highway route for Torontonians to travel to Hamilton) was planned to terminate at the present site of the interchange between Highway 401 and Highway 427. If the original routing of Highway 403 had been carried out, then Metro's Richview Expressway would have been considered a municipal extension of Highway 403. However, the province realigned Highway 403 to turn north and meet Highway 401 at a new junction, which was also designed to accommodate the new Highway 410 to Brampton, while Highway 401 was widened to a collector-express system between Highway 403 to Highway 427. A portion of the right of way (through Mississauga) between Highway 403 and the Richview Expressway was later used for an arterial called Eastgate Parkway which only runs a short distance before curving north and terminating at Eglinton Avenue just west of Mississauga's boundary with Etobicoke, while the rest of the corridor for the Richview remained unbuilt.

Lands allocated for the Richview Expressway were sold off. There are several apartment buildings built on the old right-of-way. The wide right-of-way was revisited in the 2014 Toronto municipal election when John Tory's SmartTrack plan proposed heavy rail within the corridor and challenger Olivia Chow pointed out the existence of the buildings. Tory was elected, but the heavy rail proposal was dropped in 2016 in favour of extending the Eglinton Crosstown LRT project west to the city limits bordering Mississauga.

=== Exit list ===
Although the expressway was never completed, the plans had on/off ramps for:

Location	Interchange	1960s plan	1970s plan
From west to east
Etobicoke	Highway 427		
Etobicoke	Eglinton Avenue West	partial ramps	
Etobicoke	Kipling Avenue	full cloverleaf	cancelled
Etobicoke	Islington Avenue	full cloverleaf	cancelled
Etobicoke	Royal York Road	full cloverleaf	cancelled
York	Scarlett Road	partial cloverleaf	cancelled
York	Jane Street	ramps	cancelled
York	Mount Dennis	full cloverleafs	
York	Highway 400 southern extension	full cloverleafs	

== Scarborough Expressway ==
The Scarborough Expressway (Gardiner Expressway Eastern Extension) was intended to connect the Gardiner Expressway to Highway 401 at the eastern boundary of Toronto, and one segment was built before public opposition stopped the project. Traffic entering Toronto from the east would have travelled directly downtown, as well as serving the south-east area of Toronto. Instead, that traffic is combined with traffic entering from the north along the Don Valley Parkway, where traffic volume significantly exceeds capacity on a daily basis. This has spurred various road advocates to propose new routes to keep the idea alive.

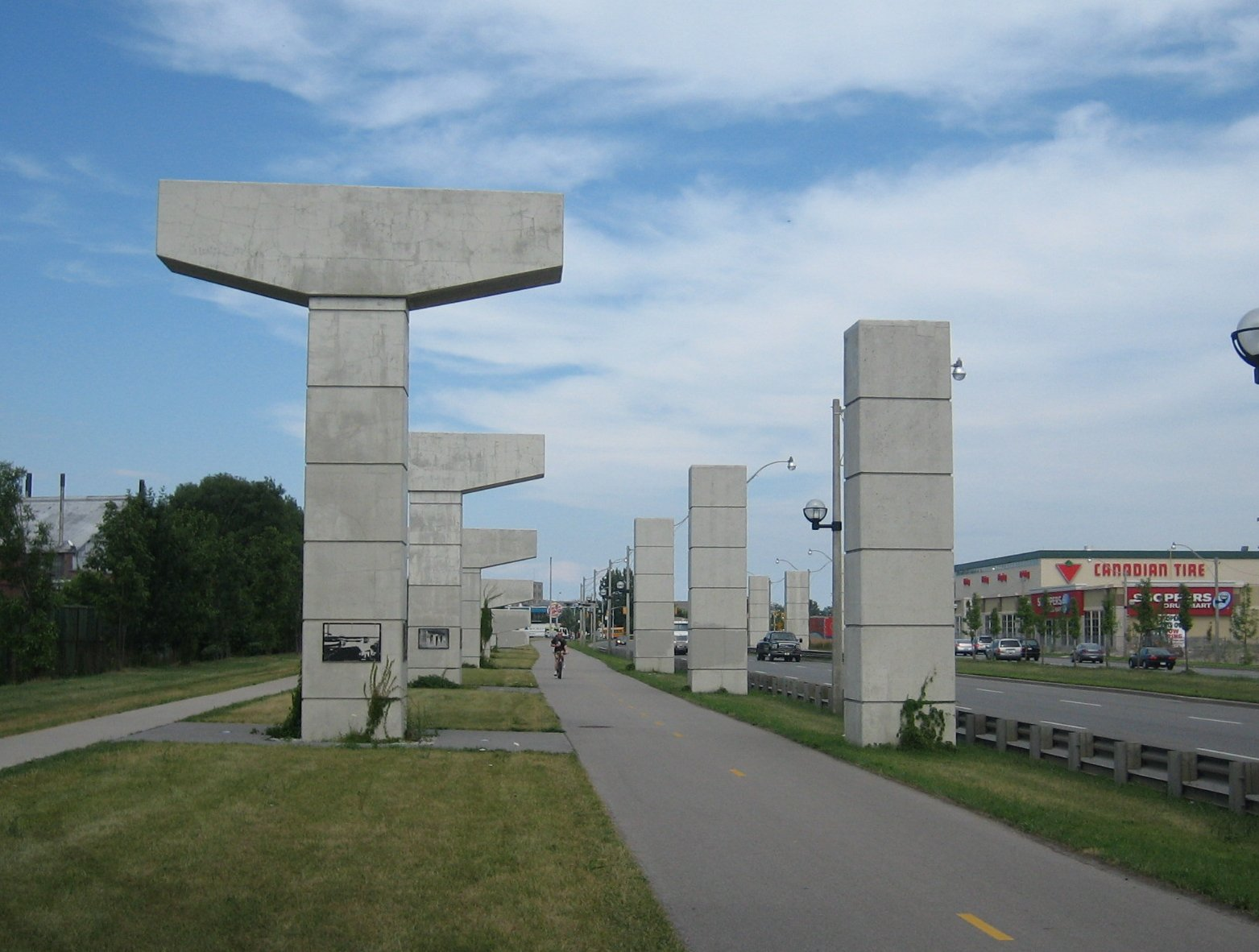
Support pillars from the disassembled Lake Shore portion of the expressway are all that remain of the plan, repurposed by a local artist after the segment was demolished.

The highway was first conceived as part of planning studies in the 1940s, and detailed planning for the new freeway began in 1967. Construction was expected to begin after completion of the Spadina Expressway. Early plans had the road travelling beside the CN route in the southern parts of the then Borough of Scarborough, but later plans were to have the highway continue as an eastern extension of the Gardiner Expressway along the shores of Lake Ontario running along the base of the Scarborough Bluffs, connecting with Highway 401 by incorporating the existing Ontario Highway 2A, a short stub freeway segment that was part of the original 401 alignment.

The original 1967 proposal would have seen 1,200 homes demolished for the expressway. After fierce opposition to this plan, the City of Toronto redesigned the route in 1973. It was moved entirely to within the Lakeshore East CN/GO railway corridor, commencing from the Don Valley Parkway/Gardiner Expressway interchange and would be depressed in a deep ditch. The number of homes to be demolished was reduced to 706. However, this did not pacify east Toronto residents who continued to fight the plan. The City shelved the expressway in 1974.

Property along the road had been bought by Metro Toronto and some infrastructure (namely overpass to accommodate roadway with railway tracks in the centre) was built. However, Metro faced opposition from the residents of the City of Toronto, which caused the road to be severed from the Gardiner Expressway. The fiercest opposition came from eastern Toronto, so this section was deleted. Only a route within Scarborough remained proposed. However, it would have come to an abrupt end at Victoria Park Avenue at the Toronto/Scarborough boundary, potentially flooding east end neighbourhoods with traffic. Local residents continued to fight the plan and appeared before the Ontario Municipal Board to oppose Metro every time it tried to purchase more land for the route. Metro Toronto and Scarborough continued to push for the expressway, renamed as the "Scarborough Transportation Corridor". Along with this corridor, parts of Eglinton Avenue East were considered as a potential arterial highway to relieve Highway 401.

Until the early 1990s, Metro and Scarborough both continued to keep the Scarborough Expressway plan alive, but by 1994 the focus on expressways was no longer a planning priority. By 1996, Metro began to plan for the demolition of the eastern end of the Gardiner Expressway, thus effectively ending the Scarborough Expressway/Scarborough Transportation Corridor. The intended connection to the Gardiner Expressway, between the Don River and Leslie Street, was demolished in 2001 leaving an offramp from the Gardiner Expressway to Carlaw Avenue. In 2021 this offramp to Carlaw was removed to allow for realignment of the ramps between the Gardiner Expressway and the Don Valley Expressway. All that remains of the Scarborough Expressway are concrete pillars that once carried the elevated expressway to Leslie Street.

Much of the land acquired for the expressway route across Scarborough remains vacant, however, the City of Toronto has carried out studies on what to do with the lands. Ideas include local streets, housing projects and public parkland. Bridges along the CN/GO corridor were generally built with room to place two-lanes of road on either side of the railway, these are empty today and allow for future rail upgrades.

In the early 2000s, much of the land east of Manse Road in Scarborough was sold by the post amalgamation City of Toronto for other purposes. The parcel between Kingston Road and Lawrence Avenue was developed into homes, as was a portion of the land south of the railway and east of Poplar Road. A police station, Toronto Police 43 Division, was constructed on a parcel on the south side of Lawrence Avenue.

== Spadina Expressway ==
The Spadina Expressway was a proposed freeway to run from north of Highway 401 into the downtown of Toronto via the Cedarvale and Nordheimer ravines and Spadina Road. It was only partially built before being cancelled in 1971 by the Ontario government due to public opposition. The completed section is known today as Allen Road.

== See also ==
- Municipal expressways in Toronto
