= List of controlled-access highways in Ontario =

The province of Ontario does not have a single unified network of controlled-access highways or freeways. Although most freeways are part of the 400-series highways, which can be characterized by their high design standard, several other sections of provincial highways are also classified as freeways. Additionally, several controlled-access highways, called municipal expressways, are maintained by municipalities rather than the provincial government like provincial highways are.

== Freeways ==
The following is a list of freeways in Ontario as defined by the Official Road Map of Ontario published by the Ministry of Transportation of Ontario (MTO). The MTO defines a freeway as a divided highway with at least two lanes in each direction.

=== 400-series highways ===
All 400-series highways are freeways for their entire length.

- Highway 400 / TCH
- Highway 401
- Highway 402
- Highway 403
- Highway 404
- Highway 405
- Highway 406
- 407 ETR / Highway 407
- Highway 409
- Highway 410
- Highway 412
- Highway 416
- Highway 417 / TCH
- Highway 418
- Highway 420
- Highway 427
- Queen Elizabeth Way

=== Other provincial highways ===
Some non 400-series highways are also freeways for some or all of their length.

Number	From	To	Note	Ref
Highway 4	Colonel Talbot Rd	Wonderland Rd S	Concurrency with Highway 401.	
Highway 6	43.448°N 80.177°W	43.453°N 80.124°W	Concurrency with Highway 401.	
Highway 6	43.230°N 79.971°W	County Road 46 (Brock Rd S)	Concurrency with Highway 403.	
Highway 7	43.392°N 80.666°W	Victoria St N	Sections known as the Conestoga Parkway.	
Highway 7	County Road 28	Lansdowne St E	Concurrency with Highway 115.	
Highway 7 / TCH	45.140°N 76.107°W	Highway 417		
Highway 8	43.392°N 80.666°W	Highway 401	Sections known as the Conestoga Parkway.	
Highway 11	Highway 400	Highway 17		
Highway 17 / TCH	46.377°N 81.347°W	46.425°N 81.113°W		
Highway 35	Highway 115	Highway 401	Concurrency with Highway 115.	
Highway 58	Highway 406	Regional Road 57 (Thorold Stone Rd)		
Highway 69 / TCH	46.429°N 80.895°W	45.945°N 80.582°W		
Highway 85	43.522°N 80.545°W	Highway 7	Part of the Conestoga Parkway.	
Highway 115	Highway 401	Lansdowne St E	Entire length.	
Highway 137	Highway 401	44.367°N 75.985°W		

== Municipal expressways ==
Municipal expressways are expressways not under the jurisdiction of the provincial government. Instead, they are maintained by the municipal governments of the municipalities they are located in. They can vary in size and infrastructure, ranging from major arterial roads (e.g. Cootes Drive, Hamilton) to controlled-access freeways (e.g. Gardiner Expressway, Toronto).

Name	City	From	To	Road Type	Notes	Ref
Airport Parkway	Ottawa	Bronson Ave / Heron Rd	Ottawa Macdonald–Cartier International Airport	Two-lane Expressway	Fully grade-separated, but the highway is undivided and bicycles are permitted.	
Allen Road	Toronto	Transit Rd	Eglinton Ave W	Controlled-access		
Black Creek Drive	Toronto	Highway 400	Eglinton Ave W	Limited-access	No interchanges. Pedestrians are prohibited.	
Cootes Drive (City Road 8)	Hamilton	City Road 99 (Dundas St)	Main St W	Arterial Road	First divided dual-carriageway road built in Canada.	
Don Valley Parkway	Toronto	Highway 401 / Highway 404	Gardiner Expressway	Controlled-access	Entire length.	
Dougall Parkway	Windsor	Highway 401	42.252°N 83.000°W	Controlled-access	Entire length.	
E. C. Row Expressway	Windsor	Ojibway Pkwy	42.306°N 82.888°W	Controlled-access	Entire length.	
Gardiner Expressway	Toronto	Don Valley Parkway	Highway 427 / Queen Elizabeth Way	Controlled-access	Entire length. Parts were formerly Queen Elizabeth Way. Formerly signed Highway 2.	
Harbour Expressway	Thunder Bay	Highway 11 / Highway 17 / Highway 61 / TCH (Collectively Thunder Bay Expressway)	Fort William Rd	Limited-access	No pedestrians or bicycles permitted. One at-grade railway crossing between Memorial Avenue and Fort William Road.	
Highbury Avenue	London	Highway 401	Power Street	Controlled-access		
Highway 2A	Toronto	43.782°N 79.169°W	Highway 401	Controlled-access	Entire length. Formerly provincial Highway 2A.	
Highway 7	York Region	Centre Street	Bayview Avenue	Limited-access	Formerly a part of Highway 7. Has Viva Rapidway between the roadway	
Lincoln M. Alexander Parkway	Hamilton	Highway 403	Red Hill Valley Parkway	Controlled-access	Entire length.	
Maley Drive	Greater Sudbury	46.515°N 81.006°W	46.537°N 80.929°W	Varies	A few interchanges throughout the road.	
Mount Pleasant Road	Toronto	Inglewood Dr	Jarvis St	Arterial Road	Considered to be the first expressway in Toronto.	
Nikola Tesla Boulevard	Hamilton	43.260°N 79.810°W	Queen Elizabeth Way	Controlled-access	Entire length.	
Ottawa Road 174	Ottawa	Highway 417	45.502°N 75.477°W	Controlled-access	Entire length.	
Red Hill Valley Parkway	Hamilton	Lincoln M. Alexander Parkway	Queen Elizabeth Way	Controlled-access	Entire length.	
Veterans Memorial Parkway	London	Clarke Rd	Highway 401	Limited-access	No interchanges. However, continues north as Clarke Road	

== Other limited-access provincial highways ==
Name	City	From	To	Notes	Ref
Hanlon Expressway (Highway 6 / Highway 7)	Guelph	Woodlawn Rd W	Highway 401	A few interchanges throughout the road. Planned to be upgraded to a fully controlled-access highway.	
Thunder Bay Expressway (Highway 11 / Highway 17 / Highway 61) / TCH	Thunder Bay	Hodder Ave	Arthur St W	Undivided limited-access highway. Planned for twinning and upgrade to full freeway.	
Southwest Bypass (Highway 17) / TCH	Greater Sudbury	46.425°N 81.113°W	Highway 69 / TCH	Undivided with a few interchanges throughout the road.	
Highway 26	Clearview	44.487°N 80.173°W	44.461°N 80.112°W		

== Future plans ==
Name	From	To	Notes	Ref
Bradford Bypass	Highway 400	Highway 404	Entire length.	
Highway 6	Highway 401	Maddaugh Road	See Ontario Highway 6 > Future.	
Highway 7	Kitchener	Guelph	See Ontario Highway 7 > Proposed Kitchener–Guelph freeway.	
Highway 69	45.945°N 80.582°W	Highway 400	See Ontario Highway 69 > Four-laning.	
Highway 413	Highway 401 / 407 ETR	Highway 400	Entire length.	

== Cancelled plans ==
- Cancelled expressways in Toronto
- Mid-Peninsula Highway

== See also ==
- National Capital Commission#Ottawa parkways
- List of Ontario provincial highways
