= Lincoln M. Alexander Parkway =

Municipal freeway in Hamilton, Ontario

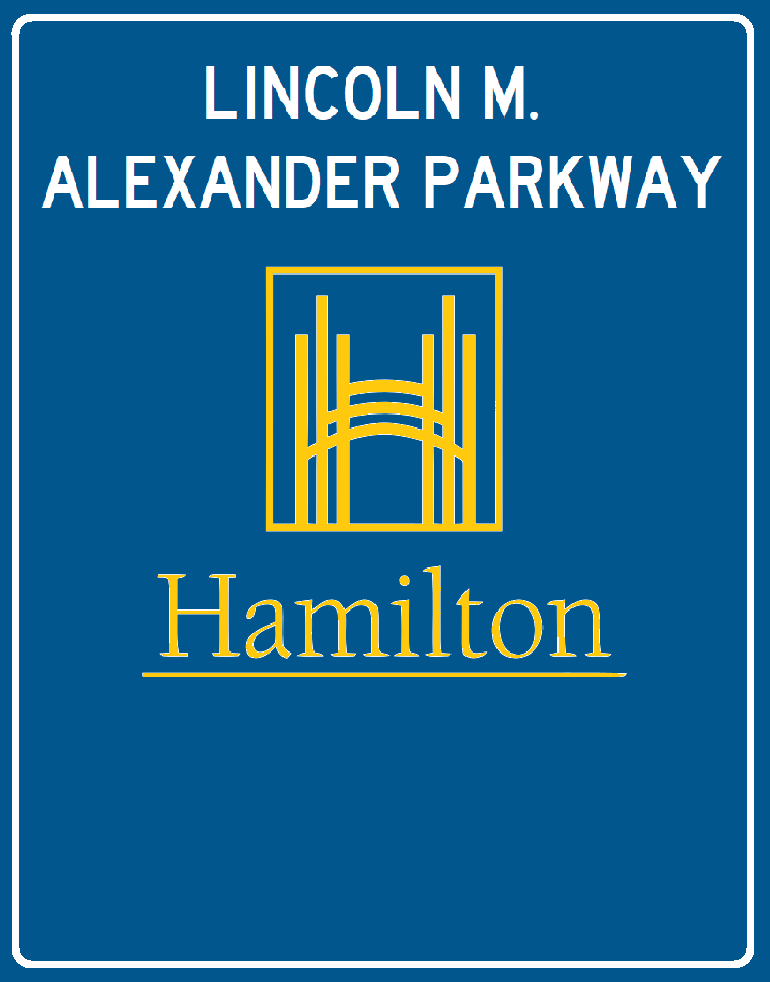
Lincoln M. Alexander Parkway
- "The Linc"
- Lincoln M. Alexander Parkway highlighted in red

Route information
- Maintained by City of Hamilton
- Length: 12.5 km (7.8 mi)
- History: Planned 1963; Constructed 1991–97; Opened October 15, 1997

Major junctions
- West end: Highway 403 (continues as Mohawk Road)
- East end: Dartnall Road (continues as the Red Hill Valley Parkway)

Location
- Country: Canada
- Province: Ontario
- Major cities: Hamilton

Highway system
- Ontario municipal expressways
(in alphabetical order)
← Highway 2A	Lincoln M. Alexander Parkway	Nikola Tesla Boulevard →

The Lincoln M. Alexander Parkway, nicknamed The Linc, is a municipal expressway in the city of Hamilton, Ontario, Canada, which connects Highway 403 with the Red Hill Valley Parkway, which continues north to the Queen Elizabeth Way (QEW). Collectively, the two expressways form a southern and eastern bypass of Hamilton. Located on the Hamilton mountain, atop the Niagara Escarpment, the freeway was named after the former Progressive Conservative MP and first black Lieutenant Governor of Ontario, Lincoln Alexander in July 1997, despite him never holding a driver's license.

Although planning for the Red Hill Creek Expressway began in 1963, construction did not begin until 1991, by which point the project had become a contentious issue. The province agreed to split the cost for the east–west portion of the planned expressway, but opposed the north–south link. Nevertheless, construction continued throughout the mid-1990s, and the expressway opened on October 15, 1997, just over a decade before the controversial Red Hill Valley Parkway, which opened on November 17, 2007. The speed limit along the parkway is 90 kilometres per hour (56 mph).

== Route description ==
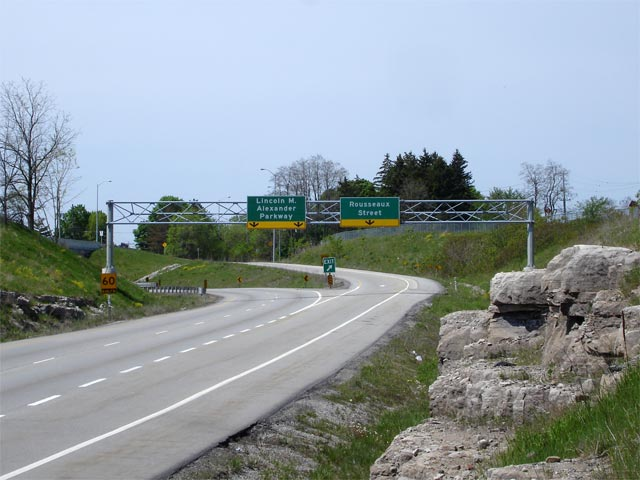
Signage on the ramp leading from Highway 403 to the Linc

The Lincoln M. Alexander Parkway begins in the west end of Hamilton at a large turbine interchange with Highway 403, which also provides access to Rousseaux Street (formerly the westernmost part of Mohawk Road) from westbound Highway 403 and The Linc. Travelling southeast, the expressway descends into a ditch, which it travels along throughout most of its length. It passes north of the Meadowlands Centre mall and the interchanges with Mohawk Road / Golf Links Road. The route then becomes sandwiched between residential subdivisions at Upper Horning Road, which was bisected by construction of the route. The route continues, passing beneath a pedestrian overpass and Upper Paradise Road before interchanging with Garth Street.

Between Garth Street and Upper Ottawa Street, Limeridge Road — a concession road bisected by interchanges at Upper James Street, Upper Wentworth Street and Upper Gage Avenue — travels parallel to the parkway approximately 200 metres (660 ft) to the north. The route passes beneath another pedestrian bridge and West 5th Street then interchanges with Upper James Street (former Highway 6). It continues, with Upper Wellington Street crossing the parkway before an interchange with Upper Wentworth Street. On the northeast corner of this interchange is Lime Ridge Mall, while Thomas B. McQuesten Park lies on the southeast corner. East of these, the route once again lies between subdivisions, with Upper Sherman Avenue crossing the freeway midway to the interchange with Upper Gage Avenue.

Beyond the Upper Ottawa Street crossing, residential developments are confined to the north side of the Linc as it curves southward, descending towards the top of the Red Hill Valley. Surrounded by undeveloped land, it meets the northern end of Dartnall Road at a trumpet interchange, with Mt. Albion Conservation Area to the southeast and the Red Hill Creek passing beneath the interchange to traverse the Niagara Escarpment at Albion Falls. The Linc gradually curves back northeast, now surrounded, passing under Pritchard Road. Immediately east of there, the Mud Street interchange branches off as the route curves northward and becomes the Red Hill Valley Parkway, which descends the escarpment towards the QEW.

== History ==
The parkway was one of two phases to build an expressway bypass on the south side of Hamilton. Despite this, plans for both The Linc as well as the Red Hill Valley Parkway appeared simultaneously in 1963, when Hamilton City Council approved the 'Hamilton Area Transportation Study' which included the Highway 53 Freeway as one of five proposed expressways. These were subsequently added to the city's official plan in 1964. However, political change and shifting public attitudes would soon reject the idea of inner-city expressways, instead shifting the focus to public transportation. The cancellation of the Spadina Expressway in Toronto was the turning point in this shift.

It would take until 1982 before serious consideration was given to any expressway plan. While most of the planned 1963 routes had vanished from the drawing board, a north–south link through the Red Hill Valley Creek and an east–west route along the brow of the escarpment remained in place. An environmental assessment of both links began and was approved in 1985. However, expressway opponents launched an appeal to the provincial cabinet. This appeal was rejected in 1987, and engineering began. Preliminary designs were submitted to the Regional Municipality of Hamilton–Wentworth and approved in April 1990. Construction began immediately on structures to carry three routes (two road and one rail) over the future Red Hill Valley Parkway.

However, the election of the NDP government in September 1990 — with representatives who had all been vocally opposed to the expressway since the late 1970s winning all six Hamilton-area seats — provincial funding was pulled from the north–south portion of the project in December. Despite this, construction began on the east–west expressway in 1991 under a 50/50 cost-sharing agreement while the City of Hamilton attempted to sue the provincial government for the reinstatement of funding for the north–south portion. In April 1992, work began on overpasses at Upper Paradise Road and Upper Sherman Avenue. This was followed in late 1993 by a project to link Mohawk Road and Golf Links Road along with an interchange to connect the two with Highway 403 at the former Mohawk Road interchange, which would become the connection point for the future expressway. As part of this project, Stone Church Road was extended west from Upper Horning Road to Golf Links Road. Work continued on the new expressway over the next several years, wrapping up in mid-1997. By then, a new Progressive Conservative government was in power, and committed $100 million towards the two projects. An opening ceremony was held on October 5, 1997, with local, regional and provincial politicians in attendance. The new expressway opened to vehicular traffic ten days later on October 15. The cost of the parkway, initially projected at $187 million, was under budget at $180 million.

The expressway was named after the former Progressive Conservative MP, first black Lieutenant Governor of Ontario, and first black lawyer in Hamilton, Lincoln Alexander, despite him never holding a driver's license of his own. Hamilton city council voted unanimously on July 16, 1997 to name the east–west portion of the bypass, until then known as the Red Hill Creek Expressway, after Alexander, an honour happily endorsed by the former MP; the official nickname was adopted as part of this vote. He would later appear with his family alongside premier Mike Harris at the ribbon-cutting ceremony for the parkway on October 5.

At the time of completion, the Linc ended at Dartnall Road. On June 5, 1999, an extension to connect with Mud Street was opened, designed to fit within the future interchange with the Red Hill Valley Parkway. The extension became prone to accidents over the following years, prompting the addition of safety features along the extended ramps. The interchange with Highway 403 also initially remained unmodified from the design constructed in 1969, with access between westbound Highway 403 and eastbound on the parkway being provided by a loop ramp and access between westbound on the parkway and westbound Highway 403 requiring a left turn at a traffic light. This issue, which became a serious bottleneck when traffic on the new expressway greatly exceeded expectations, was remedied beginning in 2001 with the construction of two flyovers to replace the problematic movements and the removal of the under-utilized connection from eastbound Mohawk Road to westbound Highway 403. The $16 million project was completed in late 2002.

In June 2014, the City of Hamilton modified the eastern terminus of the Linc from west of Dartnall Road to the interchange with the Red Hill Valley Parkway and Mud Street.

== Exit list ==
The following table lists the major junctions along Lincoln M. Alexander Parkway. The entire route is located in Hamilton. All exits are unnumbered.

km	mi	Destinations	Notes
0.0	0.0	Rousseaux Street	
0.4	0.25	Highway 403 – Brantford, Hamilton International Airport, Toronto	
1.7	1.1	City Road 260 south (Golf Links Road); Mohawk Road (Hamilton Road 260) north	
4.2	2.6	Garth Street	
5.9	3.7	Upper James Street	
7.6	4.7	Upper Wentworth Street	
9.2	5.7	Upper Gage Avenue	
11.3	7.0	Dartnall Road	
12.5	7.8	Stone Church Road East; Mud Street	
12.5	7.8	Red Hill Valley Parkway north	Continuation beyond eastern terminus
1.000 mi = 1.609 km; 1.000 km = 0.621 mi: Route transition
