= Black Creek Drive =

Toronto municipal expressway

- 400 Extension
- A map of Black Creek Drive
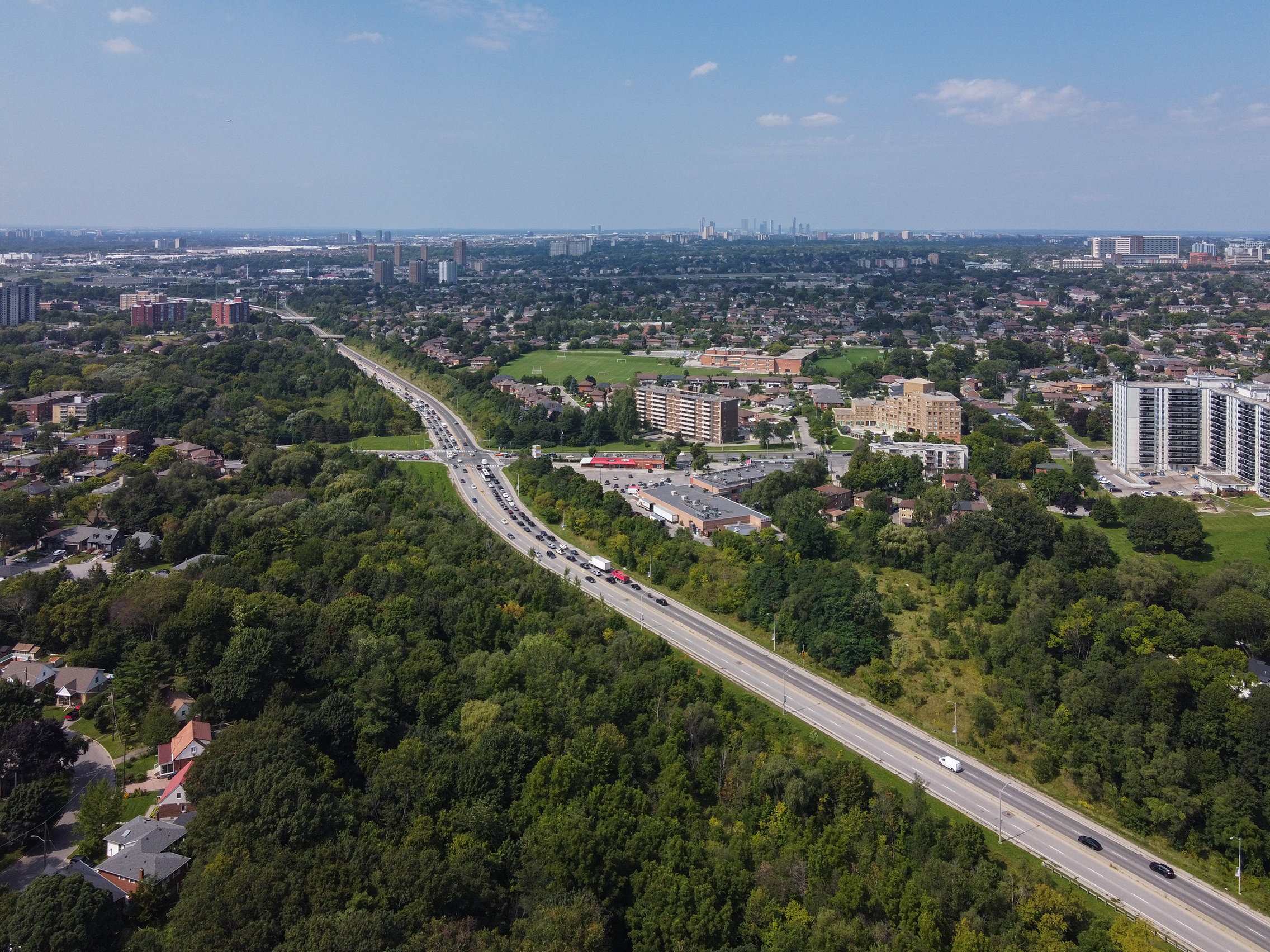

Route information
- Maintained by City of Toronto
- Length: 3.5 km (2.2 mi)
- Existed: 1982–present

Major junctions
- South end: Weston Road
- Eglinton Avenue West; Trethewey Drive; Lawrence Avenue West
- North end: Highway 400 (continues north as)

Location
- Country: Canada
- Province: Ontario
- Major cities: Toronto

Highway system
- Roads in Ontario
Nearby arterial roads in Toronto
← Jane Street	Keele Street →
Ontario municipal expressways
(in alphabetical order)
← Allen Road	Black Creek Drive	Don Valley Parkway →

Black Creek Drive is a limited-access arterial road in Toronto, Ontario, Canada. A four-lane route that runs north–south, it connects Weston Road and Humber Boulevard with Highway 401 via Highway 400, the latter of which it forms a southerly extension. Black Creek Drive officially transitions into Highway 400 at the Maple Leaf Drive overpass, southeast of the Jane Street interchange. The roadway is named after the Black Creek ravine, which it parallels for most of its route. It features a maximum speed limit of 70 km/h (43 mph).

The Province of Ontario and Metropolitan Toronto sought to build the Highway 400 south extension to reach the Gardiner Expressway, but encountered public opposition to building freeways into central Toronto. As a compromise, the province constructed the route as a limited controlled-access expressway with at-grade intersections and transferred it to the municipality upon completion.

== Route description ==
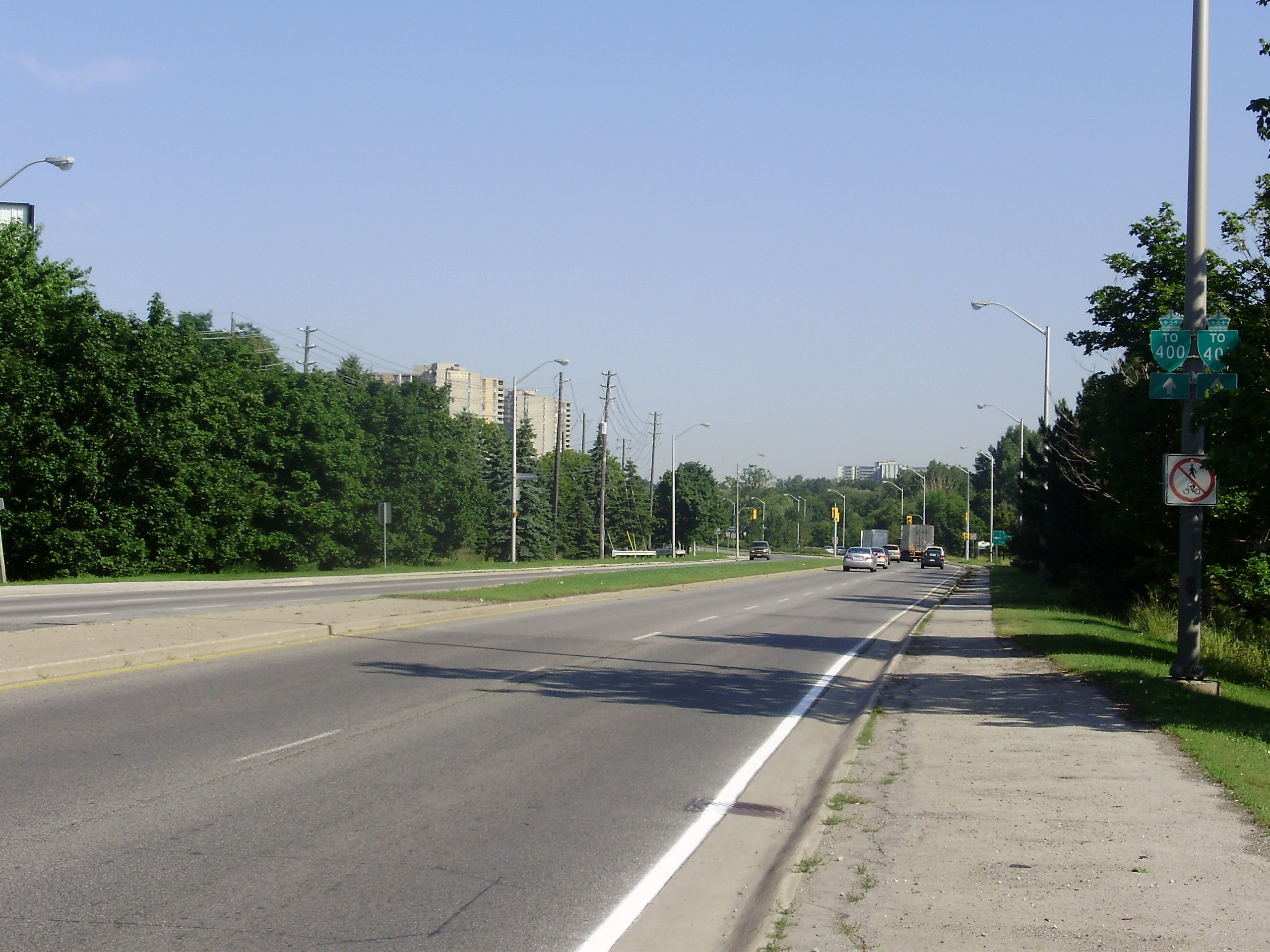
Black Creek Drive north of Eglinton Avenue West

At its south end, Black Creek Drive begins at an intersection with Weston Road and Humber Boulevard, in the Mount Dennis neighbourhood of Toronto. The four-lane road passes beneath railway tracks that carry the Kitchener GO Line and Union Pearson Express rail corridors. It travels north alongside Black Creek, from which it takes its name; Keelesdale Park lies to the east. The road continues north–northwest, intersecting Eglinton Avenue West. Coronation Park and Trethewey Park occupy the eastern side of the road north of Eglinton, while the western side is occupied by commercial and industrial uses. Much of this land was a former Kodak plant, marked today only by the existence of Photography Drive. Between Trethewey Drive and Lawrence Avenue West, the road passes between residential subdivisions within the Black Creek ravine. North of Lawrence, the road diverges from the Black Creek ravine. The road is separated at-grade from Queens Drive and Maple Leaf Drive, both of whom cross overhead.

After Maple Leaf Drive overpass, the route becomes the provincial Highway 400 and thereafter falls under the control of the Ministry of Transportation of Ontario, including the interchange with Jane Street. The segment between Maple Leaf Drive and Jane Street, including the bridges crossing Black Creek and the ramps to/from Jane Street, were built as part of the Black Creek Drive project. South of Highway 401, all on-ramps to the southbound lanes of Highway 400 are signed as Black Creek Drive (without reference to Highway 400) even though Highway 400 continues until Maple Leaf Drive.

The road has signalized intersections at Photography Drive, Eglinton Avenue West, Todd Baylis Boulevard, Trethewey Drive and Lawrence Avenue West. From Trethewey north, the two directions are separated by an 81 cm (32 inches) tall Jersey barrier, and north of Lawrence, the directions are separated by a set of steel guard rails. South of Trethewey, the two directions are separated by a grass median. The speed limit is 70 km/h (43 mph) for the route's entire length. Although the city classifies it as an arterial road (Google Maps also colour-codes it as an arterial unlike other expressways with at-grade crossings like Highway 7 (York Regional Road 7) between Centre Street and Bayview Avenue in nearby York Region), the section north of Eglinton Avenue fits the definition of a limited controlled-access expressway since bicycles and pedestrians are banned from using the roadway or paved shoulders.

== History ==
Black Creek Drive forms the southerly extension to Highway 400, and was originally intended as part of a proposed freeway that would have connected Highway 401 with the Gardiner Expressway, via the Crosstown Expressway. A piece of a larger plan to expand a network of expressways across Toronto, the route was instead completed as a compromise between Metropolitan Toronto and the provincial government, as part of the larger Spadina Expressway controversy. The goal of Metro Toronto was to establish a network of expressways across and into Toronto, including the Crosstown Expressway north of Dupont Street, and the Richview Expressway along Eglinton Avenue West. Plans were conceived to extend Highway 400 south from Highway 401 to Eglinton Avenue, where it would join those two new expressways. These plans would never reach fruition, as public opposition to urban expressways cancelled most highway construction in Toronto by 1971.

The proposed route of the Highway 400 extension would have followed Weston Road as well as the right-of-way of the Canadian Pacific Railway, then east along Dupont Street to connect with the Crosstown Expressway at present-day Christie Street. From there it would branch southward along Christie and Clinton Streets to the Gardiner Expressway. Alternate alignments included one following Parkside Drive south to the Gardiner, and one following the Canadian National Railway tracks south to Front Street and the Gardiner Expressway.

The provincial government began construction of an extension of Highway 400 as far south as Jane Street in 1965, which was completed and opened on October 28, 1966, while the remainder of the plans were shelved following the cancellation of the Spadina Expressway in 1971. The provincial government still owned the right-of-way along the Black Creek Valley and agreed to construct it as a four-lane expressway with at-grade intersections (labelled as an arterial road for political convenience), instead of six-lane freeway with grade-separations. The Metro Toronto government agreed to extend it farther south to St. Clair Avenue.

Fresh from battling the Spadina Expressway, anti-Spadina groups started battling the extension and soon, Parkdale residents joined in the debate, fearing an extension would pass directly through their neighbourhood. Additionally, the City of Toronto objected to the construction of the road south to St. Clair Avenue. A compromise was reached at Weston Road; the 400 Extension would end there, but Weston Road would be widened to support the flow of traffic from Black Creek Drive. Construction began in late 1977.

Black Creek Drive opened in 1982 from Jane Street south to Weston Road. On March 1, 1983, Metro Council performed a land transfer in which the right-of-way for the Spadina Expressway south of Eglinton was given to the City of Toronto (which effectively blocked any southward extension of the Spadina Expressway) in exchange for Black Creek Drive being transferred to Metro. Had this not been done voluntarily then the province would have seized the Spadina right-of-way and billed Metro for the cost of Black Creek Drive.

In 1989, Metro Toronto initiated a study of the extension of Black Creek Drive south to the Gardiner Expressway. The Canadian Automobile Association has noted that the route operates inefficiently in its present form as a super-4 expressway and advocated upgrading the route to a freeway, by utilizing the corridor's right-of-way to widen it to six lanes and reconstruct the at-grade intersections to interchanges.

== Major intersections ==
The following table lists intersections along Black Creek Drive. The entire route is located within Toronto.

Location	km	mi	Destinations	Notes
Mount Dennis / Silverthorn	0.0	0.0	Weston Road / Humber Boulevard	
Mount Dennis / Silverthorn	0.3	0.19	Photography Drive	
Mount Dennis / Silverthorn	0.6	0.37	Eglinton Avenue West	
Mount Dennis / Silverthorn	0.9	0.56	Todd Baylis Boulevard	
Amesbury	1.3	0.81	Trethewey Drive	
Maple Leaf	2.7	1.7	Lawrence Avenue West	
Maple Leaf	3.5	2.2	Maple Leaf Drive	Grade-separated overpass; Black Creek Drive continues north as Highway 400
1.000 mi = 1.609 km; 1.000 km = 0.621 mi

== See also ==
- Cancelled expressways in Toronto
