= Red Hill Valley Parkway =

Municipal freeway in Hamilton, Ontario

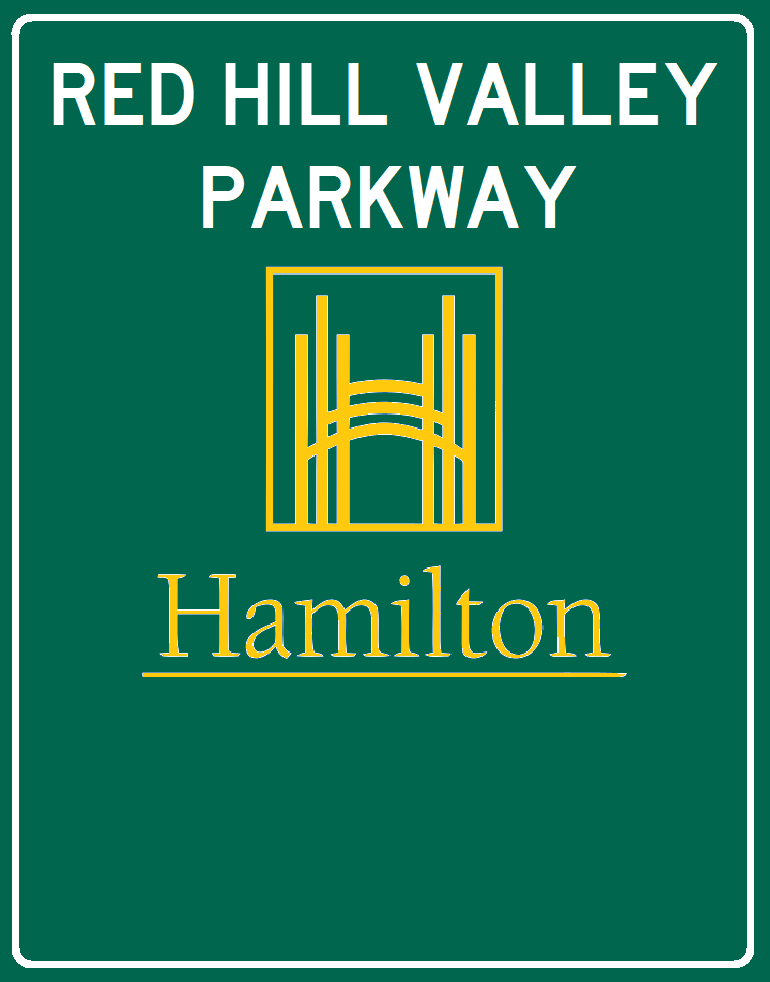
Red Hill Valley Parkway
- Red Hill Valley Parkway highlighted in red

Route information
- Maintained by City of Hamilton
- Length: 6 km (3.7 mi)
- History: Proposed during 1956, Opened November 17, 2007 Extended September 2017 (Upper Red Hill Valley Parkway)

Major junctions
- South end: Rymal Road (Upper Red Hill Valley Parkway) Dartnall Road (Red Hill Valley Parkway)
- King Street
- North end: Queen Elizabeth Way

Location
- Country: Canada
- Province: Ontario
- Major cities: Hamilton

Highway system
- Ontario municipal expressways
(in alphabetical order)
| ← Ottawa Road 174 | Red Hill Valley Parkway | Veterans Memorial Parkway → |

The Red Hill Valley Parkway (RHVP) is a municipal expressway in the Canadian city of Hamilton, Ontario. The route connects the Lincoln M. Alexander Parkway, Hamilton's first municipal expressway, to the Queen Elizabeth Way (QEW) near Hamilton Harbour. It is named after Red Hill Valley, through which it descends the Niagara Escarpment. It is a seven-kilometre (4.3 mi) four-lane freeway with a speed limit of 80 kilometres per hour (50 mph).

The $245 million freeway was built through the Red Hill Valley by the City of Hamilton after a decades-long battle with opponents. The freeway was first proposed as the Red Creek Expressway in the 1950s and was cancelled and resurrected several times. Last-ditch efforts by opponents, including occupying the valley, lawsuits and blocking construction access, failed and the expressway was finally constructed in the 2000s, opening to traffic in 2007. The cost to the city included $100 million in construction costs, plus legal costs fighting to get the expressway constructed. The city fought the provincial government once and the federal government twice to build the project. As of November 2009, a $75 million lawsuit is still pending with the federal government.

== Route description ==
The parkway begins by descending the Niagara Escarpment, heading north towards the Queen Elizabeth Way

The expressway begins at the QEW. Proceeding southbound, the Creek and a stormwater pond can be seen on the right. From the QEW interchange to Barton Street, the expressway crosses over the creek several times with industrial lands to the south and industrial lands on the north as far as the Canadian National Railway rail lines. This area's trees were removed from this area as part of the project; there are some remaining trees on both sides of the expressway at Barton Street.

This section, which is not far above the water level of Lake Ontario, is prone to flooding. On July 26, 2009, sections of the expressway at the QEW were closed due to flooding of the Red Hill Creek after a thunderstorm. On July 7, 2010, sections of the expressway at Barton Street were closed due to flooding of the Red Hill Creek after a thunderstorm.

From Barton Street, the expressway travels along the creek, which is visible on the right. Both sides of the highway are residential lands, and the slopes of the valley have some forestation as far south as Queenston, where the valley sides were cleared of trees and landscaped for the interchange, with sound barriers on the top of the slopes. South of Queenston Road, the expressway passes through a forested part of the valley, and the road cut through the trees is narrower, as far south as King Street, where the valley was cleared and landscaped for the interchange, King Street and Mount Albion Streets.

South of King Street, the creek is visible on the west side, as far south as the rail lines. Past the Canadian Pacific Railway rail lines, the creek diverges west into Rosedale Park, while the expressway hugs the east side of the valley. On the east side of the valley at this point is Red Hill and the Red Hill residential area is isolated from the expressway by a noise barrier.

Greenhill Avenue, from the east, was extended to the expressway. The area of the Greenhill interchange was a forested part of the valley, and is now a grassy area around the expressway and interchange. South of Greenhill, the expressway enters King's Forest park. The expressway stays along the east side of the valley, while on the west side is the King's Forest Golf Course. The expressway ascends the Niagara Escarpment along a viaduct through a rock cut. At the interchange with Mud Street and Stone Church Road, the route changes direction from south to west. After crossing under the Pritchard Road overpass (that serves as the demarcation line) the route continues as the Lincoln Alexander.

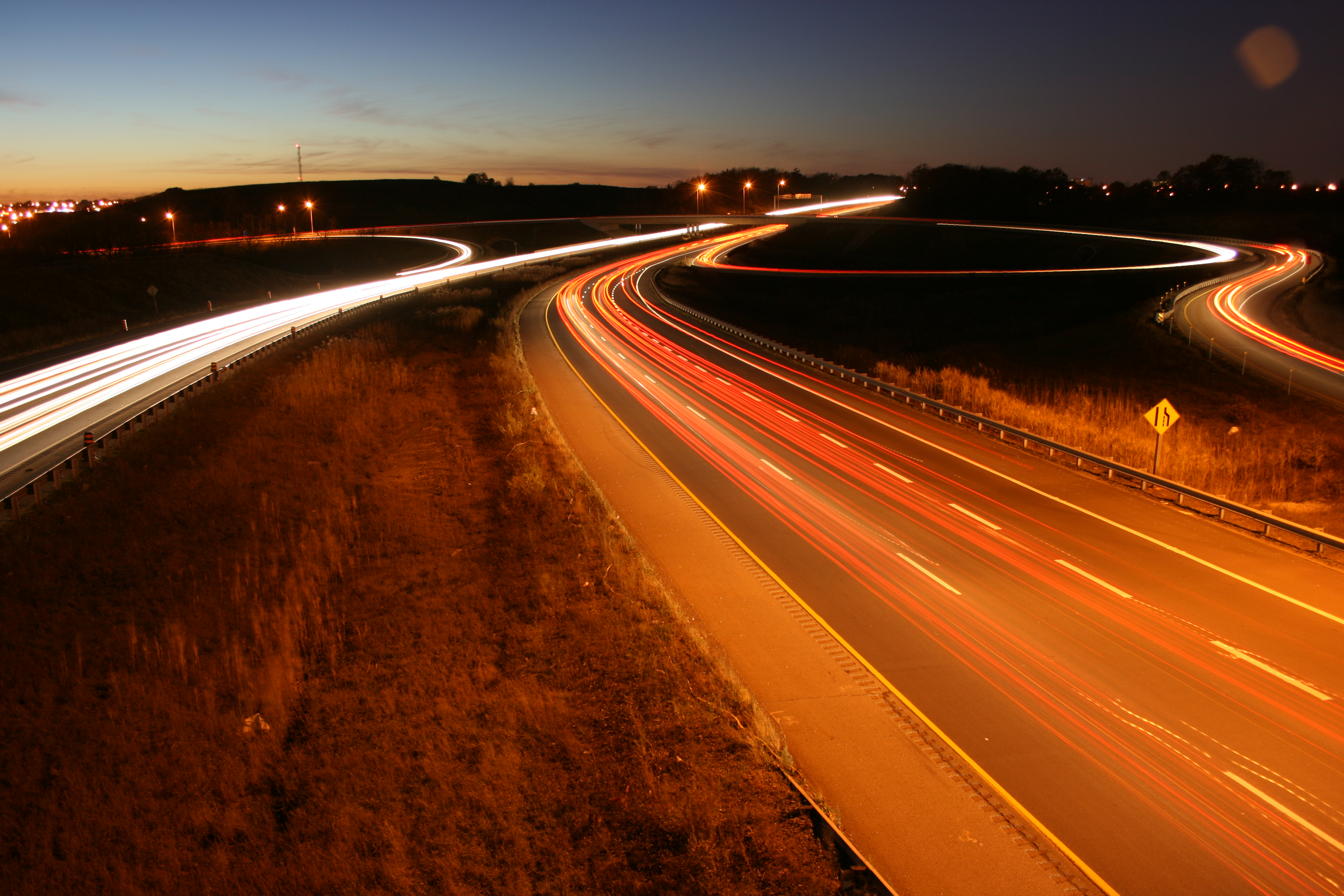
The Red Hill Valley Parkway near the Lincoln M. Alexander Parkway interchange

From the QEW to Greenhill Avenue, the highway is two lanes in either direction. From Greenhill to the Lincoln Alexander, the highway is three lanes southbound (uphill) and two lanes northbound (downhill). The northbound and southbound lanes are separated by guard-rails and a grass median.

== History ==
=== Planning ===
Referred to as the Red Hill Creek Expressway during planning, the expressway was first proposed in the 1950s. Hamilton first voted to put a highway through the valley in 1954. A consultancy hired by the City of Hamilton produced a plan to build an expressway within the valley in 1956.

Construction was not approved, and the plan to build an expressway was not revisited until 1963, when Hamilton City Council approved the Hamilton Area Transportation Study which includes the Red Hill Expressway as one of five proposed expressways. The RHVP was added to the city's official plan. Opposition to the project developed during the 1960s and early 1970s. In 1974, the expressway was removed from the city and regional governments' official plans.

The RHVP project did not remain dead for long. City council voted three further times against the project before voting in favour of a Red Hill Valley route in 1977. The city was planning an east–west expressway in lower Hamilton, which required a subsidy from the provincial government. The provincial government refused to pay the subsidy without the city proposing to build the Red Hill.

=== Controversy ===
A plan for the expressway was approved by regional council in 1979. The project required approvals from various boards: the Ontario Municipal Board (OMB), Ontario Environmental Assessment Board (OEAB), Niagara Escarpment Commission (NEC) and the Hamilton Region Conservation Authority (HRCA). The provincial government decided to submit approval for the project to one, larger hearing process, called the Consolidated Joint Board which had two OMB officials and one OEAB official. There were 99 days of hearing held in 1984. The OEAB, NEC and HRCA all opposed the project. Against the wishes of those agencies, and a group called "Save the Valley", the board approved the project 2–1 (the OEAB representative dissented) in October 1985.

The Save the Valley organization and the HRCA appealed to the provincial government, hoping for a cancellation like the Spadina Expressway in Toronto, but the appeal was rejected in 1987. Construction began in 1990, but was stopped by the election of the Ontario New Democratic Party (NDP) government of Bob Rae. NDP MPPs had won all six ridings in the Hamilton area and had opposed the project as a matter of party policy. The Rae government withdrew funding for the project. Construction on both the King Street East and Queenston Road replacement bridges had already been completed.

Hamilton-Wentworth Regional Council started a legal action in 1991 to get the funding reinstated, but was unsuccessful. Former Toronto mayor David Crombie was appointed by the Rae government to mediate the dispute. Crombie had been a strong opponent of municipal expressways while mayor of Toronto, so his appointment was seen as a means for Rae to kill the project. Saying that an expressway was not needed, Crombie suggested that "all foreseeable traffic needs could be met by adding two lanes to an existing escarpment crossing (Mt. Albion) and linking this to an existing four-lane road (Woodward Avenue)". Crombie's proposal, while acceptable to anti-expressway activists, was rejected by regional council which maintained that arterials were unsuitable for the high volume of trucks and would be unable to handle the long-term growth in traffic. In 1995, the Progressive Conservatives led by Mike Harris won the provincial election. The Harris government restored funding to the RHVP project.

While the project was again funded, it still required environment approvals to continue. Norm Sterling, Ontario Minister of the Environment, exempted the project. The Government of Canada notified Hamilton that the project would require federal environment approval, which Hamilton applied for in 1998. Environment Canada initiated a full environmental review, which Hamilton opposed, launching a lawsuit, arguing that the project had already been approved. A federal judicial review board sided with Hamilton, clearing the project for construction, although the federal government appealed twice to overturn the verdict. After losing the second appeal in 2001, the federal government decided not to appeal the judgment to the Supreme Court.

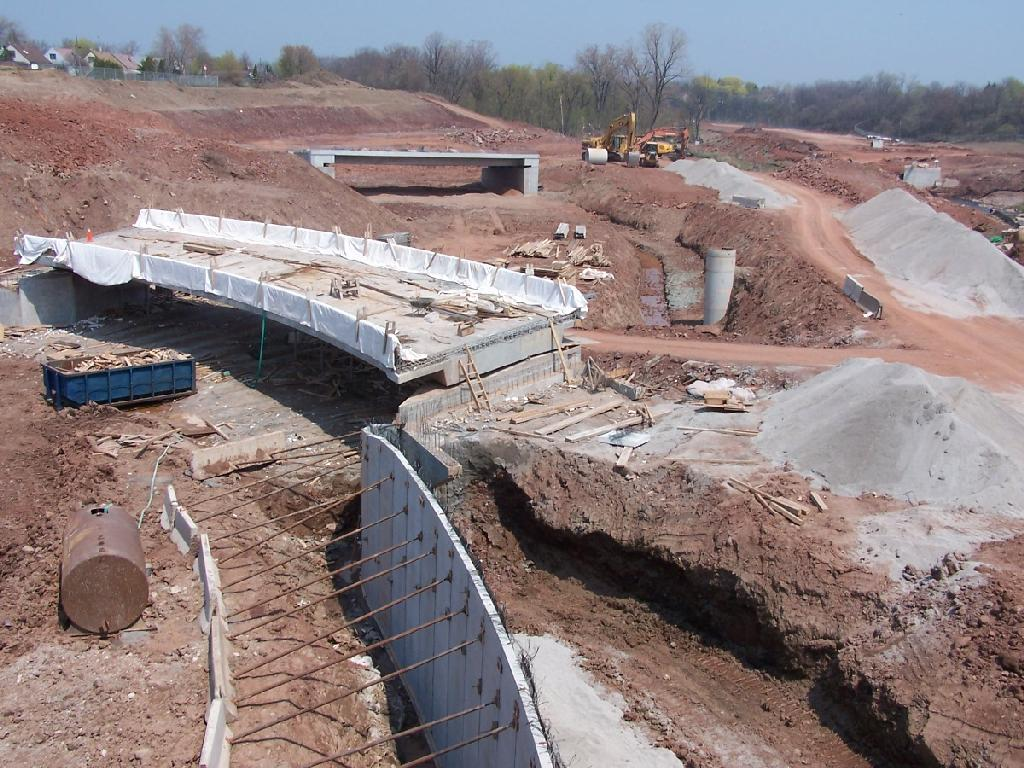
The Red Hill Valley Parkway at Queenston Rd under construction in May 2005

The City of Hamilton then launched a $75 million lawsuit against the Government of Canada, alleging misconduct in delaying the project. The lawsuit named federal cabinet ministers David Anderson, Sheila Copps, Herb Dhaliwal and Christine Stewart, as well as 65 federal employees as defendants. The lawsuit alleged "the defendants abused their public office by engaging in targeted malice towards the City's completion of the Expressway" and utilized environmental assessment "in an unprecedented, illegal and unconstitutional manner in order to achieve that objective." In 2008, after rejecting an offer to settle by the Government of Canada, Hamilton Council voted 8–6 to continue the lawsuit and remove a $450,000 spending cap on the suit. In November 2009, Hamilton Council voted to continue the lawsuit, and defeated a motion to make the legal costs public.

Opponents criticized the expected environmental damage of the project and questioned the economic viability of highway building in the face of declining oil production. Opponents asserted that two groups would be the chief beneficiaries of the expressway: long-distance truckers travelling from Detroit to Buffalo, and land developers on the Hamilton Mountain. Opponents also took issue with the city spending $220 million (its share of the project) to build the expressway. Opponents also argued that the need for the expressway was not shown in studies. A 1963 transportation study which supported construction, expected the population of Hamilton to be 785,000 by 1985, while the actual population reached 480,000 by 2001. Employment in the industrial bayfront had dropped and a commuting route between Hamilton Mountain and the bayfront was less necessary.

=== Construction ===
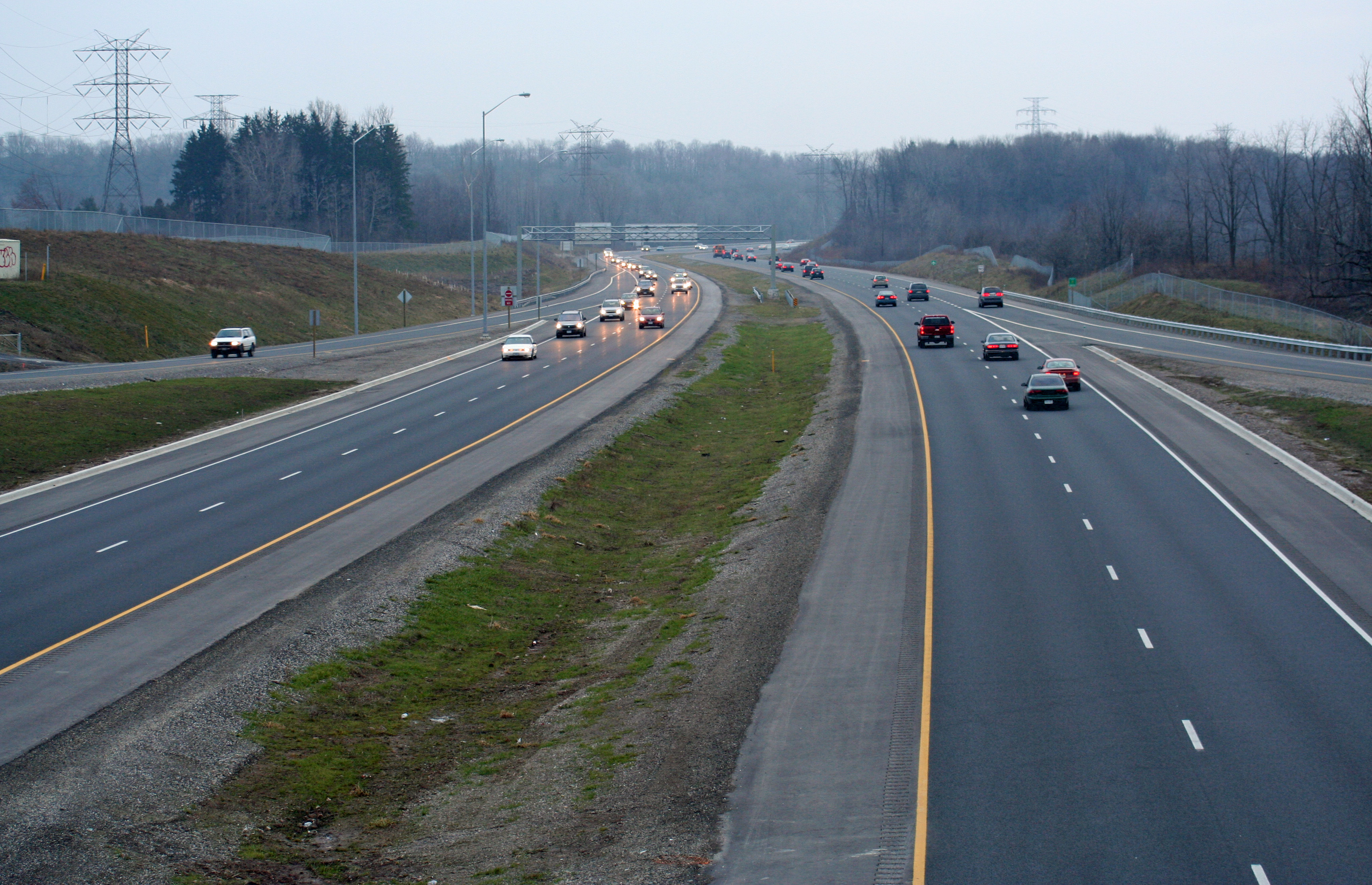
Red Hill Valley Parkway looking south from the Greenhill overpass shortly after opening to traffic in 2007

When Hamilton began construction of the expressway project, opponents began physically obstructing the construction of the project. Access roads were blocked, trees in the path of the roadway were occupied. Members of the Friends of the Red Hill Valley and Six Nations Confederacy camped out in the valley. Construction was halted while Hamilton fought a legal action launched by the Six Nations. Hamilton proceeded with legal action against the other occupiers. Eventually, the Six Nations entered into a partnership with Hamilton to manage the remaining green space. A Hamilton municipal election was held in 2003, and the pro-expressway candidate Larry Di Ianni won the mayorship over expressway opponent David Christopherson. Construction restarted in earnest with grading contracts in 2004. The squatters were removed, and full-time security guards patrolled the site during construction.

The expressway unofficially opened on November 3, 2007. The opening was accompanied by the Road to Hope race run by 150 people. The parkway was originally scheduled to be officially opened to vehicular traffic on November 16, 2007 but the date was postponed to November 17, 2007. The final estimate of construction cost was $245 million for the 7-kilometre (4.3 mi) long expressway. Some $120 million of the cost was paid for by the provincial government.

In 2016, the existing ramps from the Red Hill Valley Parkway to Stone Church Road were incorporated into the new Upper Red Hill Valley Parkway, an arterial road extension to link to the parkway from Trinity Church Road and the Red Hill Business Park.

In 2019, after multiple fatalities from collisions on the highway, the City of Hamilton ordered an inquiry into road friction. The $28 million inquiry found that there was low friction on the highway that led to those collisions. The inquiry also found that there was withheld information that could have led to lower speed limits and other safety measures to prevent further collisions. The city has since repaved the parkway in 2019, which has led to reduced collisions on the parkway.

== Exit list ==
The following table lists the major junctions along Red Hill Valley Parkway. The entire route is located in Hamilton.

| km | mi | Destinations | Notes |
|---|---|---|---|
| 6 | 3.7 | Lincoln M. Alexander Parkway west | Continuation past southern terminus |
| 6 | 3.7 | City Road 11 (Mud Street / Upper Red Hill Valley Parkway) – Albion Falls, Trenholme, Hannon | |
| 5 | 3.1 | Greenhill Avenue – Vincent, Red Hill | East side of Greenhill Avenue (divided at the creek) ends at the interchange with Red Hill Valley Parkway |
| 4 | 2.5 | King Street / Lawrence Road – Gershome, Vincent, Landsdale, Central | |
| 3 | 1.9 | City Road 8 (Queenston Road) – Glenview, Blakeley, The Delta, Stoney Creek, Fruitland | |
| 1 | 0.62 | Barton Street – Nashdale, Crown Point, Stipeley, Central | |
| 0 | 0.0 | Queen Elizabeth Way – Toronto, St. Catharines | |
1.000 mi = 1.609 km; 1.000 km = 0.621 mi: Route transition
