= Weston Road =

Street in Toronto and York Region in Ontario, Canada

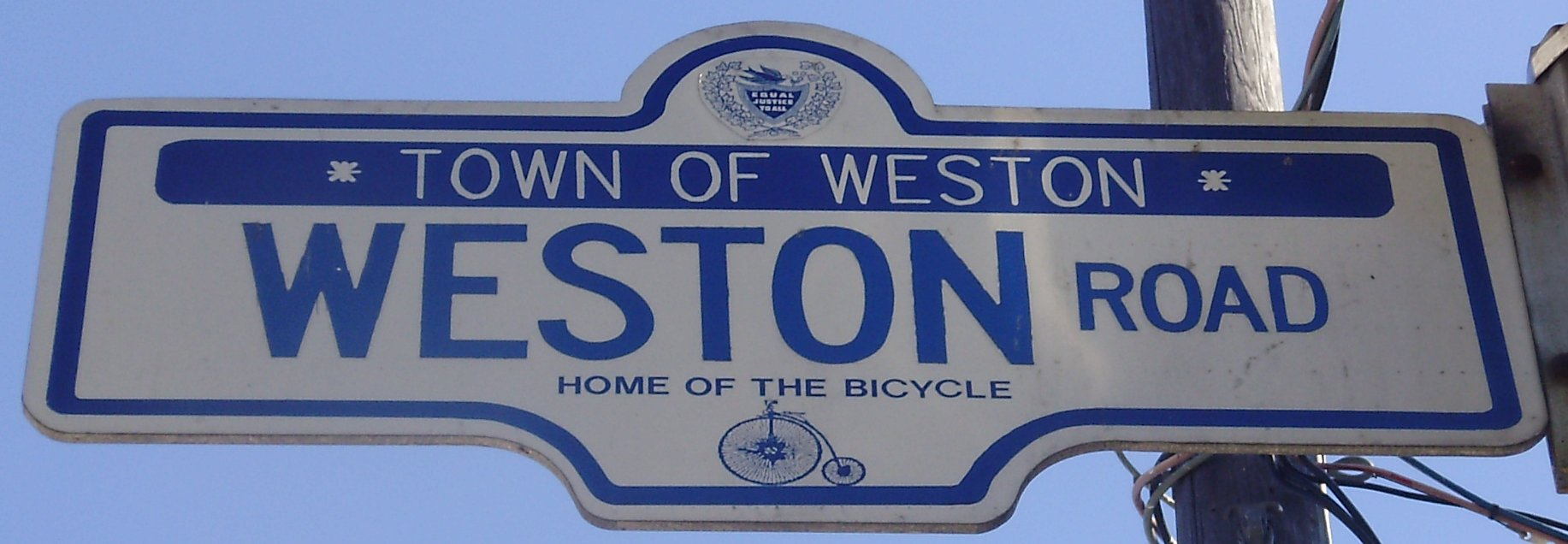
- York Regional Road 56
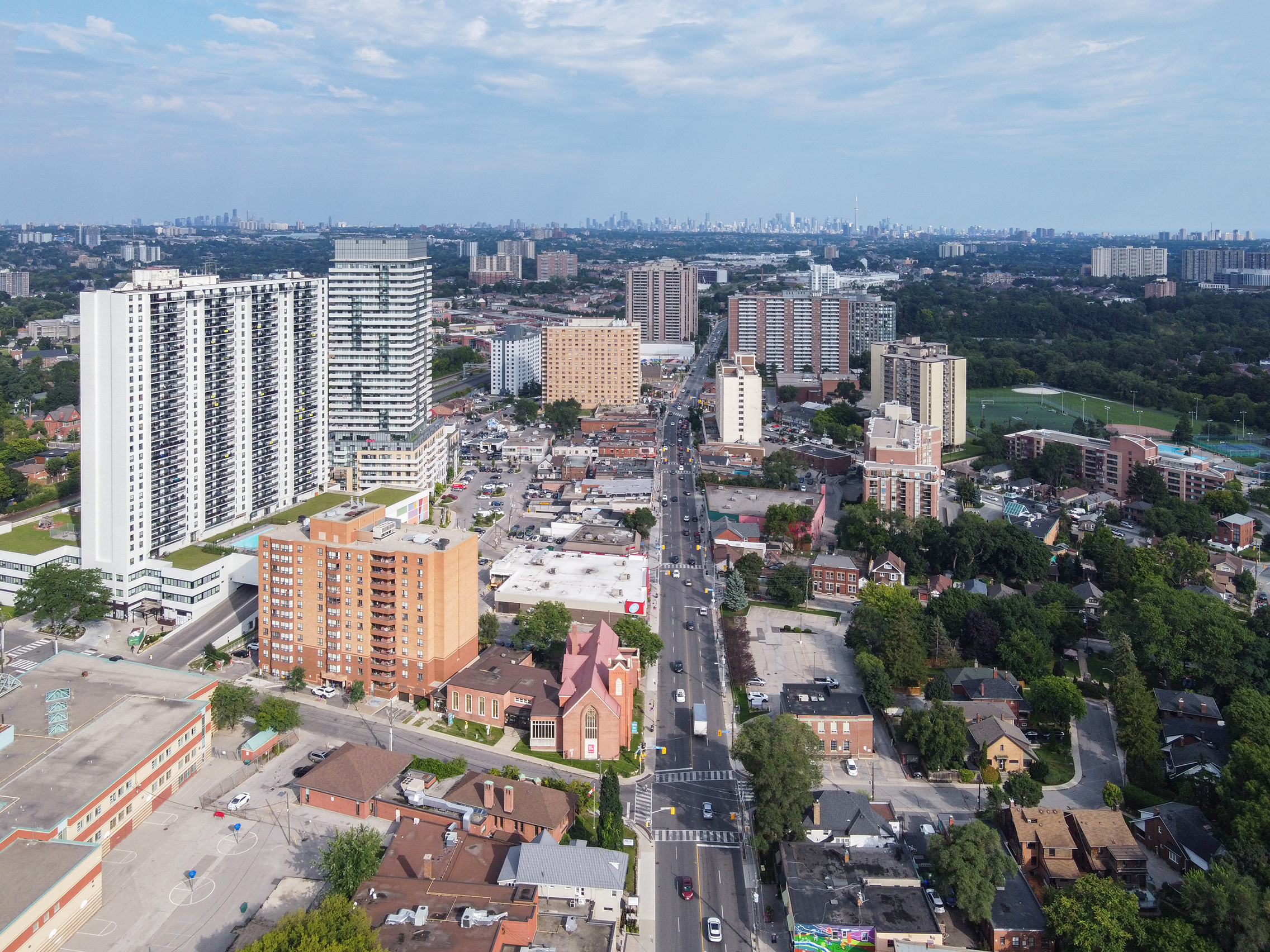
- Aerial view of Weston Road near the namesake Weston neighbourhood

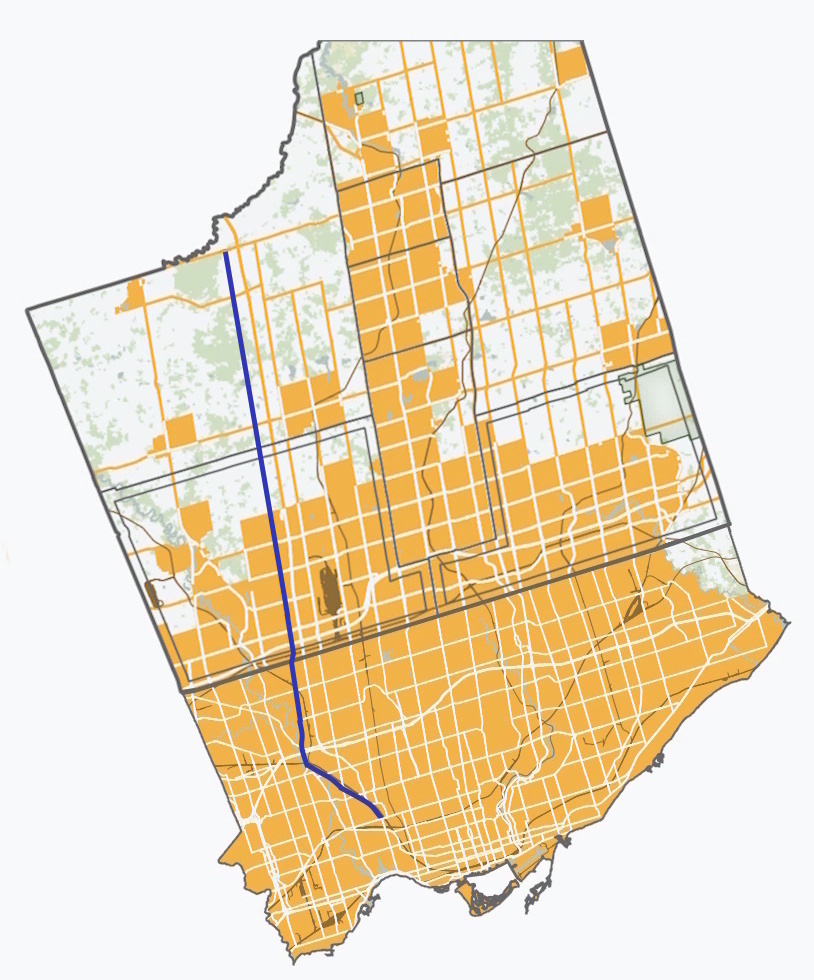
- Route of Weston Road through Toronto and York Region (blue line)
- Namesake: Weston, Toronto
- Maintained by: City of Toronto; Region of York
- South end: St. Clair Avenue (Continues as Keele Street)
- Major junctions: Black Creek Drive; Eglinton Avenue; Jane Street; Lawrence Avenue; Highway 401; Albion Road / Walsh Avenue; Sheppard Avenue; Finch Avenue; Steeles Avenue; Highway 407; Highway 7 Langstaff Road; Rutherford Road; Major Mackenzie Drive; Teston Road; King-Vaughan Road; King Road; Lloydtown-Aurora Road
- North end: Highway 9

Other
Nearby arterial roads
← Jane Street; Islington Avenue; Pine Valley Drive; York Road 27	Keele Street; Black Creek Drive; Highway 400 →

Weston Road is both a contour street and a north–south street in western Toronto and western York Region in Ontario, Canada. The road is named for the neighbourhood and former Town of Weston, which is located near Weston Road and Lawrence Avenue West.

== Route description ==
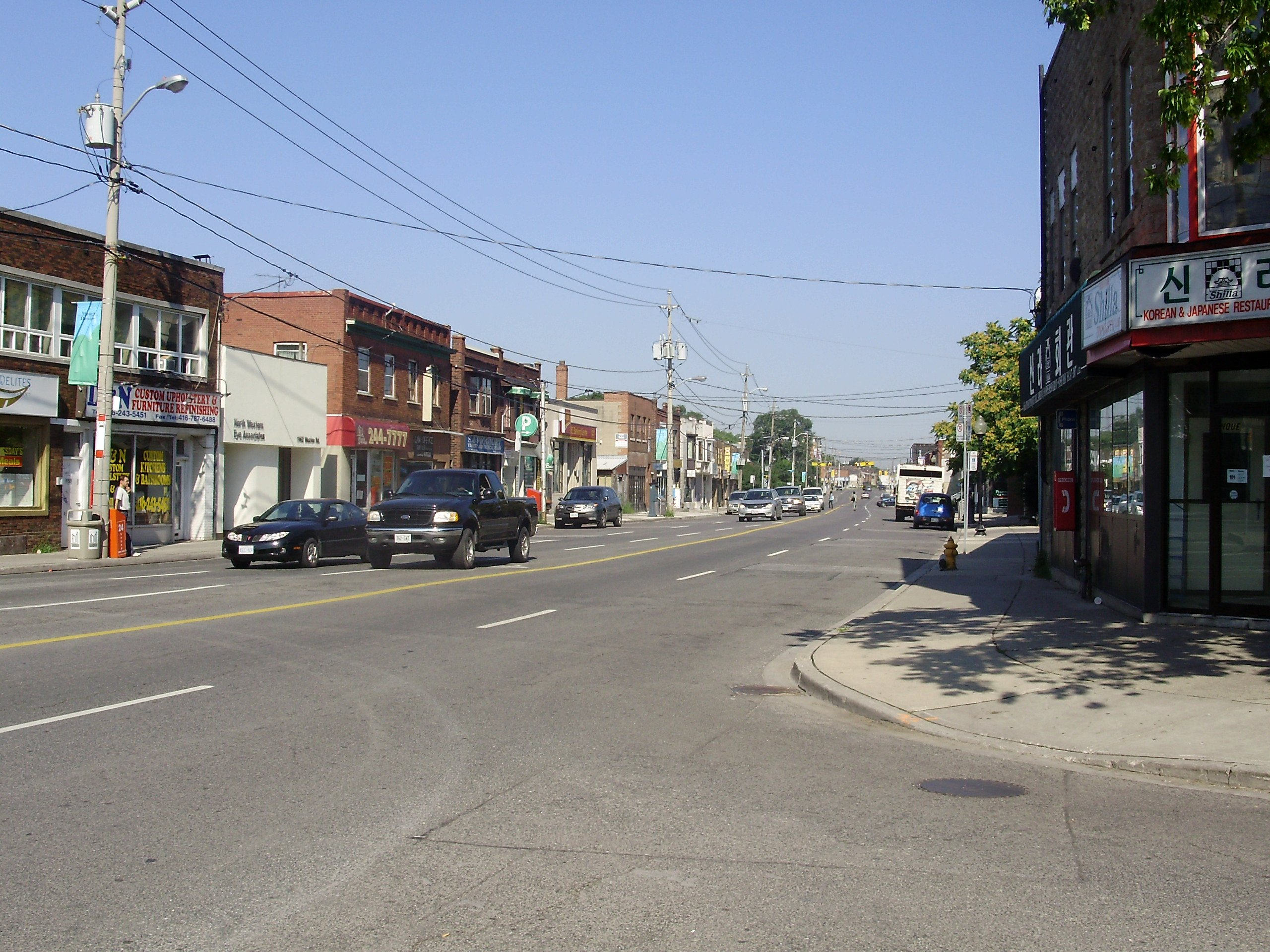
Storefronts along Weston Road in the Mount Dennis neighbourhood

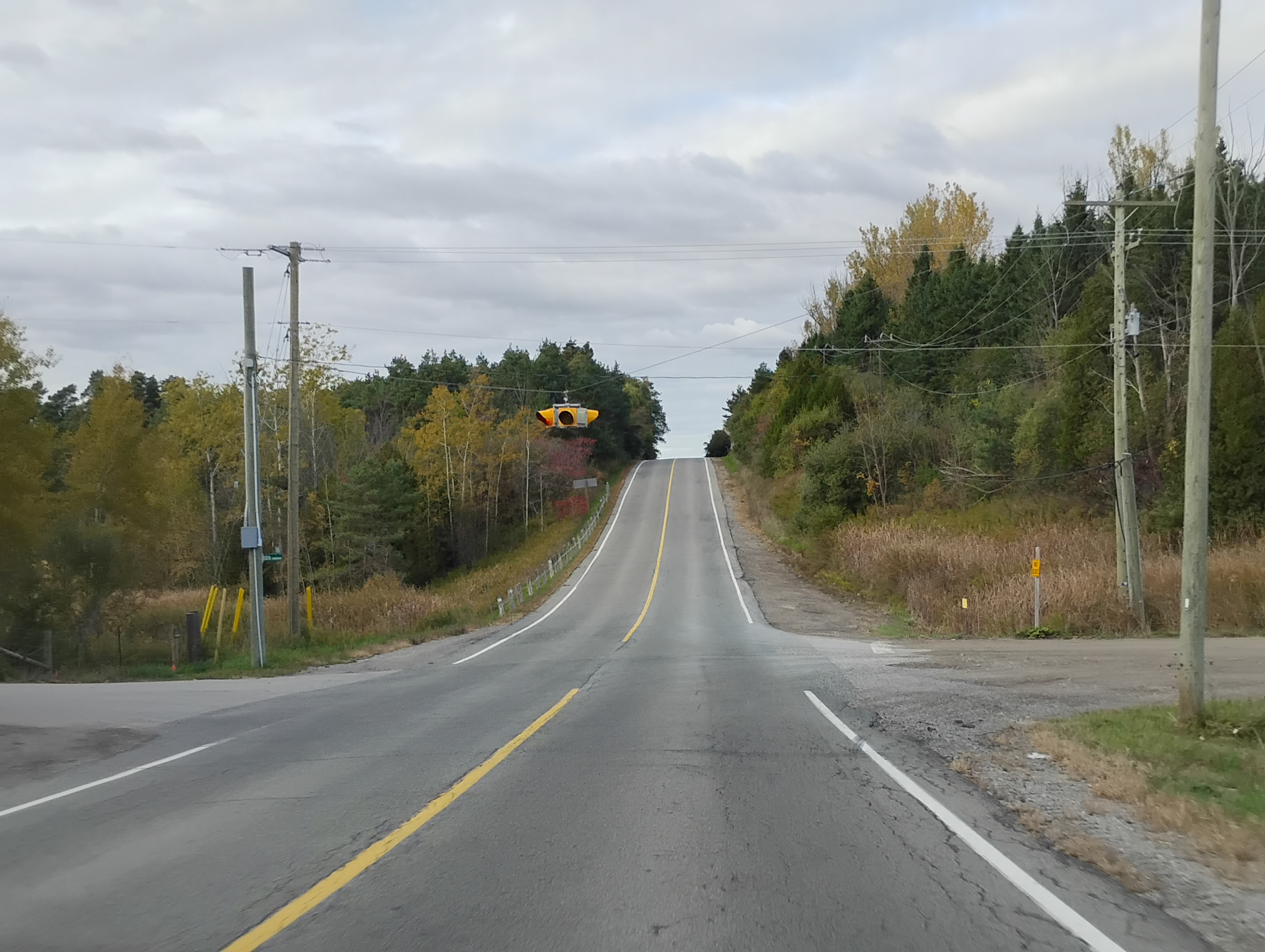
Rural Weston Road in King Township

In the south, Weston Road begins at St. Clair Avenue opposite the north end of the southern leg of Keele Street. The southernmost 55 metres of the street north of St. Clair, where the roadway diverted to the west off its straight baseline, was formerly a part of Keele, which officially breaks here and is cut off from its short mid-section. Weston Road formerly began at the diversion, but this stretch of Keele St was redesignated as part of Weston Road in 2006. Weston Road then travels diagonally across the general arterial road grid in a northwesterly direction as a contour road to St. Phillips Road, passing through Mount Dennis at Eglinton Avenue, and Weston at Lawrence Avenue. North of St. Phillips, it becomes a north-south artery but does not align to the grid proper until south of Sheppard Avenue. It runs parallel to Highway 400 from north of Highway 401 to Steeles Avenue and into Vaughan in York Region.

Most of Weston Road is a four-lane principal arterial road through residential areas, except for the northern section which is mostly industrial. The speed limit south of Finch Avenue is 50 km/h (30 mph), which increases to 60 km/h (35 mph) between Finch and Steeles.

North of the Toronto city limits at Steeles Avenue, Weston Road enters York Region, where it is designated as York Regional Road 56. It passes through the two western municipalities of York Region, Vaughan in the south and King in the north. The speed limit through the urbanized parts of Vaughan is 60 km/h (35 mph), while the limit is 80 km/h (50 mph) in rural Vaughan and King Township. The northern terminus of the road is at Highway 9 in the Holland Marsh. In Toronto, the speed limit is 50 km/h (30 mph) due to the unposted speed limit.

== History ==
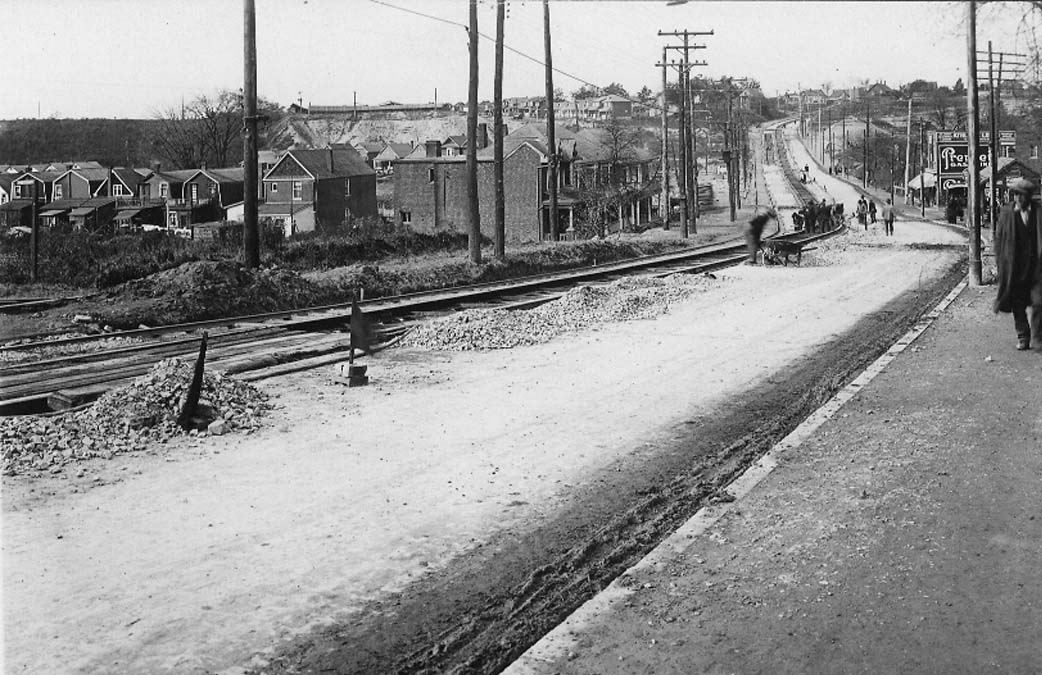
Looking north on Weston Road from north of present-day Rogers Road, 1925

Weston Road was first laid out in the first decade of the 1800s to connect Dundas Street to the village of Weston. This followed the route of what is today Old Weston and (west of Watts Avenue) Rogers Roads, then the route of the current Weston Road north to Weston. The old routing was renamed in 1948. Between 1810 and 1820, it was extended north to Vaughan Township by following Sixth Line West. In 1841, the route was bought by private interests and it became the "Weston Plank Road", a toll road of planks. The Weston Plank Road extended from Dundas Street north to Musson's Bridge over the Humber, where Albion Road began. The company built its headquarters at St. Phillips Road and Weston Road. The building exists today at 2371 Weston Road. In 1846, the Weston Plank Road Company built Albion Plank Road from Musson's bridge northwest to Clairville where one could continue north to Bolton via Indian Line. In the 1850s, the roads were assumed by the township and its municipalities.

=== Old Weston Road(s) ===
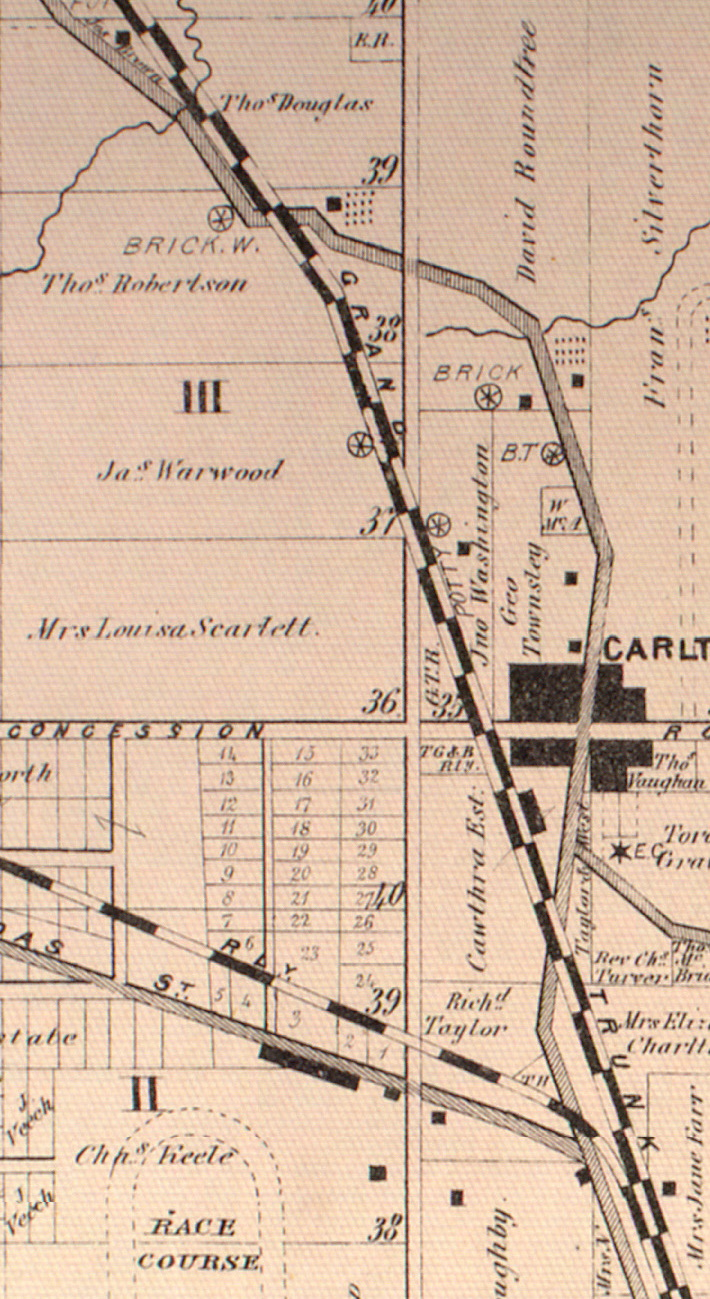
1880 map showing the original course of Weston Road, as well as a still-unbroken Keele Street

Additionally, there are two bypassed "Old Weston Roads"; the first being located in the environs of the southern terminus. It begins as a minor stub running north from intersection of Dundas, Dupont and Annette Streets, and breaks at the Canadian Pacific tracks, which were bridged until the 1970s. It resumes just south of the western terminus of Davenport Road, widens to four lanes, passes through the neighbourhood of Silverthorne, and ends at Rogers Road, the westernmost section of which also formed part of the original Weston Road, before the construction of the new Weston Road course south of Rogers Road's present terminus.

The second is located in Vaughan, just north of Steeles Avenue, and was created when a jog was eliminated. It lies just east of the linking segment where it continues south as Signet Drive (built as a southerly extension of the offset York Region section), and ends at a T-intersection with Weston Road two blocks north of Steeles.

== Public transit ==
Streetcars served Weston Road until 1948, when they were replaced by trolley buses on the Weston Road trolley bus route, which was numbered 89 in 1956. Trolley bus service on route 89 ended in January 1992.

Sixteen bus routes serve Weston Road: 41 Keele (southbound only), 59 Maple Leaf, 71 Runnymede, 73CD Royal York, 84A Sheppard West, 89 Weston, 119B Torbarrie, 158 Trethewey, 161 Rogers Rd, 165 Weston Rd North, 166 Toryork, 168 Symington, 171 Mount Dennis, 341 Keele Blue Night, 941 Keele Express (southbound only) and 989 Weston Express. The 89 Weston serves Weston Road from Albion Road and Walsh Avenue to St. Clair Avenue West, then via Keele Street to Keele subway station. The 165 Weston Road North serves Weston Road from Steeles Avenue West to Albion Road and Walsh Avenue, then via east on Walsh and Wilson Avenues to Wilson station, then east to York Mills station. The 41 Keele, 341 Keele Blue Night and 941 Keele Express only serve Weston Road travelling southbound, serving Old Weston Road and Rogers Road travelling northbound. Unlike the aforementioned 89 Weston and 165 Weston Rd North, the 989 Weston Express serves all of Weston Road in Toronto, from Keele station to Steeles Avenue.

York Region Transit route 165 Weston serves Weston Road north of Steeles Avenue, running from Pioneer Village station to the Major Mackenzie West Terminal, which is located to the north of Canada's Wonderland.

== In popular culture ==
The road is mentioned in Toronto native Drake's 2016 song "Weston Road Flows", his 2015 song "You & The Six", and his 2018 song "God's Plan".

== See also ==
- List of north-south roads in Toronto
- List of numbered roads in York Region
