= Ontario Highway 2A =

Highway in Ontario, Canada

Highway 2A

Route information
- Maintained by City of Toronto (Toronto Transportation Services)
- Length: 3.4 km (2.1 mi)

Major junctions
- West end: Highland Creek overpass (continues as Kingston Road)
- Lawson Road; Kingston Road; Port Union Road
- East end: Highway 401 – Kingston

Location
- Country: Canada
- Province: Ontario

Highway system
- Toronto municipal expressways
(by date opened)
Highway 2A (1936)	Gardiner Expressway (1958) →
Ontario municipal expressways
(in alphabetical order)
← Highbury Avenue	Highway 2A	Lincoln M. Alexander Parkway →

Highway 2A

Route information
- Auxiliary route of Highway 2
- Maintained by Ministry of Transportation of Ontario

Location
- Country: Canada
- Province: Ontario

Highway system
- Ontario provincial highways; Current; Former; 400-series
← Highway 2	→ Highway 3
Former provincial highways
Highway 2S →

Highway 2A is a municipal expressway in Toronto, Canada. Previously, King's Highway 2A was the designation of five separate provincially maintained highways in the Canadian province of Ontario, including the Toronto section. Highway 2A was an alternate route to Highway 2 in Chatham, London and Cornwall; these routes were all eventually redesignated. Highway 2A was also a highway that extended from Windsor to Tilbury, which was redesignated as Highway 98 in 1938.

The final and most familiar section of highway to be designated Highway 2A was the bypass of Highway 2 (Kingston Road) between Toronto and Newcastle, most of which became part of Highway 401 (formerly the Toronto Bypass) in July 1952. A short stub that wasn't incorporated into Highway 401 was all that remained of Highway 2A, consisting of a 3.4 km (2.1 mile) dual carriageway connecting Highway 401 with Kingston Road. Despite losing its provincial highway status in 1998, Highway 2A was never renamed and is still referenced by its highway designation on signage.

== Route description ==
East of the Highland Creek bridges (which bypasses Old Kingston Road), Kingston Road defaults to Highway 2A, although the routing for Kingston Road continues via an off-ramp at the Lawson Road interchange. After the Lawson Road exit, the route becomes a fully controlled-access freeway until Highway 401. Despite being surrounded by urban developments, Highway 2A still retains its rural character as it remains unlit and lacks roadside businesses. The speed limit is 80 kilometres per hour (50 mph), and it is patrolled by the Toronto Police Service.

== History ==
=== Windsor–Tilbury ===
Highway 2A
- Location: Tecumseh Road – Mill Street
- Length: 54.7 km (34.0 mi)
- Existed: 1927–1938; Renumbered as Highway 98

The Windsor to Tilbury section of Highway 2A originally was designated in 1929 along the route of what would become Highway 114, near Maidstone. When Highway 18 was redesignated between Windsor and Leamington in 1931, Highway 2 was rerouted onto its former routing. The old routing of Highway 2 prior to that became Highway 2A, and the existing Highway 2A was renumbered as Highway 3B.

Between 1931 and 1938, the route followed the Provincial Highway between Tecumseh Road in downtown Windsor, and Mill Street in Tilbury, both at junctions with Highway 2. In 1938, the entire route was renumbered as Highway 98

=== Chatham ===
Highway 2A
- Location: Richmond Street/Keil Drive South – Grand Avenue East/Thames Street
- Length: 3.5 km (2.2 mi)
- Existed: 1957–1961 (renumbered as Highway 2B 1961-1970)

Highway 2A in Chatham was established in 1957 along the original route of Highway 2 when it was rerouted along the West Chatham Bypass (Keil Street) and Grand Avenue. The route began at Highway 2 at the intersection of Richmond Street and Keil Street, following the former into downtown Chatham, where it turned north onto Queen Street then east onto School Street. From there, the route turned north onto Centre Street, which becomes 5th Street shortly thereafter. The route crossed the Thames River, north of which it became Thames Street and continued to Highway 2 (Grand Avenue East). The route was renumbered as Highway 2B in 1961 and decommissioned by 1970.

=== London ===
Highway 2A
- Location: Highway 4 (Wharncliffe Road South)/Stanley Street – Dundas Street/Highbury Avenue
- Length: 5.5 km (3.4 mi)
- Existed: 1956–1968

Highway 2A in London provided an alternative parallel route to Highway 2 through the downtown core, travelling from a concurrent Highway 2 and Highway 4 eastward along Stanley Street, York Street, Florence Street and finally Highbury Avenue. At its eastern end, it met Highway 2 (Dundas Street). The route was established in 1956 and decommissioned in 1968.

=== Cornwall ===
Highway 2A
- Location: Vincent Massey Drive/Power Dam Drive – Brookdale Avenue/Second Street
- Length: 5.2 km (3.2 mi)
- Existed: 1965–1967

Highway 2A (Alt.) in Cornwall was a short-lived designation applied along Nine Mile Road (now Power Dam Drive) and Second Street on the west side of the city. It provided an alternate bypass to the Seaway International Bridge. The route was established in 1965 and remained in place for only two years before being decommissioned in 1967.

=== Toronto–Newcastle ===
Highway 2A
- Location: Kingston Road – Highway 401
- Length: 3.4 km (2.1 mi) 29.8 km (18.5 mi) before 1952
- Existed: 1947–1997

As automobile use in southern Ontario grew in the early twentieth century, road design and construction advanced significantly. Following frequent erosion of the former macadamized Lake Shore Road, a cement road known as the Toronto–Hamilton Highway was proposed in January 1914. By November 1914, the proposal was approved, and work began quickly to construct the road from Toronto to Hamilton known today as Lake Shore Boulevard and Lakeshore Road. The road was formally opened on November 24, 1917, 18 feet (5.5 m) wide and nearly 40 mi (64 km) long. It was the first concrete road in Ontario, as well as one of the longest stretches of concrete road between two cities in the world.

Over the next decade, vehicle usage increased substantially, and by 1920 Lakeshore Road was again highly congested on weekends. In response, the Department of Highways examined improving another road between Toronto and Hamilton. Middle Road, a continuation of Queen Street west of the Humber River, was chosen to avoid delays on Dundas or Lakeshore. The road was to be more than twice the width of Lakeshore Road at 40 ft (12 m), and would carry two lanes of traffic in either direction. Construction on what was then known as the Queen Street Extension between Highway 10 and Highway 27 began in early 1931, and between Highway 27 and the Humber River on November 1, 1931.

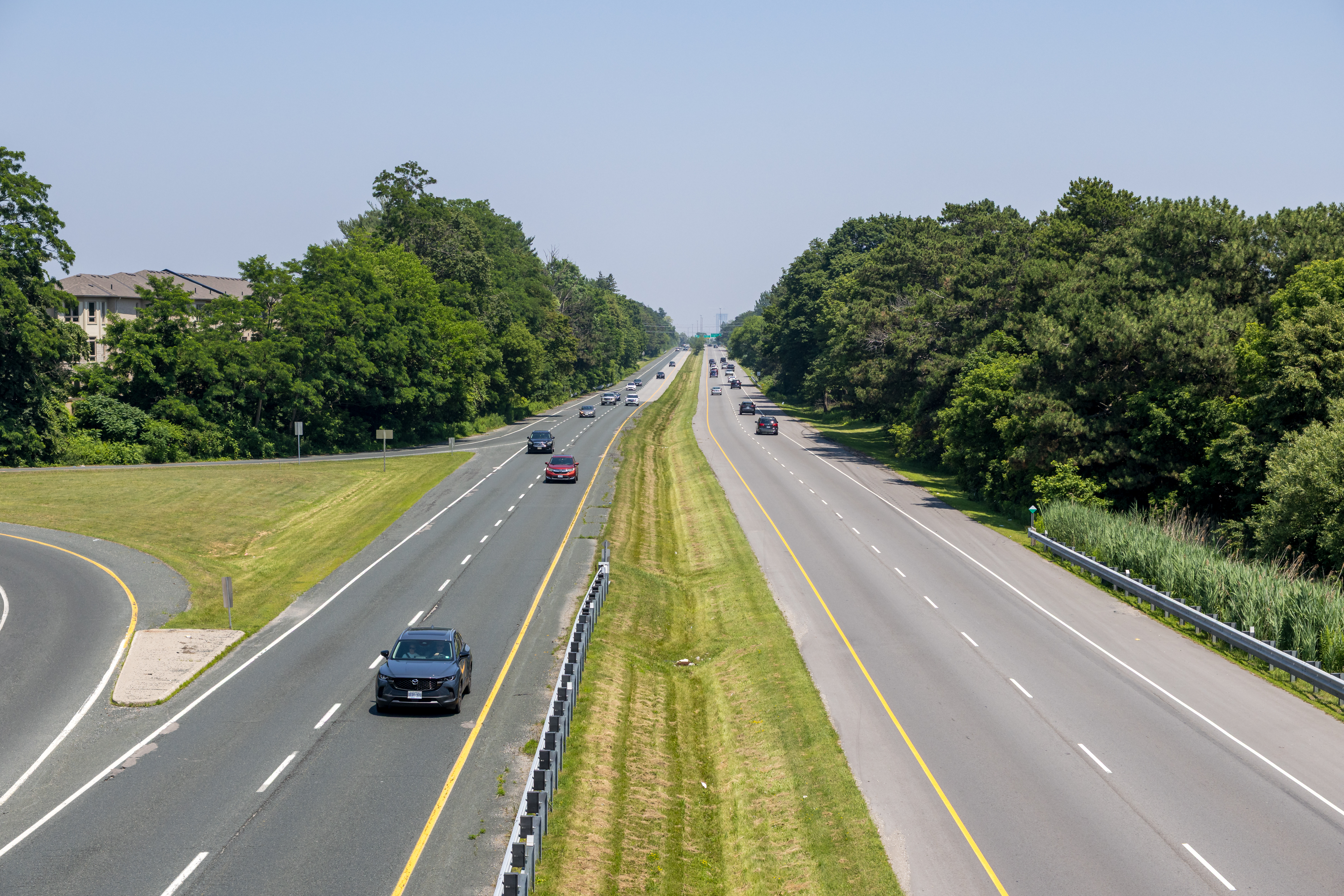
Aside from a resurfaced pavement and guardrails, Highway 2A has not been altered since it opened in 1947.

Before the highway could be completed, Thomas McQuesten was appointed the new minister of the Department of Highways, with Robert Melville Smith as deputy minister, following the 1934 provincial elections. Smith, inspired by the German Autobahn's—new "dual-lane divided highways"—modified the design for Ontario roads, and McQuesten ordered that the Middle Road be converted into this new form of highway. A 132 ft (40 m) right-of-way was purchased along the Middle Road and construction began to convert the existing sections to a divided highway, as well as on Canada's first interchange at Highway 10.

Beginning in 1935, McQuesten applied the concept of a dual-highway to several projects along Highway 2, including a section between Birchmount Road and east of Morningside Avenue in what was then known as Scarborough Township. When widening in Scarborough reached the Highland Creek ravine in 1936, east of Morningside, the Department of Highways began construction on a new bridge over the large valley, bypassing the former alignment around the village of West Hill. From there to Oshawa, the highway was constructed along a new alignment, avoiding construction on the congested Highway 2. As grading and bridge construction neared completion between Highland Creek and Ritson Road in September 1939, World War II broke out and gradually money was siphoned from highway construction to the war effort.

They are designed for sustained speed, with the best alignments, fewest curves and least grades possible and by-passing centres of population. We need this new version of highway, as a major arterial road for a major congested metropolitan area.

— Thomas McQueston

Following the war, construction resumed on roadways throughout Ontario. The expressway between Highland Creek and Oshawa was completed in December 1947. The Toronto–Barrie Highway was the primary focus of the Department of Highways at the time, and the onset of the Korean War in 1949 continued to stall construction. Despite the delays, highway minister George Doucette officially announced the plans for construction of the new trans-provincial expressway in 1950, with the Toronto to Oshawa expressway serving as a model for the design.

Along with an extension of the Highway between Oshawa and Highway 35 and Highway 115, most of Highway 2A was redesignated Highway 401 in July 1952. A short stub that wasn't incorporated into Highway 401 was all that remained of Highway 2A, consisting of a 3.4 km (2.1 mile) dual carriageway connecting Highway 401 with Kingston Road.

Highway 2A, despite being a spur route, retained in the provincial inventory until April 1, 1997, when it was transferred to the City of Toronto as part of a provincial downloading of highways to municipalities. Despite falling under municipal control, the highway continues to be named Highway 2A. The off ramp from westbound 401 lists Kingston Road with a number 2 regional road marker, despite the fact the road does not have any numerical designation within Toronto.

== Exit list ==
The following table lists the major junctions along Highway 2A. The entire route is located in Toronto.

km	mi	Destinations	Notes
0.0	0.0	Highland Creek Overpass	Parclo A2 connecting to Kingston Road and Lawson Road; Additional RIRO lane on westbound side between the Parclo to the east and Highland Creek to the west, separated from main highway by a concrete median strip. The lane has an entrance from Kingston Road westbound, and both entrances from and exits to Military Trail and Morrish Road
		Kingston Road	Westbound entrance; access from eastbound 401 via exit 390
		Port Union Road	Modified Parclo A4
3.4	2.1	Highway 401	Eastbound exit and westbound entrance; westbound exit via Port Union Road; eastbound entrance via Kingston Road (Exit 390)
1.000 mi = 1.609 km; 1.000 km = 0.621 mi
