= Roads in Ontario =

There are many classes of roads in Ontario, Canada, including provincial highways (which is further broken down into the King's Highways, the 400-series, Secondary Highways, Tertiary Highways, and the 7000-series), county (or regional) roads, and local municipal routes.

== County and regional roads ==
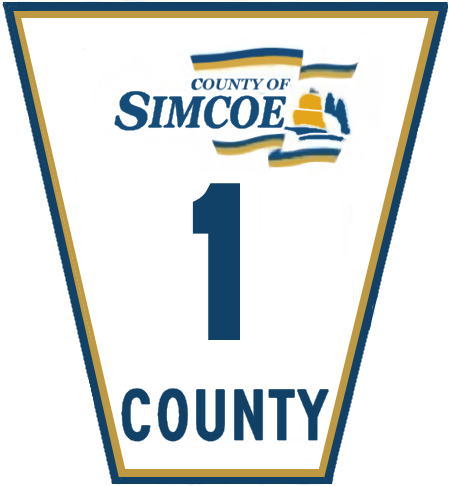

== City roads and streets ==
=== Markham ===
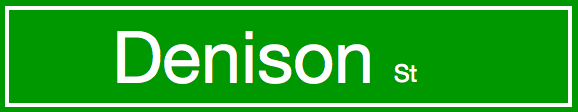

=== Mississauga ===
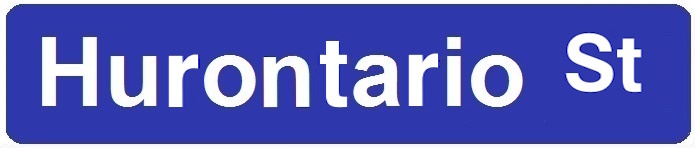

=== Toronto ===
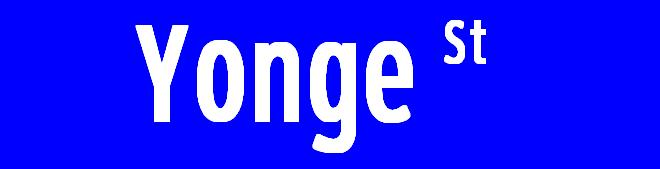
