= CIBC 750 Lawrence =

Office complex in Toronto, Ontario, Canada

Coordinates: 43.715691°N 79.449837°W

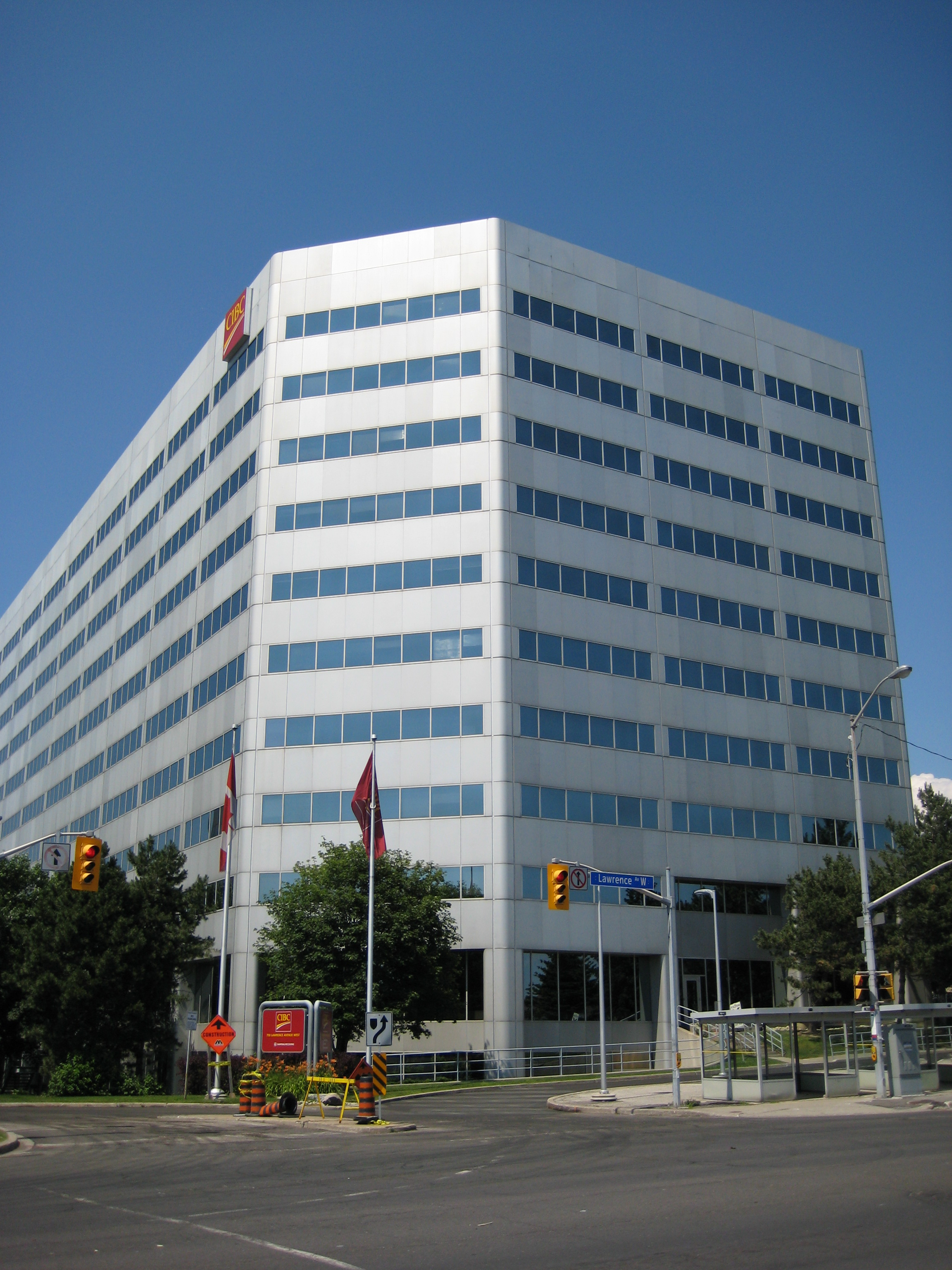
CIBC 750 Lawrence

CIBC 750 Lawrence is a two-tower office complex in Toronto, Ontario, Canada. It opened in 1981 as a branch and a sub-unit of Canadian Imperial Bank of Commerce's (CIBC) head office branch at Commerce Court, and is the main headquarters of CIBC Credit Card Services, including Visa call centres and Visa operations.

It is located in Lawrence Heights across the street from Lawrence Square Shopping Centre and a short walk to Lawrence West subway station.

== Architecture and construction ==
750 Lawrence consists of two buildings, one eight stories (West) and the other, twelve stories (East), built by Toronto-based firm Bregman + Hamann Architects (B+H) in 1981. B+H is the same firm involved in renovations in 2001. Between the two wings is a tree-lined courtyard with benches and used for staff events.

== History ==
When 750 Lawrence opened in 1981, it housed CIBC Mortgage Department which took up three floors in the West Tower, CIBC Marketing which took up two floors in the East Tower and one floor in the West, several smaller departments, and CIBC Dealer Plan department. Dealer Plan had a small parking lot where repossessed cars and small trucks were kept. That parking lot is now known as the Contractors' parking lot. 750 Lawrence used to be a much smaller building that housed only the CIBC Stationery Department before its demolition to make way for the buildings as they are today.

The west wall of the West Tower was damaged in 2001 by a large fire at a housing development located directly to the west at 760 Lawrence. Every window on that west wall was cracked or broken except one.

Until 2001, 750 Lawrence housed an internal branch for employees. The branch was a sub-unit of the head office branch at Commerce Court West and shared the same transit number, 0002. Even though this branch has closed, the building itself maintains the same transit number. The space occupied by this branch was renovated in 2001 to be an employee lounge and six conference rooms and four Visa Training rooms.

In 2014, CIBC installed 4 new banking machines in the West main floor. Two of those machines were among the first CIBC machines to offer an envelope-free deposit service, where the machine scans your bill deposit and counts it.

== Ownership ==
Even though CIBC sold most of its buildings, including Commerce Court, in the late 1990s, 750 Lawrence continues to be owned by CIBC, and is managed by Brookfield Global Integrated Solutions for CIBC.

== Occupants ==
=== Visa ===
The building houses Visa call centres and Visa operations. Employees in Visa are members of the Steel Workers Union in Toronto, USW Local 8300. The union represents those workers who used to be called the Union of Bank Employees Local 2104. The Visa call centre at 750 is now the only unionized department in CIBC, but at the time of the strike in 1986, the Commerce Court Mail Room, Stationery Department, Mortgage Department, a few branches in downtown Toronto, and the Internal Mail Courier Trucks that transported correspondences within the greater Toronto area were also unionized. Although the Stationery Department, Mortgage Department and the branches did not take part in the strike, they supported the workers. During negotiations with CIBC, the Mortgage and Stationery Departments broke away from the union and never joined again.

=== Other tenants ===
Besides CIBC, the following retailers and/or tenants operate in the building:

- BGIS
- Garda Security
- Aramark Food Services
- Aramark Mail Services
- GDI Cleaning
- Tim Hortons

== Services ==
- G4S internal security for the entire complex and garage - replaced Garda in September 2015
- Standard Parking - in 2001 the garage complex was outsourced to Standard Parking, and since then, CIBC Employees have had to pay for parking at $25 a month. BGIS made some repairs to the garage structure but as of today, Dec 6, 2022, it STILL leaks from top to bottom, and 2 of the stairwells flood and freeze almost every time it rains or any defrost happens, but surrounding parking lots have been maintained as of now.
