= Yorkdale–Glen Park =

Coordinates: 43.708°N 79.448°W

- Neighbourhood
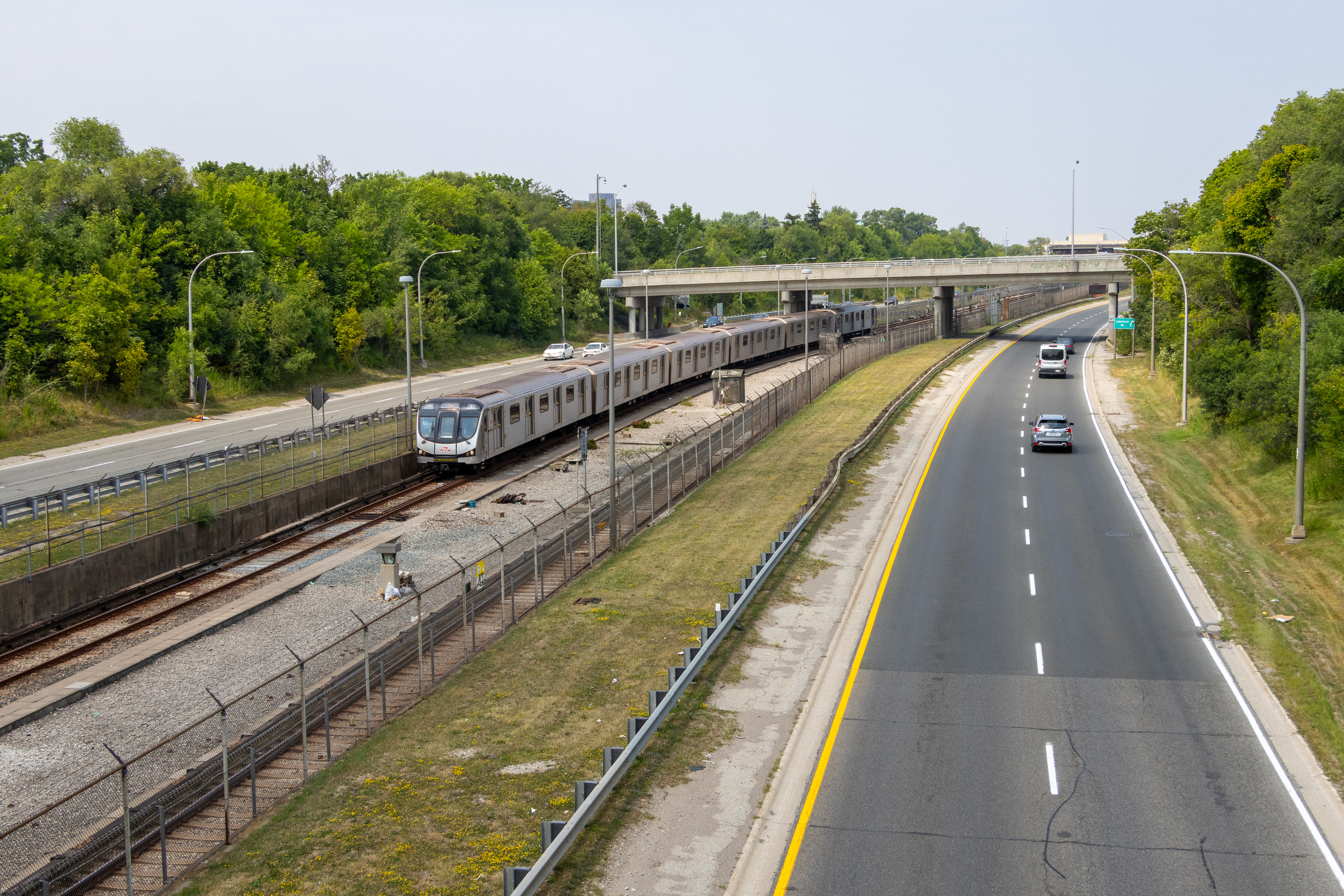
- View of Glen Park from Glencairn Avenue and Allen Road

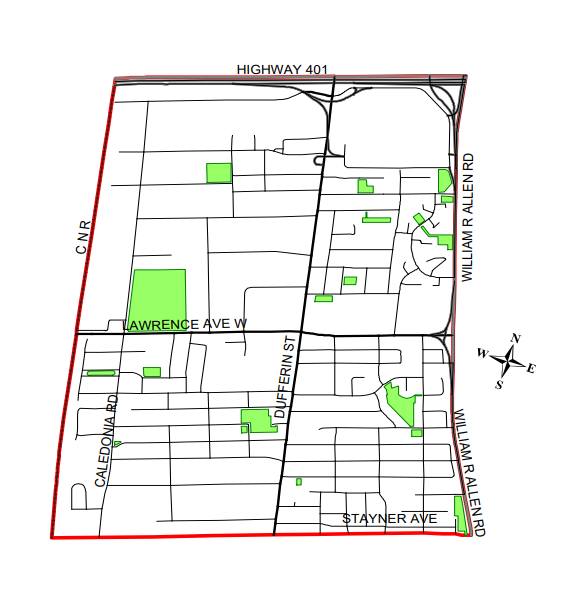
- Map of Yorkdale–Glen Park (City of Toronto)
- Country: Canada
- Province: Ontario
- City: Toronto
- Municipality established: 1850 York Township
- Changed municipality: 1922 North York from York Township
- Changed municipality: 1998 Toronto from North York

Population (2021)
  - Total: 16,625
  - Density: 2,451/km^{2} (6,350/sq mi)

Yorkdale–Glen Park is a neighbourhood in the city of Toronto, Ontario, Canada, located in the former suburb of North York. It is bounded by Highway 401 to the north, Allen Road to the east, a line south of Stayner Avenue to the south, and the CNR tracks to the west.

== Character and demographics ==
For the most part, the homes in southern Yorkdale–Glen Park (south of Lawrence) tend to date back to the 1950s and 1960s, when developers perfected the uniform vista of bungalows and back splits. Southern Yorkdale–Glen Park is a middle-class suburban community of brick houses. Local shopping areas include Lawrence Plaza, Yorkdale Mall and various street shopping areas along Dufferin Street and Marlee Avenue.

The southern section of Yorkdale–Glen Park, centred on Dufferin Street, is home to a large Italian-Canadian population.

Northwest Yorkdale–Glen Park is primarily industrial, especially along Bridgeland Avenue, and commercial, with a concentration of outlet-style specialty stores especially around Orfus Road. There is a small residential swath bounded by Paul David Street to the west, Dufferin Street to the east, Bentworth Avenue to the south and Jane Osler Drive to the north.

Northeast Yorkdale–Glen Park (east of Dufferin, north of Lawrence) is part of Lawrence Heights.

Total population (2021): 16,625

Major ethnic populations (2021):

- 48.5% White; 23.0% Italian, 8.2% Portuguese
- 10.2% Black; 2.9% Jamaican
- 8.5% Filipino
- 8.2% Latin American (of any ethnicity)
- 6.9% South Asian
- 6.2% Chinese
- 5.8% East Indian

Total population (2016): 14,804

Major ethnic populations (2016):

- 52.0% White; 27.4% Italian, 9.8% Portuguese
- 9.9% Black; 5.2% Jamaican
- 7.7% Chinese
- 7.5% Filipino
- 6.6% South Asian
- 5.2% East Indian
- 4.8% Latin American (of any ethnicity)

Total population (2011): 14,687

Major ethnic populations (2011):

- 56.0% White; 28.2% Italian, 7.7% Portuguese
- 10.7% Black
- 6.5% Chinese
- 6.5% Filipino
- 5.1% South Asian
- 4.9% Latin American (of any ethnicity)

Total population (2006): 14,430

Major ethnic populations (2006):

- 59.6% White; 33.6% Italian, 5.7% Portuguese
- 11.3% Black; 4.3% Jamaican
- 6.9% Chinese
- 6.7% South Asian
- 5.9% East Indian
- 5.8% Filipino
- 4.3% Latin American (of any ethnicity)

Total population (2001): 13,520

Major ethnic populations (2001):

- 67.6% White; 39.3% Italian, 4.0% Portuguese
- 7.3% Chinese
- 6.9% Black
- 5.1% East Indian
- 4.0% South Asian
- 3.4% Filipino
- 2.7% Latin American (of any ethnicity)

== Education ==
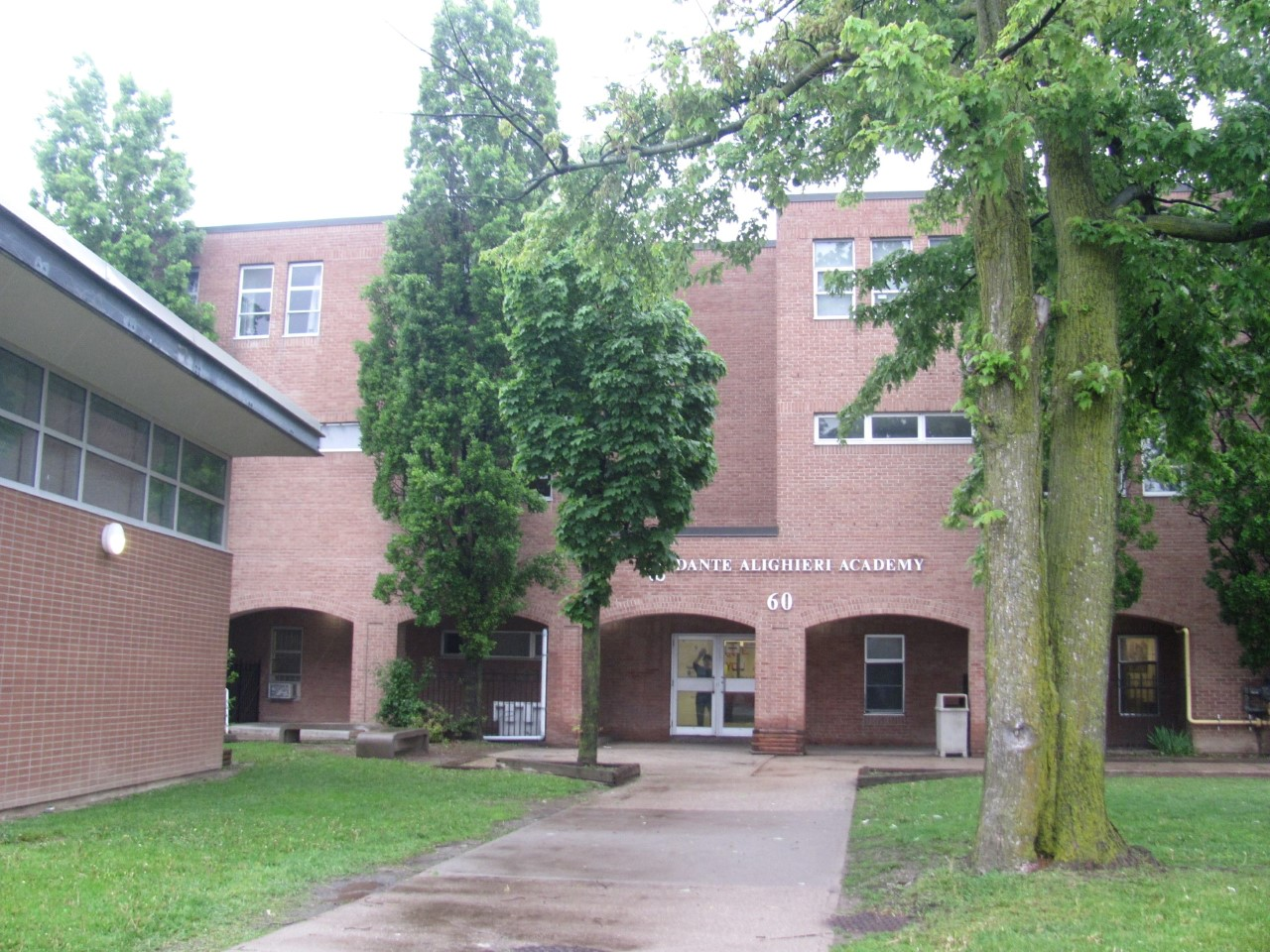
Dante Alighieri Academy is a Catholic secondary school in the Toronto Catholic District School Board.

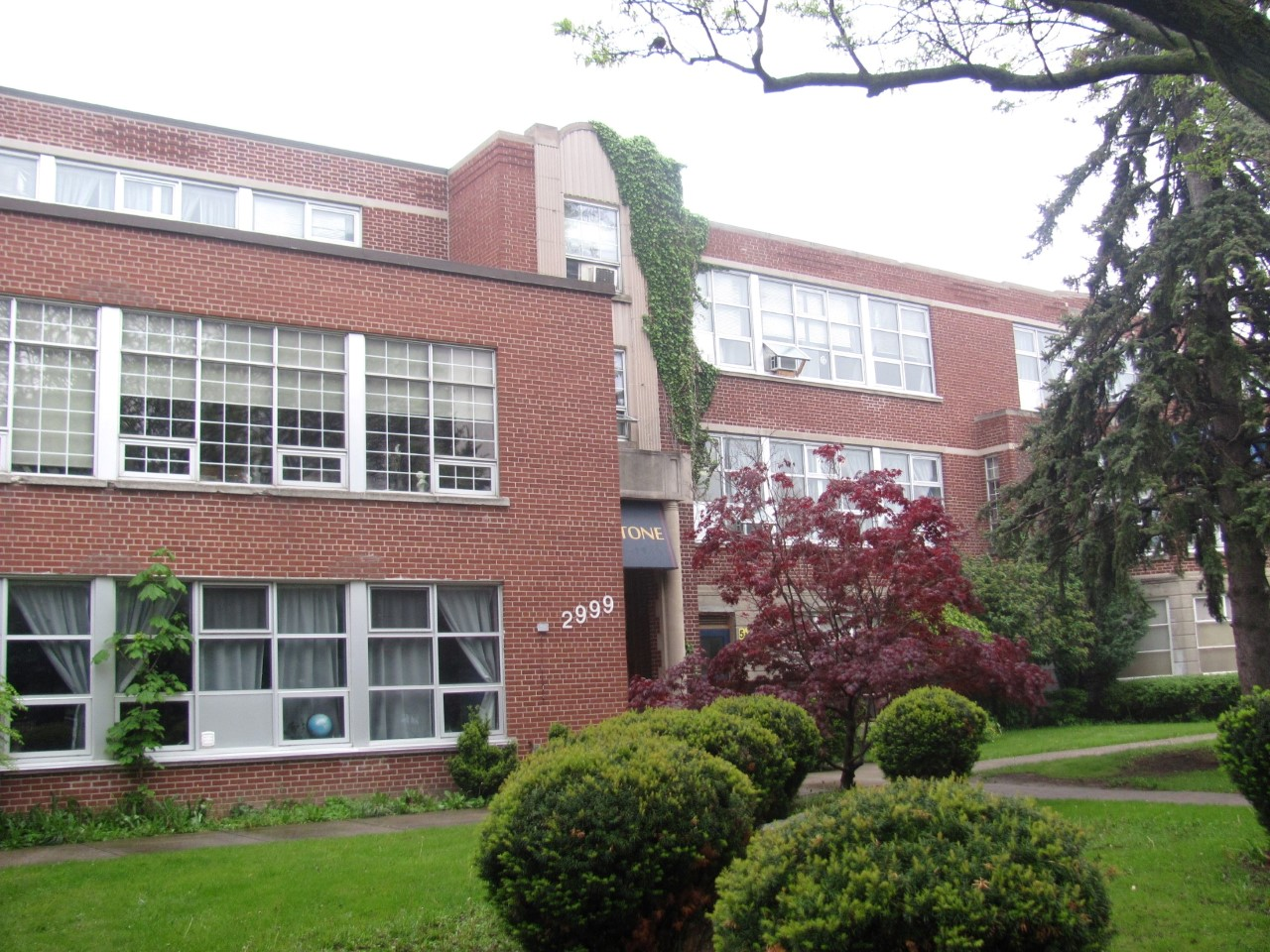
C.B. Parsons Junior High School was established by the North York Board of Education and is occupied by Fieldstone Day School as Canada's only Cambridge private school.

Two public school boards operate elementary schools in Glen Park, the separate Toronto Catholic District School Board (TCDSB), and the secular Toronto District School Board (TDSB). Public elementary schools in the neighbourhood include:

- Joyce Public School (TDSB)
- Regina Mundi Catholic School (TCDSB)
- St. Charles Catholic School (TCDSB)
- Sts. Cosmas and Damian Catholic School (TCDSB)

TCDSB is the only public school board that operates a secondary school in the neighbourhood, Dante Alighieri Academy. TDSB does not operate a secondary school in the neighbourhood, with TDSB secondary school students residing in southern Yorkdale–Glen Park attending institutions in adjacent areas The French first language public secular school board, Conseil scolaire Viamonde, and it separate counterpart, Conseil scolaire catholique MonAvenir also offer schooling to applicable residents of Morningside, although they do not operate a school in the neighbourhood. CSCM and CSV students attend schools situated in other neighbourhoods in Toronto.

One private school serves the neighbourhood, Fieldstone Day School, established in 1997, boasts as Canada's only Cambridge School serving Junior kindergarten to Grade 12. Fieldstone is housed in the former C.B. Parsons Junior High School, which once housed Seneca College's Yorkdale Campus.

== Transportation ==
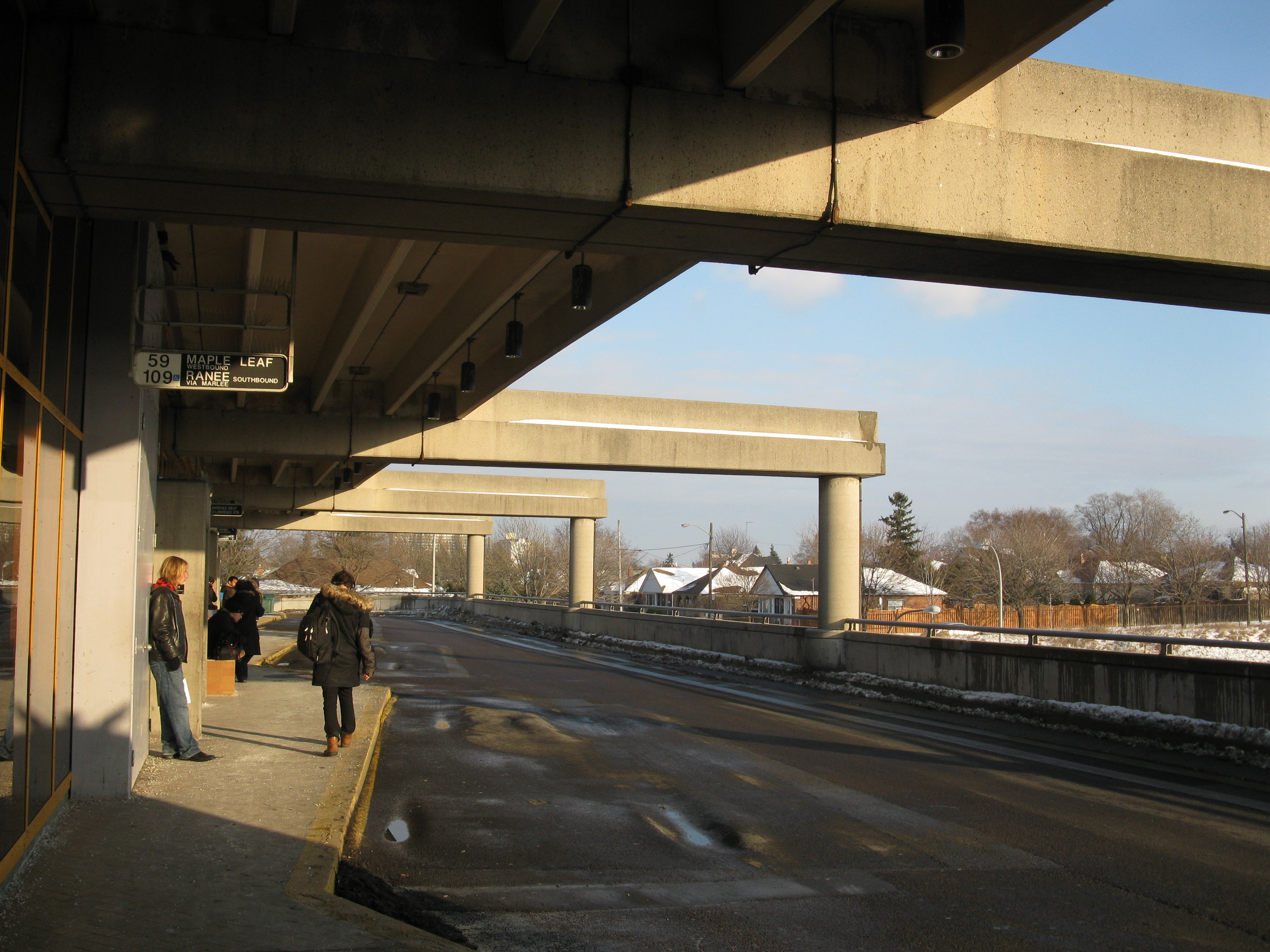
Lawrence West station is one of two Toronto subway stations in Glen Park.

Several major roadways serve as the boundary for Glen Park, Lawrence Avenue to the north, and Bathurst Street to the east. Other major thoroughfares that pass through the neighbourhood include Dufferin Street, and Allen Road. The portion of Allen Road within Glen Park is used as a controlled access highway.

Public transportation is provided by the Toronto Transit Commission (TTC), operating several buses in the neighbourhood, as well as two stations for the Toronto subway, Glencairn, and Lawrence West station. Both stations provide access to Line 1 Yonge–University. Bus routes operated by the TTC include 14 Glencairn, 29 Dufferin, 47 Lansdowne, 52 Lawrence West, 59 Maple Leaf, and 109 Ranee.
