= Dante Alighieri Academy =

Location
- 70 Playfair Avenue; North York, Ontario, M6B 2P9; Canada; 43.711039°N 79.4594629°W

Information
- School type: Catholic High school
- Motto: Character and Charity, Scholarship and Service
- Religious affiliations: Roman Catholic (Sisters of St. John the Baptist)
- Founded: 1974
- School board: Toronto Catholic District School Board (Metropolitan Separate School Board)
- Superintendent: Shawna Campbell; Area 3
- Area trustee: Maria Rizzo; Ward 5
- School number: 522 / 702935
- Principal: Caroline Falzon
- Vice Principals: Elvis Thomas; Claudia Grilo
- Grades: 9–12
- Enrolment: 785 (2026-2027)
- Language: English
- Colours: Red, White, and Yellow
- Team name: Dante Monarchs
- Public transit access: TTC: North/South: 29 Dufferin, 929 Dufferin Express; 14 Glencairn, 18 Caledonia, 52 Lawrence West, 59 Maple Leaf, 952 Lawrence West Express; Rapid Transit: Lawrence West
- Parish: St. Charles Borromeo
- Specialist High Skills Major: Arts & Culture; Business; Health and Wellness
- Program Focus: Broadbased Technology; Elite Athletes/Arts
- Website: www.tcdsb.org/o/dantealighieri

Dante Alighieri Academy (Dante Alighieri, DAA, or Dante, official name: Dante Alighieri Catholic Academy) also known as Dante Alighieri Academy Catholic Secondary School is a Catholic public high school in Toronto, Ontario, Canada. Administered by the Toronto Catholic District School Board (TCDSB), it serves the Glen Park neighbourhood in the North York district. It has 785 students from grades 9–12 as of the 2026–27 school year. A new building was opened on September 2nd 2026, at 70 Playfair Avenue. The new school features bright, modern classrooms, a triple gymnasium, a tech shop, specialized science spaces, music and performance areas, outdoor amenity spaces, and collaborative learning commons. It was founded in 1974 by the Sisters of St. John the Baptist, and is named after Dante Alighieri, a major Italian poet of the Middle Ages in the 13th century.

== History ==
The school was founded in September 1974 in cooperation with the Sisters of St. John the Baptist, St Charles Borromeo Roman Catholic Church and the Metropolitan Separate School Board (now known as the Toronto Catholic District School Board) to serve the predominantly Italian-Canadian community in the Dufferin-Lawrence neighbourhood with 180 students and nine teachers inside two portables and one portapak. The permanent three-storey building was erected in 1976 and the first addition was built in 1979. In 2005, the school constructed a 10,000 sq. ft. auditorium designed by Global Architects Inc.

Today the school serves over 1000 students serving the Lawrence Heights neighbourhood. Unlike primary and junior high schools, the TCDSB does not condition admission to its secondary schools on meeting its "Catholicity requirements"; the school's population is diverse and student body consists of Italians, Portuguese, Filipinos, White, Hispanic, Eastern Asians, and many others.

Due to overpopulation of the school, with the school building being medium-sized and students teaching classes in 20 portables, the school's grade 9 students were relocated to the former Bathurst Heights Secondary School in 2006 until 2011 when the school moved to the old Sir Sanford Fleming Academy as the students of that school was renamed to John Polanyi Collegiate Institute in the old Bathurst building. The campus became known as Beatrice Campus, named after Beatrice Portinari.

In 2011, the Toronto Catholic District Board received provincial funding to reconstruct Dante Alighieri Academy's outdated facilities. This culminated when Villa Charities, the owner of the Columbus Centre and the TCDSB announced a joint venture in December 2012 to build a new joint-use 400,000 sq. ft. school building expected to open in 2019. The announcement has met with controversy and opposition within the community protesting against the proposed demolition of the 1980s apartment building being redeveloped. As a result, the province rejected the proposed plan and the TCDSB severed ties with Villa Charities.

However, the replacement Dante school is expected to be built on the nearby Regina Mundi property with the existing Dante building converted into an elementary school. The school is now temporarily relocated to the former Don Bosco Catholic Secondary School in Etobicoke starting in the 2021–22 school year.

On September 2, 2026, the university officially opened. The new school is said to feature bright, modern classrooms, a triple gymnasium, a tech shop, specialized science spaces, music and performance areas, outdoor amenity spaces, and collaborative learning commons.

== Academics and programs ==
Dante Alighieri is home to the board's Deaf And Hard Of Hearing program consisting of 30 students. The school also offers various programs such as arts, technological studies, English, Mathematics, science and guidance.

== Notable alumni ==
- Malin Akerman – actress
- DerHova – music producer and founder of the electronic music duo Temperance
- Richie Laryea – professional soccer player for Major League Soccer (MLS) club Toronto FC and the Canada men's national soccer team
- Melissa Pagnotta – Olympic taekwondo athlete; competed for Canada in the women's 67 kg event at the 2016 Summer Olympics
- Gavin Smellie – two-time Olympic sprinter; competed for Canada in the men's 4 × 100 metres relay at the 2012 Summer Olympics and the men's 100 metres at the 2020 Summer Olympics

== See also ==
- Education in Ontario
- List of secondary schools in Ontario
