= Lawrence Heights =

Coordinates: 43.719°N 79.450°W

- Neighbourhood
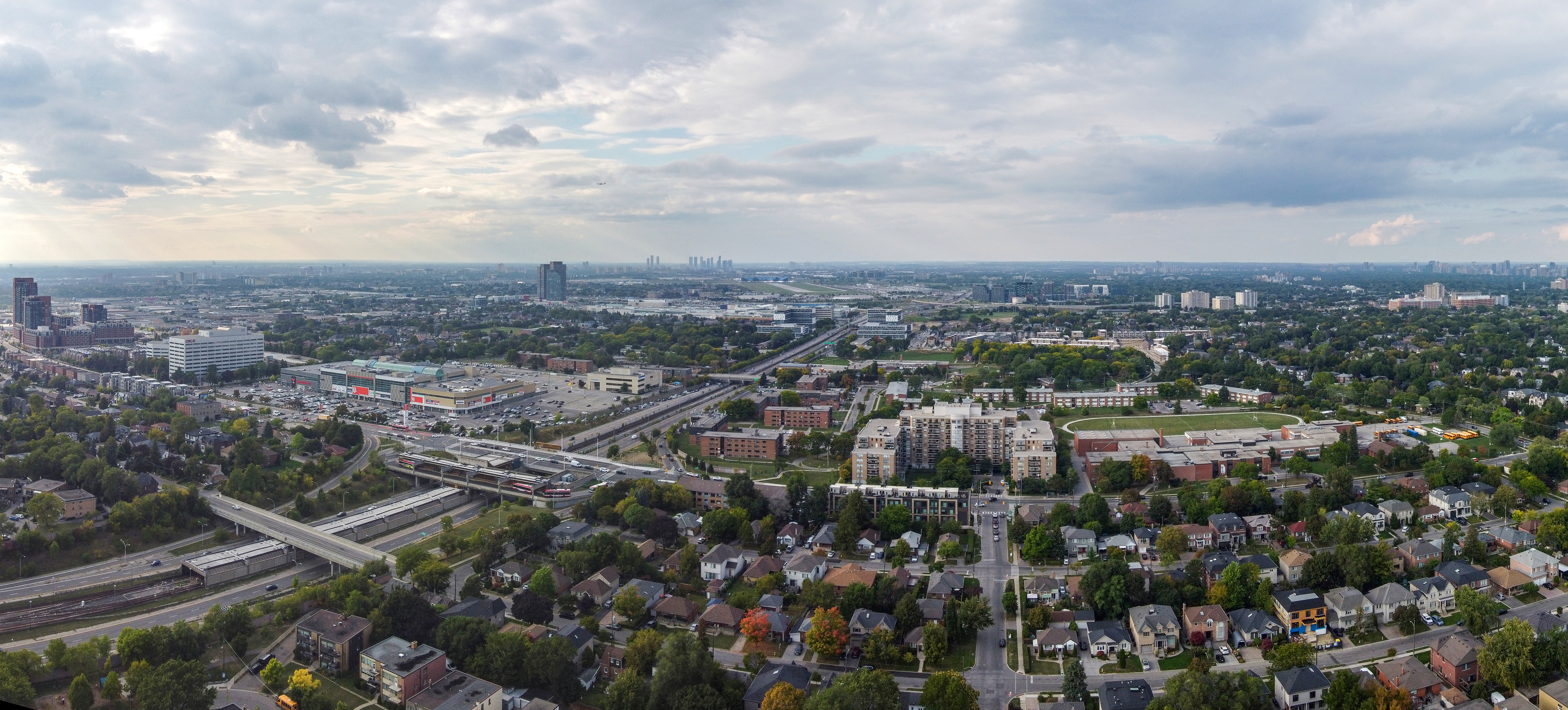
- Aerial view of Lawrence Heights in 2025

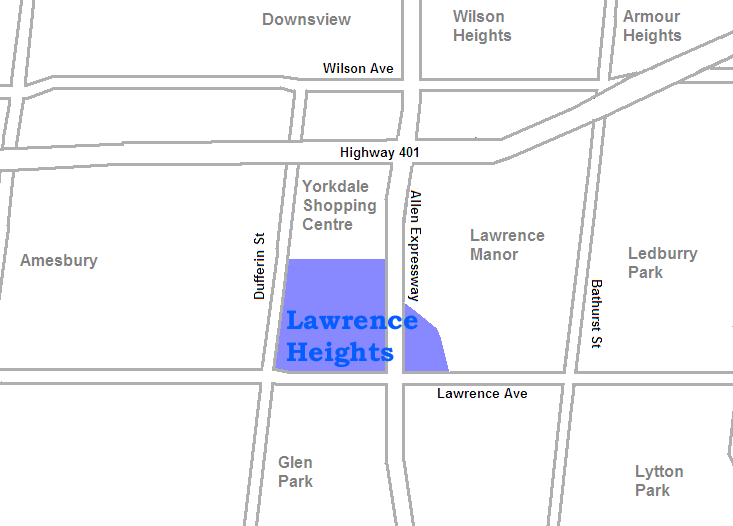
- Country: Canada
- Province: Ontario
- City: Toronto
- Municipality established: 1850 York Township
- Changed municipality: 1922 North York from York Township
- Changed municipality: 1998 Toronto from North York

Lawrence Heights is a neighbourhood in Toronto, Ontario, Canada. It is located north-west of central Toronto, in the district of North York. The neighbourhood is roughly bounded by Lawrence Avenue to the south, Yorkdale Road to the north, Varna Drive to the east and Dufferin Street to the west. It is part of the greater Yorkdale-Glen Park official Toronto neighbourhood.

The area is divided into two distinct subsections. One half of the neighbourhood is a post World War II development of bungalows and storey-and-a-half dwellings. As the frontage of these homes averages 45 feet, the area has seen significant changes as older houses are torn down and replaced by "monster homes" as the area's proximity to major city arteries and the downtown core makes it lucrative for builders. The other housing area, which is east of Flemington Road, is short-term public housing. Because of the area's proximity to Downsview Airport, high-rise buildings were not originally permitted to be constructed in this area, and the majority of the housing is in low to mid-rise buildings.

The neighbourhood is famously known for its reference in Toronto rapper Drake's song 'Jungle.'

== History ==
Lawrence Heights was the first large public housing project built by Metropolitan Toronto outside of the then-City of Toronto and is now managed under Toronto Community Housing. By 1955, 100 acres (40 ha) had been assembled by Metro. The project would have approximately 6,000 residents in 1,081 family units at a density of 12 families per acre, the largest public housing project to that date in Canada. When the project was announced, it sparked a strong opposition from the then North York Township. Citizens and elected officials threatened legal action to block the development. A compromise was worked out between Metro and North York whereby some of the units would be rented at market rates so that the project would not be exclusively very poor families. Construction was completed by 1962. It consisted mainly of row houses and maisonettes with some small apartment buildings of less than 30 units each. A buffer of single-family dwellings was built between the project and the private sub-division to the east. An elementary school was part of the project. The elementary school filled up immediately and senior elementary students were sent to a neighbouring junior high. A controversy erupted over the use of the swimming pool at a neighbouring secondary school, whereby project students could only use the pool on one or two evenings per week. A community center was built in the mid-1960s, its $100,000 cost shared by North York and Metro without any support from the Ontario or the federal housing agency Canada Mortgage and Housing Corporation.

Lawrence Heights has been referred to as the "Jungle" by residents and police alike soon after its completion in 1962. The Globe and Mail article "Toronto's new murder capital" gives insight into the crime in the area: "It's like you're in the jungle. It is like a war," says Linkx, a 20-year-old hip hop producer from nearby Rexdale who wears Crip colours and spoke on condition of anonymity.

In 2007, then city councillor Howard Moscoe unveiled a plan to revitalize Lawrence Heights. The plan proposes a demolition of all 1,208 units in the neighbourhood, as well as Lawrence Square, and they would be replaced by modern affordable units, market housing and retail/commercial streets, including a northward extension of Marlee Avenue. The plan was objected by nearly all surrounding neighbourhood residents due to overcrowding and the added traffic congestion it would bring. As of late 2015, the low rise housing units at Ranee Avenue and Flemington Road (along with a vacant lot) are being demolished for a new condo project (Yorkdale Condos).

In 2015, the city kicked off a large redevelopment project in the area. The aim is to transform one of the city’s largest public housing communities into a mixed-income neighbourhood.

== Education ==
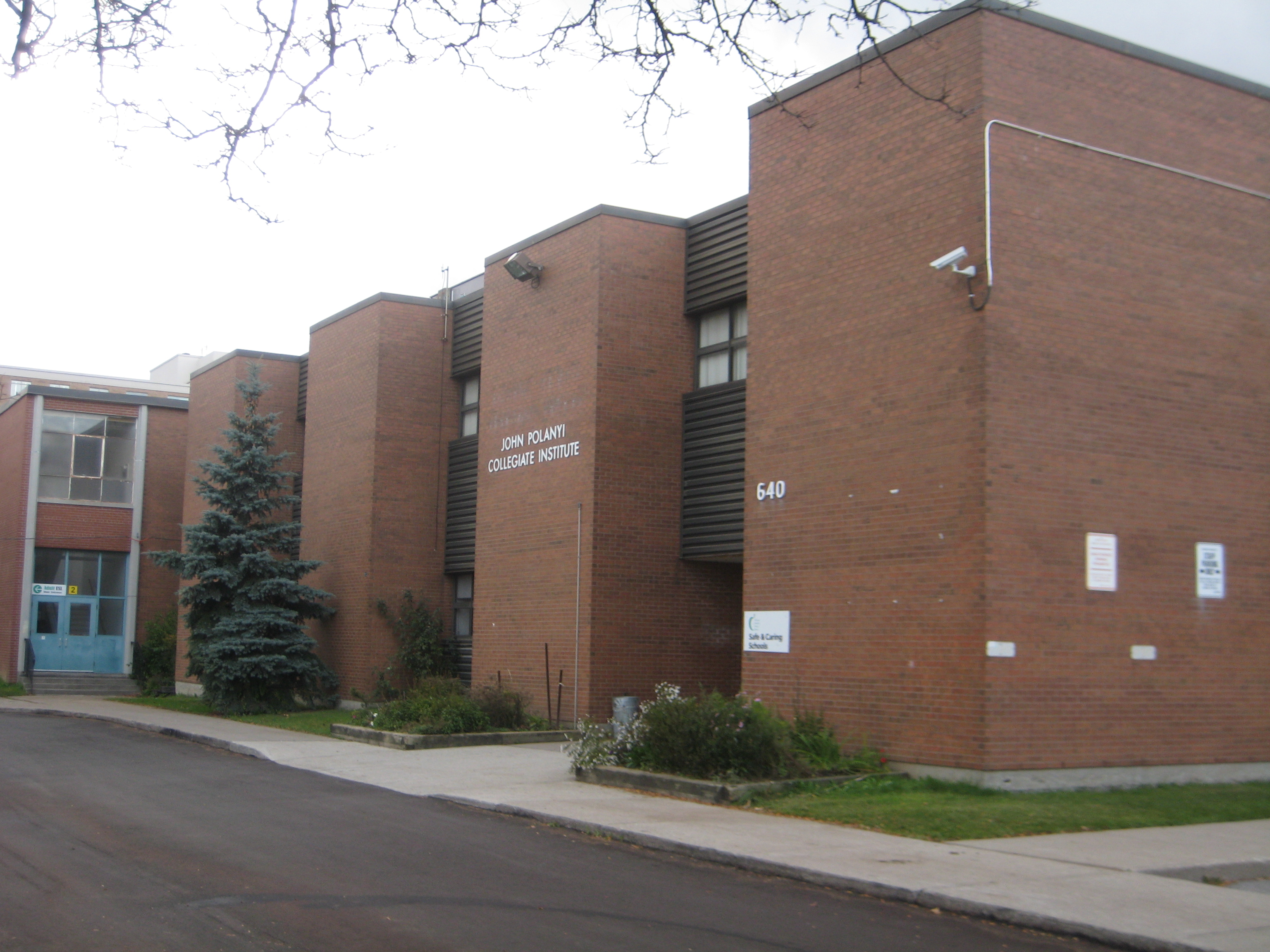
John Polanyi Collegiate Institute is a public secondary school in Lawrence Heights.

The Toronto District School Board (TDSB) is a secular English first language public school board that operates schools in the neighbourhood. TDSB operates two institutions that offer primary education, Flemington Public School, and Lawrence Heights Middle School; as well as one secondary school, John Polanyi Collegiate Institute. The secondary school is situated in the former building of Bathurst Heights Secondary School, before it was shut down by TDSB. The building was also the temporary site for the public secondary separate school, Brebeuf College School, when Brebeuf underwent restorations. The present secondary school was reopened in 2011.

In addition to TDSB, Conseil scolaire catholique MonAvenir (CSCM), Conseil scolaire Viamonde (CSV), and the Toronto Catholic District School Board (TCDSB) also offer schooling to applicable residents of Lawrence Heights, although they do not operate a school in the neighbourhood. Applicable students residing in Lawrence Heights attend schools situated in other neighbourhoods in Toronto. CSCM and TCDSB are separate school boards, the former being a French first language school board, the latter being an English first language school board; whereas CSV is a secular French first language school board.

== Recreation ==
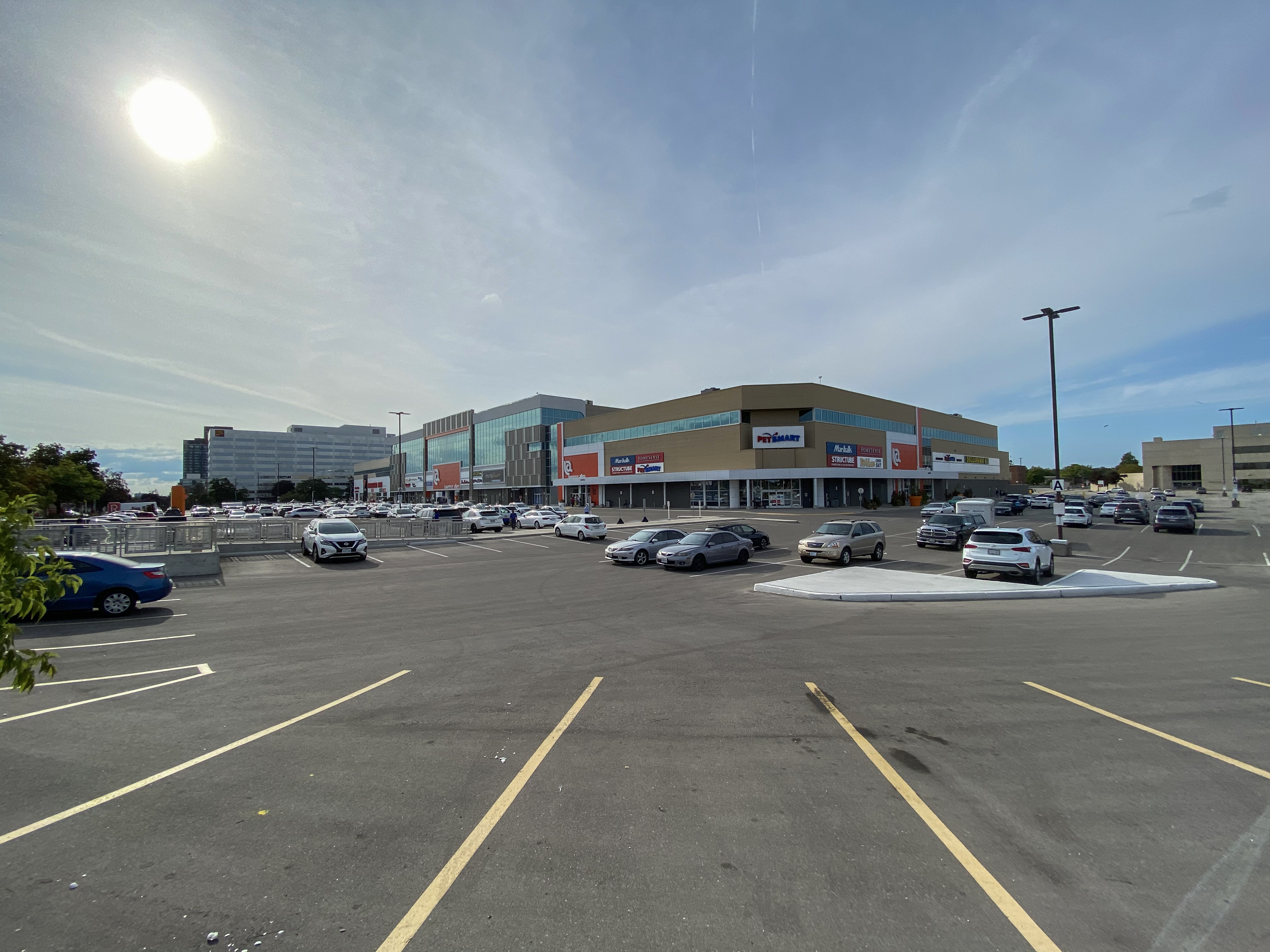
Lawrence Allen Centre is a shopping mall located in Lawrence Heights.

Several municipal parks are located in Lawrence Heights, including Flemington Park, Ranee Park, Varna Park, and Yorkdale Park. Parks in the neighbourhood are managed by the Toronto Parks, Forestry and Recreation Division. In addition to municipal parks, the division also manages a community centre in the neighbourhood, Lawrence Heights Community Centre.

Two large shopping centres in Toronto are also situated in Lawrence Heights, Lawrence Allen Centre, and Yorkdale Shopping Centre, to the north of the neighbourhood.

== Transportation ==
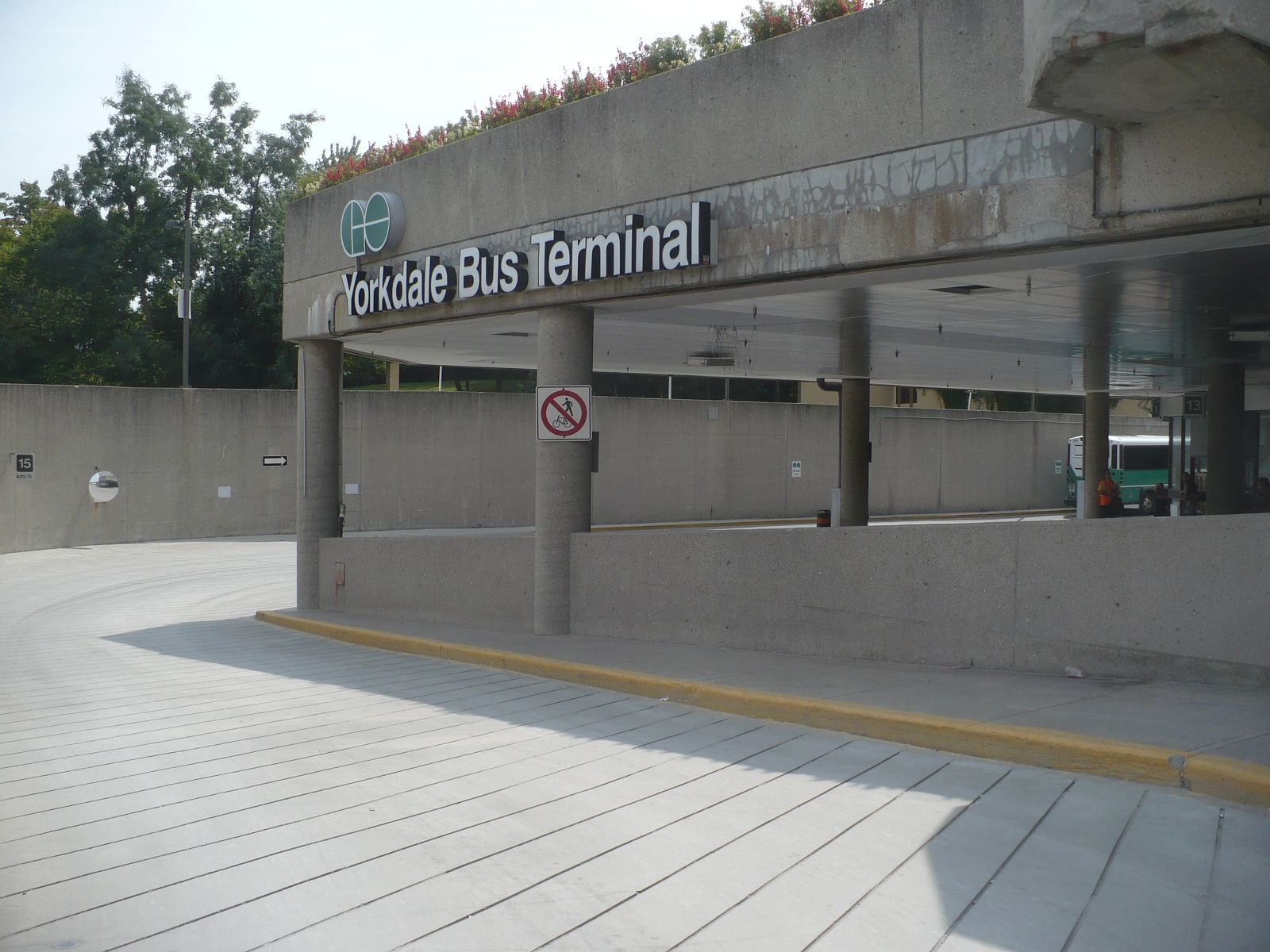
Yorkdale Bus Terminal is a regional commuter bus terminal operated by GO Transit.

Several major roadways serve as the neighbourhood's boundaries, with Lawrence Avenue to the south, and Highway 401 to the north. Highway 401 is a major east-west controlled access highway. A portion of another controlled access highway, Allen Road, bisects the neighbourhood.

Public transportation in the neighbourhood is provided by the Toronto Transit Commission (TTC), including several bus routes, and the Toronto subway. Two stops for Line 1 Yonge–University of the Toronto subway are located in the neighbourhood: Lawrence West station and Yorkdale station, located near Yorkdale Shopping Centre. In addition to local TTC bus routes, regional commuter buses operated by GO Transit may be accessed from Yorkdale Bus Terminal. Several other private bus operators can also use the terminal, including Ontario Northland Motor Coach Services.

== Notable residents ==
- Donovan Bailey, track and field sprinter, Olympic gold medalist
- Dolo, rapper and member of the group Ghetto Concept
- Kevin Maguire, played in the National Hockey League with the Toronto Maple Leafs, Buffalo Sabres, and Philadelphia Flyers.
- Ben Johnson, is a Canadian former sprinter.
- Ali Ahmed, is a Canadian professional soccer player, who represents EFL Championship club Norwich City and the Canadian national team.
