= Lawrence West station =

Toronto subway station

Lawrence West
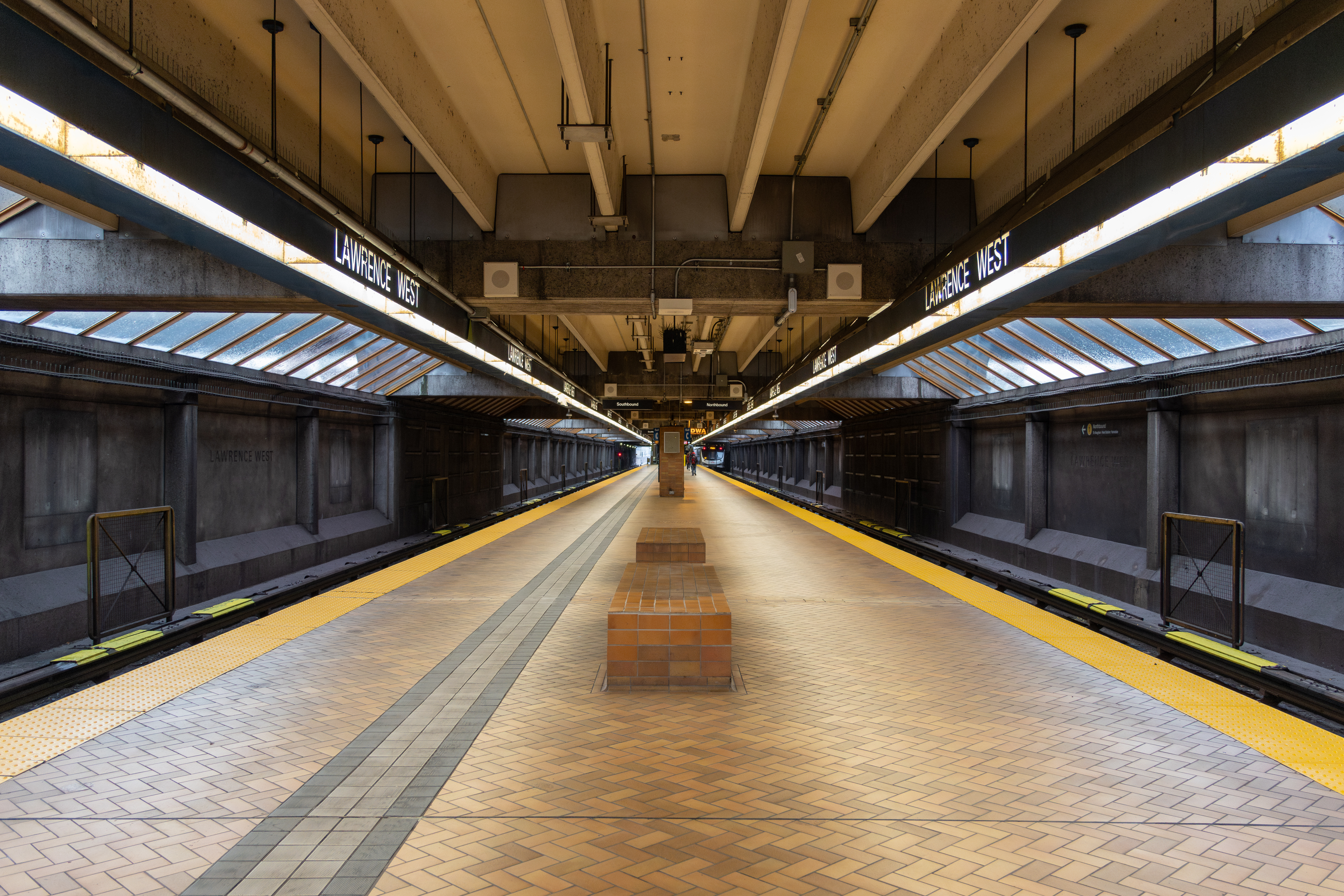

General information
- Location: 655 Lawrence Avenue West; Toronto, Ontario; Canada
- Coordinates: 43°42′55″N 79°26′38″W
- Platforms: Centre platform
- Tracks: 2
- Connections: TTC buses: 52 Lawrence West; 59 Maple Leaf; 109 Ranee; 352 Lawrence West; 400 Lawrence Manor Community Bus; 952 Lawrence West Express

Construction
- Structure type: At-grade in highway median
- Parking: None
- Accessible: Yes
- Architect: Dunlop Farrow Aitken

Other information
- Website: Official station page

History
- Opened: 28 January 1978; 48 years ago

Passengers
- 2023–2024: 19,742
- Rank: 35 of 70

Services
Preceding station	Toronto Transit Commission	Following station
Yorkdale towards Vaughan	Line 1 Yonge–University	Glencairn towards Finch
Location

Lawrence West is a subway station on Line 1 Yonge–University in Toronto, Ontario, Canada. It is located in the median of William R. Allen Road at Lawrence Avenue West. The station serves the local communities of Lawrence Heights, Lawrence Manor and Glen Park, and nearby destinations such as the Columbus Centre, Lawrence Heights Community Recreation Centre and Lawrence Allen Centre.

== History ==
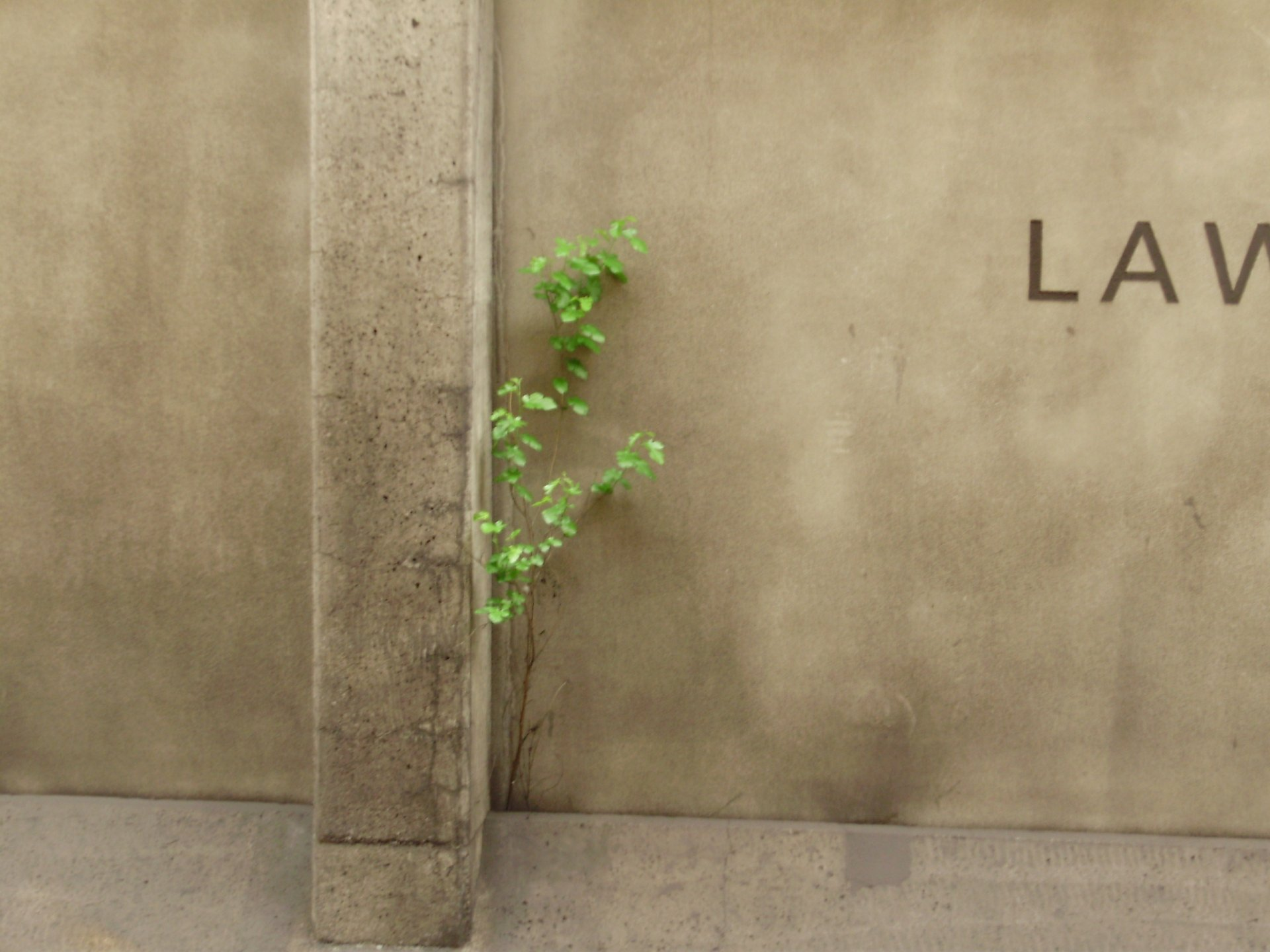
A green plant growing in the border area of Lawrence West station in 2008

The station opened in 1978, as part of the subway line extension from St. George to Wilson station.

In 2008, the Toronto Star reported this station, along with Lansdowne, Kennedy, and Warden to be a "known problem area" in terms of crime in the subway system.

In 2014, an elevator, automatic sliding doors and an accessible fare gate were installed in the main part of the station on the south side of Lawrence Avenue, to make the station wheelchair accessible. In addition, repairs were made to the sawtooth bus platforms and the roadway was repaved for low floor buses. The northside entrance remains inaccessible due to space restrictions and generally used as drop off point by car.

On 6 January 2019, this station discontinued sales of legacy TTC fare media (tokens and tickets), previously available at a fare collector booth. Presto vending machines were available to sell Presto cards and to load funds or a monthly Metropass onto them.

On 5 April 2019, Lawrence West and Yorkdale stations became the first two locations to sell single-use Presto tickets, which are sold from the stations' Presto fare vending machines.

== Architecture and art ==
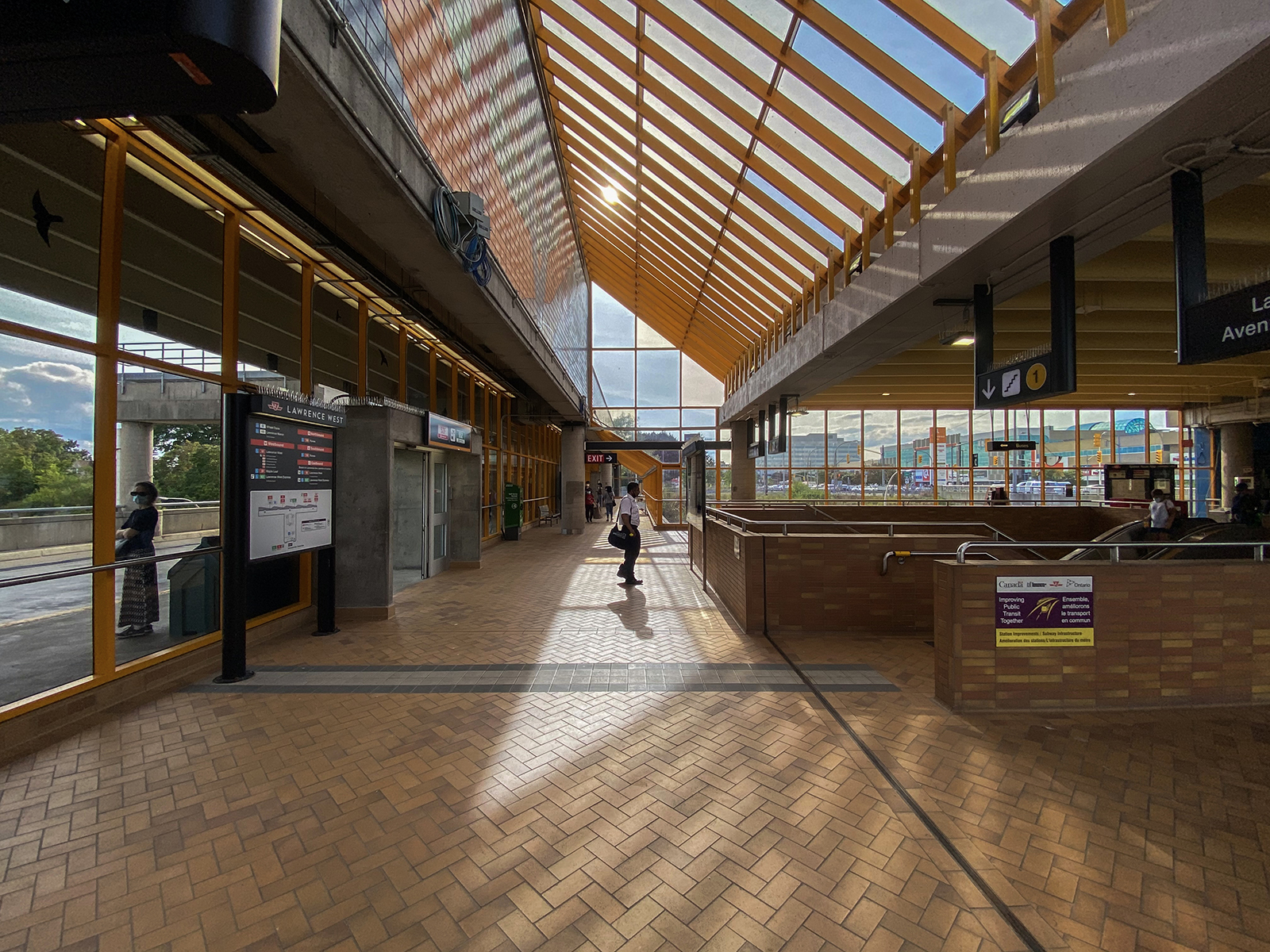
Main station skylight structure and bus platforms

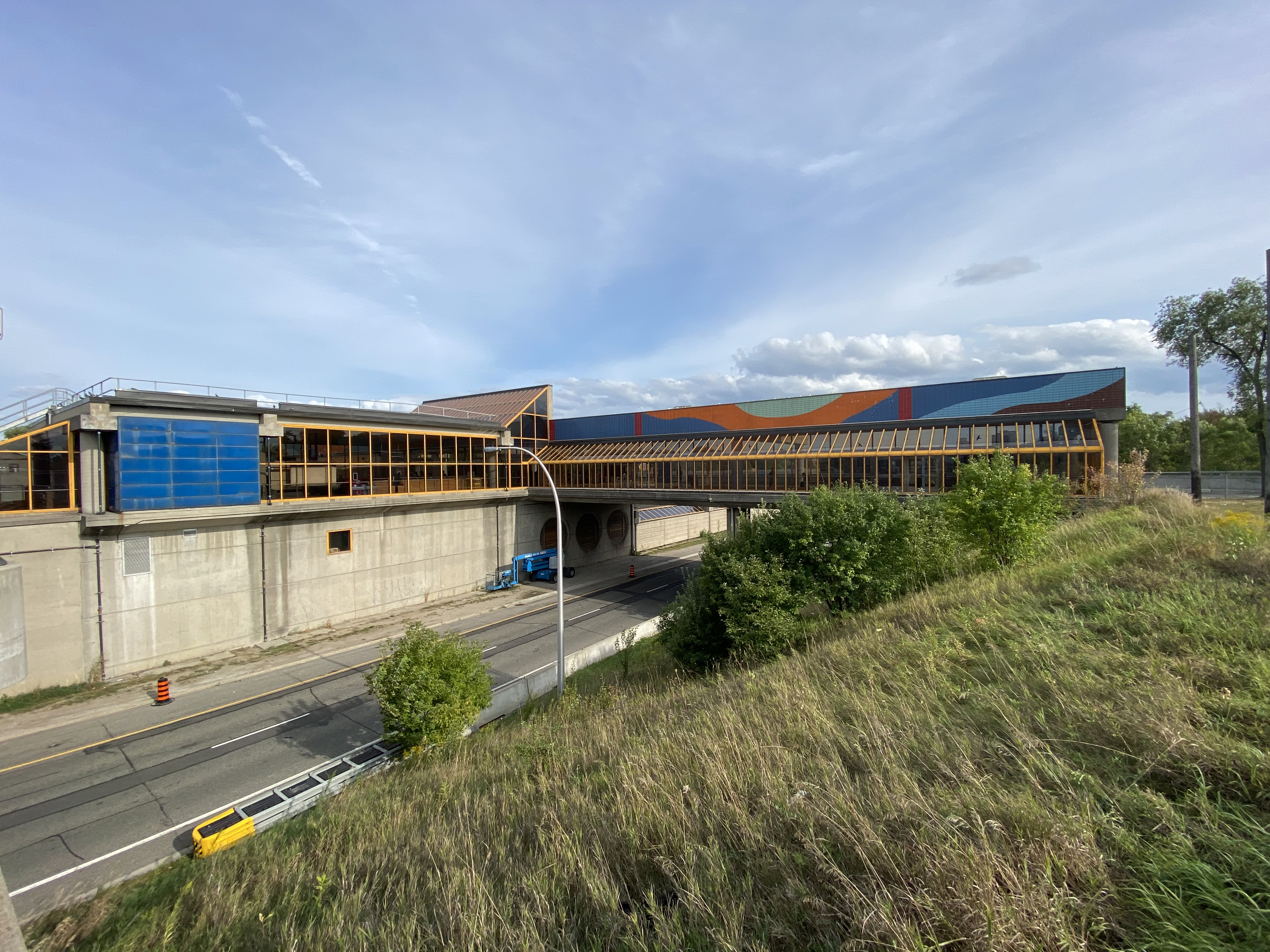
Main station structure and bus platforms, on the south side of Lawrence Avenue West, depicting Spacing... Aerial Highways

Dunlop Farrow Aitken was the firm responsible for the station's architecture. The structure is composed of an enclosed train platform area in the median of Allen Road, which is bridged by a bus loop and waiting area on the south side of the Lawrence Avenue bridge. Staffed entrances on both sides of the street connect to a transfer area which links the train platform and the bus area.

Upon entrance from the Lawrence Avenue bridge over Allen Road, the bus waiting area and the train platform are apparent. This openness is achieved through glazed walls and a large stairwell. The glass is framed with distinctive orange-painted metal. The platform level features exposed concrete walls, with a long strip of skylights above the tracks with the same orange framing used throughout the station. Rectangular prism benches with rectangular tiles of yellow, orange, and brown hues are unique to the station. Similar tiles are used on the floors and centre pillars.

Spacing... Aerial Highways, a large 300 foot ceramic tile mural designed by Claude Breeze, spreads across the north face of the main station building above the bus platform.

== Surface connections ==
When the subway is closed, buses use stops outside of the terminal along Lawrence Avenue West. TTC routes serving the station include:

Bay number	Route	Name	Additional information
1	Wheel-Trans		
1	400	Lawrence Manor	Community Bus; eastbound to Humber River Hospital; westbound to Bathurst Street and Wilson Avenue
1	109B	Ranee	Northbound to Neptune Drive via Flemington Road
1	109C	Ranee	Northbound to Neptune Drive via Varna Drive
2	109B/C	Ranee	Southbound to Cedarvale station via Marlee Avenue
2	59A	Maple Leaf	Westbound to Weston Road via Gary Drive
2	59B	Maple Leaf	Westbound to Weston Road via Church Street
3	952	Lawrence West Express	Westbound to Pearson Airport via Dixon Road (Rush hour service)
3	52F	Lawrence West	Westbound to Royal York Road
4	52A	Lawrence West	Westbound to Pearson Airport via Dixon Road
4	52B	Lawrence West	Westbound to Westwood Mall Bus Terminal via Dixon and Airport Roads
4	52D	Lawrence West	Westbound to McNaughton Avenue via Dixon and Airport Roads
5	52G	Lawrence West	Westbound to Martin Grove Road via The Westway (This station is the eastern terminus for this route.)

The following routes (eastbound only) can be boarded on-street outside the station entrance:

Route	Name	Additional information
52A/B/D	Lawrence West	Eastbound to Lawrence station
52F	Lawrence West	Eastbound to Sunnybrook Hospital via Lawrence station
352	Lawrence West	Blue Night service; eastbound to Sunnybrook Hospital and westbound to Pearson Airport
952	Lawrence West Express	Eastbound to Lawrence station (Rush hour service)
