= Lawrence Allen Centre =

Shopping mall in Toronto

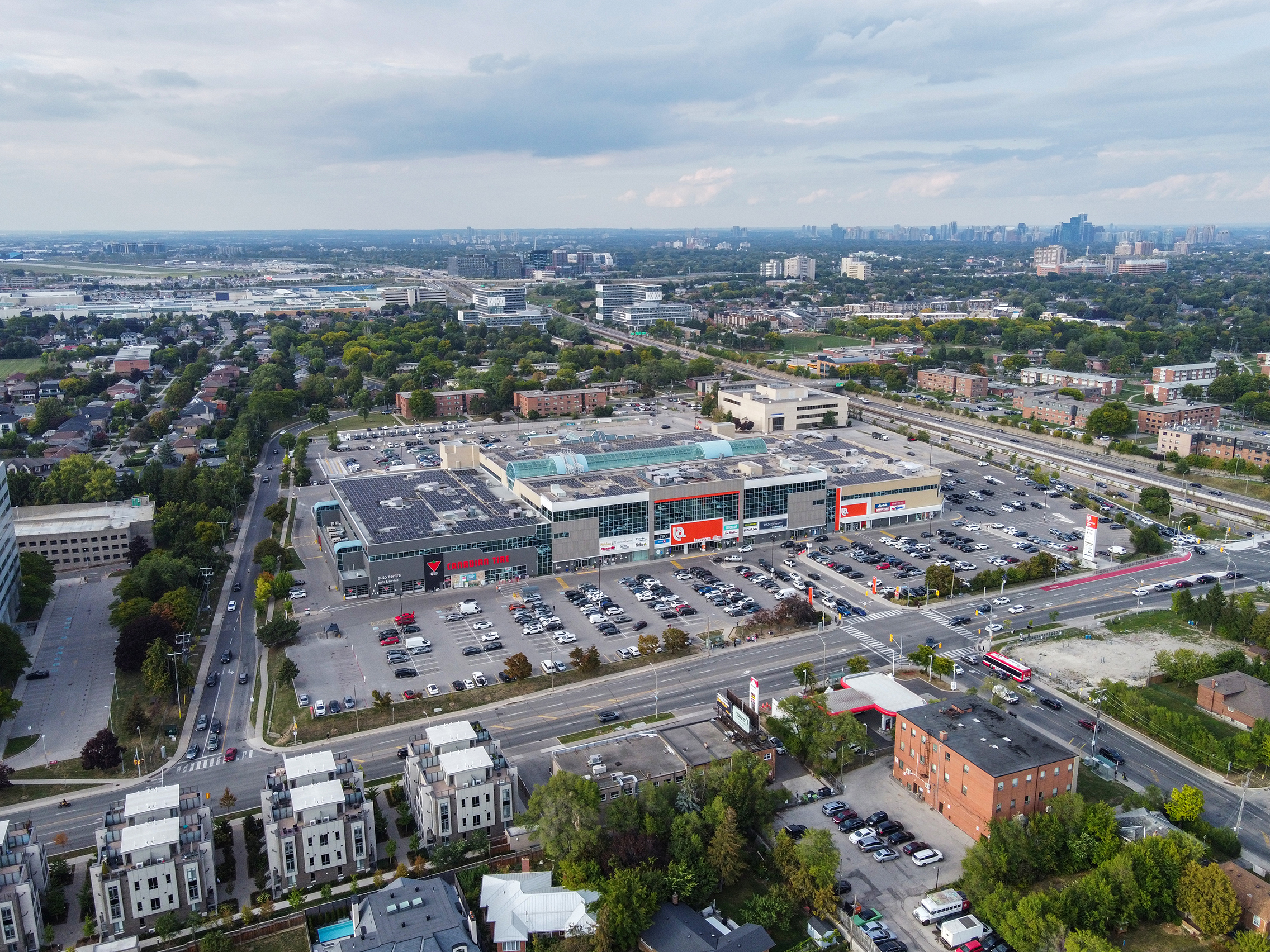
- Aerial view of Lawrence Allen Centre in 2025
- Coordinates: 43°43′0″N 79°26′50″W
- Address: 700 Lawrence Avenue West; Toronto, Ontario; M6A 3B4
- Opened: 1989
- Developer: RioCan Real Estate Investment Trust
- Manager: Julie M. Rinaldi
- Owner: RioCan Real Estate Investment Trust
- Num. of stores: 120
- Num. of anchor tenants: 6
- Floor area: 679,575 square feet (63,134.6 m^{2})
- Floors: 2 (Canadian Tire on 2 floors)
- Website: lawrenceallencentre.com

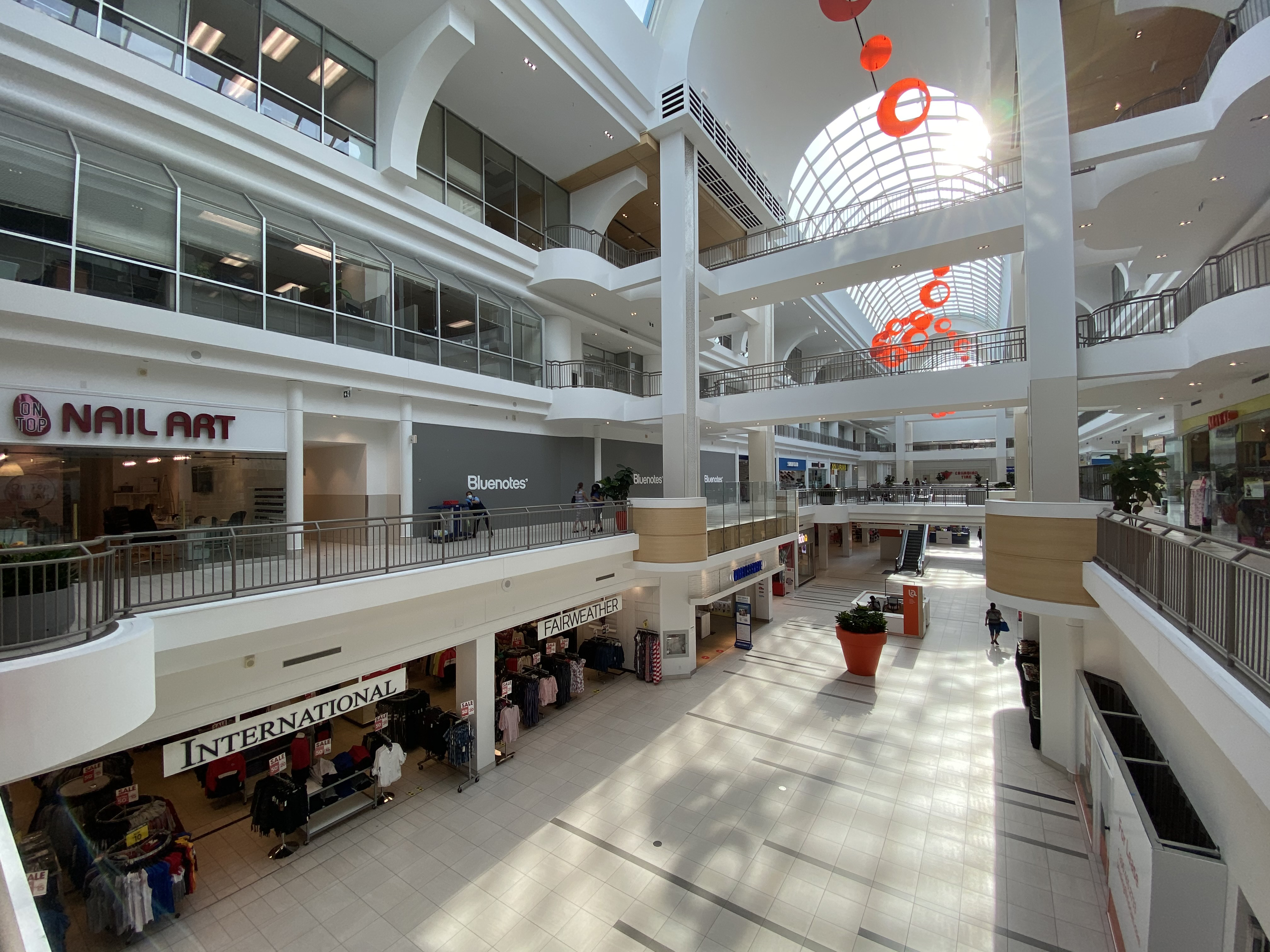
Interior of the mall in 2021; International Fairweather has been replaced with Toys "R" Us Express in late 2022, though Toys "R" Us itself later moved to a much larger space on the mall's second floor across from the food court in October 2023

The Lawrence Allen Centre, formerly Lawrence Square Shopping Centre, is a shopping centre located in Toronto, Ontario, Canada. Owned by RioCan, it is one of the city's twenty largest malls. It is located on Lawrence Avenue West, west of Allen Road, in the neighbourhood of Lawrence Heights, the district of North York. It is accessible from the Toronto Transit Commission's Lawrence West station, as well as via various bus routes. It is a terminating vista of Marlee Avenue.

Lawrence Allen Centre is 2.0 km south of Yorkdale Shopping Centre, making them one of the few suburban major shopping malls in Toronto to be in close proximity to each other, however they are not in direct competition due to each having a different mix of tenants. (Other pairs of closely-located malls including Cloverdale Mall and Sherway Gardens, and Bayview Village and Fairview Mall.)

== Tenants ==
The first two floors of the shopping centre are used for retail and the third and fourth floors are used for offices.

The anchor stores are Canadian Tire on the west side and Fortinos (Loblaw Companies Limited) on the northwest side. There was a Zellers on the east side, which became vacant in early 2013. There were plans to have Target Canada where Zellers was, albeit in a smaller format, but it was scrapped upon Target's exit from Canada and space remained vacant until April 14, 2016 when Marshalls and HomeSense (both owned by TJX Companies) and PetSmart moved in.

Payless ShoeSource was located on the lower floor next to the main entrance before it went out of business as a victim of the retail apocalypse. Its location has since been replaced with a BMO branch and a Pizzaville location.

Other major tenants include Dollarama, the Liquor Control Board of Ontario (LCBO), The Source, Showcase, Structube, and Value Village.

=== Food court ===
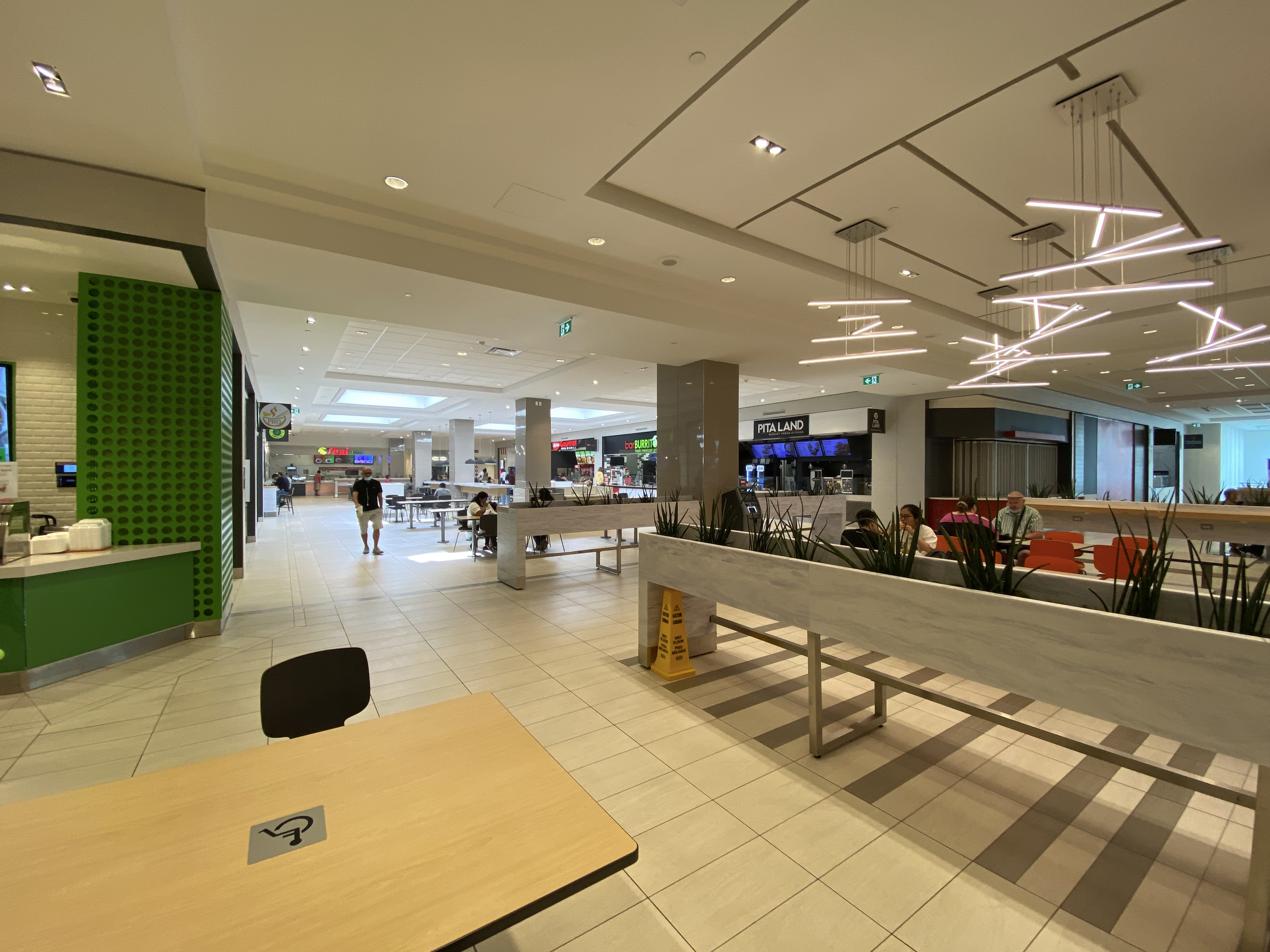
Food Court in 2021

Lawrence Allen Centre has a food court on the second floor, containing KFC and many small independent eateries and formerly had a McDonald's location.

== Renovations ==
When Zellers became defunct, there were renovations in its former space from 2015 to 2016 to accommodate Marshalls, HomeSense, and PetSmart.

Lawrence Square's redevelopment began in September 2017 and was completed in phases by the end of 2018. The transformation consisted of the two levels of retail, the expansion of the food court, and new public washrooms.

Lawrence Square Shopping Centre was renamed as Lawrence Allen Centre on October 3, 2019, as part of the mall's 30th anniversary.

The first floor had a converted retail unit across from Fortinos, Rio Play, which consisted of two small indoor artificial turf soccer fields serving the local community and was named after and owned by the mall's operators. Rio Play has since been replaced by the LCBO.

== Site redevelopment ==
=== Old plan ===
As part of the 20-year plan to redevelop Lawrence Heights that began in 2007 by local city councillor Howard Moscoe, Lawrence Square was planned to be demolished to make way for a northward extension of Marlee Avenue and for public housing.

Two nearby public schools were planned to be demolished to make way for retail uses.

=== New plan ===
Later on, councillor Moscoe retired. The new councillor, Josh Colle, conducted more rounds of community consultation. The city no longer aims to demolish Lawrence Allen Centre; instead, the new plan is to leave the mall in place for good.

== See also ==
- List of shopping malls in Toronto
