= Yorkdale station =

Toronto subway station

Yorkdale
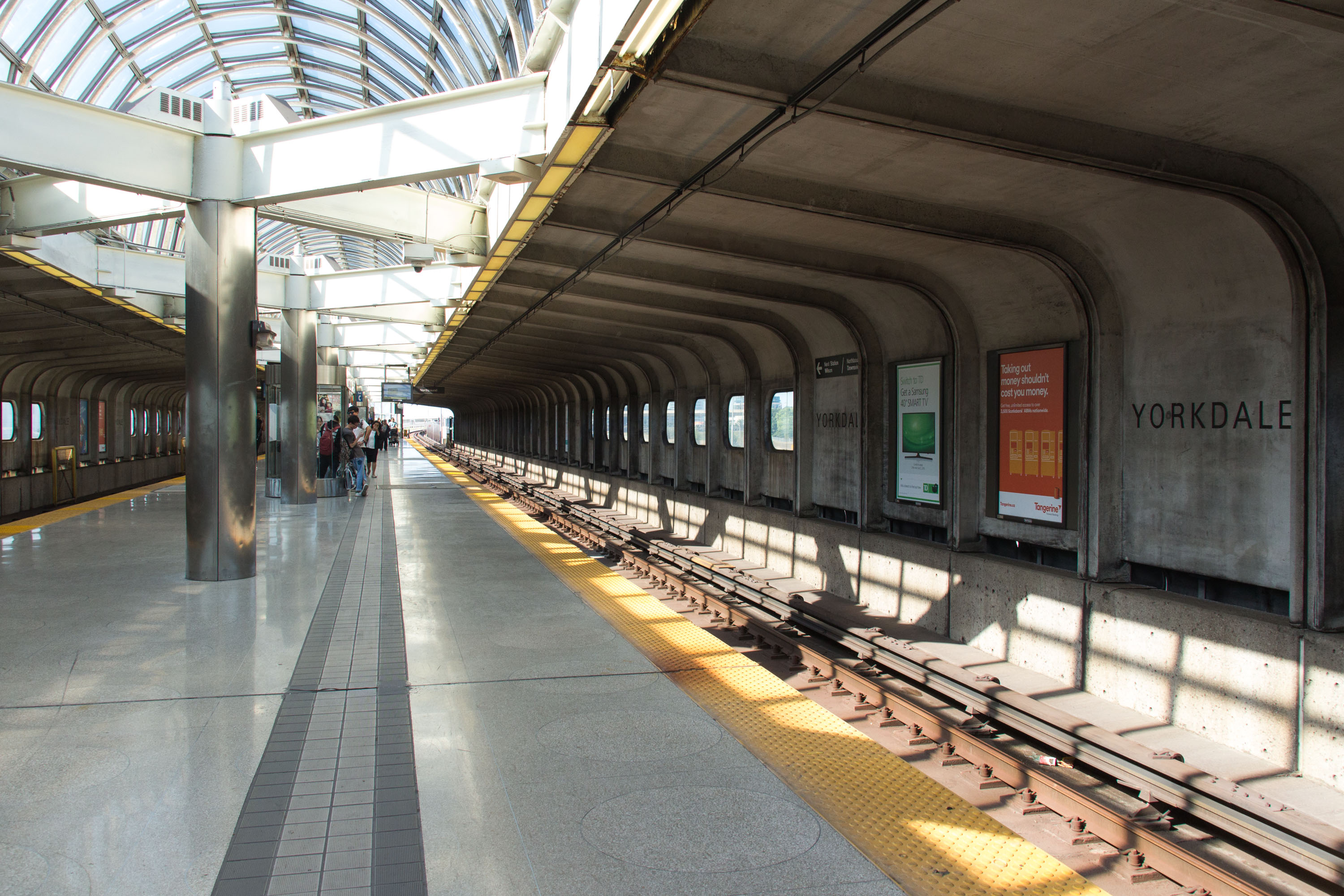

General information
- Location: Yorkdale Road at Yorkdale Service Road, Yorkdale Shopping Centre, Toronto, Ontario; Canada
- Coordinates: 43°43′29″N 79°26′51″W
- Platforms: Centre platform
- Tracks: 2
- Connections: TTC buses: 47 Lansdowne; 109 Ranee; Yorkdale Bus Terminal

Construction
- Structure type: At grade
- Parking: 1,010
- Accessible: Yes
- Architect: Arthur Erickson

Other information
- Website: Official station page

History
- Opened: 28 January 1978; 48 years ago

Passengers
- 2023–2024: 19,725
- Rank: 36 of 70

Services
| Preceding station | Toronto Transit Commission | Following station |
|---|---|---|
| Wilson towards Vaughan | Line 1 Yonge–University | Lawrence West towards Finch |
Location

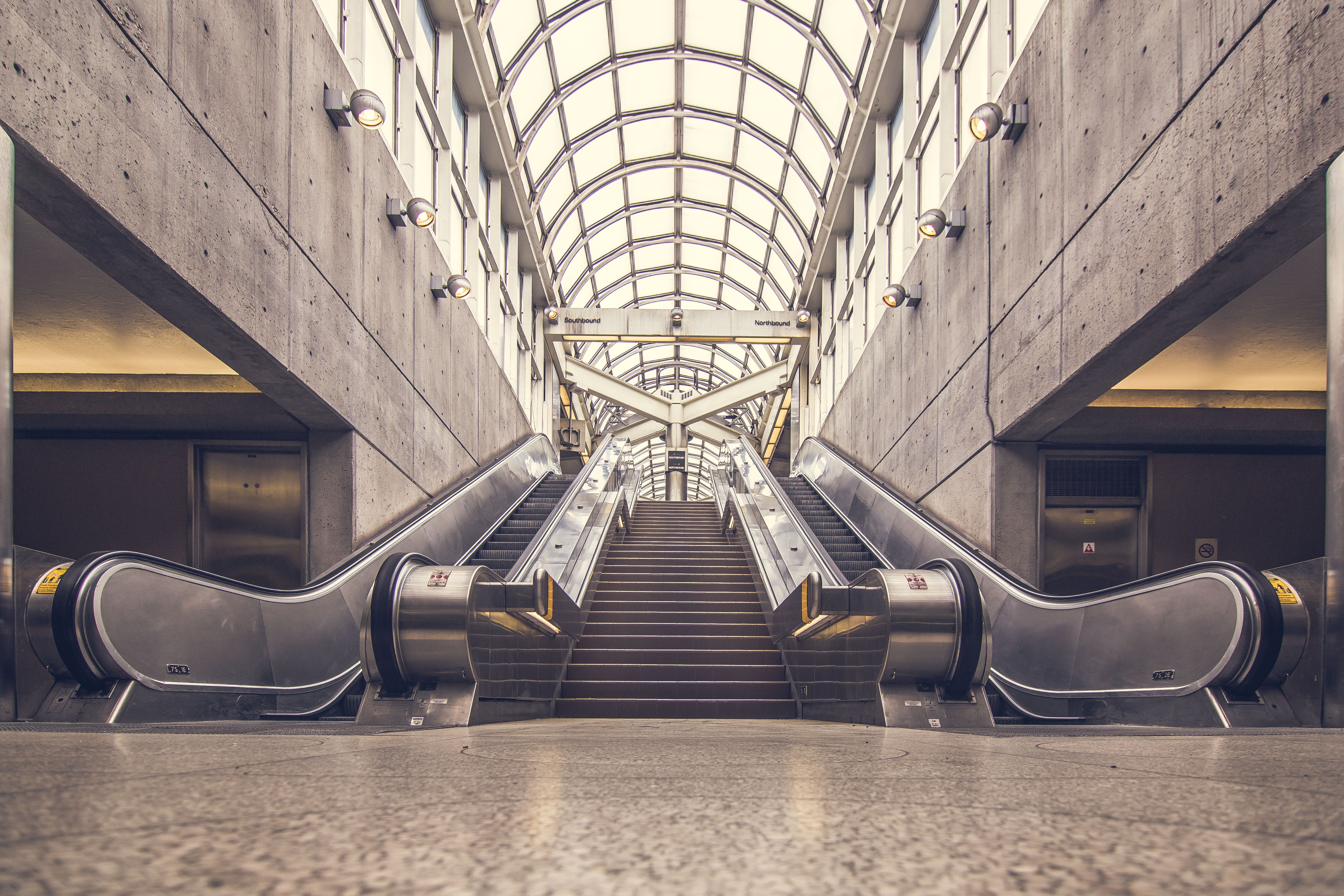
Escalators to the platform from Ranee Avenue entrance

Yorkdale is a Toronto subway station on Line 1 Yonge–University in Toronto, Ontario, Canada. It is located in the median of the William R. Allen Road just south of Highway 401. Opened in 1978, the station is named after the nearby Yorkdale Shopping Centre, to which it is connected by an enclosed walkway.

Connections to GO Transit and intercity buses, such as Ontario Northland, are available at Yorkdale Bus Terminal, immediately west of the station.

== Entrances ==
- Yorkdale Mall west entrance, next to Yorkdale Bus Terminal
- Ranee Avenue and Allen Road, south entrance (unstaffed entrance)
- Onramp to Highway 401 and Allen Road, north entrance

== Architecture and art ==
Yorkdale was designed by Arthur Erickson. The station is above ground, and also above street level. It has two tracks: northbound and southbound, and has a centre platform. A dramatic vaulted glass roof spans the length of the single centre platform. It terminates symmetrically at escalators and stairs at both ends of the platform, creating the appearance of a glass dome. The interior walls of the station at platform level are unfinished concrete, but artistically cast, and curve over the tracks to form the ceiling. The shape of the windows on these walls recalls the oval windows of subway trains. On the exterior, these concrete walls are clad with stainless steel.

Handrails on stairs leading to the platform are backlit. Platform shelters are unique to the station, designed in the oval shape which dominates many features in the station, with large windows. Like the centre pillars which hold X-shaped structural supports—distinctive in Toronto's rapid transit system to the station—they are clad in unpainted metal panels.

Yorkdale station won a Governor General's Award for Architecture in 1982.

The station's glass roof originally featured an artwork by Michael Hayden—also responsible for the Sky's the Limit installation at Chicago's O'Hare International Airport—called Arc en ciel (French for "rainbow"). This piece consisted of a large number of mercury-vapour lamps painted in various colours that would light in a pattern, running along the station in the appropriate direction whenever a train went through. In the mid-1990s, it stopped working because of damaged transformers caused by water leakage. Each transformer would have cost just $28 to repair at the time; however, because the TTC had not budgeted for its continued maintenance, it was removed at the artist's request.

At a TTC meeting in September 2010, a deal was made for Oxford Properties, owner of Yorkdale Mall which connects to the station, to pay for the restoration of the installation. The plan calls for the rebuilt piece to use LED lights, allowing for a broader range and customization of colours and patterns. Hayden requested that a maintenance contract be included, and for the piece installed by a Toronto-based company. The cost of such a reinstallation was not known (the original installation cost $100,000) until 13 July 2016, when it was revealed that the Oxford Properties would pay for much of the $500,000 cost to re-install the art installation, with some of the funds being from a pool dedicated to community improvements.

== History ==
In late 2013, the entrance at Ranee Avenue was altered: the south and north driveways were removed, and curb was added to run parallel with the support pillars. Buses no longer drop passengers off directly at the doors. This project was completed in conjunction with resurfacing of Ranee to remove asbestos and the future construction of residential buildings along Allen Road on the south side of Ranee.

In January 2014, the parking structure connected to the subway, which could accommodate 1144 cars, was demolished for mall expansion. Construction of a new parking structure was delayed to coincide with the opening of Nordstrom and eventually opened in February 2017, with 1,010 spaces.

On 6 January 2019, this station discontinued sales of legacy TTC fare media (tokens and tickets), previously available at a fare collector booth. Presto vending machines were available to sell Presto cards and to load funds or a monthly Metropass onto them.

On 5 April 2019, Lawrence West and Yorkdale stations became the first two locations to sell single-use Presto tickets, which are sold from the stations' Presto fare vending machines.

In 2022, an elevator and automatic sliding doors were installed in the main part of the station on the south side of Yorkdale Road to make the station wheelchair accessible. In addition, repairs were made to the concourse and a new ramp was built, connecting the street entrance north of the station for people using wheelchairs connecting to and from GO Transit buses. The Ranee Avenue and pedestrian bridge entrances beside the Yorkdale Bus Terminal remain inaccessible due to space restrictions and are generally used as a mobility hub for the Yorkdale Shopping Centre, where an additional elevator is placed.

== Subway infrastructure in the vicinity ==
South of Yorkdale station, Allen Road descends into a shallow open cut below the surrounding ground level, and the subway descends with it until Cedarvale station. North of Yorkdale, the tracks remain elevated and cross Highway 401 to Wilson station.

== Surface connections ==
=== Toronto Transit Commission ===
A transfer is required to connect between the subway and surface bus routes.

TTC routes serving the station include:

| Route | Name | Additional information |
|---|---|---|
| 18A | Caledonia | Southbound to Caledonia station via Bridgeland Avenue |
| 18B | Caledonia | Southbound to Caledonia station via Orfus Road (Rush hour service) |
| 109B | Ranee | Northbound to Neptune Drive and southbound to Cedarvale station via Flemington Road and Marlee Avenue |

== In popular culture ==
Yorkdale station was used as the Transit Hub station in the film The Last Chase (1981) because of its futuristic look. The station also appears in both Scanners (1981) and Overdrawn at the Memory Bank (1983).
