= Allen Road =

Municipal expressway in Toronto, Canada

Allen Road
- William R. Allen Road
- Allen Road highlighted in red

Route information
- Maintained by City of Toronto
- Length: 7.3 km (4.5 mi)
- History: Proposed during the 1950s as the Spadina Expressway, initial sections completed in 1964, completed to Eglinton in 1976

Major junctions
- South end: Eglinton Avenue
- Highway 401
- North end: Kennard Avenue (continues as Dufferin Street)

Location
- Country: Canada
- Province: Ontario
- Major cities: Toronto

Highway system
- Toronto municipal expressways
(by date opened)
| ← Don Valley Parkway (1961) | Allen Road (1964) |
Ontario municipal expressways
(in alphabetical order)
| ← Airport Parkway | Allen Road | Black Creek Drive → |

Allen Road, formally known as William R. Allen Road, is a short municipal expressway and arterial road in Toronto, Ontario, Canada. It starts as a controlled-access expressway at Eglinton Avenue West, heading north to just south of Transit Road, then continues as an arterial road north to Kennard Avenue, where it continues as Dufferin Street. Allen Road is named after Metro Toronto chairman William R. Allen and is maintained by the City of Toronto. Landmarks along the road include the Lawrence Heights housing project, Yorkdale Shopping Centre and Downsview Park, and Downsview Airport. A section of the Line 1 Yonge–University subway is located within the median of the expressway from Eglinton Avenue to north of Wilson Avenue.

The portion south of Transit Road was originally constructed as part of the Spadina Expressway project. The Spadina was proposed in the 1950s as a north–south freeway, intended to connect downtown Toronto to the suburbs of North York and to serve the Yorkdale Shopping Centre project; it was only partially built before being cancelled in 1971 due to public opposition. Initially proposed in the 1950s as part of a network of freeways surrounding Toronto, its cancellation in 1971 ended proposals for other proposed expressways into and around Metro Toronto. Despite this, extensions were opened south to Eglinton in 1976 and north to Kennard Avenue in 1982.

In 1983, the Province of Ontario, the City of Toronto and the government of Metropolitan Toronto (Metro) agreed to a land transfer that saw a strip of land south of Eglinton, as well as the right-of-way for the proposed expressway, transferred to the city in exchange for the fully-constructed arterial extension of Highway 400 now known as Black Creek Drive. Various proposals since to extend Allen Road south of Eglinton—either above or below ground—have never gained traction, and the route remains a backlogged stub of the original proposals. Despite this, the decision to cancel the Spadina—and by extension similar expressways into downtowns—has been regarded as one of the defining moments of urban planning in Canada.

== Route description ==
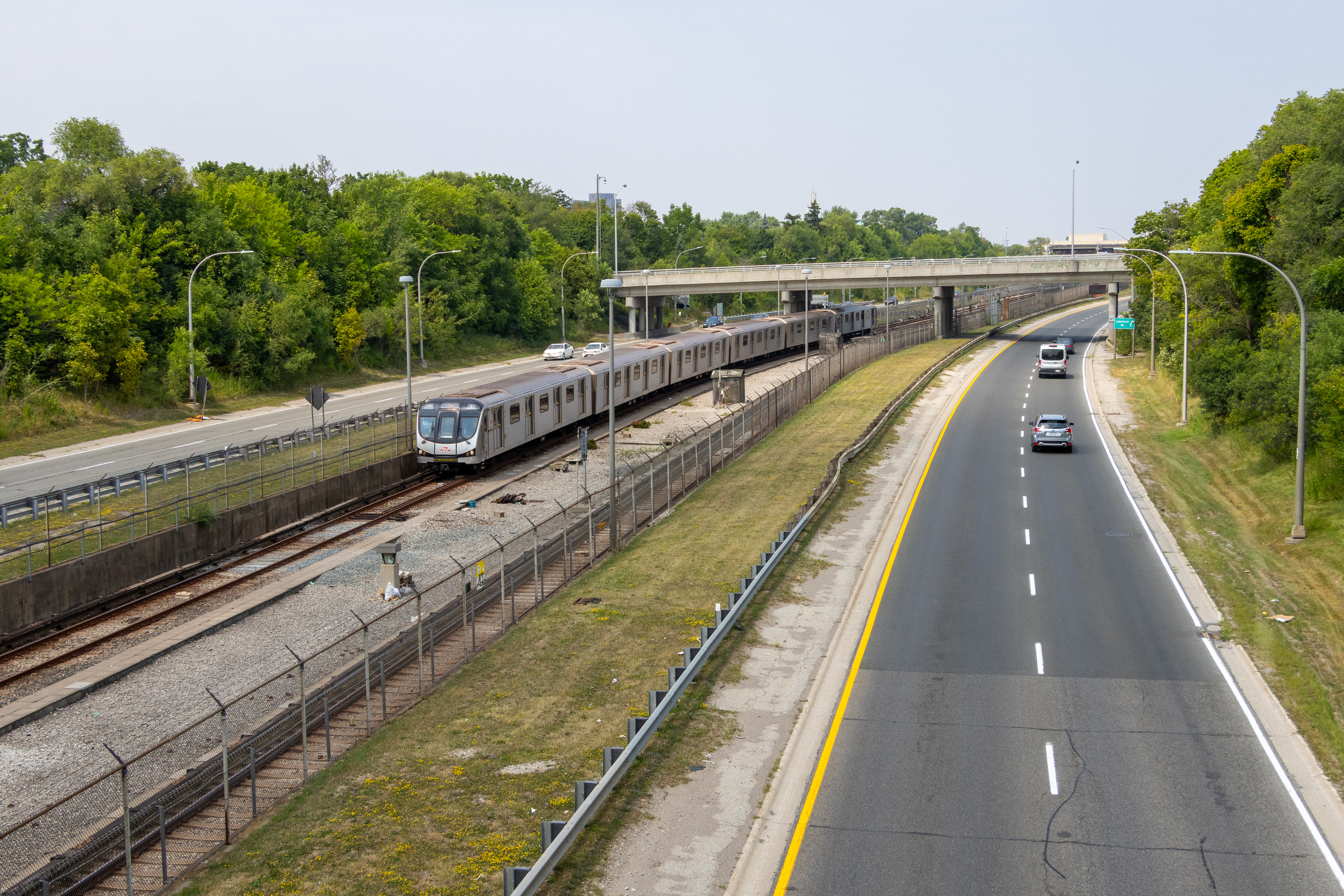
Allen Road, looking north from Glencairn Avenue

Allen Road is a 7.3-kilometre (4.5 mi) road located within Toronto. The four-to-eight lane route connects Eglinton Avenue West with Kennard Avenue, north of which the roadway continues as Dufferin Street. It is classified by the City of Toronto as an expressway from Eglinton Avenue to Transit Road and as a major arterial from Transit Road to Kennard Avenue. As such, bicycles and pedestrians are prohibited on the route south of Transit Road. The outermost lanes of Allen Road from Sheppard West station north to Kennard Avenue are high-occupancy vehicle lanes (HOV).

Allen Road begins at Eglinton Avenue West with two separate signalized intersections serving the opposing directions of travel on the expressway. The northbound lanes intersect Eglinton Avenue West to the east of Cedarvale station, while the two southbound lanes connect to Eglinton Avenue west of the station. It proceeds north to Lawrence Avenue West as a four-lane expressway with a speed limit of 80 km/h (50 mph) in the northerly direction until 500 m (1,600 ft) north of Eglinton Avenue.

The tracks of the Line 1 Yonge–University subway are situated between the carriageways in a 15-metre-wide (49 ft) right-of-way, with each station's TTC bus terminal also being located between them. The roadway intersects with Lawrence Avenue West, with the ramps to and from each carriageway meeting at a set of traffic lights. North of Lawrence Avenue, the route is eight lanes, with a speed limit of 80 km/h (50 mph). Ramps connect to and from Yorkdale Road, flanking Yorkdale station between them.

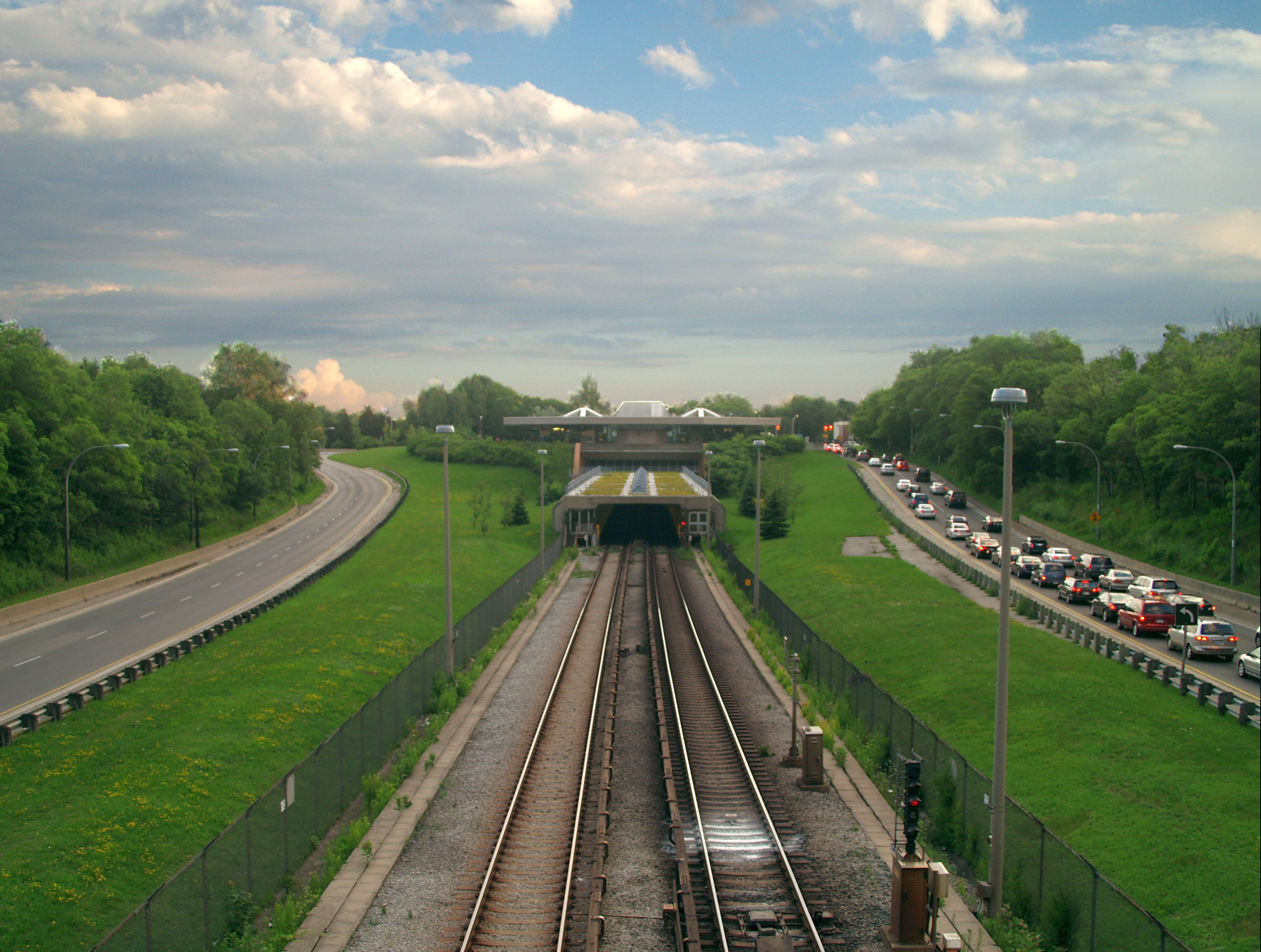
Allen Road at Eglinton Avenue West; southbound traffic is often queued as far back as Lawrence Avenue during morning peak travel times

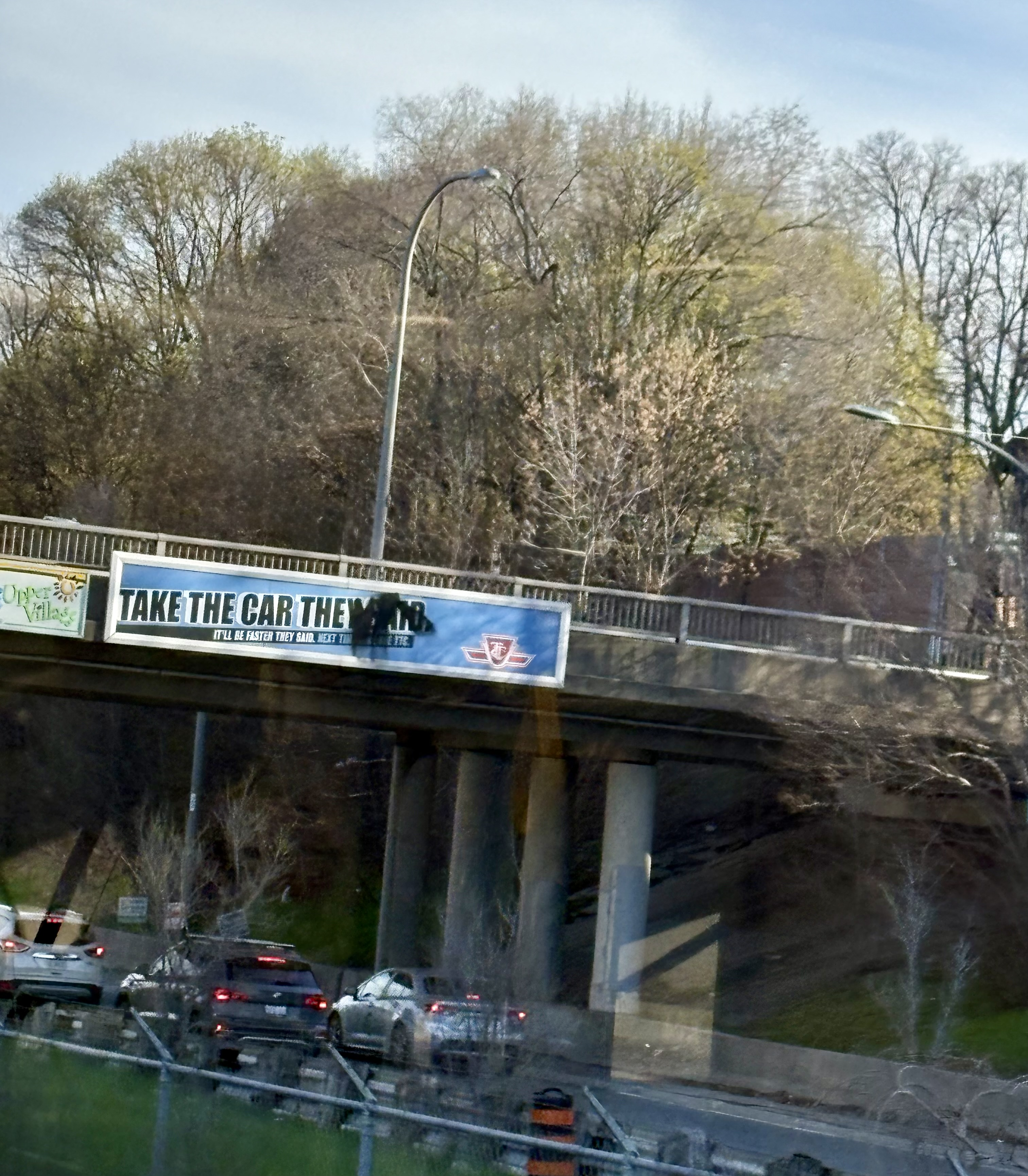
Tongue-in-cheek TTC ad, partly vandalized, on a southbound overpass before Eglinton where traffic is usually backed up, that reads "Take the car they said. It'll be faster they said. Next time take the TTC."

The Allen proceeds on bridges over the lanes of Highway 401, with ramps from the Allen to Highway 401 passing overhead. The interchange also serves to connect Yorkdale Road with Highway 401. The exit from the northbound Allen to Highway 401 serves as a ramp to both directions of Highway 401, with two lanes proceeding north of Highway 401. Similarly, two lanes are provided southbound over Highway 401, and access from the eastbound and westbound 401 merges with the Allen south of Yorkdale Road. Access to Yorkdale Road from the eastbound 401 is provided at the partial Dufferin Street interchange to the west. The southbound ramp from the Allen to the eastbound 401 flies over the whole interchange and connects with the eastbound 401 collector lanes. The subway is situated on bridges over Highway 401 between the northbound and southbound lanes.

North of Highway 401, the Allen is four or six lanes. It passes over Wilson Avenue, with Wilson station being above the namesake avenue within the median of Allen Road, and meets with Transit Road at a signalized intersection. The subway diverges from the route just north of Wilson Avenue, where there is a large subway yard and bus garage known as Wilson Yard, to the west of the road. Just south of Transit Road is a partial interchange with Wilson Heights, the former northern terminus of the road until 1982.

North of Transit Road, Allen Road is an arterial road with four or six lanes. It features a concrete barrier between the opposing lanes north to a signalized intersection with Sheppard Avenue West. The speed limit along Allen Road through this section is 70 km/h (43 mph). It continues north, with signalized intersections at Rimrock and Kennard Avenue. The road becomes Dufferin Street north of Kennard Avenue.

=== Cameras ===
Road Emergency Services Communications Unit (RESCU) cameras are found on the roadway in nine locations:

- Eglinton
- Elmridge
- Viewmount
- Glengrove
- Lawrence West
- Highway 401
- Transit Road
- Sheppard Avenue West
- Finch Avenue West

== History ==
=== Spadina Expressway ===
The Spadina Expressway was one of several intraurban freeways proposed in the 1950s to crisscross Toronto. It was intended to carry commuter traffic from the Toronto suburbs north of Highway 401 into the downtown of Toronto, via the Cedarvale and Nordheimer Ravines and Spadina Road. Various versions of the proposal showed it starting to the north of North York at today's highway 407, between Bathurst and Dufferin Streets. It then travelled south to meet highway 401 a half-mile east of Dufferin. It was cancelled due to public opposition, although not before the northern section was started and the expropriation of a number of homes.

The interchange at Highway 401 evolved to a complex three-level turbine design featuring 26 bridges, the most-complex in Canada at the time. At the same time, Highway 401 was being widened from four lanes into a twelve-lane highway. From Highway 401 south to Eglinton, the roadway was to be in a trench, with the rapid-transit line in the middle. South of Eglinton, it continued into the Cedarvale Park below ground level. Plans were initially for the road to be on the surface of the ravines and the subway below the surface as far as Spadina Road, with a tunnel under St. Michael's College north of St. Clair. Another plan projected the roadway to be completely underground through this stretch, on top of the subway line. From Spadina Road south of St. Clair, the roadway would be underground to its end at Davenport Road.

Various proposals for the Spadina south of Bloor Street were made. The 1969 functional design proposed an express route in the centre of Spadina Avenue, and parallel two-lane service roads on either side to provide access to properties. Other proposals included no highway south of Sussex Street, near Harbord Street.

=== 1943–1961: Planning for the route ===
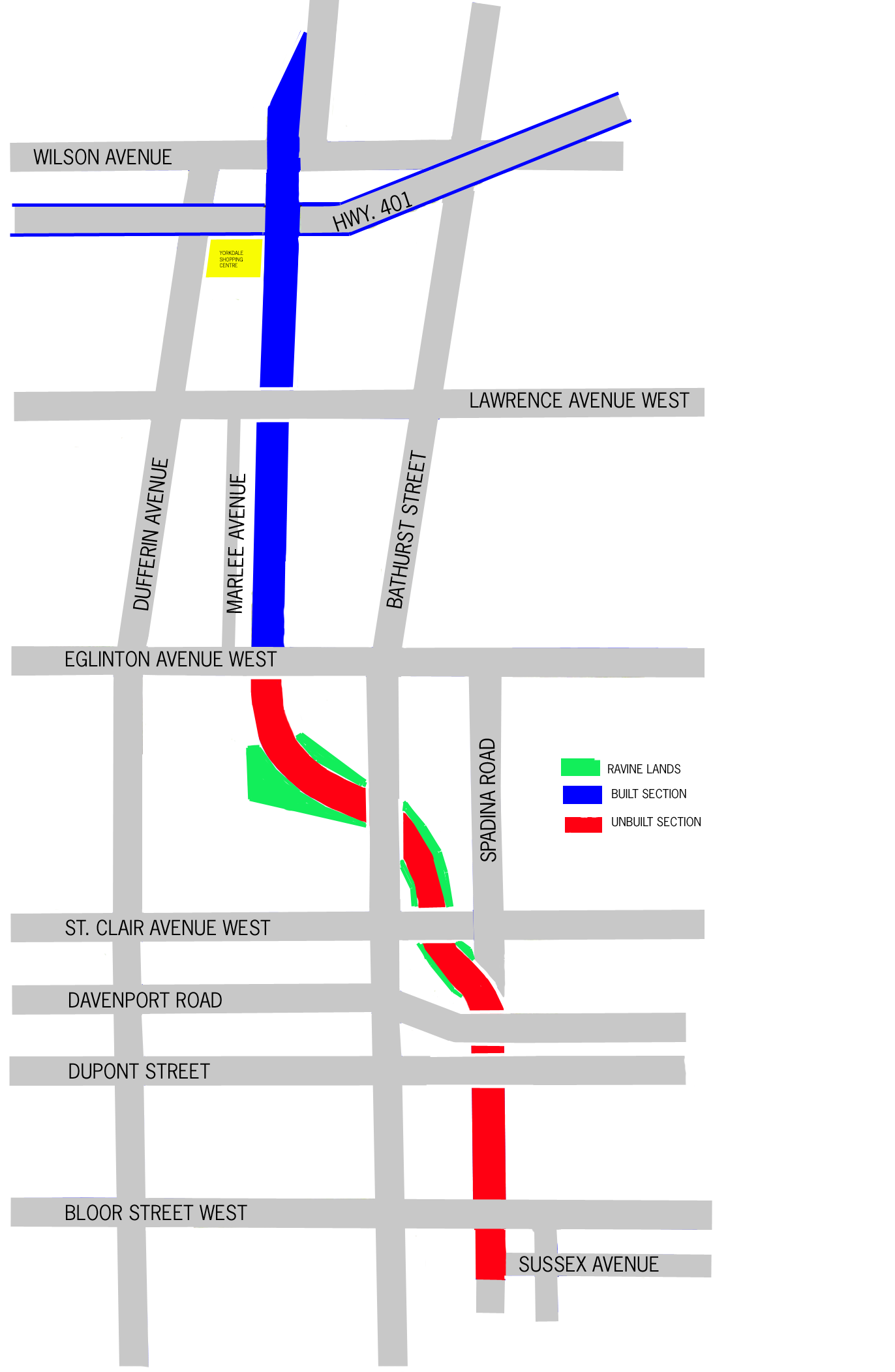
Approved route of Spadina Expressway

By the 1940s, urban development extended past the boundaries of Toronto. It was recognized within the planning department that the farmland surrounding the city would soon be developed. In 1943, the City of Toronto Planning Board developed a plan for the area within a nine-mile radius of Yonge Street and Queen Street. It included a network of superhighways, one of which followed a similar routing to the future Spadina Expressway proposal.

In November 1947, the City of Toronto Civic Work Committee approved a plan submitted by the Toronto City Planning Board for two new arterial roads: one running east–west along the lakeshore named the Waterfront Highway and another running north–south to the west of downtown. The north–south route entailed construction of a new road from Front Street to St. Clair Avenue along the route of the existing Spadina Avenue and Spadina Road. The jog at Bloor Street connecting the two existing roads would be straightened and a new cut of the Davenport Road escarpment would be made, adjacent to Casa Loma. The proposal was added to the January 1, 1948, municipal election, where it was narrowly approved by voters 34,261 to 32,078. While the proposal was adopted, the narrow approval led councillors to hold off on approval of construction.

A proposal for a highway from the northwest to downtown was developed in 1949 by the Toronto and Suburban Planning Board, part of a plan for numerous expressways in the Toronto area, including the "Lakeshore Expressway" (the eventual Gardiner Expressway) and Don Valley Parkway. It was to be named "North West Drive", or the "Spadina Road Extension". The route was laid out by two members of the board, future Metro chairman Fred Gardiner and James P. Maher, chairman of the Toronto Planning Board. The proposal died when York Township rejected the idea.

Shortly after Metropolitan Toronto (Metro) was formed in 1953, it proposed building "superhighways" into and out of downtown, as well as encircling the downtown with an "expressway ring". The routes of the Lakeshore and Don Valley expressways were less controversial and allowed to proceed, while others were put off for further study, as they would cut through developed areas and were considered lower priority. The Spadina Expressway was first conceptualized in December 1953 and became part of the Metro official transportation plan in 1959. The original plan intended to connect a "Highway 403 bypass" in the vicinity of today's Highway 407 in the city of Vaughan south through the borough of North York, just east of Downsview Airport, then south between Dufferin Street and Bathurst Street to Eglinton. The highway would have entered Castle Frank Brook south to St. Clair Avenue through the borough of York. It would then enter Toronto proper south through the Annex neighbourhood, connecting to the east–west Crosstown Expressway north of Dupont Street before ending at the intersection of Bloor Street and Spadina Avenue.

=== 1961–1962: Proposals and approval ===
The plan proposed the most-complex highway interchange attempted in Ontario to that point, covering 40 hectares (99 acres).

The Spadina was considered critical for the development of the planned CA$42 million ($421 million in 2025 dollars) Yorkdale Shopping Centre, southwest of the Highway 401 interchange, and the developers of the mall threatened to cancel its construction if the highway was not approved. Only after Metro Council formally approved the expressway project in 1962 did the land owners, T. Eaton Co. Limited, commit to its construction. The estimated cost of the expressway in 1961 was CA$65 million ($680 million in 2025 dollars), By 1969, the cost had risen to $136.2 million ($1.14 billion in 2025 dollars). On December 12, 1961, Metro Council approved the Spadina Expressway project in a 13 to 8 vote, committing $5 million to the project. This covered the cost of the first section from Lawrence Avenue to Highway 401. However, council also deferred approving the whole route.

Opposition to the project was already mounting by this point. In 1960, members of the Cedarvale Ratepayers Association disrupted meetings of the Metro Toronto Roads Committee discussing the project. York Township, which became the Borough of York, opposed the construction of the highway, particularly through the Cedarvale Ravine, characterized as "the only park area west of Bathurst Street and north of St. Clair Avenue available to serve 100,000 citizens". Members of the association proposed studying the need for the expressway as well as studying an alternate route along Dufferin Street. The Roads Committee turned down their requests, and York Township threatened to go to the Supreme Court of Canada to block Metro from taking their park. Metro chairman Fred Gardiner opined, "I can't see how anyone would allow one of 13 municipalities to block an expressway."

In 1961, the Metro Roads Committee held meetings to hear submissions on the routing of the expressway. Forest Hill Village objected to the proposed route of the expressway though the village. The road and the interchange at Eglinton Avenue would require the demolition of 276 buildings and bisect the village. Forest Hill proposed a tunnel from the Cedarvale Ravine north, under Forest Hill. Gardiner, former reeve of Forest Hill, admitted that the project would be harmful to the village, "but there is urgent need for an expressway to serve the northwest Metro area" and that the route through the village was the only one that would allow the expressway to enter the Cedarvale Ravine. In June 1961, the section of the Spadina Expressway south of the Crosstown Expressway was cancelled. The Spadina would now terminate at an interchange with the Crosstown, and Spadina Road north of Bloor Street would be widened.

Ratepayers Associations banded together to object to the municipal expressway plan, forming the "Coordinating Committee of Toronto Ratepayers Associations" and the "Metro Ratepayers Transportation Committee". University of Toronto professor James Acland of the Rathnelly Residents Association spoke of the futility of combining rapid transit and expressways on one route. "They won't persuade anyone to park his car and take rapid transit when there is a wonderful expressway inviting him to drive downtown." S. A. Hudson, president of the Lawrence Heights Ratepayer Association, cited figures showing the roadway would carry 10,000 vehicles into the core at rush hour, requiring 69 acres (28 ha) for parking alone. The group placed ads in newspapers prior to the December 12, 1961, vote of Metro Council, urging the rejection of the plan. The pressure was partially effective as council voted 19 to 2 to remove the Crosstown, but approved the first stage of the Spadina by a vote of 13 to 8 while deferring a vote on construction south of Lawrence.

The vote put the whole project in doubt. The province wanted Metro council approval for the whole project before releasing any funds, but the vote covered only the Lawrence to Highway 401 section. Transportation minister William Goodfellow wrote to council to state that since Metro had not voted to approve the entire project, the province would not consider connecting Spadina with Highway 401. The vote to have Metro's Road Committee study the route south of Lawrence led to the Roads Committee to hold public hearings. North York Council voted unanimously to fight for approval of the whole project. The hearings heard from more than 30 ratepayer associations. Strong support was heard from North York associations and opposition was mostly from York, Forest Hill and the City of Toronto associations. Opponents proposed a $10 auto tax and $25 truck tax to pay for the cost of Metro expressways instead of paying the costs from property taxes and wanted Metro to finish the Gardiner and Don Valley expressways first.

On February 19, 1962, Metro Roads Committed approved the whole project by a 5 to 1 vote, the only dissenter being future Toronto Mayor William Dennison. The meeting was picketed by opponents with signs proclaiming "Spadina Expressway No!", "Taxes at Critical Level" and "We are Watching How You Vote". The committee also recommended removing the Crosstown from the plan. Metro Chairman William R. Allen, whom the road would ultimately be named after, spoke in favour of the project based on the rapid transit portion of the project, which included commuter parking lots at northern stations. "If this does not get the motorist out his vehicle and back to rapid transit, Metro Council cannot be blamed."

On March 6, 1962, the full Metro Council voted 14 to 8 to approve the whole project, with the Lawrence to 401 section to start construction in 1964. The approval would allow Metro to purchase lands for the project, but approval to actually construct the highway would not take place until the 1967 budget. By this time, opposition had developed on several points:

- the high cost of the project, and the tax burden
- putting the highway through a section of Cedarvale Park
- building the Spadina will make the Crosstown inevitable, leading to further demolitions in the city
- property owners whose properties would be affected
- the addition of more cars to the downtown

=== 1963–1969: Construction ===
By 1963, costs had risen to over $73 million for the plan. Metro, which was also constructing the Gardiner Expressway, Don Valley Parkway and Bloor–Danforth subway lines had fallen under the scrutiny of the Ontario Municipal Board (OMB) over its spending. The OMB had to approve the 1963 budget before Metro could. The Spadina was separated from the 1963 budget, and the OMB held hearings into the project. In submissions to the OMB, the townships of Forest Hill and York again objected. CCTTRA, and the CCTRA noted its objections. The OMB upheld the Spadina project. The OMB stated in its decision that the "sectional interest must give way to the public need of the larger area." On the issue of the ravine parklands, the OMB stated "The board should and does expect that any park land that may be lost to York Township as a result of this undertaking will be replaced, insofar as may be possible in the circumstances, by suitable alternative lands for that purpose."

Construction started in 1963 with the clearing of the route. The area north of Lawrence Avenue was open land. South of Lawrence, dozens of homes were demolished. Coinciding with the opening of the Yorkdale mall, an interim roadway was opened from Lawrence north to Yorkdale Road on February 25, 1964. Although the Spadina Expressway was a Metro Toronto project, the province constructed 13 structures at the interchange with Highway 401 while the remainder were built by Metro, since Highway 401 was also being widened to a collector-express system at that time. A 1.21-kilometre (0.75 mi) temporary diversion for Highway 401 was constructed to keep traffic flowing while interchange construction progressed.

In 1964, Metro released another transportation plan, which proposed the Spadina route south of Bloor, again requiring the demolition of homes south of Davenport. Toronto City Council adopted an official plan opposing the Crosstown Expressway and the Christie Expressway completely. Ontario's Minister of Municipal Affairs overruled the city, and modified the city's plan to allow for the construction of both expressways. The City and Metro were now in disagreement.

On December 15, 1966, the section from Lawrence Avenue north to Transit Road was opened to traffic. Construction then started on the section south to Eglinton Avenue. York Council had dropped its opposition to the expressway and made an agreement with Metro on the use of Cedarvale Park for the expressway. This agreement provided for the creation of 12 acres (4.9 ha) of park lands in the Borough of York to replace the park lands lost to the expressway trench. This plan would have meant the expropriation of homes for the replacement lands and residents of York protested the plan to the Council. The cost of the expropriation plan was an estimated $4 million of construction, plus the loss of the assessment, while putting a cover over the roadway within the park would have cost $5 million. The opposition led Metro to agree to building the expressway within a tunnel under the park.

As construction proceeded, opposition to the expressway grew among City of Toronto residents. In October 1969, the "Stop Spadina, Save Our City Co-ordinating Committee" (SSSOCCC, or "Stop Spadina") was formed, under the chairmanship of University of Toronto professor Allan Powell. The group was a coalition of students, academics, politicians, ratepayer groups and business people. Notable among the opposition was urban theorist Jane Jacobs, who moved to the Annex in 1969, fresh from a battle to stop the Lower Manhattan Expressway in New York City. Marshall McLuhan, too, was opposed to the expressway and said: "Toronto will commit suicide if it plunges the Spadina Expressway into its heart... our planners are 19th century men with a naive faith in an obsolete technology. In an age of software Metro planners treat people like hardware — they haven't the faintest interest in the values of neighbourhoods or community. Their failure to learn from the mistakes of American cities will be ours too." In the 1969 civic election, three councilors were elected in Toronto on a platform of immediately ending Spadina construction: Ying Hope, William Kilbourn and John Sewell.

=== 1969–1971: Review and cancellation ===
By 1969, all but $10 million of the approved $76 million was spent, completing the roadway only to Lawrence Avenue, and the road bed to Eglinton Avenue. Metro learned that the project would require a further $80 million for completion and halted construction and decided to review the project. The total cost of the project (including the rapid transit line) was now $237 million. A trench had been dug in Cedarvale Park, and Metro Roads and Traffic Commissioner Sam Cass attempted to commit Metro to construction south of Eglinton by arranging to call for tenders in building a tunnel in the park. The call, going against Metro Council's explicit instructions, was noticed only one day before they would be published. The call was cancelled by Metro Chairman Albert Campbell.

Stop Spadina developed its public campaign, producing a short film by McLuhan entitled "The Burning Would" explaining the reasons to stop the project while poking fun at expressway backers. The group also held public lectures with Jacobs and started a petition campaign. Members David and Nadine Nowlan, professors at University of Toronto, released their book The Bad Trip, an economic analysis of the project and explanation of their opposition.

Metro Council voted to apply to the OMB for permission to borrow the funds and requested that the OMB held hearings. OMB Hearings began on January 4, 1971. Opposition groups banded together under the banner of "the Spadina Review Corporation" and hired one of Canada's top trial lawyers, John Josiah "J. J." Robinette, to plead their case. Metro presented its case based on technical studies showing the road was needed to manage expected traffic. Council was represented by its solicitor and its witnesses included Metro and City commissioners and American transportation planner Alan Voorhees. Opposition groups based their case on the factors of noise, pollution, destruction of homes and the expected increase of traffic the roadway would cause. Their witnesses included Jack Fensterstock of the New York City Department of Air Resources, neighbourhood residents, as well as urban planners, economists and architects. No elected officials, nor the Metro chairman, appeared to defend or oppose the project. The Board held 16 days of hearings and gave its approval by a vote of 2–1, OMB chairman J. A. Kennedy dissenting, on February 17, 1971.

The Globe and Mail announces the cancellation of the Spadina Expressway, effectively the end of expressway construction in Toronto.

The Corporation then proceeded to appeal directly to the provincial government cabinet. On June 3, 1971, the provincial government of Bill Davis withdrew its support, effectively killing the project. The province would support the new Spadina subway line extension only. Speaking in the Ontario Legislature, Davis said:

If we are building a transportation system to serve the automobile, the Spadina Expressway would be a good place to start. But if we are building a transportation system to serve people, the Spadina Expressway is a good place to stop.

Toronto Mayor Dennison was shocked at the result. "It's shocking that a group who never at any time suggested workable alternative routes has successfully opposed something as important in the growth of Metro as was the Don Valley". Metro Toronto chairman Albert Campbell was incensed at the provincial government, stating, "It may mean that we will never build another expressway."

==== Ramifications ====
The debate over the Spadina Expressway, and its eventual cancellation, is regarded as a watershed moment in local politics. Toronto City Council was changing at the time to oppose the "top-down" planning of the Metro government. A "Reform Era" in Toronto politics was beginning, which brought to Toronto City Hall David Crombie, John Sewell, Allan Sparrow and Colin Vaughan. This new council viewed the Metro government and its officials with suspicion as not being accountable to local residents. In the 1950s and 1960s, Metro and City councils had pushed through numerous large projects in transportation, and housing. The impacts on the central neighbourhoods had been substantial and had led to grassroots organizing. Councillors Sewell and Vaughan came directly from the grassroots campaigns.

According to Albert Rose in his study of Metro from 1953 to 1971, the cancellation of the project raised four issues that would affect Metro Council afterwards:

- Who plans? – Until this point, planning had been done by professional planners or Metro department heads based on technical issues, such as projected traffic congestion. Metro had not provided a policy for the planners to follow.
- Role of the OMB in policy – The OMB was in charge of approving capital borrowing, a consideration dating from the days of the Depression. In the case of the Spadina, it had had to decide on an issue far beyond approving whether a municipality could afford the project.
- Role of the OMB in planning – The OMB became an approver of land development disputes, which often pitted municipalities or residents or developers against each other. Was this an appropriate role for the OMB?
- Role of the Metro chairman – The Metro chairman did not appear at the OMB to defend the project. Chairman Campbell took a neutral position on a very important project.

Premier Davis called a provincial election not long after the decision, in October 1971. Davis' campaign strategy used the Spadina decision to differentiate his government from past Progressive Conservative governments. Davis, who was both attacked and lauded for the Spadina cancellation, was re-elected with increased support in Toronto. Davis would remain in power in Ontario until 1985, when he retired from politics.

In the opinion of critics, the move set "in motion a trend that has yet to abate: politicians overruling the painstaking work of urban and transportation planners". There is often a long line of vehicles in the southbound lanes from as far north as Lawrence Avenue queued to exit on Eglinton and often long lineups of cars on Eglinton trying to get on Allen Road. The Spadina subway line, designed by the transportation planners within the median of the expressway, has been criticized as the "worst place to put that route ... The stations that serve the Allen Road corridor are among the most uninviting, unwalkable places in the city."

=== 1971–present ===
At the time of cancellation in 1971, the expressway was paved to Lawrence Avenue, while the portion running further south to Eglinton Avenue had been graded only and was given the nickname the "Davis ditch". Traffic from and to the southerly end of the road at Lawrence spilled onto neighbourhood streets, as the activists predicted, especially onto Marlee Avenue. Esther Shiner, who lived near the Lawrence intersection, was elected to North York Council in 1973 on a platform to get the expressway completed to Eglinton Avenue. She headed the "Go Spadina" public campaign that was successful in persuading Metro, against the wishes of the City of Toronto, to pave the ditch and open the road to Eglinton on September 8, 1976.

In response, Davis made plans to transfer a strip of land south of Eglinton to the City of Toronto to block any further extension. Metro and the province ended their dispute in an agreement to build the Black Creek Drive arterial road, a southerly extension of Highway 400. Metro would transfer its Spadina lands south of Eglinton to the province, and the province would build Black Creek Drive south to Weston Road. Metro officials dragged their feet by attempting to get the buffer strip moved to Bathurst and St. Clair, enabling a possible future extension to Bathurst, and a widened Bathurst street, but the province threatened to simply expropriate the lands and the lands were turned over to the province in 1984.

On February 7, 1985, on his final day in office, Davis delivered to the City of Toronto a 1-metre (3.3 ft) wide strip of the land on the south side of Eglinton Avenue West at the Allen intersection, with a 99-year lease, blocking any possible extension to the south. Opponents such as Shiner had wanted the province to hold onto the land, hoping that a future premier would be willing to consider the highway. Shiner felt that "the expressway will be built, bit by bit, into the city". Shiner had received a $20 million estimate from Metro officials to extend Spadina as a four-lane south to Davenport.

After the land transfer, North York Council made several attempts to get Premier David Peterson to reconsider Davis's actions, but he refused to meet Council representatives over the issue. Shiner attempted to get a Metro-wide plebiscite but failed. North York sponsored a telephone survey of Toronto residents to show support for extending the expressway, but a majority supported transit improvements instead. Shiner's attempts ended only when she died of cancer in 1987. Metro chairman Dennis Flynn and Metro planners still pushed for the completion as late as 1988, with the release of a traffic study of northwestern Metro that recommended extending the Spadina south, but Metro Council defeated further studies in a 14–12 vote on July 5, 1988. Another proponent, long-time Metro Commissioner of Roads and Traffic Sam Cass, retired that year.

The Spadina subway line was built in the median of the project right-of-way from Wilson to Eglinton. The route south of Eglinton follows the approximate route planned for later sections of the expressway, albeit underground. Construction of the subway had yet to begin when the expressway was cancelled in 1971. Route studies occurred again, the original route was confirmed once more, and the province approved it in January 1973 and construction began; it opened to Wilson station on January 27, 1978.

In 1996, Metro Council voted to end the matter finally and sell the 112 expropriated properties south of Eglinton Avenue. The properties were appraised and sold at fair market value, offered first to their former owners. The proceeds were divided between Metro and Ontario, with Metro keeping two-thirds up to $30 million, and proceeds above $30 million split equally. One home purchased by Metro in 1967 for $50,000 had appreciated in value to $440,000 by 1997.

During the 2010 Toronto mayoral election, Rocco Rossi proposed completing the expressway in a tunnel to meet the Gardiner Expressway. Later that week, after much criticism of Rossi by other candidates and the media, Rossi revised his position to one of "studying" building a tunnel.

=== Chronology ===
The road opened in three phases:

- Lawrence Avenue to Yorkdale Mall – Four lanes (future southbound lanes) opened to serve Yorkdale Mall on February 25, 1964.
- Lawrence Avenue West to Wilson Heights Boulevard – December 15, 1966
- Lawrence Avenue West to Eglinton Avenue West – September 8, 1976
- Wilson Heights Boulevard to Kennard – June 1982

== Future ==
In September 2014, the City of Toronto completed a study of Allen Road and its operation, its effect on nearby neighbourhoods, and the changes made to it since it opened. The city released six options for the terms of reference for an environmental assessment. The options were as follows:

1. Maintain the roadway as is.
2. Maintain the roadway, make conditions for pedestrians easier, and enhance access to subway stations.
3. Make significant improvements to the corridor through the addition of HOV lanes, bike paths and pedestrian infrastructure.
4. Transform the roadway to a surface roadway.
5. Transform the roadway to a tunnel or deck.
6. Eliminate the roadway entirely and open up the space for other uses. Subway service would remain in place.

== Exit list ==
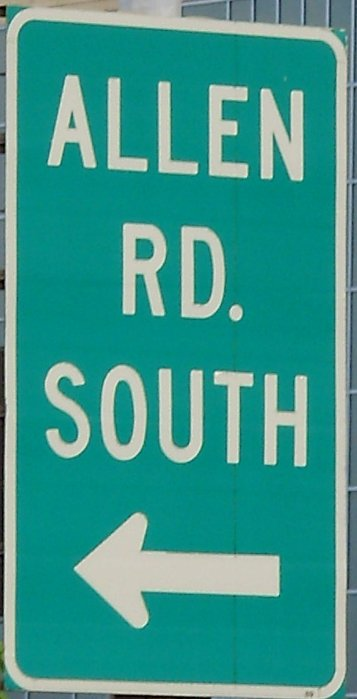
A trailblazer to Allen Road.

The following table lists the interchanges along Allen Road. Unlike the Don Valley Parkway and Gardiner Expressway, exits along Allen Road are not numbered and are identified by street name. The entire route is located within Toronto. Wilson Heights is the last northbound interchange with all other junctions being intersections with traffic signals.

| Location | km | mi | Destinations | Notes |
|---|---|---|---|---|
| Cedarvale | 0.0 | 0.0 | Eglinton Avenue West | Northbound entrance and southbound exit. |
| Lawrence Heights | 2.0 | 1.2 | Lawrence Avenue West | Northbound single-lane on-ramp and southbound two-lane exit ramp; signalized intersections along Lawrence; no right turn on red light; no direct access to Lawrence Allen Centre |
| Yorkdale Shopping Centre | 3.1 | 1.9 | Yorkdale Road | Ramps also connect Yorkdale Road to Highway 401 |
| Yorkdale Shopping Centre | 3.6 | 2.2 | Highway 401 | Combination interchange |
| Wilson Heights | 4.8 | 3.0 | Wilson Heights Boulevard | Northbound exit to Wilson Heights Boulevard and southbound entrance to Allen Road; no access from northbound Wilson Heights Boulevard to northbound Allen Road |
| Wilson Heights | 5.0 | 3.1 | Transit Road | At-grade intersection featuring ramp from northbound Transit Road to southbound Allen Road |
| Wilson Heights | 5.7 | 3.5 | Sheppard West subway station | At-grade intersection |
| Wilson Heights | 6.0 | 3.7 | Sheppard West subway station (bus-only entrance) | At-grade intersection |
| Wilson Heights | 6.3 | 3.9 | Sheppard Avenue West | At-grade intersection |
| Wilson Heights | 6.5 | 4.0 | De Boers Drive | At-grade intersection |
| Wilson Heights | 7.1 | 4.4 | Rimrock Road | At-grade intersection |
| Wilson Heights | 7.3 | 4.5 | Kennard Avenue | At-grade intersection |
Allen Road continues north as Dufferin Street
1.000 mi = 1.609 km; 1.000 km = 0.621 mi

== See also ==
- Cancelled expressways in Toronto
- William Allen

== Bibliography ==
- Colton, Timothy J. (1980). Big Daddy. University of Toronto Press. ISBN 0-80202-393-2.
- Nowlan, David; Nowlan, Nadine (1970). The Bad Trip: The Untold Story of the Spadina Expressway. New Press/ House of Anansi. ISBN 0-88770-005-5.
- Osbaldeston, Mark (2008). Unbuilt Toronto: A history of the city that might have been. Dundurn Press. ISBN 978-1-55002-835-5.
- Rose, Albert (1972). Governing Metropolitan Toronto: A Social and Political Analysis 1953–1971. Berkeley and Los Angeles, California: University of California Press. ISBN 0-52002-041-3.
- Sewell, John (1993). The Shape of the City: Toronto struggles with modern planning. University of Toronto Press. ISBN 0-80207-409-X.
- Sewell, John (2009). The Shape of the Suburbs: Understanding Toronto's Sprawl. University of Toronto Press. ISBN 978-0-80209-884-9.
- Shragge, John; Bagnato, Sharon (1984). From Footpaths to Freeways. Toronto: Ontario Ministry of Transportation and Communications, Historical Committee. ISBN 978-0-77439-388-1.
- Evaluation of W. R. Allen Expressway. Toronto Planning Board. 1970.
