= Morningside, Toronto =

Coordinates: 43.787°N 79.206°W

Morningside
- Neighbourhood
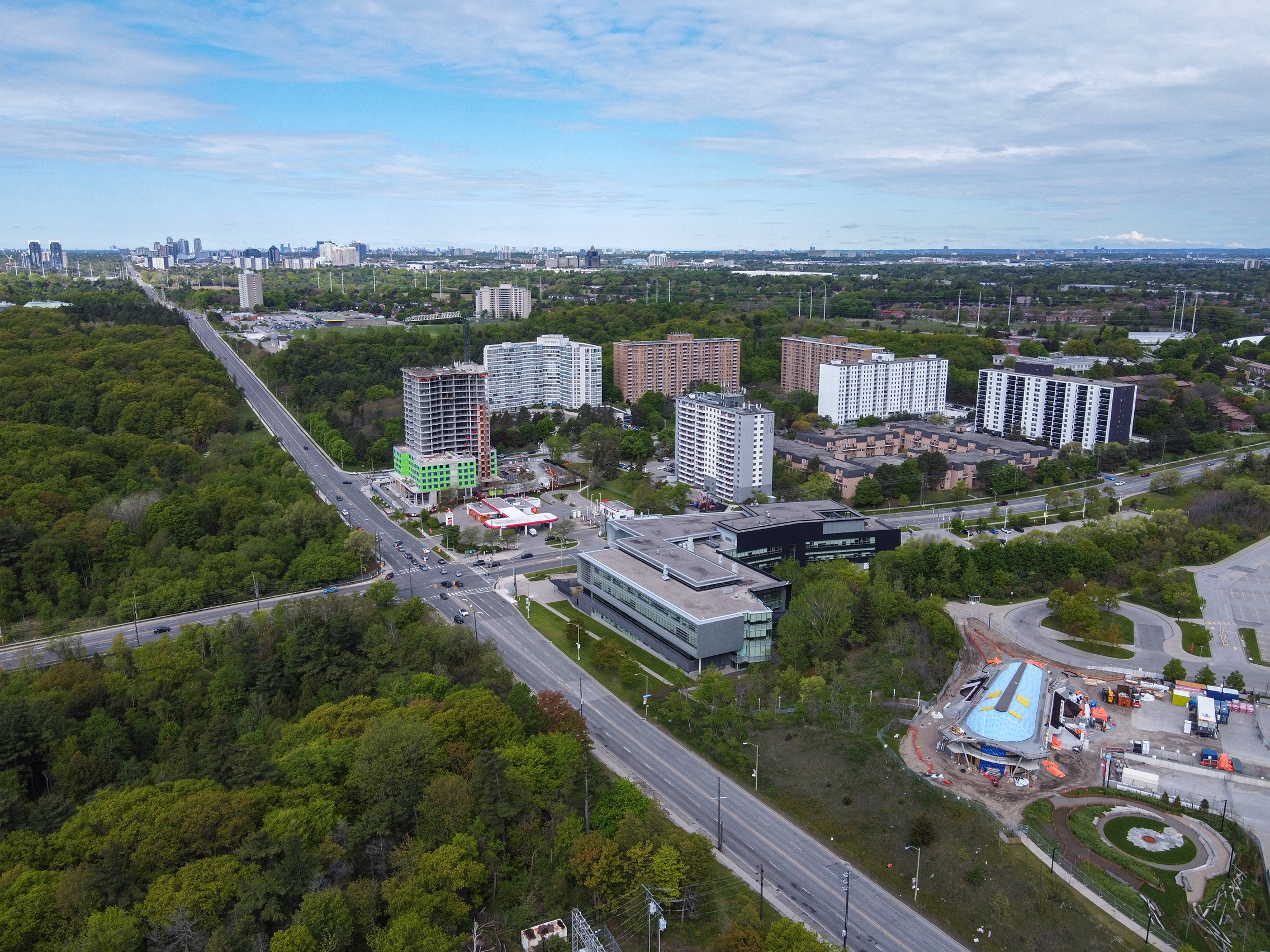
- Aerial view of Morningside near Ellesmere Road (2025)

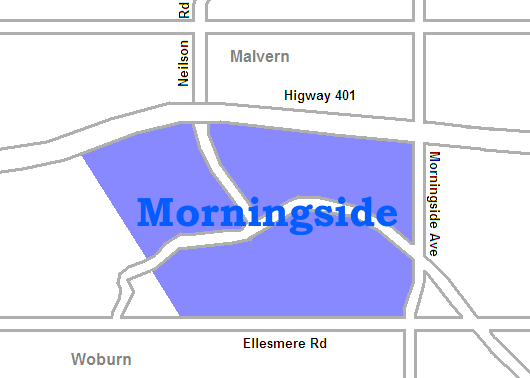
- Country: Canada
- Province: Ontario
- City: Toronto
- Established: 1850 Scarborough Township
- Changed municipality: 1998 Toronto from City of Scarborough

Morningside, also known as Seven Oaks, is a suburban neighbourhood in the city of Toronto, Ontario, Canada. It is located to the north-east of downtown Toronto, in the suburb of Scarborough. Morningside is bordered by Highway 401 to the north, Morningside Avenue to the east, West Highland Creek and Lawrence Avenue to the south and Scarborough Golf Club Road to the west.

== Education ==
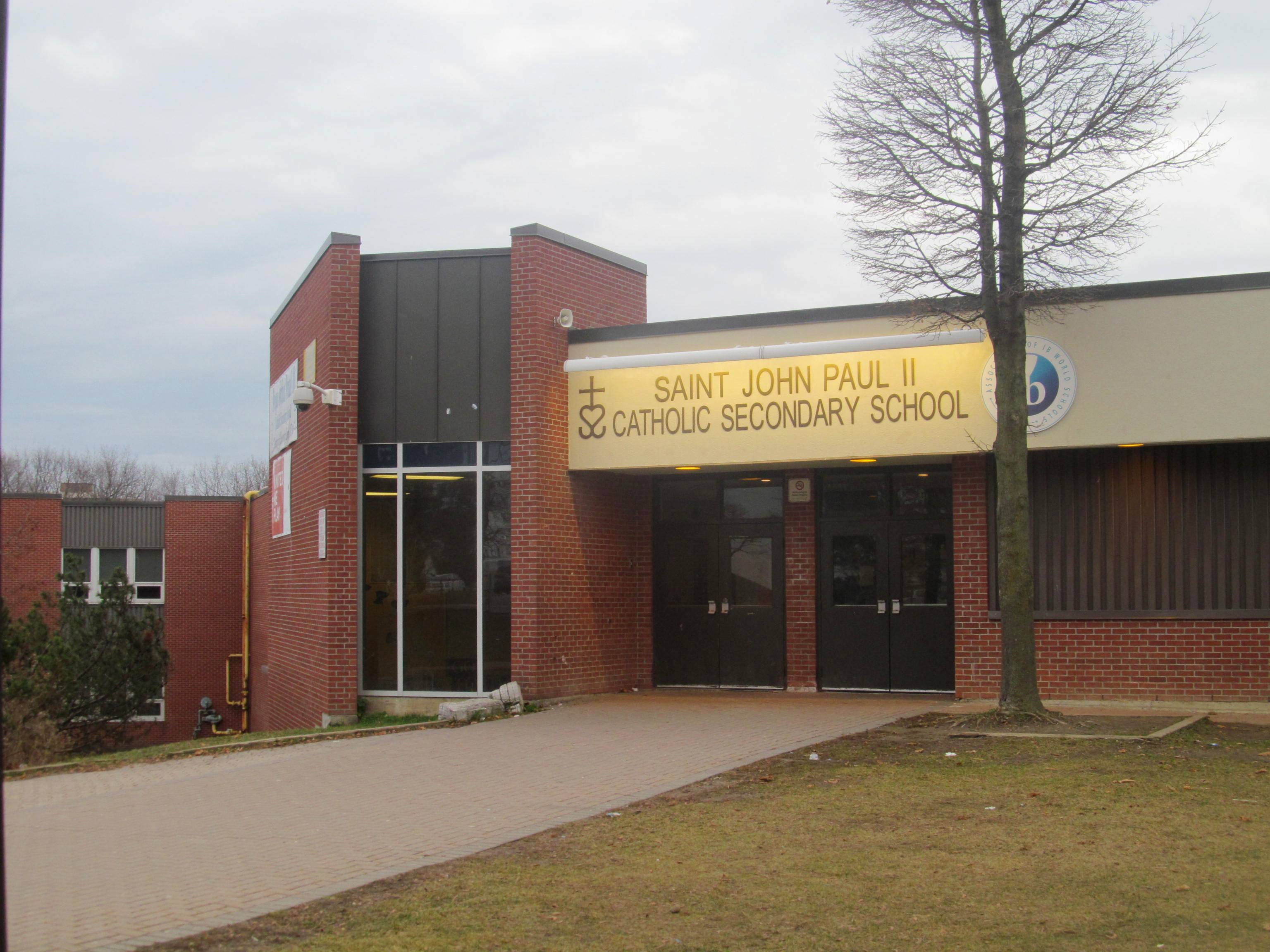
St. John Paul II Catholic Secondary School is a public secondary school located in Morningside.

Two public school boards operate schools in Morningside, the separate Toronto Catholic District School Board (TCDSB), and the secular Toronto District School Board (TDSB).

Both TCDSB, and TDSB operate public elementary schools in the neighbourhood. TCDSB operates St. Edmund Campion Separate School, whereas TDSB operate Military Trail Public School, and Highcastle Public School. TCDSB is the only public school board to operate a secondary school in Morningside, St. John Paul II Catholic Secondary School.

TDSB does not operate a secondary school in the neighbourhood, with TDSB secondary school students residing in Morningside attending institutions in adjacent neighbourhoods. The French first language public secular school board, Conseil scolaire Viamonde, and it separate counterpart, Conseil scolaire catholique MonAvenir also offer schooling to applicable residents of Morningside, although they do not operate a school in the neighbourhood. CSCM and CSV students attend schools situated in other neighbourhoods in Toronto.

== Recreation ==
On 730 Military Trail is Tam Heather Country Club. Tam Heather opened in 1973 as a curling club with eight sheets of ice, then two years later in 1975, the club expanded by adding five tennis courts, three of which were covered in the winter with a bubble. Thirty four years later, in 2009, a four court year-round covered structure was built.

Located along the southern boundary of the neighbourhood is Morningside Park, a municipal park managed by Toronto Parks, Forestry and Recreation Division.
