= Morningside Heights, Toronto =

Morningside Heights
- Neighbourhood
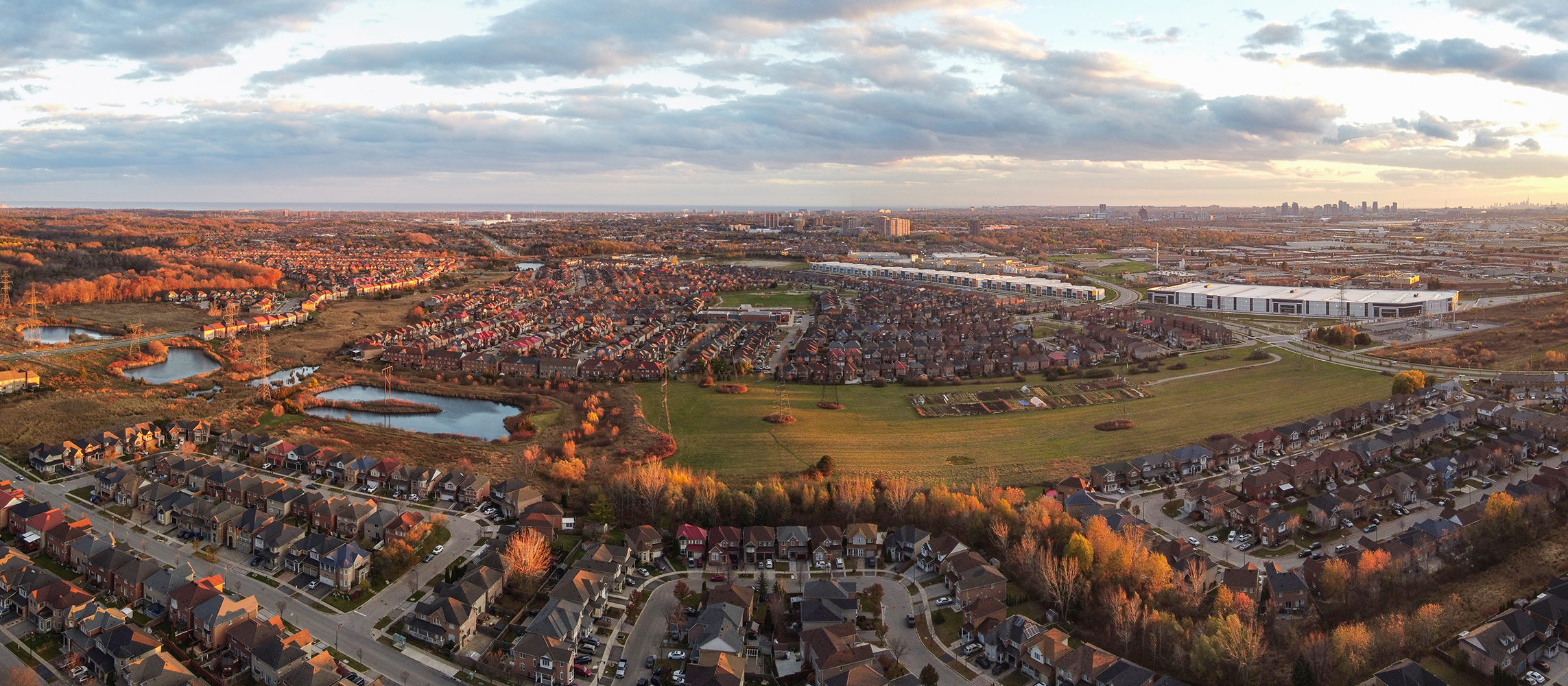
- Aerial view of Morningside Heights, Toronto in 2023

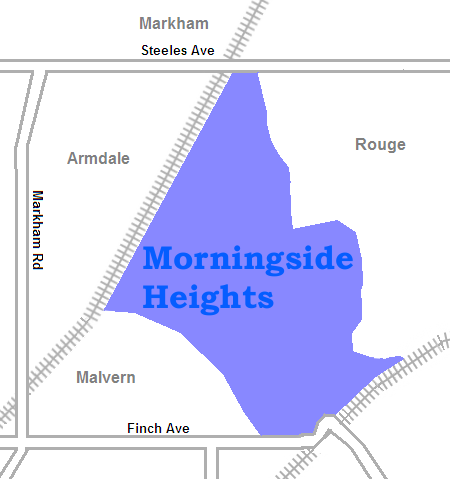
- Coordinates: 43°49′12″N 79°13′06″W
- Country: Canada
- Province: Ontario
- City: Toronto
- Established: 1850 Scarborough Township
- Changed municipality: 1998 Toronto from City of Scarborough
- Developed: 2002 (Subdivision)

Government
  - MP: Shaun Chen (Scarborough North)
  - MPP: Raymond Cho (Scarborough North)
  - Councillor: Jamaal Myers (Scarborough North)
- Website: www.mhna.ca

Morningside Heights is a residential neighbourhood in Toronto, Ontario, Canada. It is located in the northeast corner of the city, in the district of Scarborough, just north of the neighbourhood of Malvern and west of Rouge Park and the Rouge. The subdivision, comprising approximately 750 acres (3.0 km^{2}), was one of the last large tracts of undeveloped land within the City of Toronto, located between Finch Avenue East and Steeles Avenue East, from Tapscott Road to the Rouge River.

The area is named after Morningside Avenue, which was extended north into the neighbourhood. The northern section of Morningside Heights is also known as Brookside. The community is divided, north and south, by hydro lines that cut across the development. The name Brookside originates from a golf course that was once on the site, northeast of the intersection of Oasis Boulevard and Seasons Drive.

Local residents formed the Morningside Heights Neighbourhood Association in 2015. In 2018, it was registered with the Ontario Ministry of Government and Consumer Services as a not-for-profit group.

== History ==
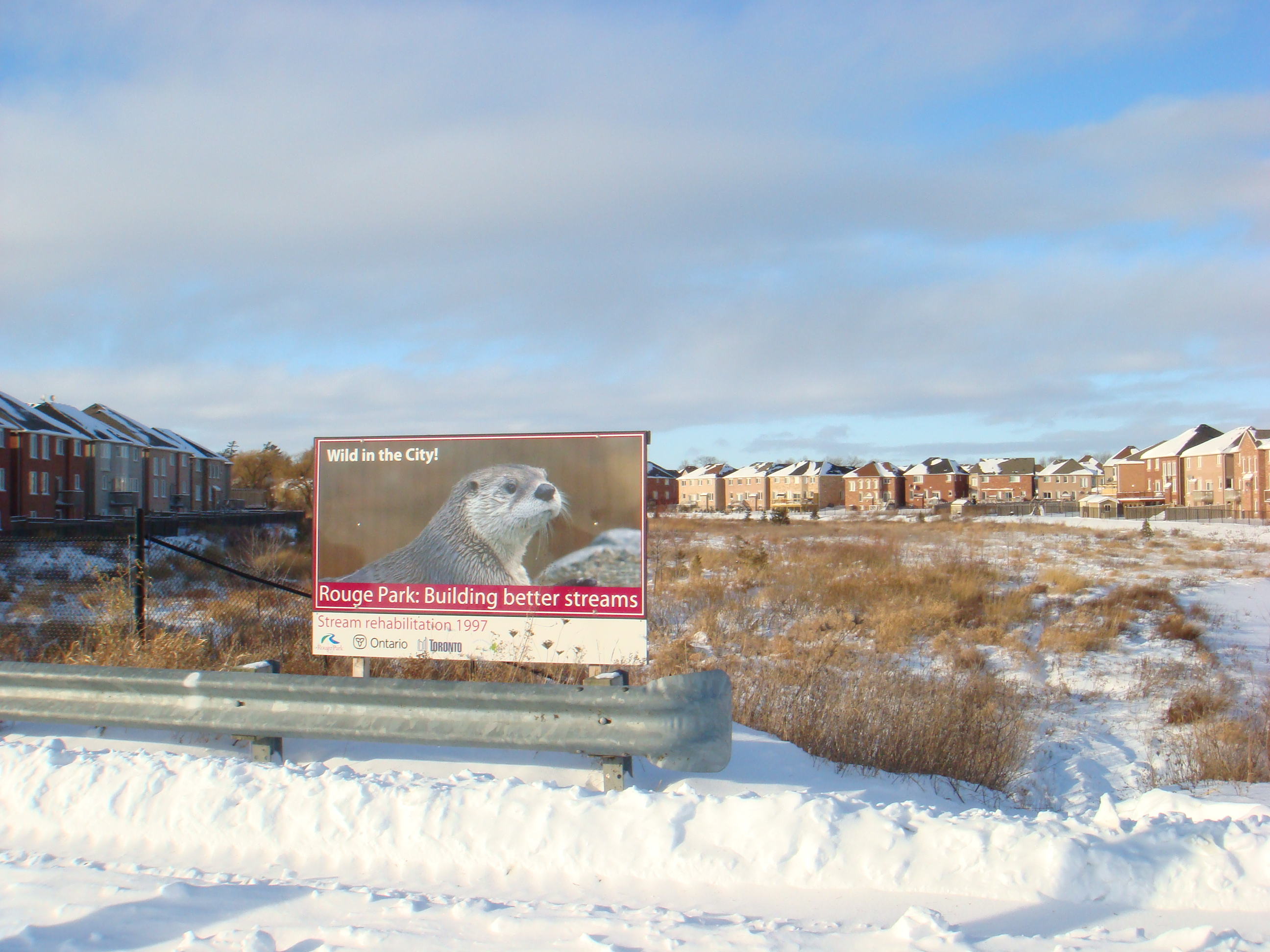
Residential developments took place in the neighbourhood in the early 21st century.

The first phase of Morningside Heights development took place in 2002. The last houses to be constructed were completed in 2015. The area has proved to be very diverse, with a large number of South Asian (predominantly Sri Lankan Tamils, Pakistanis, and Indians), Caribbean and Filipino residents among others.

The neighbourhood is entirely residential with no commercial developments, although it contains unused land intended for future developments. The local homeowners association was successful in stopping the planned proposal for a gas station to be built at the southwest corner of Neilson Road and Morningside Avenue, citing potential health risks.

== Education ==
Two public school boards operate schools in Morningside Heights, the separate Toronto Catholic District School Board (TCDSB), and the secular Toronto District School Board (TDSB).

TDSB operates two public elementary schools (JK-Grade 8) in the neighbourhood, Brookside Public School, and Thomas Wells Public School. Brookside sits on much of the former golf course and is surrounded by single-detached housing. Designed by Teeple Architects, this school was opened in September 2007. Also this school has achieved the LEED Gold" certification. Students attending Brookside requires school uniform. Thomas Wells Public School, named after Thomas Leonard Wells, was opened in September 2005. This school was the first LEED Silver certified elementary school in Canada. Currently the school has over 700 students. this was derived from the street that The school is located on Nightstar Road.

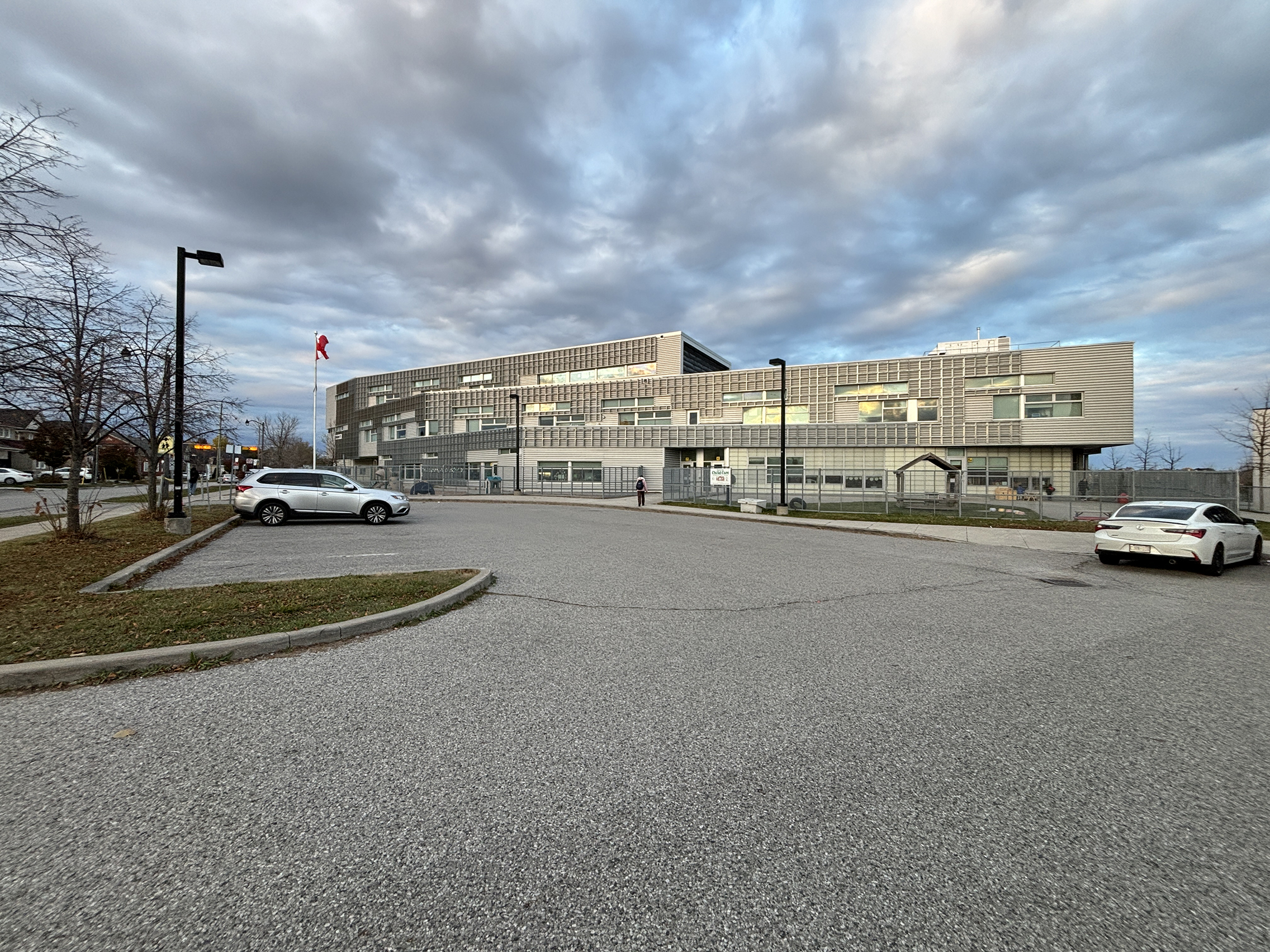
Brookside Public School is one of three public elementary schools situated in Morningside Heights.

TCDSB operates one public elementary school in the neighbourhood, St. Pier Giorgio Frassati Catholic School, located adjacent to Brookside Public School. The school opened in September 2013.

Neither school board operates a secondary school in the neighbourhood, with TCDSB/TDSB secondary school students residing in Morningside Heights attending institutions in other neighbourhoods. The French-based public secular school board, Conseil scolaire Viamonde, and it separate counterpart, Conseil scolaire catholique MonAvenir also offer schooling to applicable residents of Morningside, although they do not operate a school in the neighbourhood, with CSCM/CSV students attending schools situated in other neighbourhoods in Toronto.

== Transportation ==
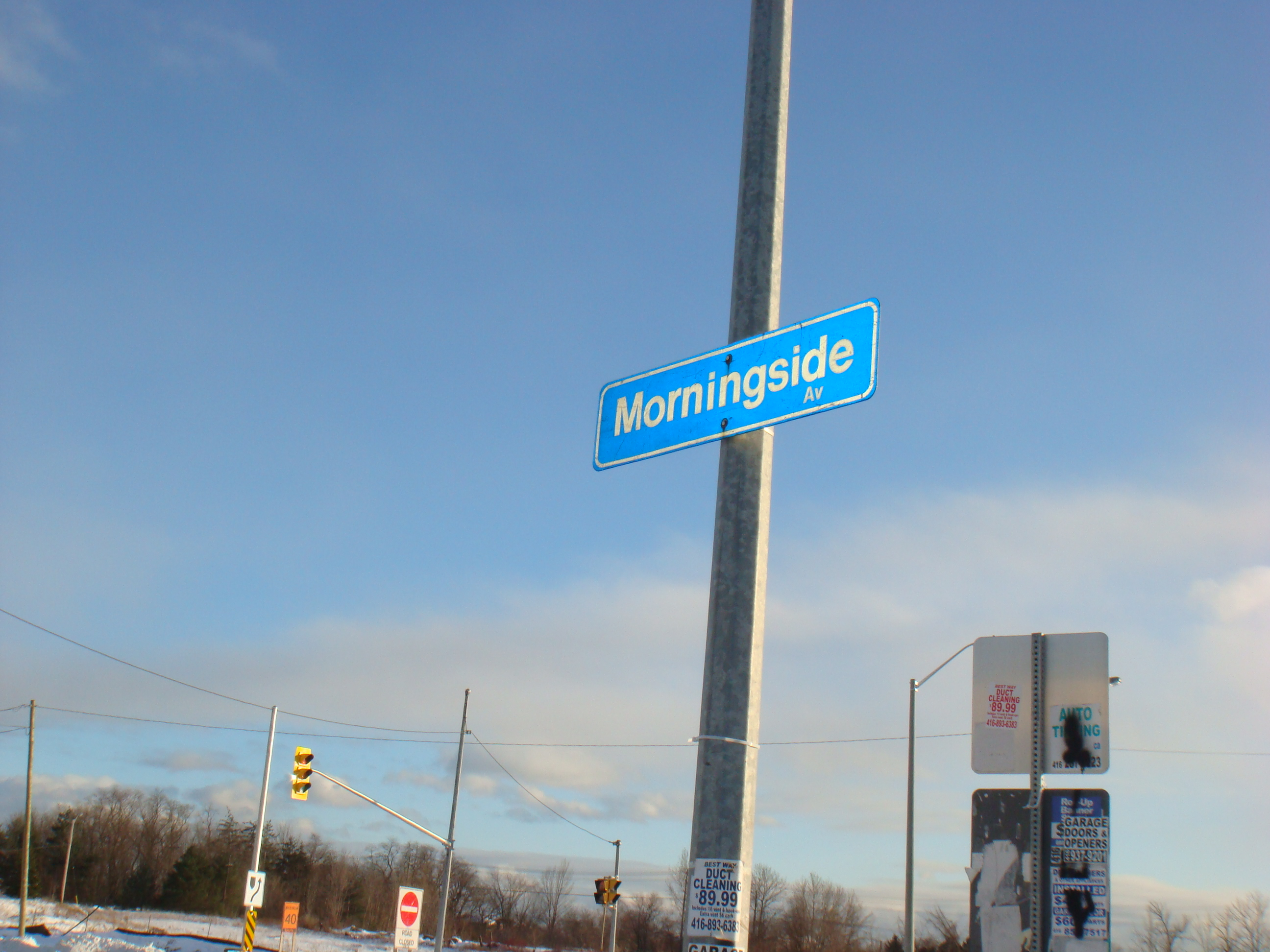
View of Finch and Morningside Avenue, two major roadways in the neighbourhood.

Major east-west roadways located in Morningside Heights includes Finch Avenue, and Steeles Avenue, with the latter road acting as the boundary for the neighbourhood. The northern end of Morningside Avenue is also located at Morningside Heights

=== Public transportation ===
Public transportation is provided by the Toronto Transit Commission's (TTC) bus system. The 133 Neilson links the neighbourhood to Scarborough Centre and Kennedy stations. The 53A Steeles East provides additional service to the northeast section of the area, while travelling as far as Finch station in North York. The 939C Finch Express provides express bus service to Finch station during weekday rush hours.

== Services ==
The area is served by Toronto Fire Services Stations 211 and 212, Toronto Police Service 42 Division and Toronto Paramedic Service Station 25 and 27.
