= Finch station =

Toronto subway station

Finch
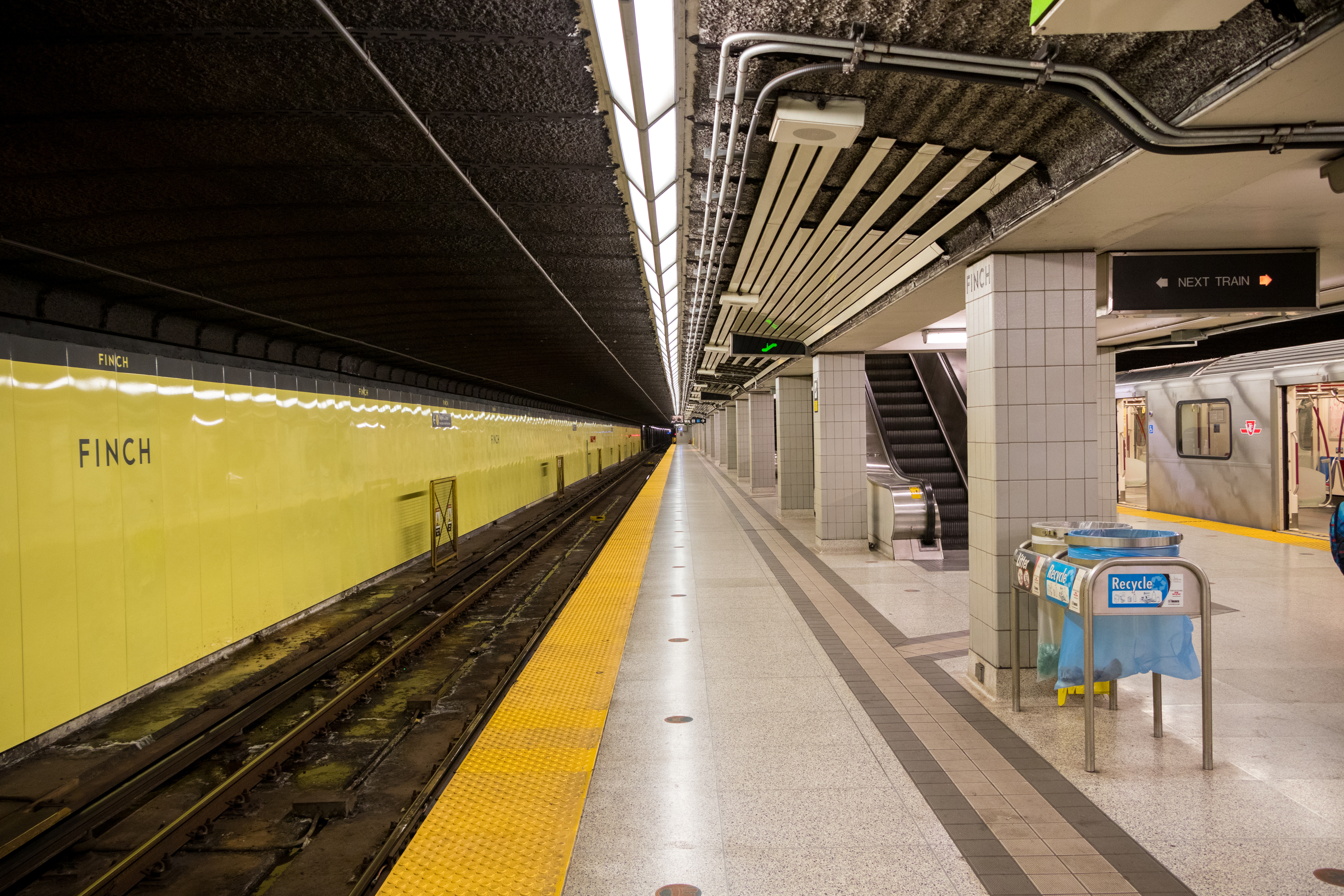
- Platform level

General information
- Location: 5600 Yonge Street; Toronto, Ontario; Canada
- Coordinates: 43°46′53″N 79°24′57″W
- Platforms: Centre platform
- Tracks: 2
- Connections: TTC buses: 36 Finch West; 39 Finch East; 42 Cummer; 53 Steeles East; 60 Steeles West; 97 Yonge; 125 Drewry; 320 Yonge; 336 Finch West; 339 Finch East; 939 Finch Express; 953 Steeles East Express; 960 Steeles West Express; Finch Bus Terminal

Construction
- Structure type: Underground
- Parking: 3,227
- Accessible: Yes

Other information
- Website: Official station page

History
- Opened: March 29, 1974; 52 years ago

Passengers
- 2023–2024: 70,775
- Rank: 6 of 70

Services
Preceding station	Toronto Transit Commission	Following station
North York Centre towards Vaughan	Line 1 Yonge–University	Terminus
Location

Finch is a rapid transit station in Toronto, Ontario, Canada. It is located under Yonge Street, north of Finch Avenue.

It is the northern terminus of the eastern portion of Line 1 Yonge–University. Finch is the busiest TTC bus terminal and the sixth-busiest subway station, serving approximately 70,775 people per day. The station connects with GO Transit and York Regional Transit buses at the adjoining Finch Bus Terminal.

== History ==
The station was opened on March 29, 1974, in what was then the Borough of North York, by provincial premier Bill Davis and borough mayor Mel Lastman. It replaced York Mills as the northern terminus of the line. Houses which once fronted the station along Yonge Street were demolished. Finch was created using the cut-and-cover technique as a way to save money.

In 1999, this station became accessible with elevators.

In April 2006, work began on creating a new exit from the bus station on the western stub of Pemberton Avenue. This new exit was created because of the passenger and vehicular congestion that was created during the rush hour periods. In the morning rush hour, buses took an average of 1 minute and 58 seconds to travel the 40 metres from the station to Yonge Street, with some waiting up to 4 minutes. The new exit was completed in January 2007.

== Station description ==
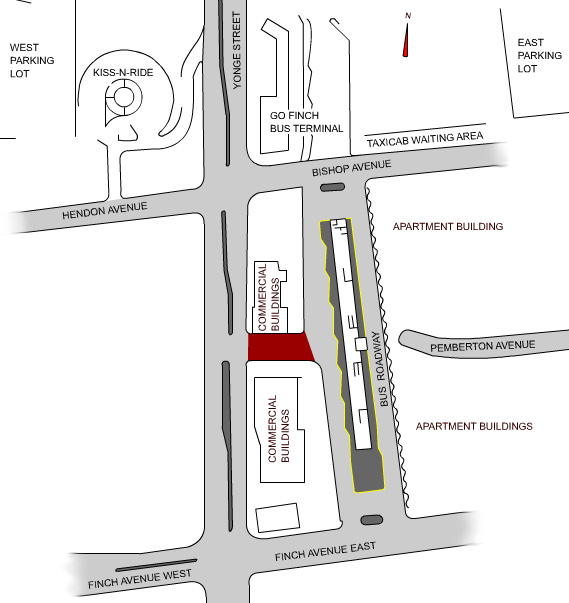
A map of Finch station and surrounding area. The maroon area indicates the Pemberton exit.

=== Station layout and features ===
Stairs, escalators, and elevators lead from the bus platform down three levels to the train platform. The upper concourse, one floor below the bus platform, is a corridor running the length of the bus platform. It collects the landings of all of the terminal's stairs and escalators and leads to another bank of stairs and escalators down to the lower concourse.

The lower concourse level is the main concourse of the subway station. It is divided into the fare-paid and unpaid areas. The unpaid area is a long corridor, part of which runs alongside the fare-paid area lined with several automated Presto card fare gates and staffed entrances. It contains connections to office towers (North American Life, Place Nouveau, and condominiums on Pemberton Avenue), the regional bus terminal, and the "kiss-and-ride" passenger drop-off facility; it also contains Presto card fare vending machines. The fare-paid area houses a few shops, including Gateway Newstands and Tim Hortons, florist, lottery booth, clothing shop, and stairs and escalators down to the subway platform.

=== Entrances ===
Passengers can enter the station from eight different entrances located in the Finch Avenue and Yonge Street area. Accessible entrances can be found on Yonge Street at Hendon Avenue, by the Finch Bus Terminal, and at the North American Centre. Other non-accessible entrances can be found at 5775 and 5765 Yonge Street, Pemberton Avenue, and at the northeast corner of the Yonge Street and Finch Avenue intersection.

There is an emergency exit between Finch and North York Centre stations at the northeast corner of Church Avenue and Yonge Street. The site was once the Willowdale United Church, demolished to make way for subway construction. Stairs from the subway tunnel surface into a brick building in the old cemetery.

=== Parking lots and passenger drop-off facility ===
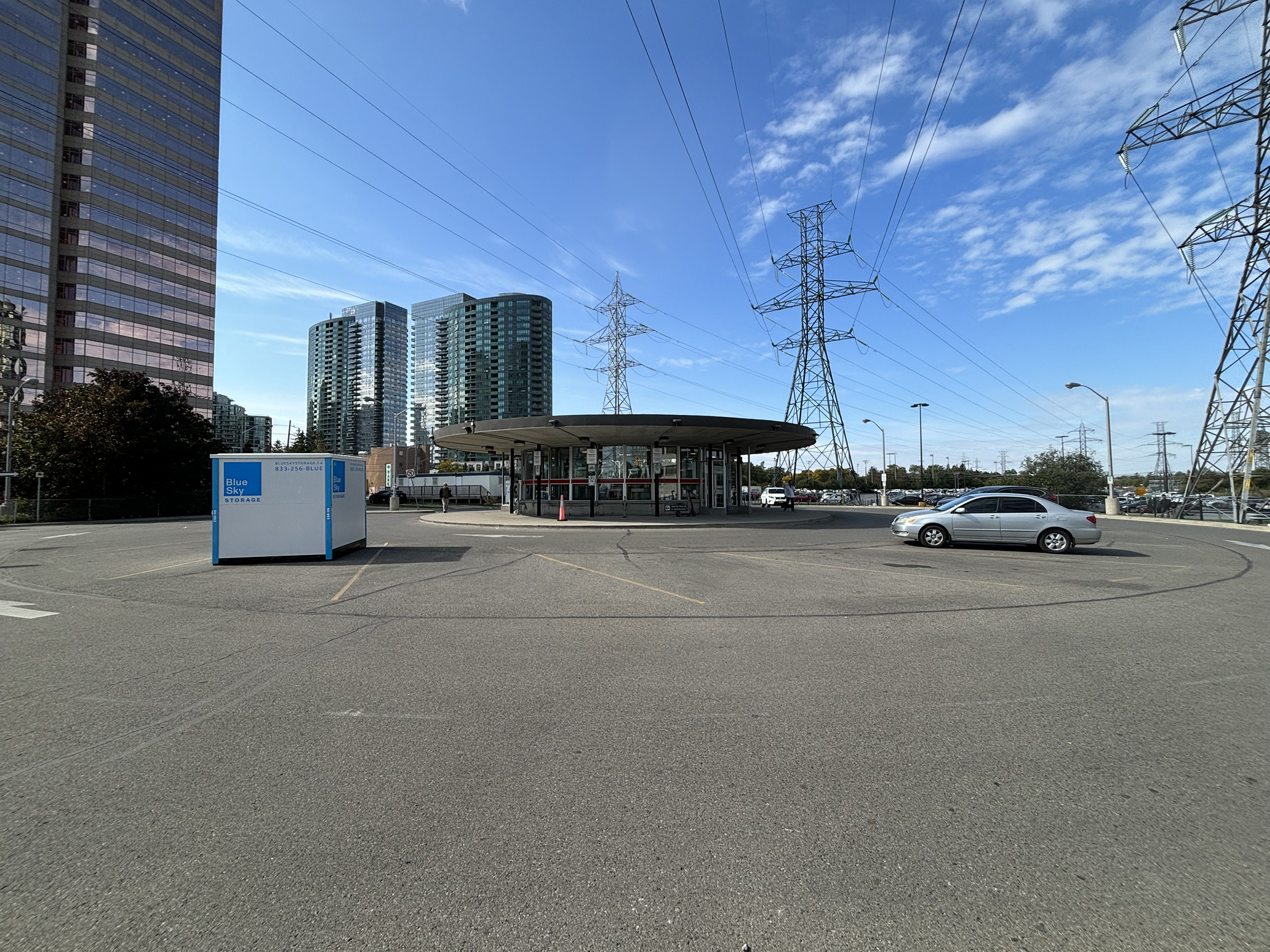
Station "kiss-and-ride" area

There are two major TTC parking lots (referred to as the car park in directional signage) at Finch station for use by commuters. They are named the East Lot and the West Lot, and are located north of Bishop/Hendon, east and west of Yonge Street respectively. The lots have a combined capacity of 3,227 parking spaces, the most of any TTC facility.

In addition to the parking lots, Finch station also features a relatively elaborate "kiss-and-ride" passenger drop-off/pick-up facility, which is connected to the lower concourse level of the station (outside the fare-paid area) by pedestrian tunnels. The area has a round, indoor waiting area for passengers, with about 20 temporary parking spaces circularly surrounding the structure. It is adjacent to the west parking lot.

On the north side of Bishop Avenue, slightly east of the station (along the southern edge of the GO bus terminal) is a parking lane for taxicabs. This is best accessed by exiting the subway station at the stairs/escalator to the north-east corner of Yonge and Bishop (the GO bus terminal).

== Ridership ==
Finch station ridership
Year	Riders	±% p.a.
2007	92,610	—
2008	94,920	+2.49%
2009	94,400	−0.55%
2010	96,240	+1.95%
2011	101,940	+5.92%
2012	97,460	−4.39%
2013	97,460	+0.00%
2014	90,910	−6.72%
2015	100,820	+10.90%
2016	85,720	−14.98%
2018	99,350	+7.66%

The ridership at Finch station has been relatively stable since 2007, with a peak ridership of 101,940 in 2011 and the lowest ridership in 2016 with 85,720 riders.

== Architecture and art ==
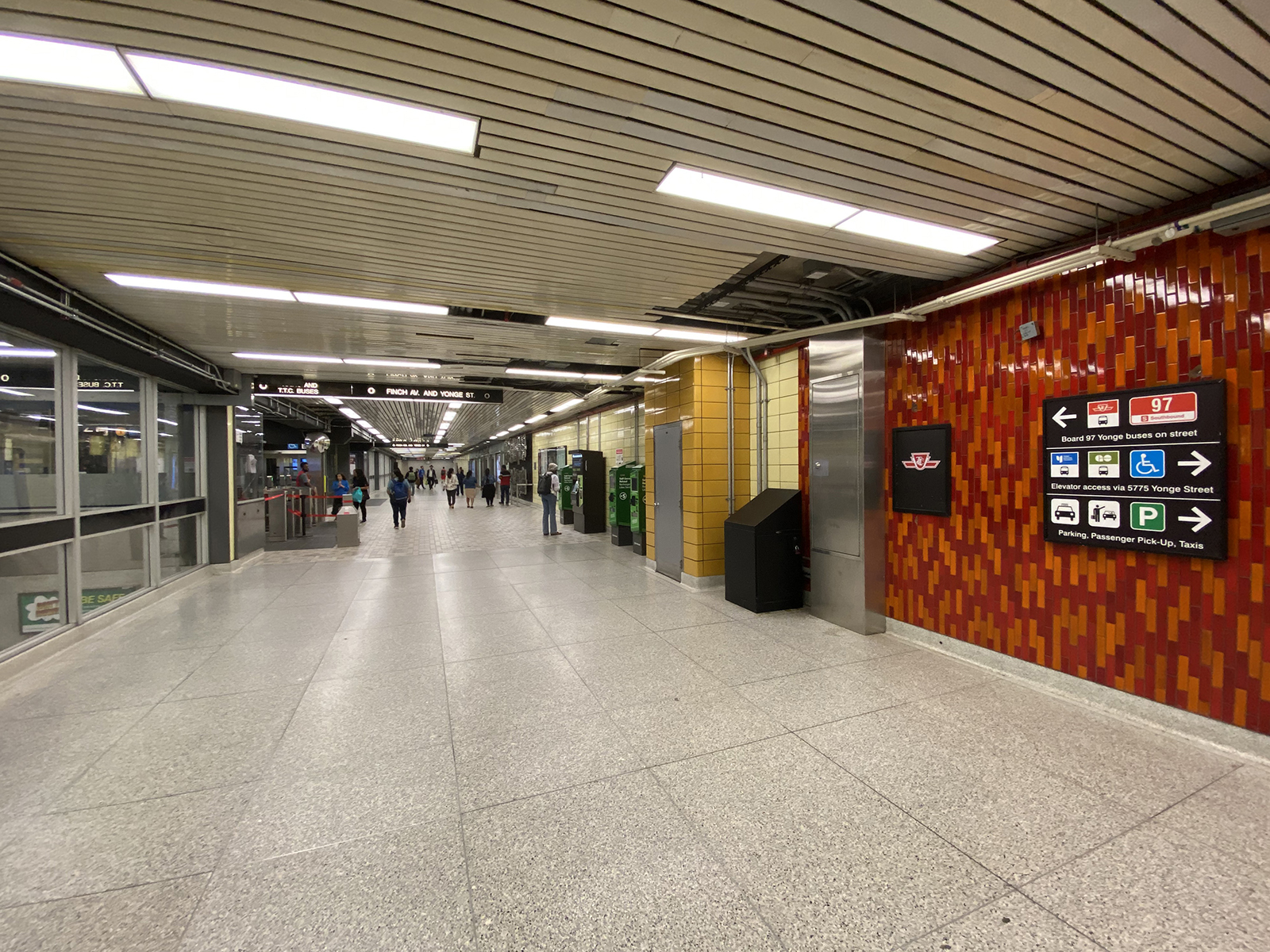
Concourse in 2023

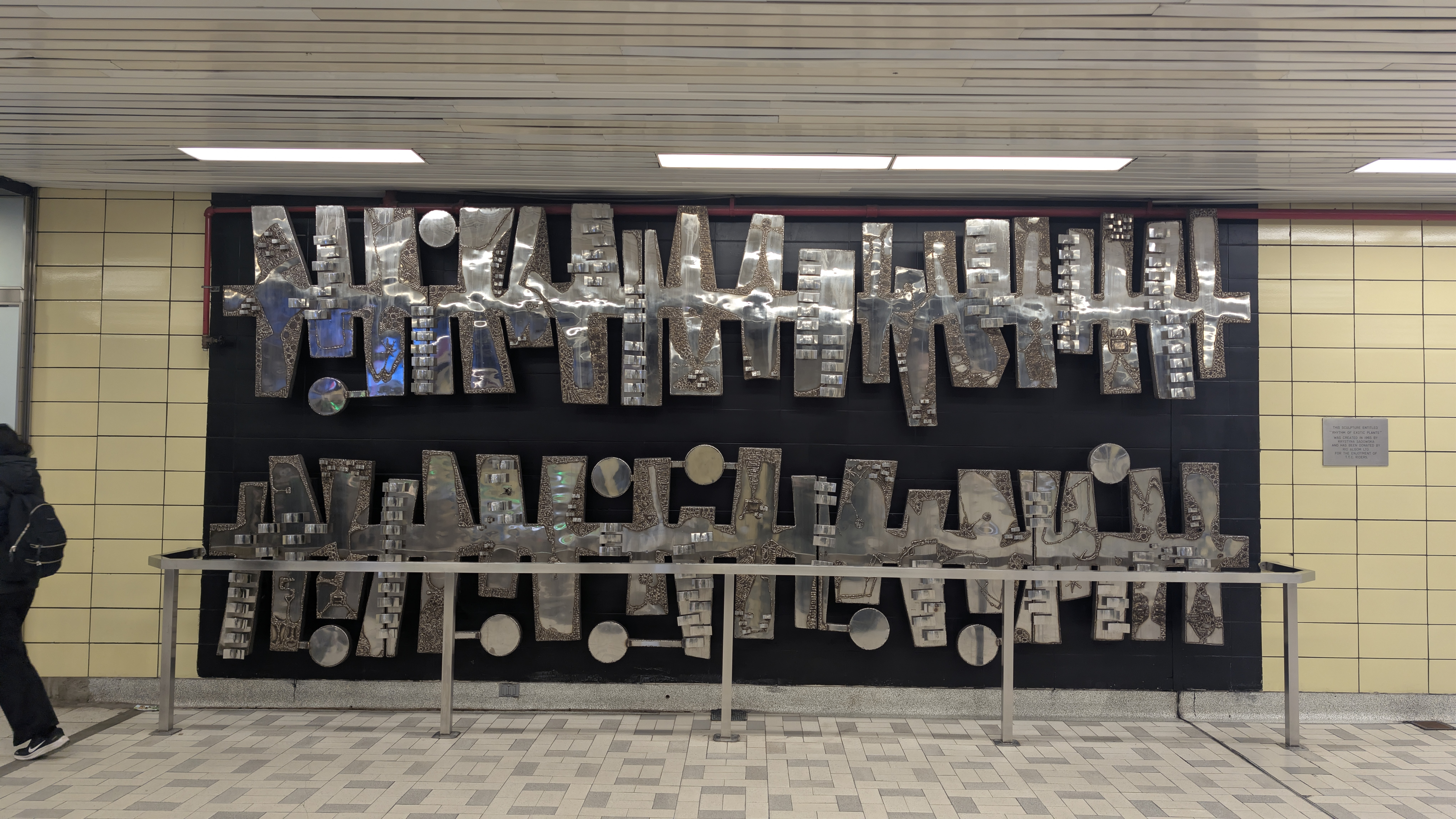
The sculpture on the concourse level, Rhythm Of Exotic Plants, is "donated by Rio Algom Ltd. for the enjoyment of TTC riders".

Krystyna Sadowska's sculpture Rhythm of Exotic Plants (1965) is displayed on the lower concourse level, outside the fare-paid area; A stainless-steel plaque celebrating the station's opening is also located on the lower concourse. A smaller plaque is located at the south subway platform.

== Subway infrastructure in the vicinity ==
North of the station, there are two tail tracks extending beyond the end of the platform, plus a third in between them, to store subway trains. South of the station, there is a diamond crossover for arriving trains to cross over to the southbound track, and for departing trains on the northbound track to depart via the southbound track.

== Surface connections ==
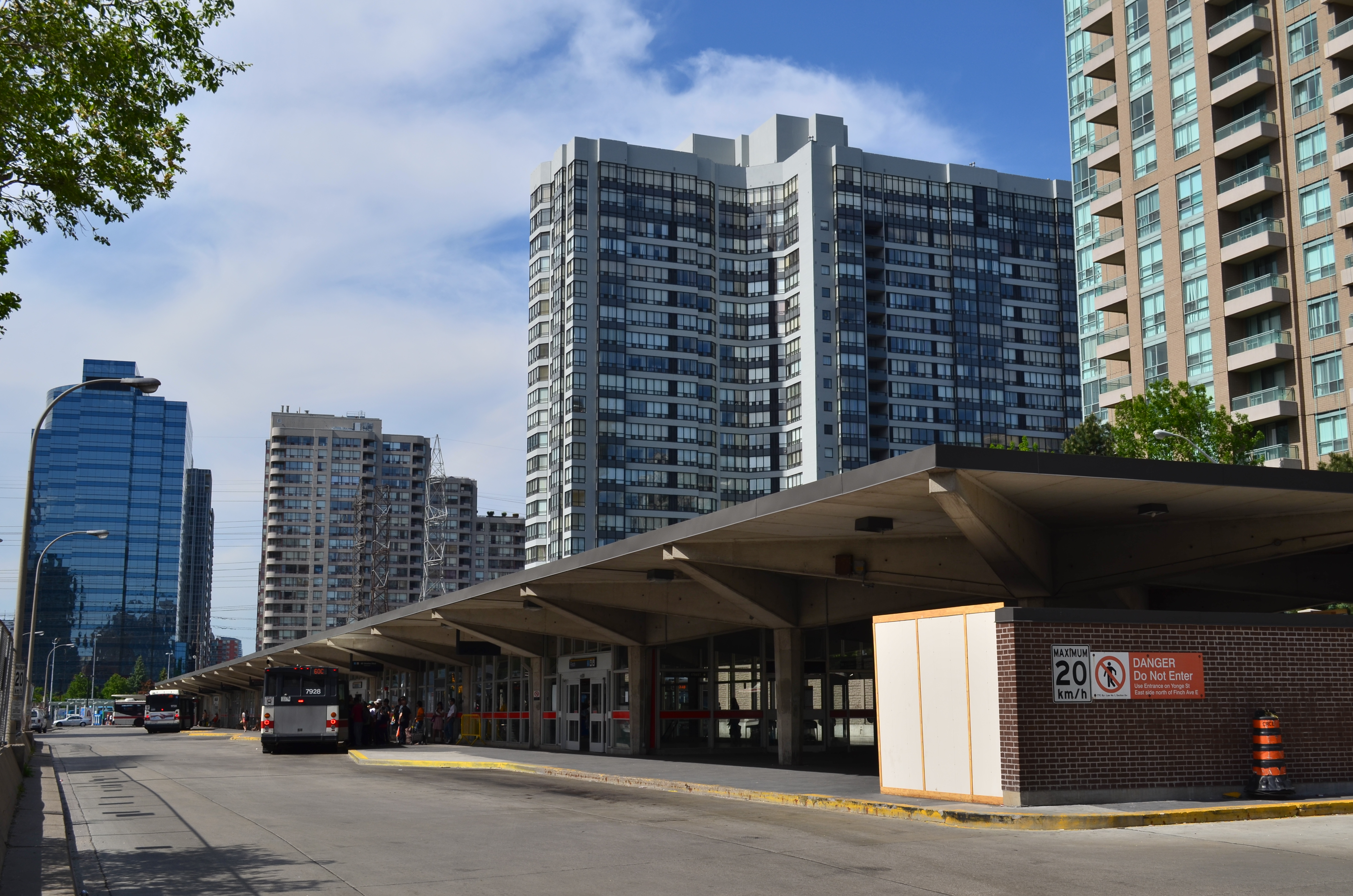
Finch Bus Terminal

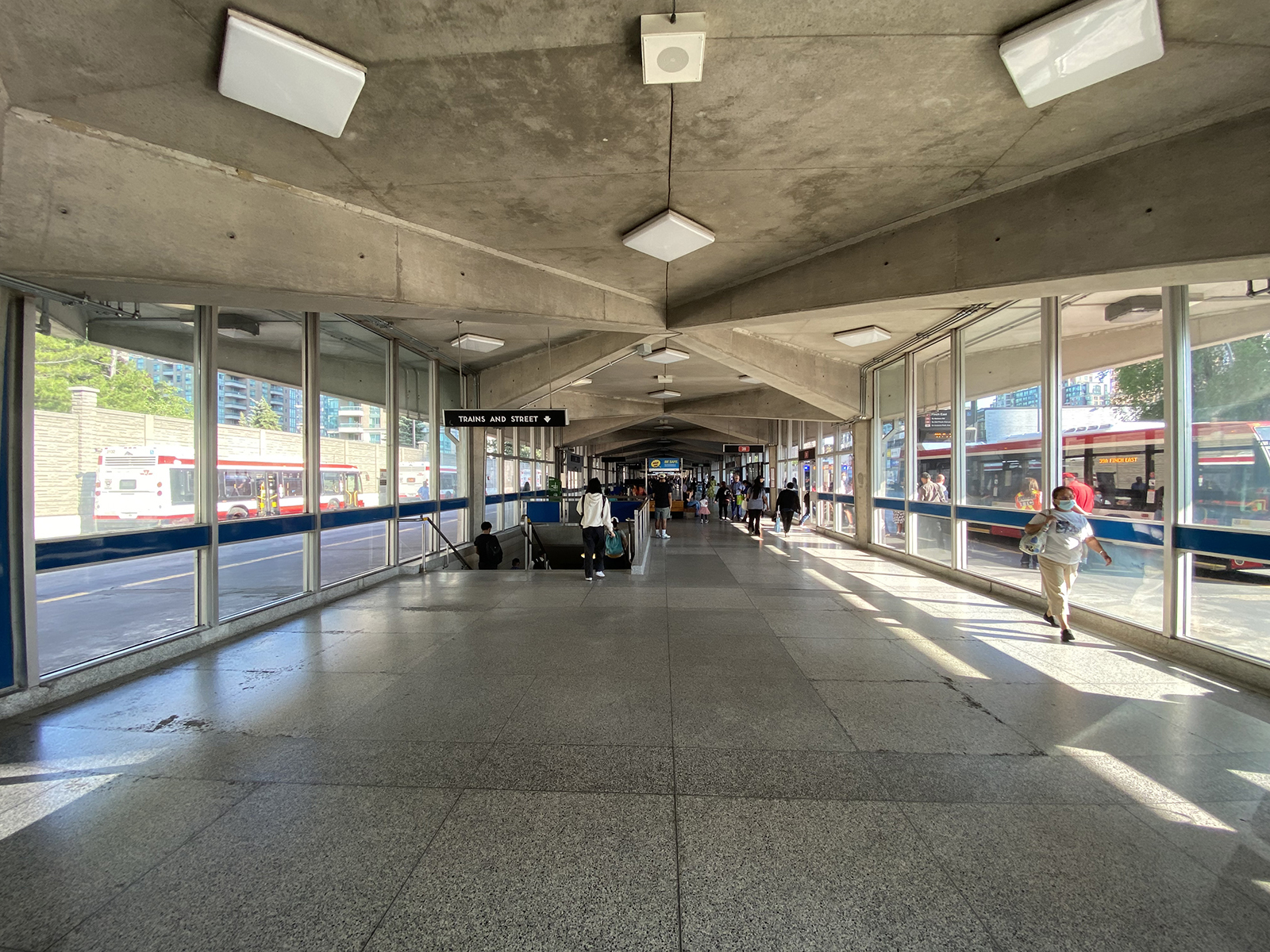
Finch Bus Terminal interior

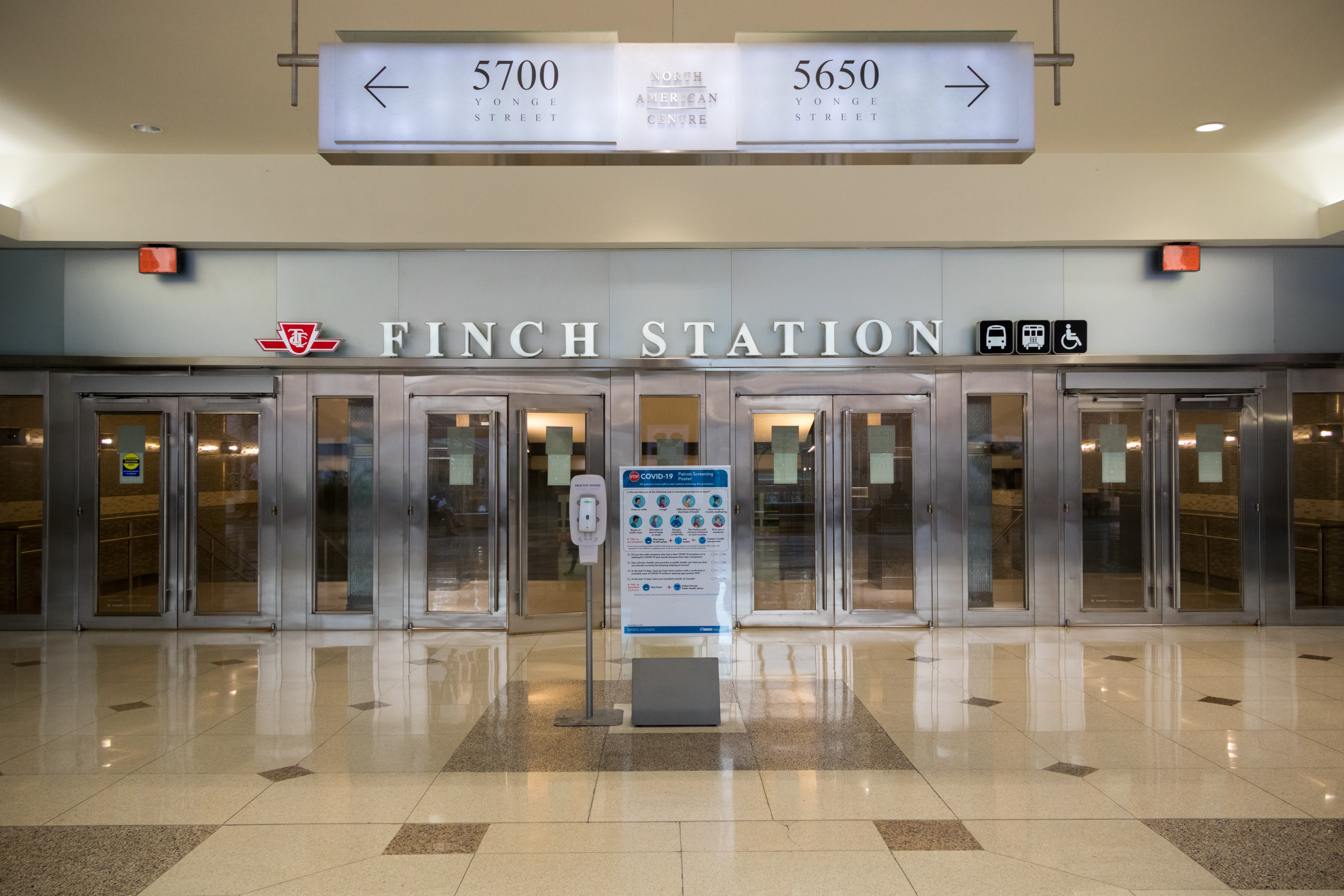
Finch station entrance at North American Centre

When the subway is closed, buses do not enter the station, and an on-street transfer is required. TTC routes serving the station include:

Bay number	Route	Name	Additional information
1	Unloading		
2	60A	Steeles West	Westbound to Pioneer Village station
2	60B	Steeles West	Westbound to Martin Grove Road via Pioneer Village station
2	60D	Steeles West	Westbound to Highway 27 via Pioneer Village station
2	960B	Steeles West Express	Westbound to Martin Grove Road via Pioneer Village station
2	960D	Steeles West Express	Westbound to Highway 27 via Pioneer Village station
3	42	Cummer	Eastbound to Middlefield Road and Dynamic Drive
3	320	Yonge	Blue Night service; northbound to Steeles Avenue and southbound to Queens Quay (On-street stop outside station)
4	97A	Yonge	Northbound to Steeles Avenue and southbound to St. Clair station (On-street stop outside station)
4	97B	Yonge	Northbound to Steeles Avenue via Yonge Boulevard and southbound to St. Clair station via Yonge Boulevard (On-street stop outside station)
4	125	Drewry	Westbound to Bathurst Street (Torresdale)
5	39A	Finch East	Eastbound to Neilson Road
5	39B	Finch East	Eastbound to Old Finch Avenue and Morningview Trail
5	39C	Finch East	Eastbound to Victoria Park Avenue and Gordon Baker Road (Rush hour service)
6	Spare		
7	939A	Finch Express	Eastbound to Kennedy station via Scarborough Centre station
7	939C	Finch Express	Eastbound to Morningside Heights (Rush hour service)
8	Line 1	Shuttle Bus	
9	Spare/unloading		
10	953A	Steeles East Express	Eastbound to Staines Road
10	953B	Steeles East Express	Eastbound to Morningside Avenue (Rush hour service)
11	53A	Steeles East	Eastbound to Staines Road
11	53B	Steeles East	Eastbound to Morningside Avenue
12	939B	Finch Express	Westbound to Finch West station
13	36	Finch West	Westbound to Finch West station
	336	Finch West	Blue Night service; westbound to Woodbine Racetrack via Humber College (On-street stop outside station)
	339	Finch East	Blue Night service; eastbound to Markham Road (On-street stop outside station)

== Nearby landmarks ==
- Plaque on the North American Life building commemorating the birthplace of former Canadian Prime Minister Lester B. Pearson
- Newtonbrook Plaza
- Finch's Hotel (historic landmark that no longer exists)

== Future ==
A planned extension of Line 1 Yonge–University from Finch to Richmond Hill in York Region would add at least five new stations. First proposed in 2007 as part of MoveOntario 2020, the current plan was announced in April 2019 by Premier Doug Ford. In September 2022, Metrolinx awarded a contract to Black & McDonald Limited to upgrade Finch station before the start of construction on the extension. Work was to include improvements to the electrical system that powered trains and extending the waterless sprinkler system over the tail tracks that were to become the new mainline north of the station.

In 2007, the Transit City proposal called for a new LRT line, then known as the Etobicoke–Finch West LRT line, to run along Finch Avenue West from Humber College station to Finch station. While the portion from Humber College to Finch West station opened in 2025 as Line 6 Finch West, the Province of Ontario had no plans to construct the portion between Finch West and Finch stations as of 2019.
