= West Hill, Toronto =

West Hill
- Neighbourhood
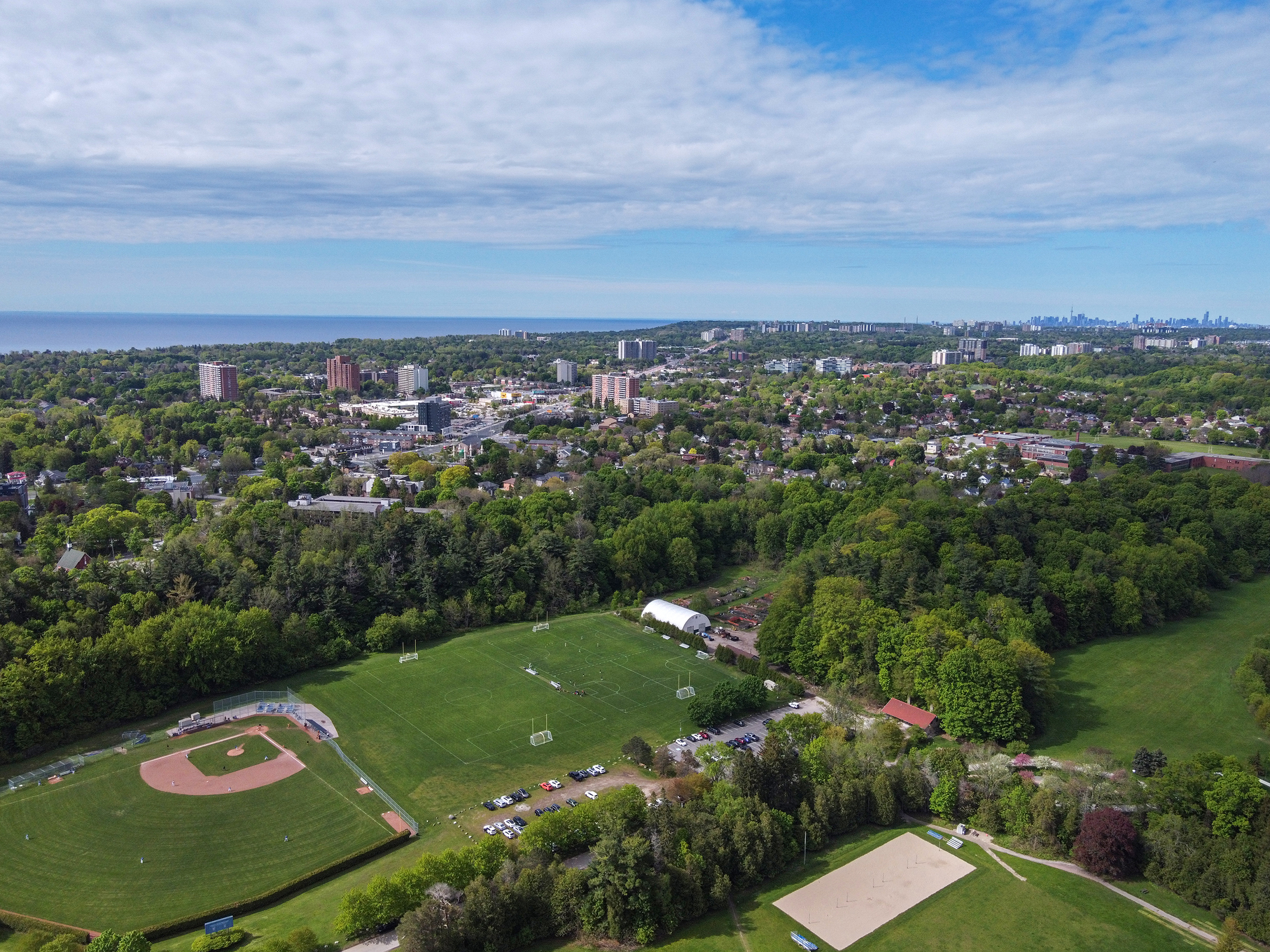
- Aerial view of West Hill in 2025

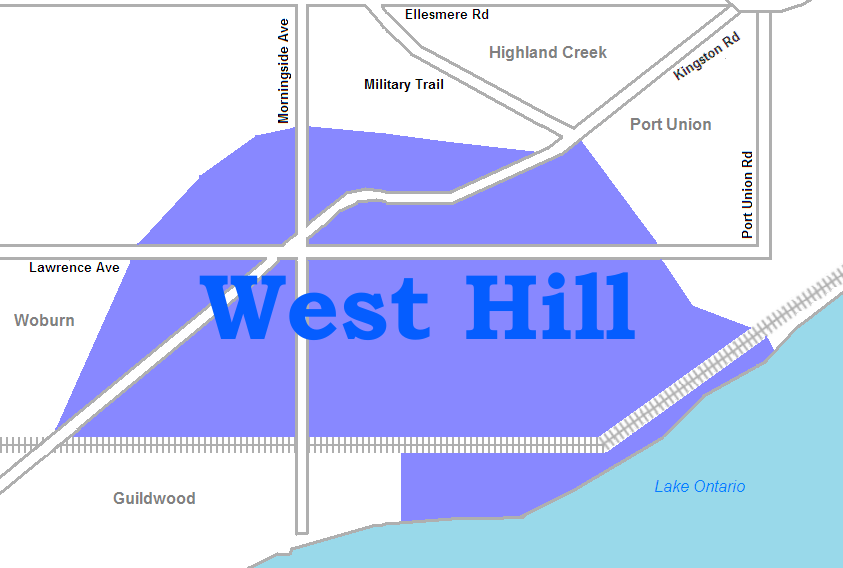
- Location of West Hill within Toronto
- Coordinates: 43°46′06″N 79°11′10″W
- Country: Canada
- Province: Ontario
- City: Toronto
- Established: 1850 Scarborough Township
- Changed municipality: 1998 Toronto from City of Scarborough

Government
  - MP: Gary Anandasangaree (Scarborough—Rouge Park) & Michael Coteau (Scarborough—Woburn)

West Hill is a neighbourhood in Toronto, Ontario, Canada. It is located in the eastern end of the city, in the former suburb of Scarborough. It is roughly bounded by Scarborough Golf Club Road and a branch of Highland Creek on the west, the CNR railway tracks and Lake Ontario on the south, and Highland Creek on the north-east. The name comes from its elevated position on the west side of Highland Creek, a deep glacial ravine.

The section east of Manse Road, which roughly splits this neighbourhood in half, is often now referred to as the Manse Valley neighbourhood. It has less commercial development and more industrial development than the western part of the neighbourhood. However, both parts were treated as part of West Hill prior to development.

== History ==
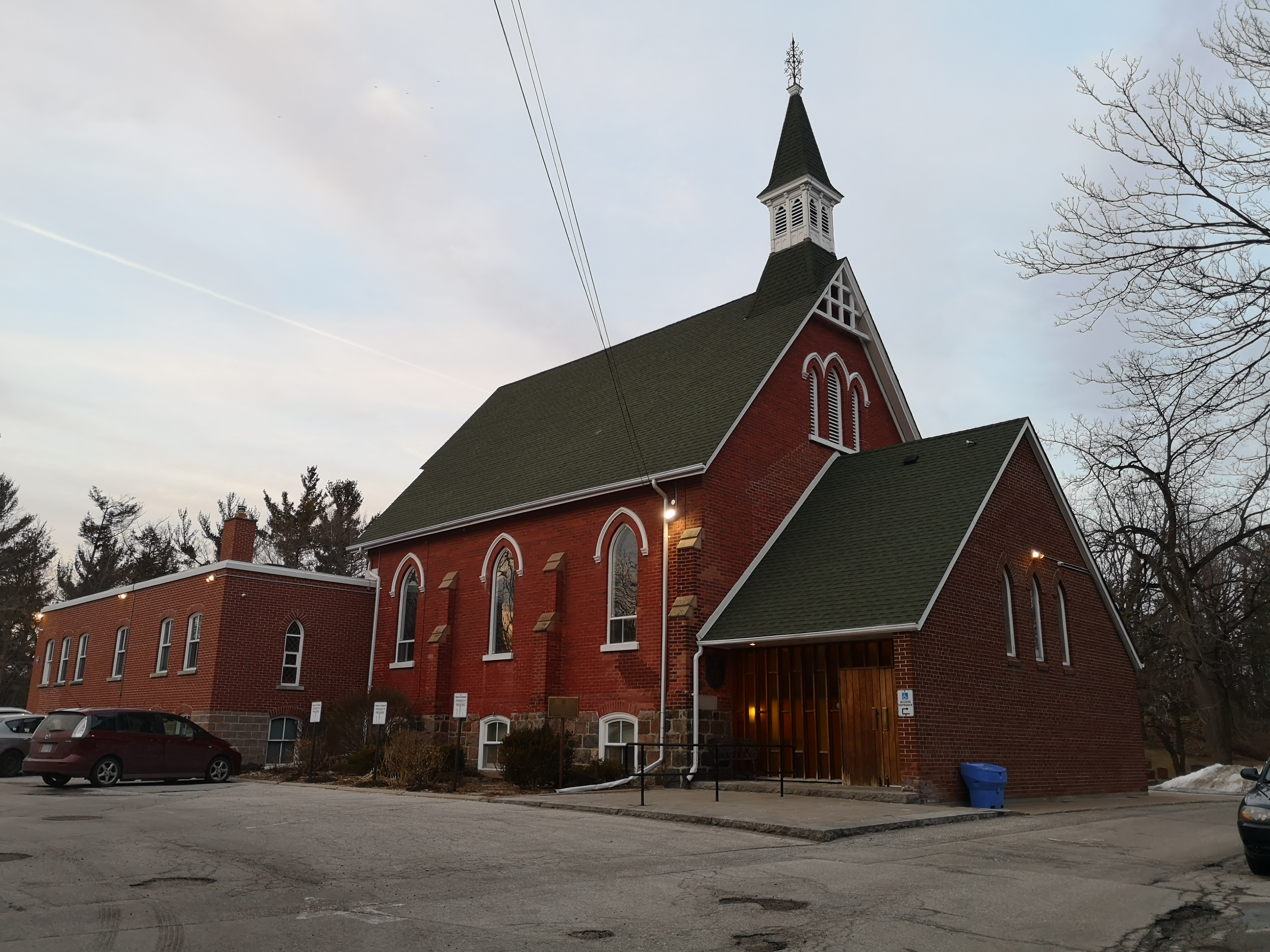
Melville Church in West Hill, near Highland Creek. The building was erected in 1851.

In the mid 19th century, what is now West Hill was part of the larger Highland Creek community, which extended from today's Galloway Rd over to the Pickering border. In 1862, Eli Shackleton took over as postmaster in Highland Creek and moved the post office from the east side of the Highland Creek valley to the west. Following Shackleton's tenure as postmaster, the post office was relocated back to the east side of the valley. In 1879, John Richardson opened a new post office on the west side of the valley officially known as "West Hill". From 1906 until the closing of the line in 1936, West Hill was the eastern terminus of the Toronto and Scarborough Electric Railway, a street-car line. West Hill Public School is one of the oldest in Toronto, a school having been built on the present site in the 1880s, although the original building was replaced by a modern facility in 1994. West Hill Collegiate Institute is also an older high school in Scarborough, having been opened in 1955.

Until after World War II, West Hill was largely rural, although the stretch of Kingston Road (including what is now Old Kingston Road) running through it had some commercial development, some even dating back to the late 19th century. The neighbourhood's oldest remaining buildings tend to be along this stretch.

In the 1950s the neighbourhood was still difficult to reach by road, except for access to the south-west towards the city because even at this point Kingston Road was a four-lane highway. However, access to the direct east and west had to navigate Highland Creek and required a steep descent and ascent. There was no access across the creek across Morningside. However, the main bus commuter bus route from downtown Toronto to Oshawa ran directly along Kingston Road as well. As such, early development in the neighbourhood clustered around Kingston Road starting in the 1950s. The first subdivisions stretched along the straight north–south roads running off Kingston Road, primarily those existing road allowances which were close together and allowed for back-to-back lots with minimum frontage and depth. Larger plots of land that were developed in the late 1950s through the 1970s tended to be laid out with curved roads, short connecting roads and dead end streets that made for quieter neighbourhoods but resulted in irregular lot sizes.

=== Development (1960–present) ===
Before the completion of Highway 401 in the 1960s, West Hill was one of the major shopping areas in the region. In the 1950s, it served communities as far away as Oshawa. However, as development spread east and north along the new highway, major commercial developments became less viable. A major regional shopping centre, Morningside Mall, built in the late 1970s, was left without a major tenant when Wal-Mart, Dominion, and Shoppers Drug Mart abandoned the mall. Morningside Mall was completely demolished as of late 2007, and has been replaced by Morningside Crossing, a plaza.

Another change occasioned by the building of Highway 401 was a drop in business for the large number of motels lining Kingston Road. Most of the motel sites have been redeveloped as commercial sites, and many of the remaining motels serve as temporary housing for Toronto's homeless.

The neighbourhood grew quickly and by the mid-1960s there were several new public schools to serve the new residents, who were generally young families drawn to the lower home prices in the area. The area's K-6 and K-8 public schools, Galloway Road, Eastview, Peter Secor, William G. Miller, and Heron Park, were all built in this period, as was the separate school, St. Martin de Porres. By the 1970s, two technical high schools, Sir Robert Borden and Maplewood, had joined West Hill C.I., as did Joseph Brant, a senior public school that accepted grades 7-8 from three feeder schools.

At the times of the earliest developments, sanitary sewer service had not been extended this far east. House lots generally had to be large to accommodate septic tanks. Development was largely limited to single family homes and low rise apartment blocks.

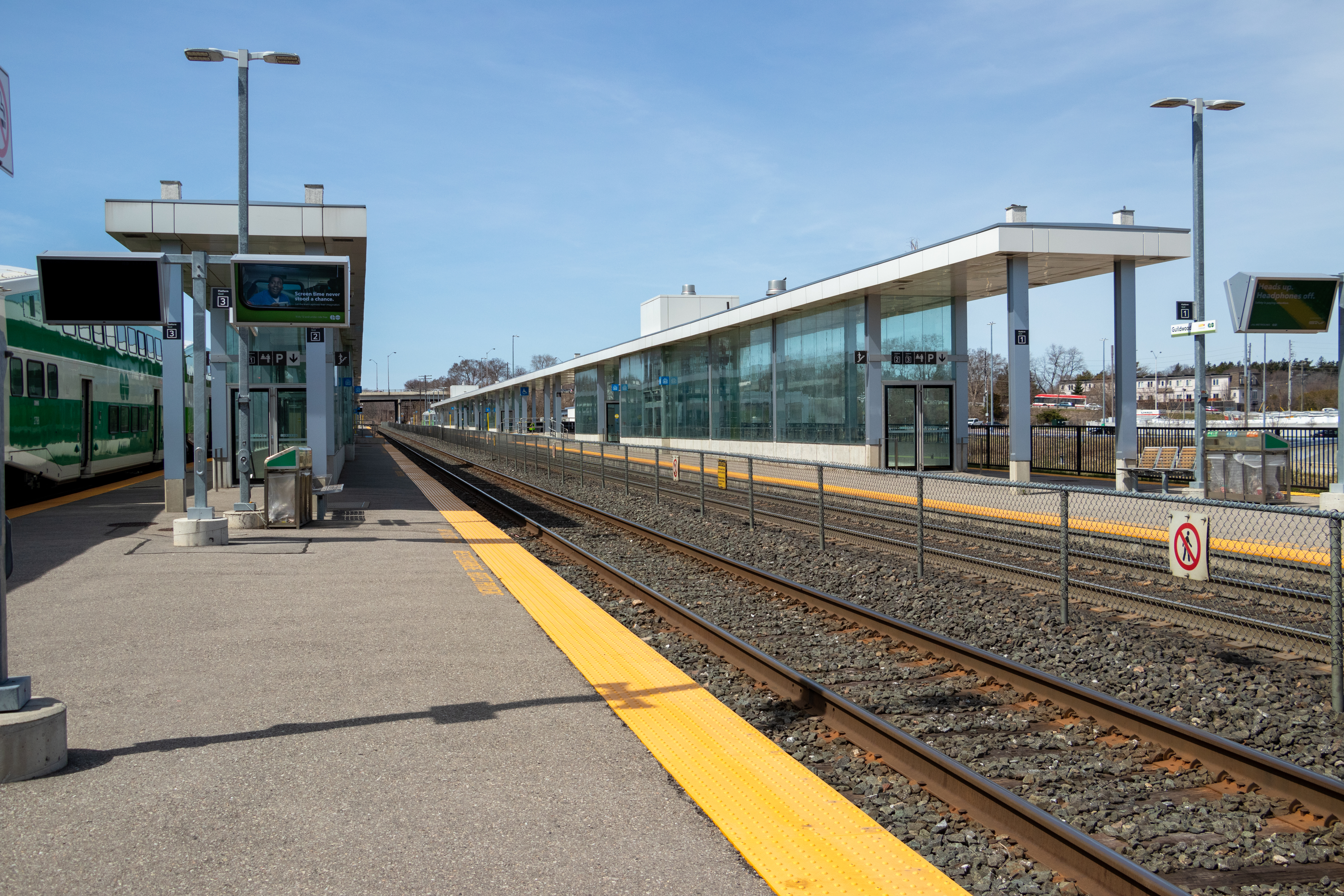
Guildwood GO Station was opened in 1967, allowing for direct commuter connections to Downtown Toronto.

Road and traffic access to the neighbourhood quickly improved. During the 1960s, new bridges were built spanning the deep sections of Highland Creek on Lawrence, Morningside and Kingston. This allowed direct access to the new Highway 401 to the east and west. The introduction of the GO Train at Guildwood Station allowed direct commuter connections into the city. The completion of the Bloor-Danforth subway line to Warden Station allowed more frequent TTC bus service into the neighbourhood. Service improved again when the subway was extended to Kennedy station

Commercial development centered around the triangle where Kingston, Lawrence and Morningside met, and spread out along Kingston Road and parts of Morningside Avenue. In the south-eastern part of the neighbourhood, there was industrial development along Coronation Drive, mostly catering to the chemical industry.

City services continued to improve and in the 1970s high rise apartment buildings were introduced. Most homes in the neighbourhood were upgraded to have both storm and sanitary sewers. This allowed redevelopment of many larger lots to allow more homes in existing space. By the late 1970s, almost all the land in the neighbourhood had been developed. Development peaked in the late 1970s with the building of Morningside Mall, an enclosed mall built on the site of a strip plaza, anchored by Woolco and Dominion.

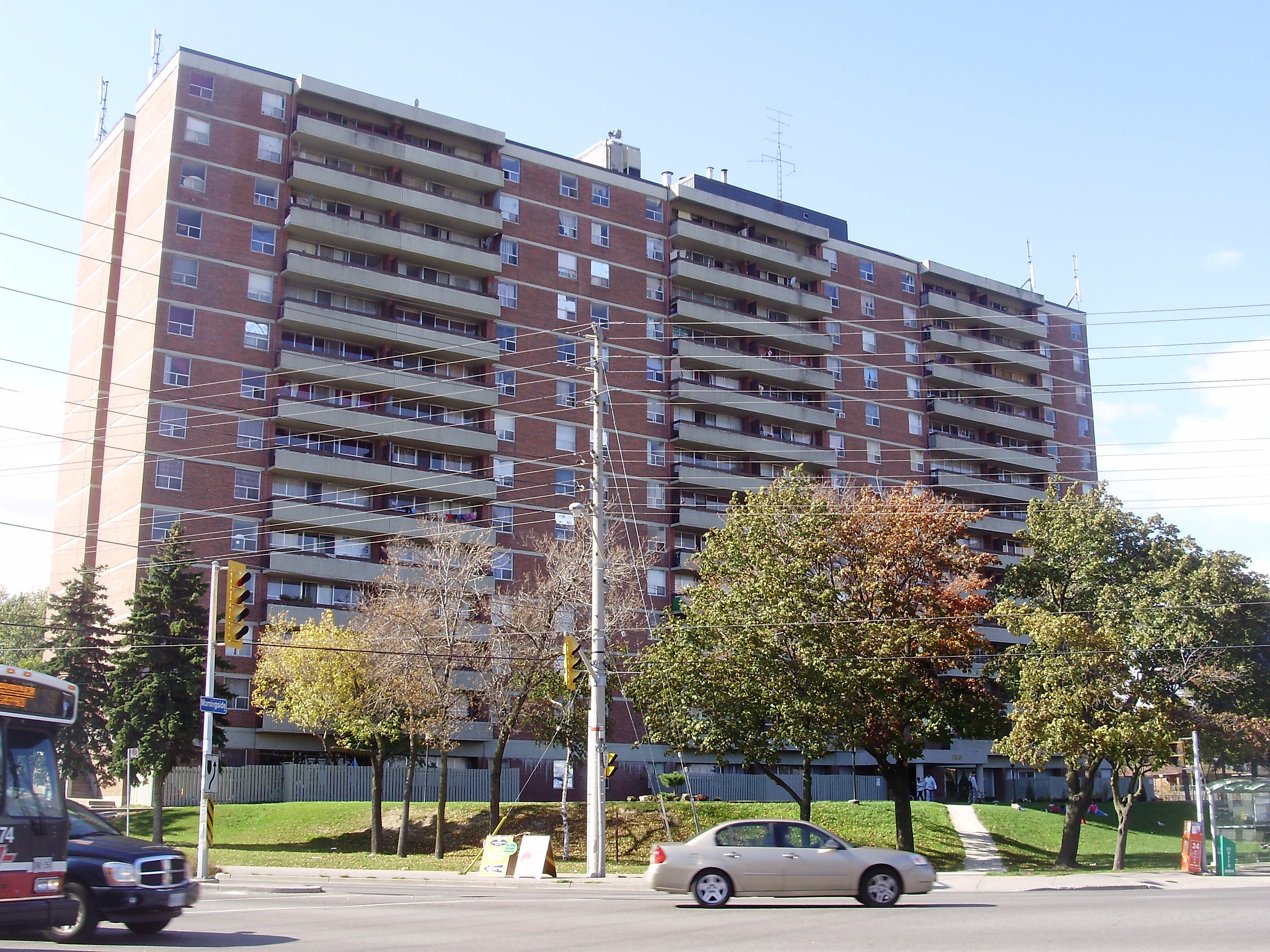
High-rise apartment buildings were erected in West Hill during the 1970s, largely along Kingston Road.

However, although the development of the neighbourhood continued into the 1980s, its character started to change as many of the original residents started to age and residential patterns in Scarborough started to change. Commercial development in the Morningside and Malvern neighbourhoods improved, and residents who used to come to West Hill to shop now no longer had to do so. It was clear that Toronto was overbuilt with shopping centers and Morningside Mall started only to draw from the immediate neighbourhood as larger nearby malls such as Cedarbrae Mall and Scarborough Town Centre had better road access.

As such, recent re-development in the neighbourhood has been centred along the commercial areas surrounding Kingston Road. Disused commercial properties are often redeveloped as high density residential townhouses.

Home prices in the neighbourhood generally remain below average for the City of Toronto as a whole despite the average size of homes (predominately two-bedroom bungalows) and larger lot sizes. In addition, the neighbourhood's population is slowly shrinking as the resident per home average continues to drop. Newcomers to the neighbourhood tend to be younger families looking for inexpensive housing in the city with convenient commuting connections.

In May 2004, police arrested 75 members of the Galloway Boys, a West Hill street gang.

== Education ==
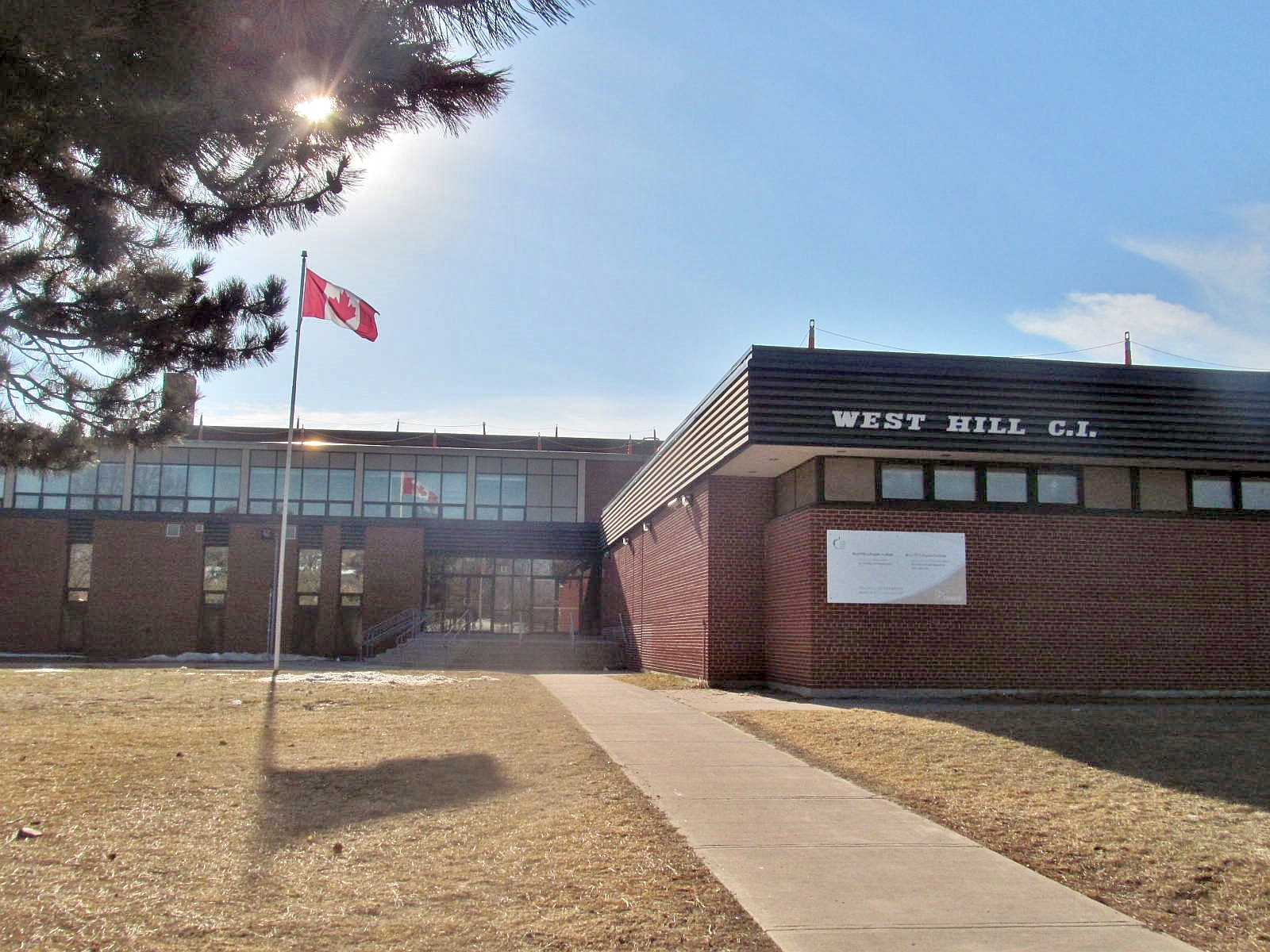
West Hill Collegiate Institute is a public secondary school situated in West Hill.

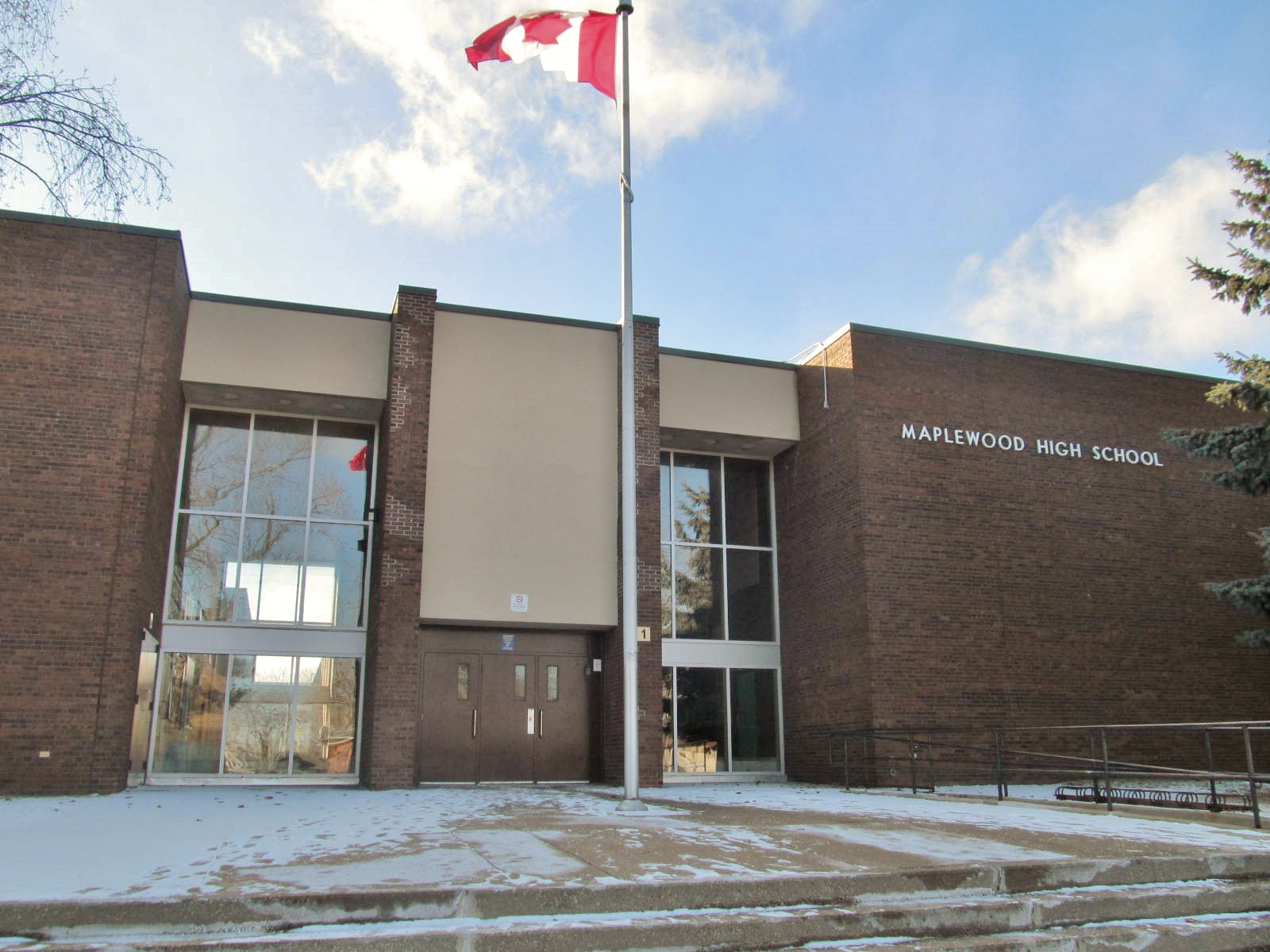
Maplewood High School is a public vocational high school.

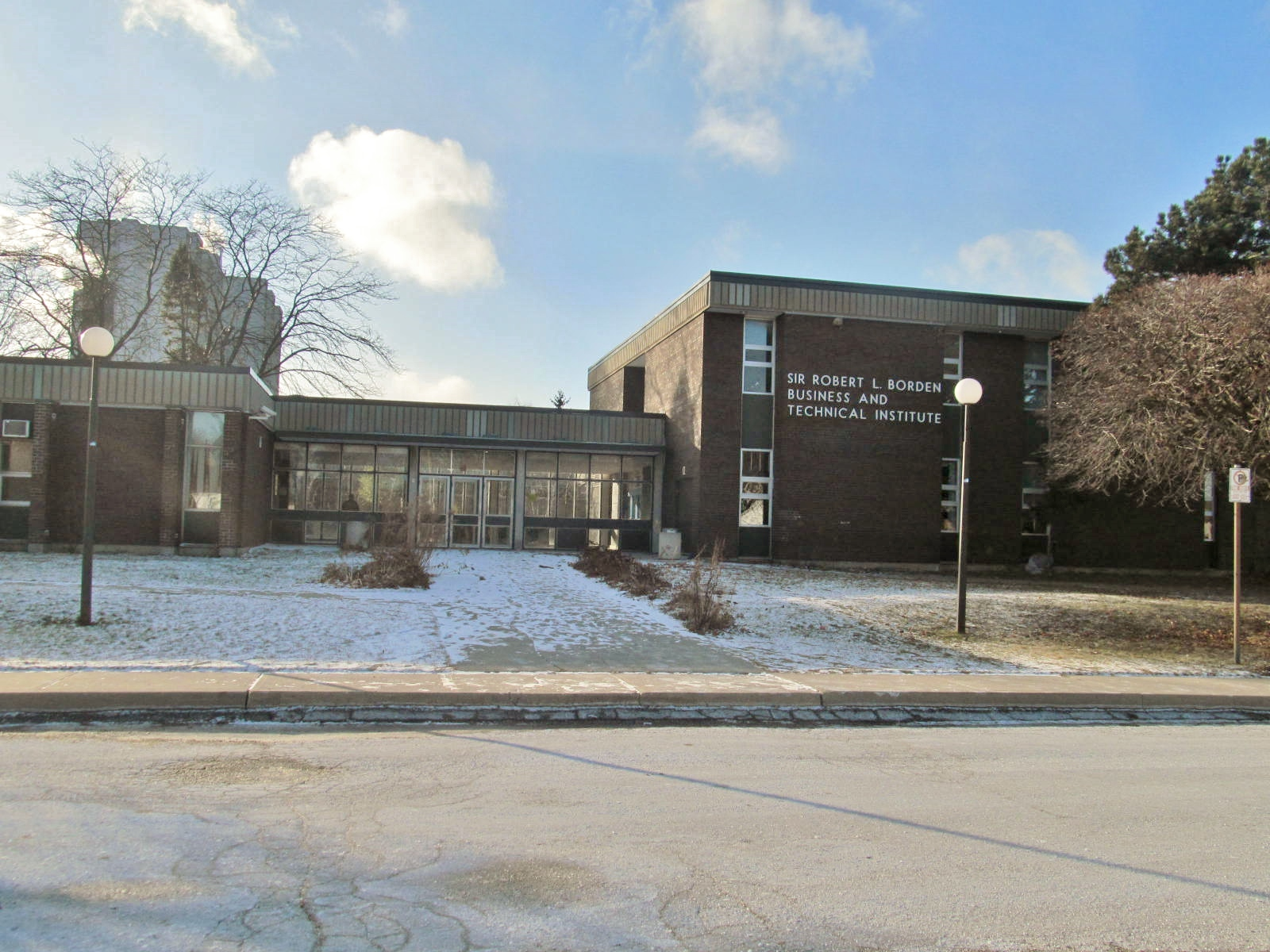
Sir Robert L. Borden Business and Technical Institute used to serve as a technical school in the area until it was shut down.

Three public school boards operate in West Hill, the Conseil scolaire Viamonde (CSV), the Toronto Catholic District School Board (TCDSB), and the Toronto District School Board (TDSB). TCDSB are separate public school boards, whereas CSV, and TDSB are secular public school boards, with the former being French first language school board, and the latter being English first language school board.

TDSB operates two active secondary school in the neighbourhood, West Hill Collegiate Institute. It was constructed in 1954 and opened to 376 students on September 6, 1955.

Schools in West Hill that are operated by public school boards include:

- Académie Alexandre-Dumas (CSV)
- Eastview Public School
- Galloway Public School
- Jack Miner Senior Public School
- Poplar Road Junior Public school
- St. Malachy Catholic School
- St. Martin de Porres Catholic School
- William G. Miller Public School (TDSB)
- Joseph Brant Public School was opened in 1969 as a senior school named after Joseph Brant the Mohawk leader. Since 2012, the school operates from Junior Kindergarten to Grade 8 after the closure of two feeder schools: the adjacent Heron Park Junior Public School and Peter Secor Junior Public School.
- Maplewood High School is a junior vocational secondary school opened in 1967 modeled after Tabor Park Vocational School. It is a specialized school providing students with special needs.
- Sir Robert L. Borden Business and Technical Institute was built in 1965 and opened in 1966. This school, like Bendale, offered many business-oriented and technical courses in addition to academic programs. After the school closed in 2016, the TDSB retained ownership of the building pending its sale.

== Recreation ==
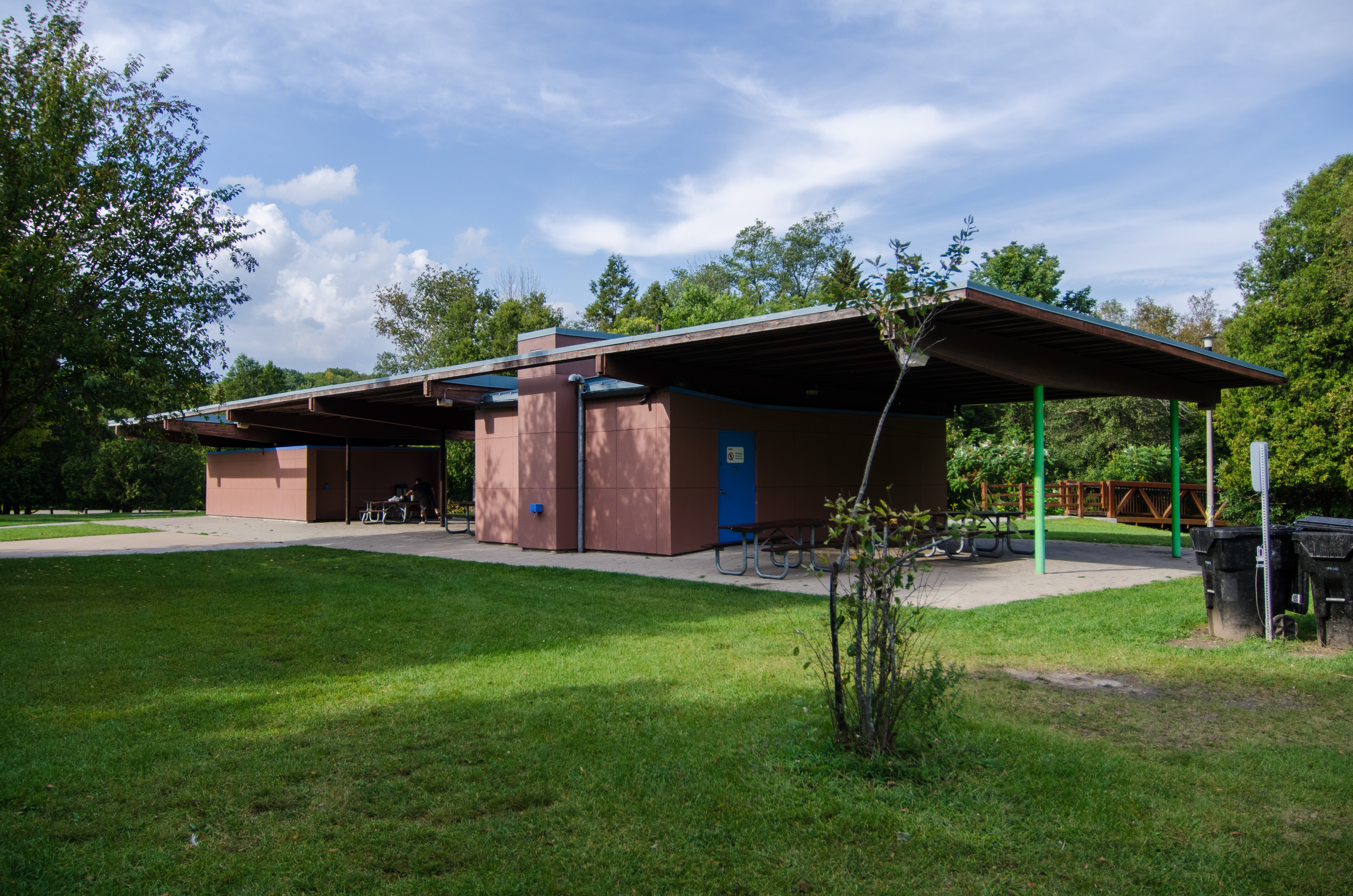
Morningside Park is one of three municipal parks that surrounds West Hill along its northern boundaries.

West Hill is bordered on three sides by the Highland Creek, the community is surrounded by a system of parks. Morningside Park, and Colonel Danforth Park are located along the creek, while East Point Park is located along Lake Ontario at the eastern end of the Scarborough Bluffs. Parks in West Hill are managed by the Toronto Parks, Forestry and Recreation Division.

The area has numerous sports facilities, including an indoor arena and a baseball diamond at Heron Park, and two swimming pools, one of which is indoor. There are athletics facilities at the nearby University of Toronto Scarborough (UTSC), including Dan Lang Field and the UTSC Tennis Centre. Other public amenities includes the Morningside branch of the Toronto Public Library, built further east of the former site at Morningside Mall, roughly at the geographical centre of the neighbourhood, on Lawrence Avenue, just west of Manse Road.

West Hill has a good mix of commercial establishments far more typical of an older neighbourhood than a new suburb. Fast food establishments do not dominate and there are many sit-down restaurants featuring a variety of cuisines including, Canadian Chinese, Caribbean and Middle Eastern, echoing the ethnic diversity of the neighbourhood. There are two supermarkets and numerous smaller food outlets. The area is well served by physicians, dentists and lawyers and features three pharmacies, including both major chains.

== Transportation ==
The main routes through West Hill are Kingston Road (part of the former Highway 2), Morningside Avenue and Lawrence Avenue East.

The Toronto Transit Commission's (TTC) bus service provides public transportation through the neighbourhood, operating on all the major streets in the area, allowing access to TTC's Line 2 Bloor-Danforth subway at Kennedy station and formerly, the Line 3 Scarborough at Lawrence East station. Located along the boundary of Guildwood and West Hill is Guildwood GO Station. The station provides access to GO Transit's commuter rail and bus services, as well as Via Rail's intercity rail routes.

== Notable places ==
- St. Margaret in-the-Pines - chapel (c. 1906) and cemetery; it was home to Anglican Church from 1833 to 1846; abandoned for Christ Church in Scarborough Village. It was destroyed in a fire in 1904 and rebuilt as a Chapel.
