= John Finch's Hotel =

Coordinates: 43.781087°N 79.414244°W

Finch Hotel was an inn located in current-day Toronto, Ontario, Canada. It was opened in 1848 by John Finch on Lot #2, Concession #1, with a land size of 200 acres (81 ha). Before Finch bought the property in 1847, it was owned by John and Alexander Montgomery. Finch retired in 1860 and leased it to a succession of innkeepers before selling it to Charles McBride in 1873. McBride demolished the hotel and used the timber from it to build the Bedford Park Hotel.

Finch Avenue, a main arterial road in Toronto and the surrounding Peel Region and Durham Region, was named after John Finch.

== Information ==
Finch Hotel was operated by a series of innkeepers:

- Thomas Palmer 1848-1860
- John Likens 1860-1864
- John Fenley 1869-1871
- William Kirk 1871-1873

The inn was sold to Charles McBride, who demolished the building and took timbers to build the Bedford Park Hotel at another site on Yonge Street. The site is now a parkette and condos on 1 and 3 Pemberton Avenue. To the west of the hotel was Stop 35 of the North Yonge Railways, a radial railway that ran from Toronto to Lake Simcoe.

== See also ==
- Finch Avenue

== Notes ==
- A Glimpse of Toronto's History City Planning Division, Urban Development Services, City of Toronto 2001, MPLS 087
