= Morningside Avenue (Toronto) =

Road in Toronto, Ontario, Canada

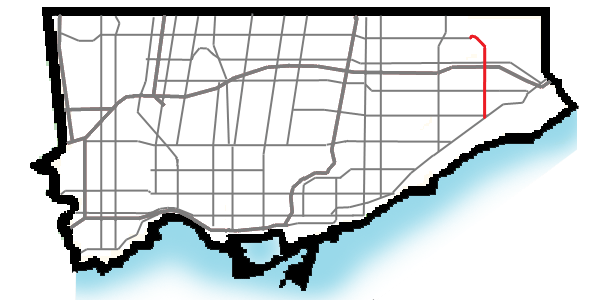
- Maintained by: City of Toronto
- Location: Toronto
- South end: Guildwood Parkway
- Major junctions: Lawrence Avenue East; Kingston Road; Ellesmere Road; Highway 401; Sheppard Avenue East
- North end: McNicoll Avenue

Other
Nearby arterial roads in Toronto
← Markham Road	Meadowvale Road →

Morningside Avenue is a suburban arterial road in Toronto, Ontario, Canada. It is entirely within Scarborough, running north by north-west from the Scarborough Bluffs overlooking Lake Ontario to the eastern terminus of McNicoll Avenue near the Rouge River valley. A short extension from Steeles Avenue to Passmore Avenue has been completed but the connection to the southern section to McNicoll Avenue is still not completed.

It is not to be confused with Morningside Avenue, a minor residential road (short of Riverside Drive to Ellis Avenue) in the old Toronto neighbourhood of Swansea. This Morningside Avenue was originally the extension of College Street or Grenadier Road from Parkside Drive but cancelled as High Park was developed.

== Route description ==
The foot of Morningside is located at Guildwood Parkway on the shores of Lake Ontario, and traces the original Scarborough Township Lot 10 line north-east toward the commercial centre of the West Hill neighbourhood at Kingston Road. West Hill takes its name from its position above the broad valley of Highland Creek. The valley is the site of Morningside Park, one of Toronto's largest. Within the valley at the intersection of Ellesmere Road is the Morningside Campus of Centennial College and the Scarborough campus of the University of Toronto, of which Morningside Avenue forms the western boundary. Beyond the valley, which was the former northern terminus, the present route was named "Littles Road" after an early family in the area. Between Sheppard and Finch Avenues, Morningside serves as the eastern boundary of the Malvern neighbourhood. The route veers to the north-west north of Sheppard Avenue, skirting the ravine of Morningside Creek and Rouge Park.

Communities lining the northern reaches of the street, and those nearby across the city boundary in Markham, are constrained by the topographic and legislative boundaries of Rouge Park. A northern extension to Morningside Avenue was proposed, traversing the Brookside and Morningside Heights neighbourhoods to connect with the exurban community of Box Grove. These plans have since been canceled due to concerns that the extension would necessitate construction in a sensitive section of Rouge Park.

The low 3.7 m (12.1 ft), narrow, one-lane railroad underpass at Finch Avenue, dating back to when it was a rural road, was replaced in 2009, allowing 4 lanes of traffic to pass below uninterrupted. McNicoll Avenue was later extended east terminating at a newly built extension of Morningside Avenue, while Oasis Blvd continues east of Morningside Avenue as a residential neighbourhood.

== Public transit ==
Morningside Avenue is mainly served by the 116 Morningside bus route from Guildwood Parkway to Nightstar Road. The 133 Neilson and 53A Steeles East serve north of this to McNicoll Ave/Oasis Blvd. The 53B Steeles East and 102B/C Markham Road both serve the northern extension of Morningside from Passmore Avenue to Steeles Avenue East. The 12D Kingston Road, 39B Finch East, 131 Nugget, 902 Markham Road Express, 905 Eglinton East Express, 939C Finch Express, and 953 Steeles East Express all serve parts of Morningside, with the 902, 905, 939C, and 953 running express in the areas they serve.

A portion of Morningside Avenue between Kingston Road and Ellesmere Road contains dedicated RapidTO bus lanes.

== Future ==
Morningside Avenue is planned to be extended to Steeles Avenue (initially from Passmore Avenue to McNicoll Avenue and then to Steeles) in the future to connect to Donald Cousens Parkway via a widened Steeles Avenue. As of December 2019, the Steeles widening project is expected to start construction in 2022, and although the detailed design of the Morningside extension is expected to be completed in 2020, no schedule has been announced for the extension yet.

== Attractions and points of interest ==
- West Hill Collegiate Institute
- Morningside Park
- Centennial HP Science and Technology Centre
- University of Toronto Scarborough on nearby Military Trail
