= Finch Avenue =

Road in Toronto, Ontario, Canada

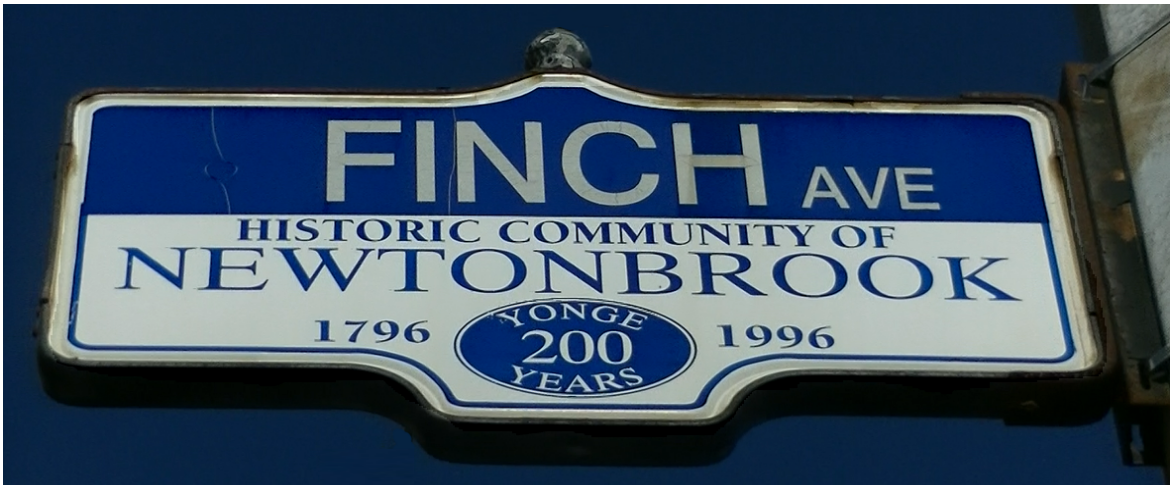
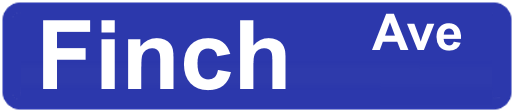
- Peel Regional Road 2 Durham Regional Road 37
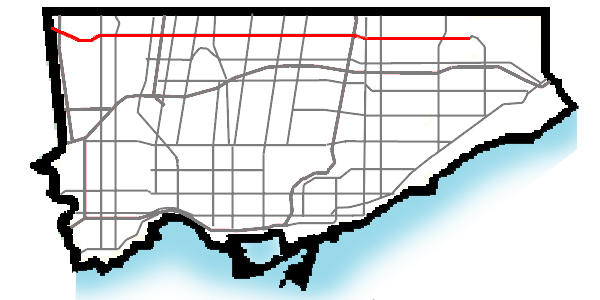
- Namesake: John Finch
- Maintained by: City of Toronto; Region of Peel; Region of Durham
- Length: 52 km (32 mi)
- Location: Toronto; Mississauga; Brampton; Pickering
- West end: Steeles Avenue in Brampton
- Major junctions: Highway 427 (Former) Highway 27; Martin Grove Road; Albion Road; Kipling Avenue; Islington Avenue; Weston Road; Highway 400; Jane Street; Keele Street; Dufferin Street; Bathurst Street; Yonge Street; Bayview Avenue; Leslie Street; Don Mills Road; Highway 404; Victoria Park Avenue; Warden Avenue; Kennedy Road; McCowan Road; Markham Road; Neilson Road; Morningside Avenue —Gap— Scarborough-Pickering Townline; Atona Road; Whites Road
- East end: Dead end east of Brock Road in Pickering

Other
Nearby arterial roads in Toronto
← Sheppard Avenue	Steeles Avenue →

Finch Avenue is an arterial thoroughfare that travels east–west in Toronto, Ontario, Canada. The road continues west into the Regional Municipality of Peel as Regional Road 2 and east into the Regional Municipality of Durham as Regional Road 37.

The road is considered a high-density transit corridor by Metrolinx. At its intersection with Yonge Street in North York, the Finch subway station and Finch Bus Terminal carry some of the highest numbers of commuters in the city.

== History ==
The intersection of Bayview and Finch was opened October 1960, eliminating a jog in both roads over Newtonbrook Creek

Finch Avenue was named after hotel owner John Finch, who operated John Finch's Hotel at the northeast corner of Finch Avenue and Yonge Street. The road allowance was a concession road, and at one time, there were a number of older churches, schoolhouses, and cemeteries on each side of the road. In the 1950s, Ontario Hydro built a series of transmission lines around Toronto, and paralleled Finch from Highway 400 eastward into Pickering. A compressed natural gas pipeline also follows this routing.

As suburban development in North York progressed northward in the 1960s, Finch was rapidly reconstructed from a gravel road into a four-laned traffic artery. This began with the realignment of several sections, such as at Bayview where Newtonbrook Creek flows diagonally beneath the crossroads. A rail overpass west of Leslie was built by 1968.

In the west, Finch originally ended at the Humber River at Islington Avenue. A separate western section was later constructed as development occurred in the-then Borough of Etobicoke. Traffic proceeding west had to travel on Islington, south across the Humber to Albion Road, and west beyond Kipling Avenue to reach it. In the early 1990s, this gap was closed. Earlier, in the 1980s a short extension was built northwestward into Mississauga and Brampton with the construction of Highway 427, following the former Toronto Gore Township Concession 3, which originally spurred off Indian Line, the precursor to the 427. Finch ends at Steeles Avenue, and Gorewood Drive continues it for a short distance north of Highway 407, where the concession is cut off by the Claireville Conservation Area. The concession is then called McVean Drive in northeastern Brampton, north of Queen Street, the former Highway 7. It then continues into Caledon as Centreville Creek Road.

On August 19, 2005, a freak rainstorm in Toronto caused the Black Creek water level to rise, creating a sinkhole approximately 7 m (23 ft) deep along a section of Finch Avenue West near Sentinel Road (due south of York University between Keele and Jane Streets). Two lanes reopened in late 2005, and the remaining lanes opened in April 2006. On July 24, 2009, two sinkholes appeared on Finch Avenue West between Dufferin Street and Bathurst Street.

== Route description ==
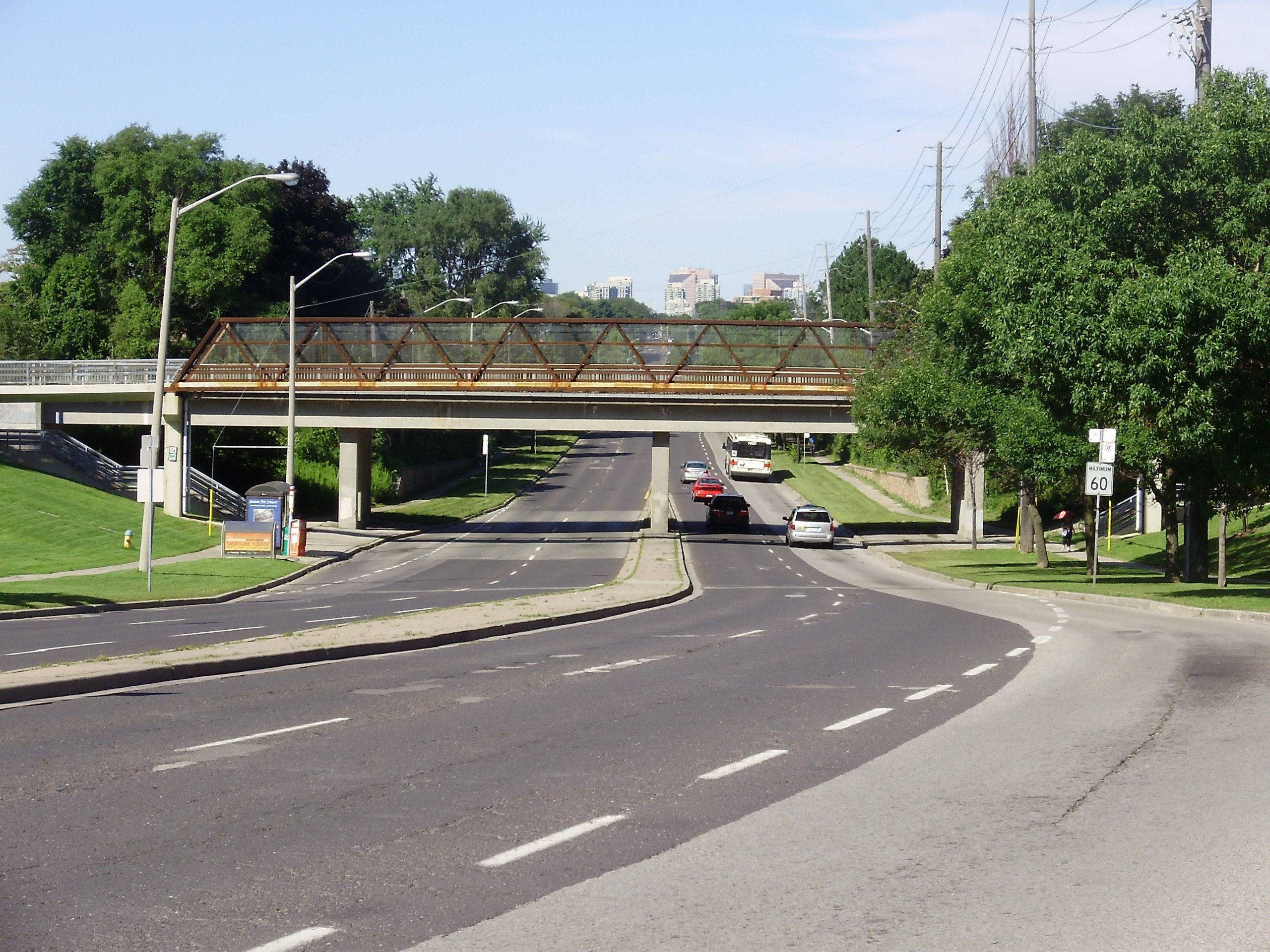
Finch at Old Cummer in 2008

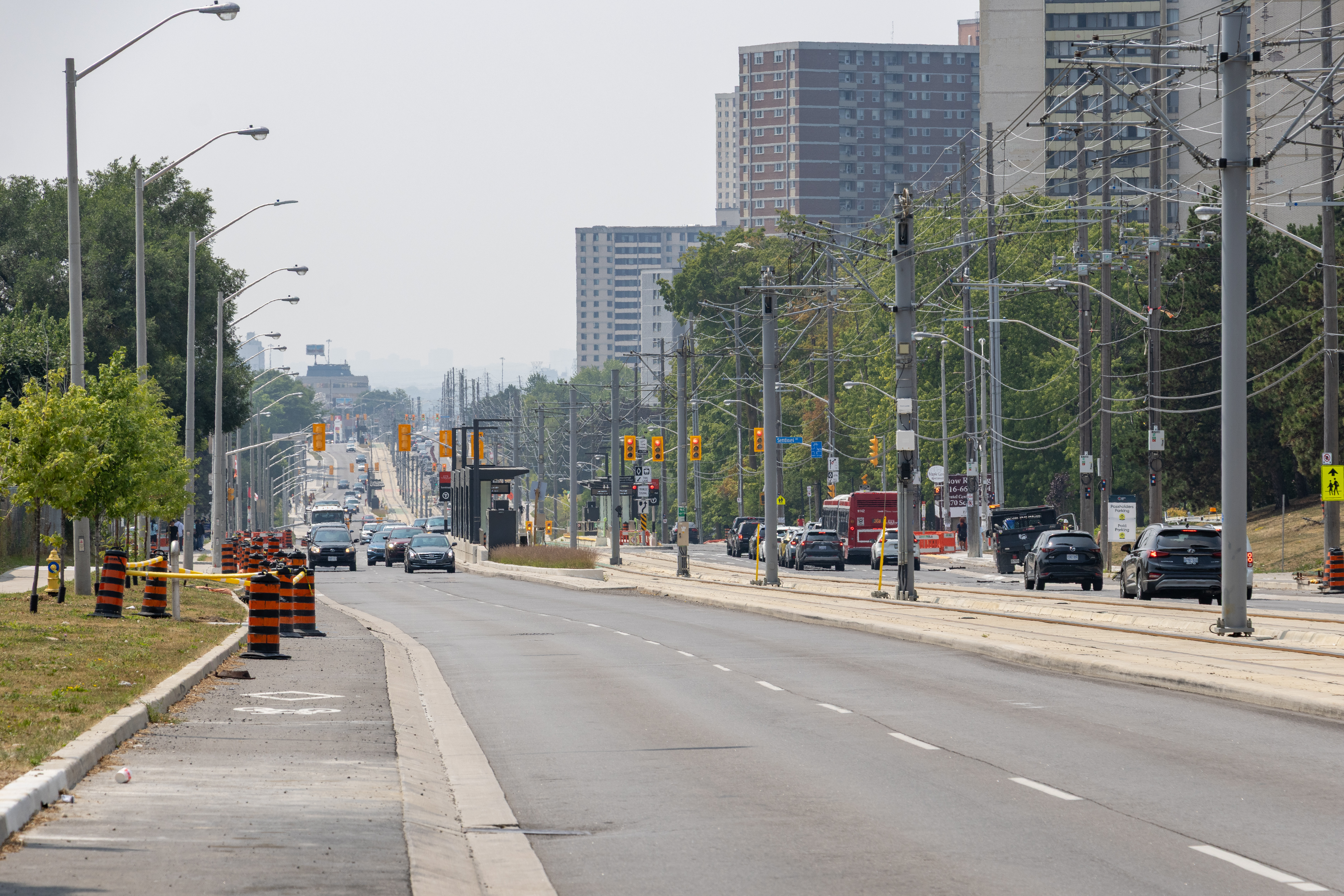
Finch near Sentinel Road

Despite its length (one of the longest streets in the Greater Toronto Area), few major landmarks are on Finch; it runs primarily through business and residential areas. The North York City Centre area, which runs south from Finch's intersection with Yonge Street, has many condominium and office high-rises.

Most of Finch Avenue west of Morningside Avenue is a four- to six-lane principal arterial, with a speed limit of 50 km/h (31–40 mph) in most sections. A part between Markham Road and Midland Avenue remains at 60 km/h. East of Morningside, Finch Ave. E becomes Staines Rd., a collector road that runs through residential communities, northeast to Steeles Ave. E. East of Morningside, the road is signed as Old Finch Avenue, requiring connections with several north–south streets (Sewells Road, Meadowvale Road and Plug Hat Road) before continuing briefly at the south end of Beare Road. Heading east, it enters into the City of Pickering in Durham Region after Scarborough-Pickering Townline, where it is also known as Durham Regional Road 37.

In Pickering, Finch Avenue is also known as Durham Road # 37 and continues east to Brock Road (Durham Regional Road 1). It ends at a cul-de-sac at Kingston Road (Durham Regional Highway 2 and formerly provincial Highway 2), and Kingston Rd. continues the concession line to the eastern boundary of Oshawa.

In Mississauga and Brampton, Finch Avenue is designated as Peel Regional Road 2, and is the shortest road corridor under the jurisdiction of the Region of Peel.

== Public transit ==
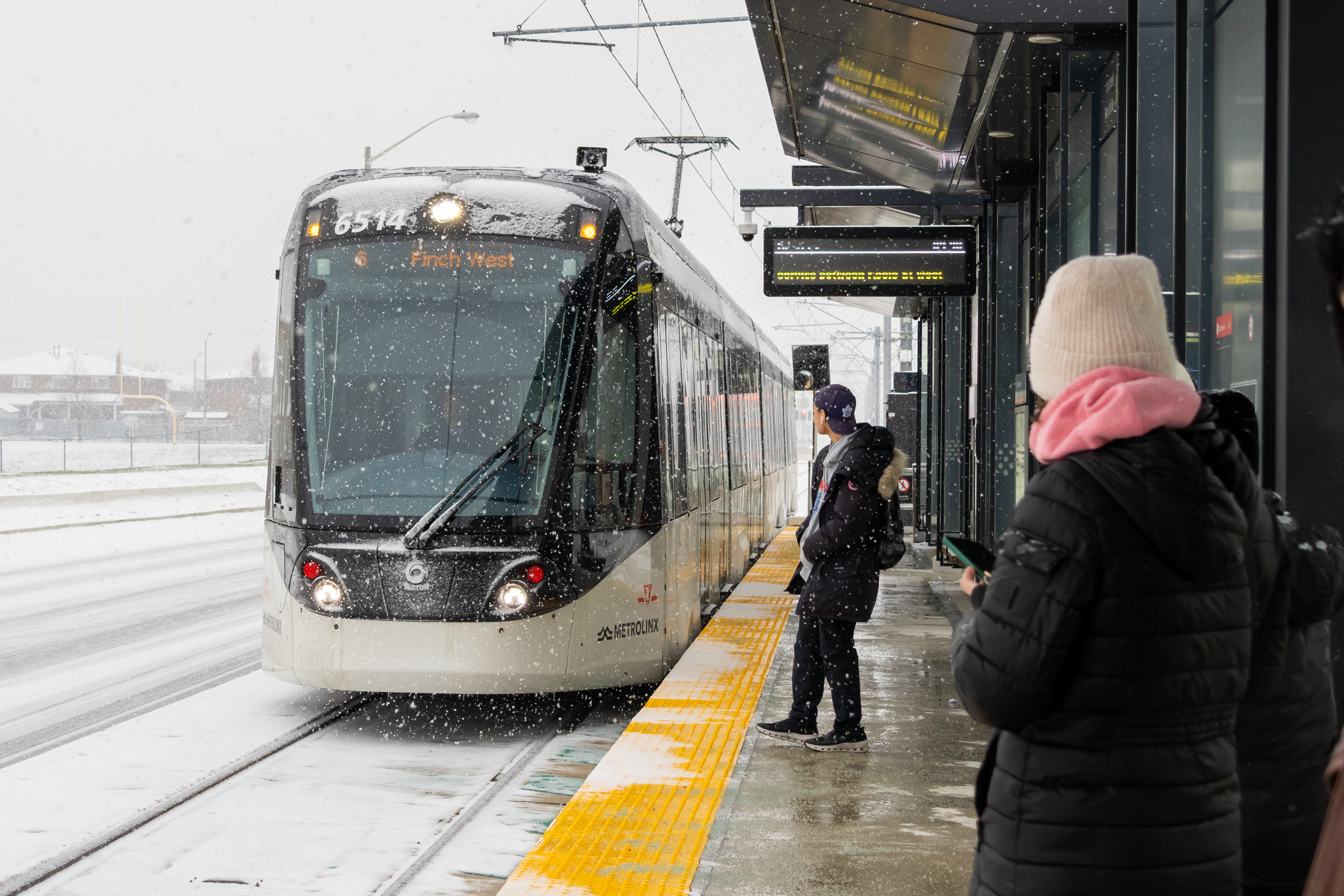
A light rail vehicle at the Martin Grove stop on Line 6 Finch West

Finch station (on the eastern branch of Line 1 Yonge–University of the Toronto subway) is located at the intersection of Finch Avenue and Yonge Street. It is the northern terminus of the eastern branch and is a major regional transit hub. The Finch Bus Terminal, a hub for GO Transit and York Region Transit buses, is next to the station and connected to it through its concourse level.

Finch West station is located at the intersection of Finch Avenue and Keele Street along the western branch of Line 1. It is the eastern terminus of Line 6 Finch West, a light rail line that serves most of the western third of Finch Avenue within Toronto and ends at Humber College station near Highway 27. It opened on December 7, 2025.

Buses from the Toronto Transit Commission (TTC) serve the remainder of the street in Toronto 24 hours a day with regular routes (36 Finch West and 39 Finch East) and Blue Night Network routes (336 Finch West and 339 Finch East). One express route, 939 Finch Express, provides faster, limited-stop service along Finch Avenue between Finch West station and Morningside Avenue, before turning south off Finch to connect to Scarborough Centre station and beyond.

West of the terminus of Line 6 at Humber College station, the street is served by Brampton transit bus routes 11 Steeles and 511 Züm Steeles (the latter being a bus rapid transit route), which connect with it at the adjacent Humber College Bus Terminal. These routes serve Finch until its end at Steeles Avenue, where they continue west to serve Steeles through Brampton.

== Landmarks and neighbourhoods ==
Points of interest along Finch from west to east:

- Wet'n'Wild Toronto — at Steeles Avenue
- Malton
- Indian Line Campground — near Highway 427
- Humber College Main Campus — near Highway 27
- Etobicoke General Hospital
- Rexdale
- The Albion Centre — at Albion Road and Kipling Avenue
- Thistletown
- York-Finch Hospital — Humber River Regional
- Jane Finch Mall — near Jane Street
- Jane and Finch
- Yorkgate Mall — near Jane Street
- Norfinch Mall — near Jane Street
- Finch West station — at Keele Street
- G. Ross Lord Dam and Reservoir, on the Don River (Western Branch), at Dufferin Street
- North York Branson Hospital, near Bathurst Street
- Herb Carnegie North York Centennial Recreation Complex (opposite Branson)
- Esther Shiner Stadium, behind Northview Heights SS at Bathurst
- Finch station and Finch Bus Terminal — at Yonge Street.
- Finch Parkette — site of John Finch's Hotel and tavern in 1848; demolished in 1873
- Historic Zion Schoolhouse near Leslie Street
- Old Cummer GO Station at Leslie Street
- Seneca Polytechnic Newnham Campus at Highway 404
- Bridlewood Mall at Warden Avenue
- Scarborough General Hospital Birchmount Campus (Formerly Scarborough Grace Hospital) at Birchmount Road
- Woodside Square Mall at McCowan Road
- Malvern
- Rouge National Urban Park at the Rouge River
- Toronto Zoo

== Former sections ==
Pawnee Avenue is a former alignment of Finch Avenue. Pawnee Avenue runs along the former North York Township road alignment between Highway 404 and Victoria Park Avenue. Old Finch Avenue (despite its name, there is no "New" Finch) is a separate part of the present road alignment severed from the main section of the street, after a northward arc in its course was partially incorporated into a northerly extension of Morningside Avenue, creating a jog. It runs from Morningside Avenue to east of Sewells Road in northeastern Scarborough, and ends at the western boundary of Rouge National Urban Park.
