= Morningside Park (Toronto) =

Park in Toronto, Ontario

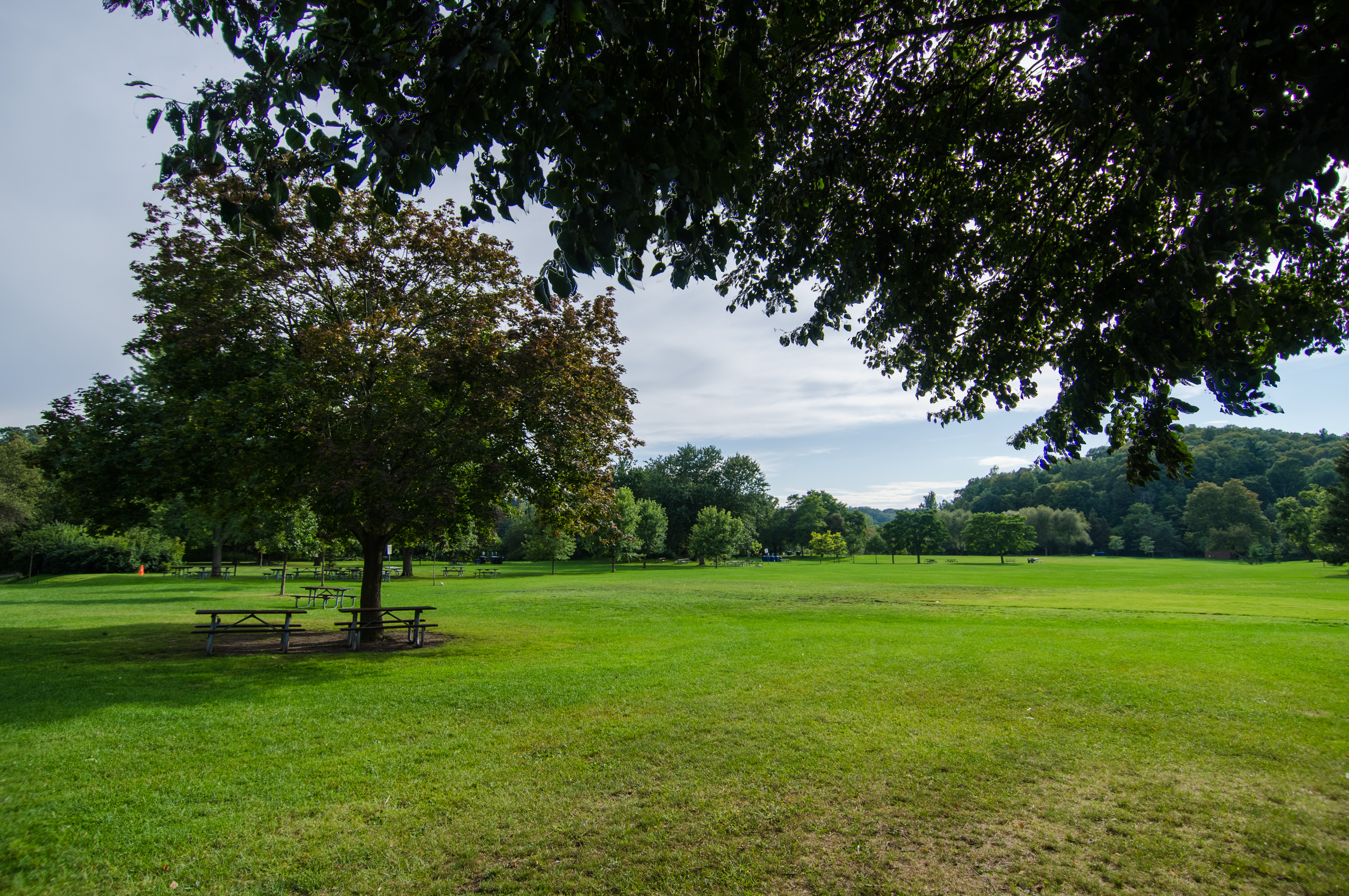

- Location within Toronto
- Type: Urban wild
- Location: Toronto, Ontario, Canada
- Coordinates: 43°46′44″N 79°11′53″W
- Area: 241.46 hectares (596.7 acres)
- Operator: Toronto Parks, Forestry and Recreation Division

Morningside Park is a recreational nature park located in Scarborough, Toronto, Ontario, Canada. It is Toronto's largest municipal park by area.

== Description ==
The park occupies most of the deep valley of Highland Creek where it borders the communities of West Hill and Highland Creek. Spanning 241.46 hectares (596.7 acres), the park includes picnic areas, public washrooms, parking and footpaths which connect to nearby communities and the Waterfront Trail on Lake Ontario. The park is bounded by Morningside Avenue on the east, Ellesmere Road on the north and Lawrence Avenue East to the south. Together with the University of Toronto Scarborough lands east of Morningside Avenue and Colonel Danforth Park, the park is part of a continuous forested corridor along the lower reaches of Highland Creek. The park features a high degree of urban wilderness compared to other parks in Toronto, with deer, eroded cliffs and a remnant forest.

== History ==
The valley of Highland Creek was at one point a settlement. After World War II, a shortage in housing resulted in many new residences being built from cottages. However, an increase in settlers was becoming problematic as contaminated wells, evictions, and home demolition were contentious issues in the post-war period. Living conditions were further complicated by the steep slopes and flat floodplain of the Highland Creek further in the area as residents and their cottages were regularly threatened by flash flooding. In 1954, severe damage from Hurricane Hazel led to the removal of housing in the area. Public ownership of floodplain land was established to prevent further development. The area eventually turned into parklands and wildlife was restored.

Over 5,000 White Pine trees were planted in Morningside Park by the Boy Scouts of Canada in 1994.
