= 2017 Scarborough—Agincourt federal by-election =

- December 11, 2017

Seat of Scarborough—Agincourt
- Turnout: 26.74% (▼32.68pp)
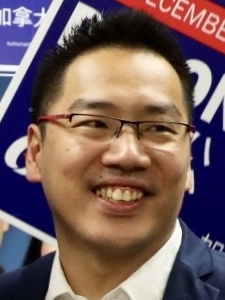
| | First party | Second party | Third party |
|---|---|---|---|
| | LPC | | NDP |
| Candidate | Jean Yip | Dasong Zou | Brian Chang |
| Party | Liberal | Conservative | New Democratic |
| Popular vote | 9,091 | 7,448 | 931 |
| Percentage | 49.44% | 40.51% | 5.06% |
| Swing | ▼2.50pp | ▲2.48pp | ▼2.79pp |
MP before election
Arnold Chan
Liberal
Elected MP
Jean Yip
Liberal

A by-election was held in the federal riding of Scarborough—Agincourt in the Greater Toronto Area of Ontario on December 11, 2017 following the death of Liberal MP Arnold Chan. The seat was held for the Liberals by Jean Yip.

The by election was held on the same day as 3 others across Canada; Battlefords—Lloydminster in Alberta, Bonavista—Burin—Trinity in Newfoundland and Labrador and South Surrey—White Rock in British Columbia.

== Background ==
=== Constituency ===
The riding covers the northwest of the Scarborough part of Toronto. It contains the neighbourhoods of Steeles, L'Amoreaux, Tam O'Shanter-Sullivan, Agincourt and Milliken. Immigrants make up 67.8% of the population of Scarborough—Agincourt, the highest such percentage for any Canadian federal riding; those from Asia and the Middle East alone, constitute a majority of the population (53.0%), which is also the highest figure for any federal riding, and, in particular, immigrants from the People's Republic of China are almost a quarter (24.7%) of the riding's population, another Canadian high. Chinese, not otherwise specified (i.e. Cantonese, Mandarin, etc.) is the home language for 12.0% of the people in Scarborough—Agincourt (another demographic record).

=== Representation ===
The riding of Scarborough—Agincourt has been held by the Liberals since it was first created for the 1988 federal election with Jim Karygiannis serving as its MP until his retirement in 2014.

Liberal Arnold Chan was first elected in a 2014 by-election and was re-elected in the 2015 general election with 51.9% of the vote. Chan died from nasopharyngeal cancer on September 14, 2017.

== Campaign ==
Jean Yip, Chan's widow, defeated Gordon Lam for the Liberal nomination on November 12. Ward 39 Scarborough Agincourt – North city councillor and former Scarborough—Agincourt MP Jim Karygiannis declined to run for the nomination, but threw his support to Yip.

Investment banker Dasong Zou defeated the riding's Conservative candidate in the 2008 federal election, physician Benson Lau for the Conservative nomination. York Region District School Board Trustee Allan Tam as well as former teacher and immigration officer Sarah Chung were both rejected by the party. Tam did not apply before the deadline and Chung was disqualified on two different occasions.

Scarborough-born federal NDP leader and former GTA MPP Jagmeet Singh, who did not have a seat in the House of Commons, ruled out standing as a candidate in the by-election. On November 19, reporter Brian Chang was acclaimed as the NDP candidate.

Rumoured candidates for the Liberal nomination who ultimately did not run included Liberal Scarborough Centre MPP Brad Duguid, Toronto City Council staffer Nick Mantas, Ontario Progressive Conservative staffer Hratch Aynedijan, Ward 36 (Scarborough Southwest – South) city councillor and former provincial Progressive Conservative candidate Gary Crawford, and Liberal Scarborough—Agincourt MPP Soo Wong.

The Speaker's warrant regarding the vacancy was received on September 19, 2017; under the Parliament of Canada Act the writ for a by-election had to be dropped no later than March 18, 2018, 180 days after the Chief Electoral Officer was officially notified of the vacancy via a warrant issued by the Speaker.

== Results ==
The seat was held by the Liberals, with a slight swing to the Conservatives.

Canadian federal by-election, December 11, 2017: Scarborough—Agincourt Death of Arnold Chan
| Party | Candidate | Votes | % | ±% |
|---|---|---|---|---|
| Liberal | Jean Yip | 9,091 | 49.44 | −2.50 |
| Conservative | Dasong Zou | 7,448 | 40.51 | +2.48 |
| New Democratic | Brian Chang | 931 | 5.06 | −2.79 |
| Christian Heritage | Jude Coutinho | 371 | 2.02 | +1.21 |
| Green | Michael DiPasquale | 253 | 1.38 | +0.00 |
| Independent | Tom Zhu | 148 | 0.80 | |
| Independent | John Turmel | 145 | 0.79 | |
| Total valid votes/Expense limit | | 18,387 | 100.00 | |
| Total rejected ballots | | | | |
| Turnout | | 18,387 | 26.74 | −32.68 |
| Eligible voters | | 68,775 | | |
| Liberal hold | | Swing | | −2.49 |

== 2015 result ==
2015 Canadian federal election: Scarborough—Agincourt
| Party | Candidate | Votes | % | ±% | Expenditures |
|---|---|---|---|---|---|
| Liberal | Arnold Chan | 21,587 | 51.95 | +6.38 | $70,985.90 |
| Conservative | Bin Chang | 15,802 | 38.03 | +3.88 | $81,000.27 |
| New Democratic | Laura Thomas Patrick | 3,263 | 7.85 | -10.14 | $3,832.40 |
| Green | Debra Scott | 570 | 1.37 | -0.92 | – |
| Christian Heritage | Jude Coutinho | 334 | 0.80 | – | $621.16 |
| Total valid votes/expense limit | | 41,556 | 99.41 | | $203,566.74 |
| Total rejected ballots | | 248 | 0.59 | – | |
| Turnout | | 41,804 | 59.42 | – | |
| Eligible voters | | 70,355 | | | |
| Liberal hold | | Swing | | +1.25 | |
Source: Elections Canada

== See also ==
- By-elections to the 42nd Canadian Parliament
