= Tam O'Shanter-Sullivan =

- Neighbourhood
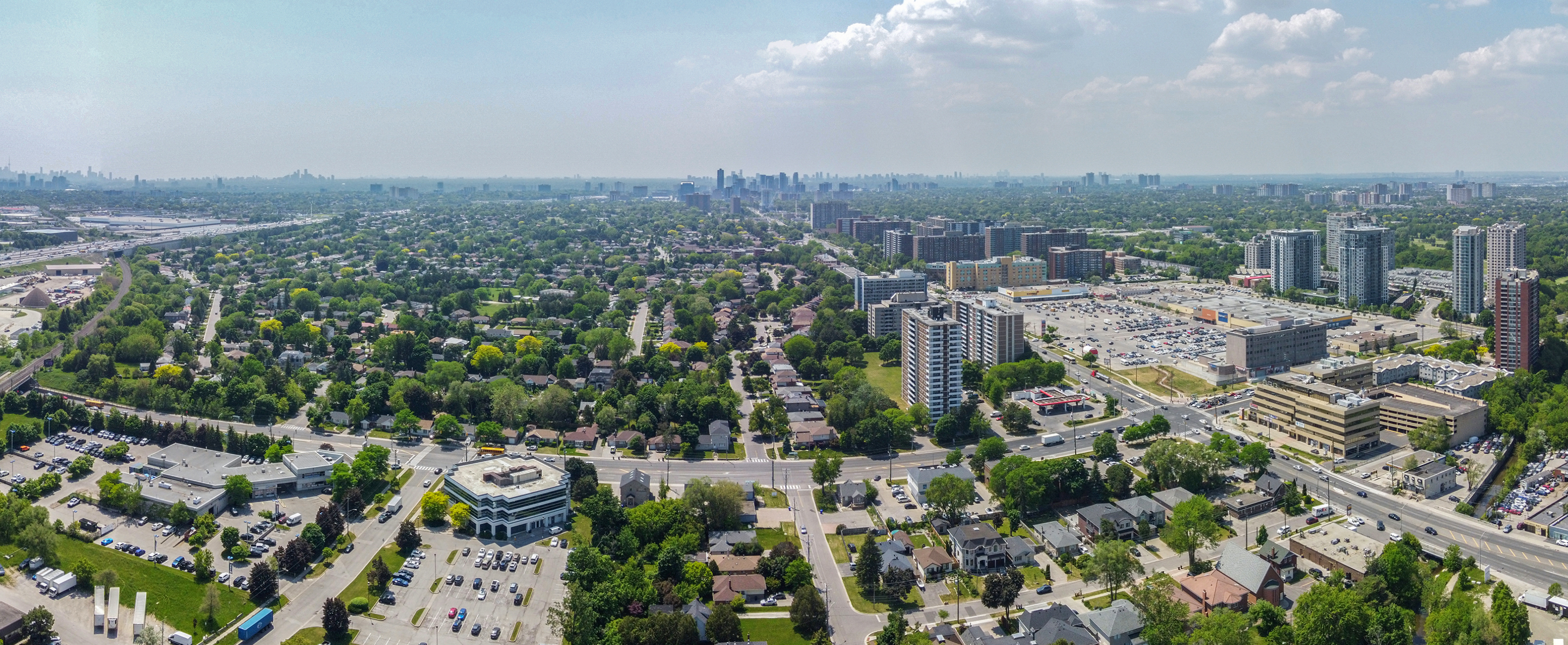
- Aerial view of Tam O'Shanter-Sullivan in 2023

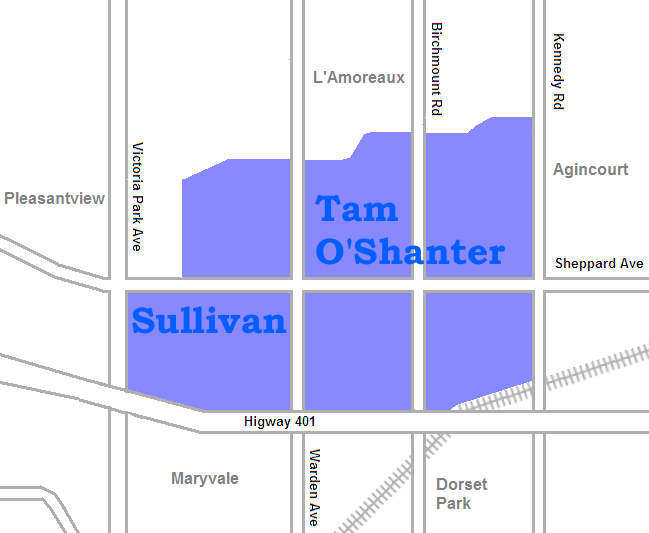
- Sullivan is west of Warden while Tam O'Shanter is east
- Coordinates: 43°47′17″N 79°18′05″W
- Country: Canada
- Province: Ontario
- City: Toronto
- Established: 1850 Scarborough Township
- Changed municipality: 1998 Toronto from City of Scarborough

Government
  - MP: Jean Yip (Scarborough—Agincourt)
  - MPP: Aris Babikian (Scarborough—Agincourt)
  - Councillor: Nick Mantas (Ward 22 Scarborough—Agincourt)

Tam O'Shanter-Sullivan is a neighbourhood in the east end of the city of Toronto, Ontario, Canada, in the district of Scarborough. The neighbourhood is bordered by Huntingwood Drive to the North, Kennedy Road to the East, Highway 401 to the South and Victoria Park (and Pharmacy Ave) to the West. The neighbourhood, which includes the Tam O'Shanter (east of Warden) and Sullivan (west of Warden) communities, takes its name from Tam O’Shanter Golf Course and O'Sullivan's Corners.

The neighbourhood is sometimes included as part of the neighbourhood of Agincourt, which borders Tam O'Shanter to the east. Both regions are part of the electoral district of Scarborough—Agincourt, and the Agincourt Mall is located in Tam O'Shanter.

== History ==
=== Sullivan community ===
O'Sullivan's Corners, located at the corner of Victoria Park and Sheppard Avenues, was named after Patrick O'Sullivan, and consisted of a hotel and a post office, which opened in 1892. The post office was closed in 1912, but reopened in 1956 in the drug store in Wishing Well Plaza at the south-east corner of Pharmacy and Sheppard, as a result of the residential developments in the area. A gas station used to be located here along with a hamburger restaurant, Johnny's Hamburgers, which still stands to this day. A new retail development has been built around Johnny's.

The first subdivision in the neighbourhood, "Town and Country" was bordered by Victoria Park Avenue, Sheppard Avenue, Pharmacy and Ontario Highway 401 (then known as the Toronto By-Pass), or the north part of Lot 35, Concession II, Scarborough Township. The land had been farmed by Thomas Mason. Town and Country was not connected to the sewer system, and the houses all had their own septic systems. The headwaters of Taylor-Massey Creek ran underground through the subdivision, above ground through Wishing Well Park, and under Highway 401. With the widening of the 401, the above-ground portion of the creek was buried and the headwaters were rerouted to Highland Creek.

The next subdivision, "Wishing Well Acres" was east of Pharmacy on the north part of Lots 33 and 34, Concession II, which had been farmed by Christopher Thomson and Ichabod Vradenburg(h) in the 1870s. The neighbourhood school and the street it is on were named after the Vradenburgs, although the spelling of the street name has been inexplicably changed. Wishing Well Acres was the site of the millionth home built in Canada after World War I. Famous residents of the area include Brad Park and Mike Levine of Triumph.

=== Bridlewood community ===
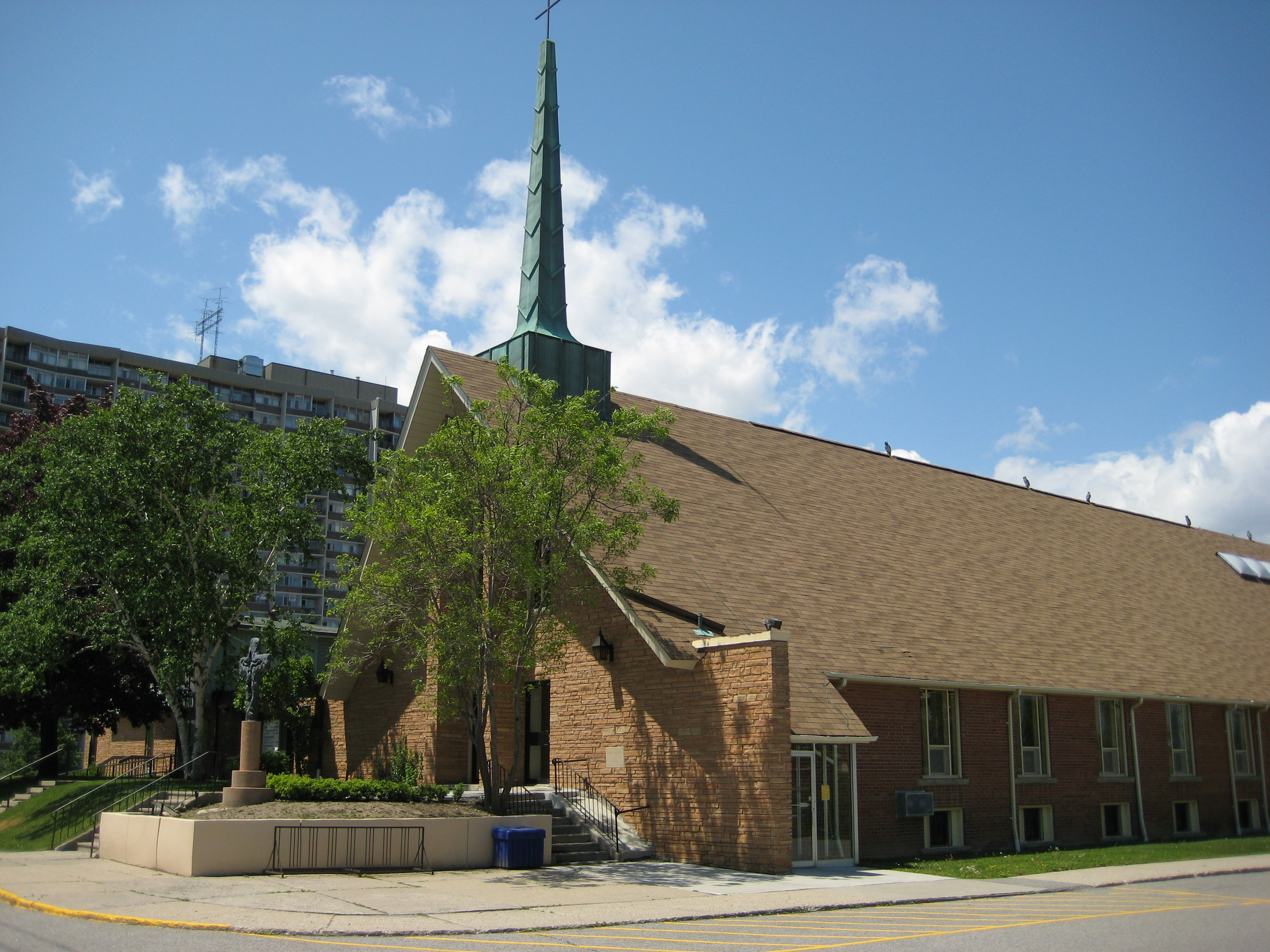
View of the neighbourhood near Holy Spirit Roman Catholic Church

From 1927 to 1946, Harry C. Hatch raised and trained five King's Plate winners on his farm at the northeast corner of Pharmacy and Sheppard, including Monsweep (1936), Goldlure(1937), Budpath(1941), Acara(1944) and Uttermost(1945).

The farm, and others in the area, was purchased by the Robert McClintock Company for residential development of Bridlewood in the 1960s. The development was named "Bridlewood" in honor of Hatch's covered racetrack on the farm. McClintock's company was awarded the Ontario Urban Development Institute Award for the finest development of the year for Bridlewood Phase I in 1964 and Phase II in 1966. Famous residents of Bridlewood include Mike Myers, whose Wayne's World character was inspired by growing up in the area, Eric McCormack (Will & Grace), and David Furnish, who all attended Bridlewood Public School.

Bridlewood Mall is located outside of the community to the northwest in L'Amoreaux.

== Education ==
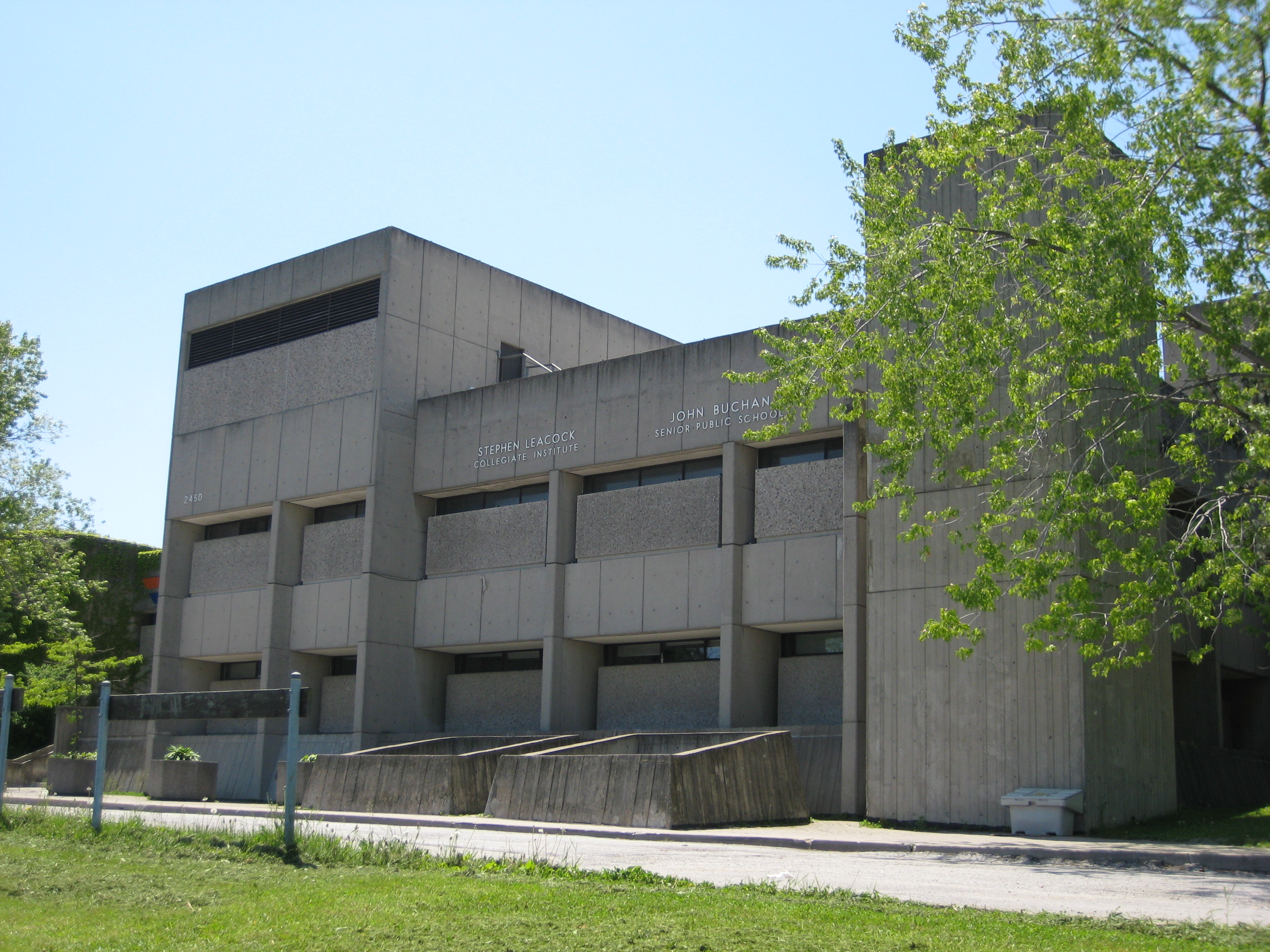
Stephen Leacock Collegiate Institute is a public secondary school located in the neighbourhood.

Two public school boards operate schools in the neighbourhood, the separate Toronto Catholic District School Board (TCDSB), and the secular Toronto District School Board (TDSB).

TCDSB operates one public elementary school, Holy Spirit Catholic School; whereas TDSB operates several schools in the neighbourhood including one public secondary school, Stephen Leacock Collegiate Institute, and several elementary schools. TDSB elementary schools include:

- Bridlewood Junior Public School
- Inglewood Heights Junior Public School
- Lynngate Junior Public School
- John Buchan Senior Public School
- Pauline Johnson Junior Public School
- Tam O'Shanter Junior Public School
- Vradenburg Junior Public School

TCDSB does not operate a secondary school in the neighbourhood, with TCDSB secondary school students residing in the neighbourhood attending institutions in adjacent neighbourhoods. The French-first language public secular school board, Conseil scolaire Viamonde, and it separate counterpart, Conseil scolaire catholique MonAvenir also offer schooling to applicable residents of Morningside, although they do not operate a school in the neighbourhood, with CSCM/CSV students attending schools situated in other neighbourhoods in Toronto.

== Recreation ==
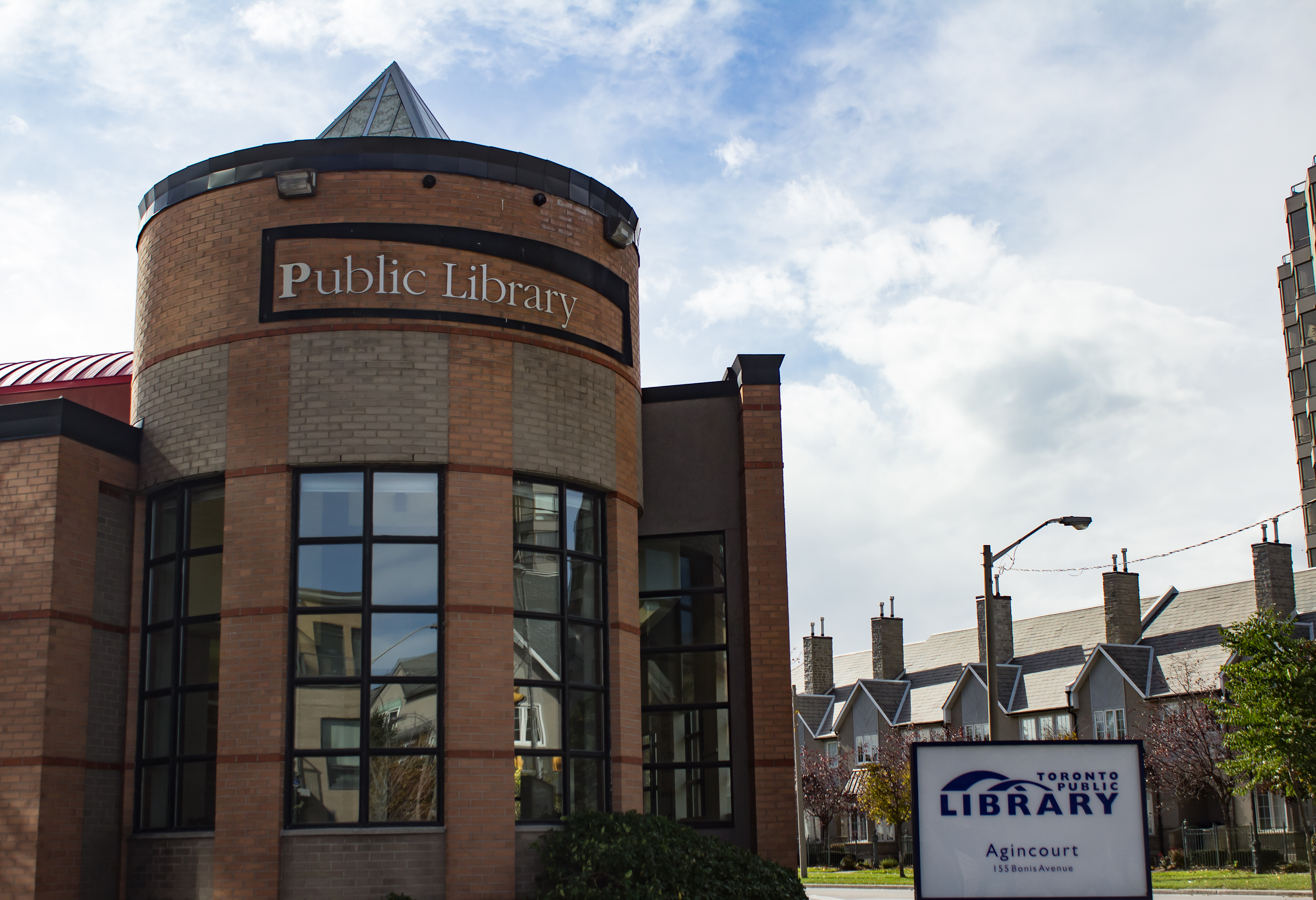
Agincourt branch of the Toronto Public Library is situated in the neighbourhood.

Several parks are situated in the neighbourhood, including Bridlewood Park, Inglewood Heights Park, Ron Watson Park, Vradenburg Park, and Wishing Well Park. Municipal parks in the neighbourhood are managed by the Toronto Parks, Forestry and Recreation Division. The neighbourhood is also home to one branch of the Toronto Public Library, Agincourt branch.
