= Bridlewood Mall =

Shopping mall in Toronto, Ontario, Canada

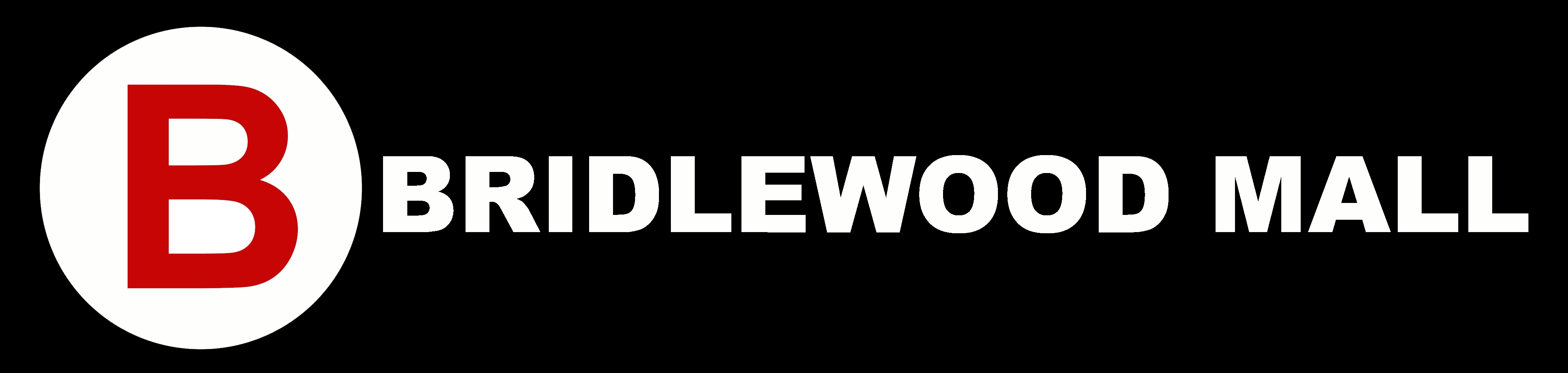

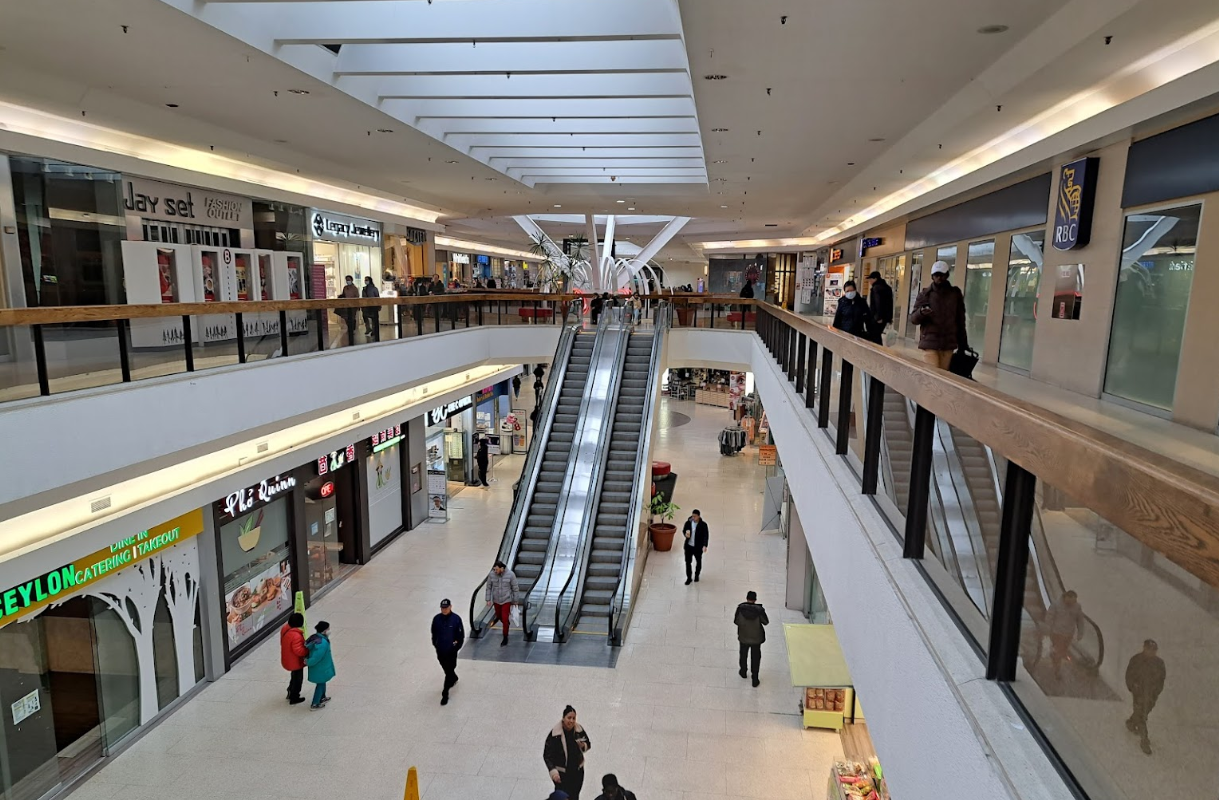
- Bridlewood Mall in March 2023
- Coordinates: 43°47′54″N 79°19′06″W
- Address: 2900 Warden Avenue; Toronto, Ontario; M1W 2S8
- Opened: 1975
- Num. of stores: 81
- Num. of anchor tenants: 3
- Floor area: 35,060 m^{2} (377,400 sq ft)
- Floors: 2
- Public transit: TTC 39/939 TTC 68/968
- Website: www.bridlewoodmall.com

Bridlewood Mall is a neighbourhood shopping centre in Toronto, Ontario, Canada. It serves the L'Amoreaux neighbourhood in the Scarborough district of Toronto. Its anchors include Shoppers Drug Mart, Dollarama, Metro, and Yours Food Mart.

== History ==
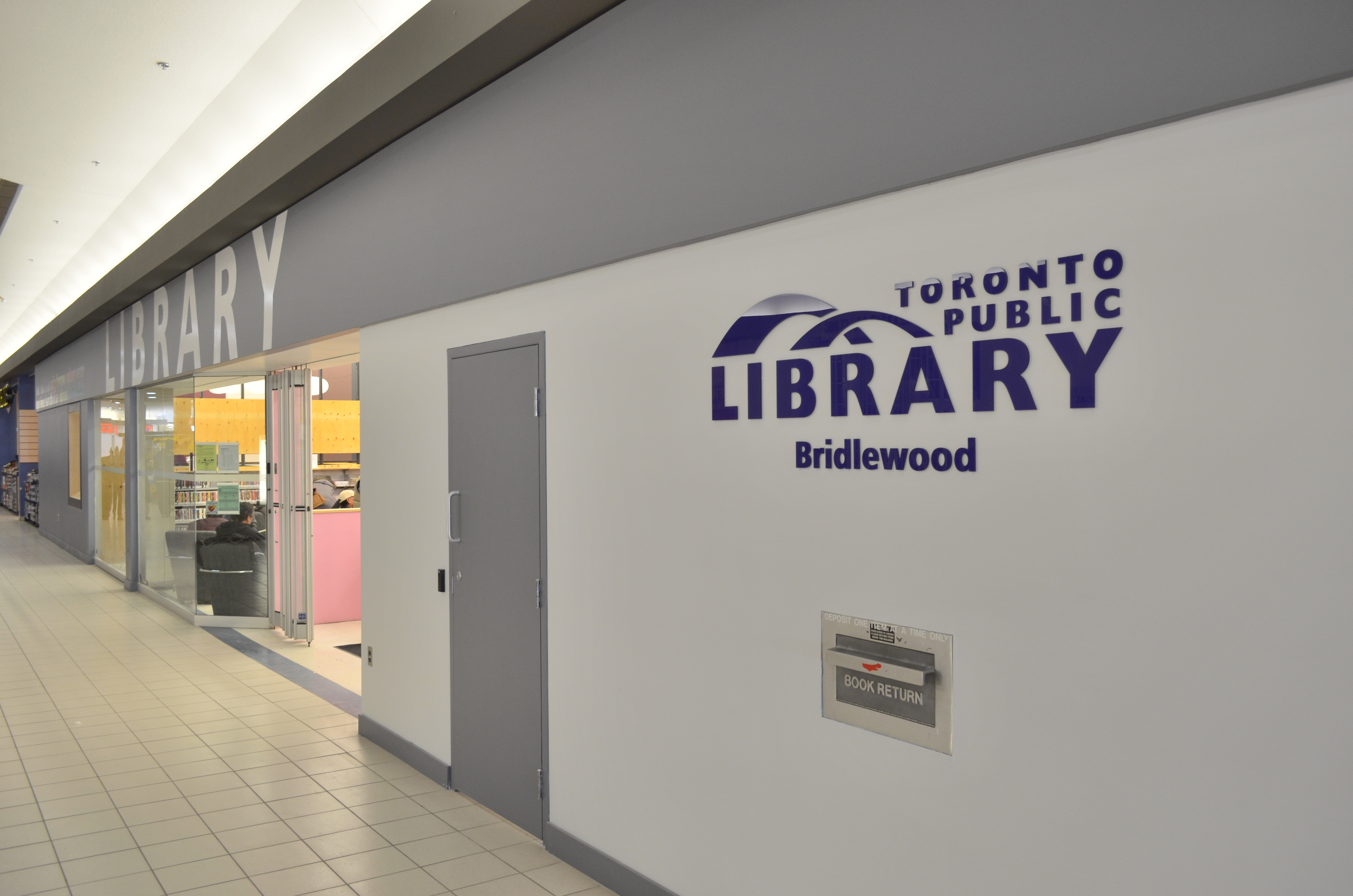
Toronto Public Library's former Bridlewood Branch

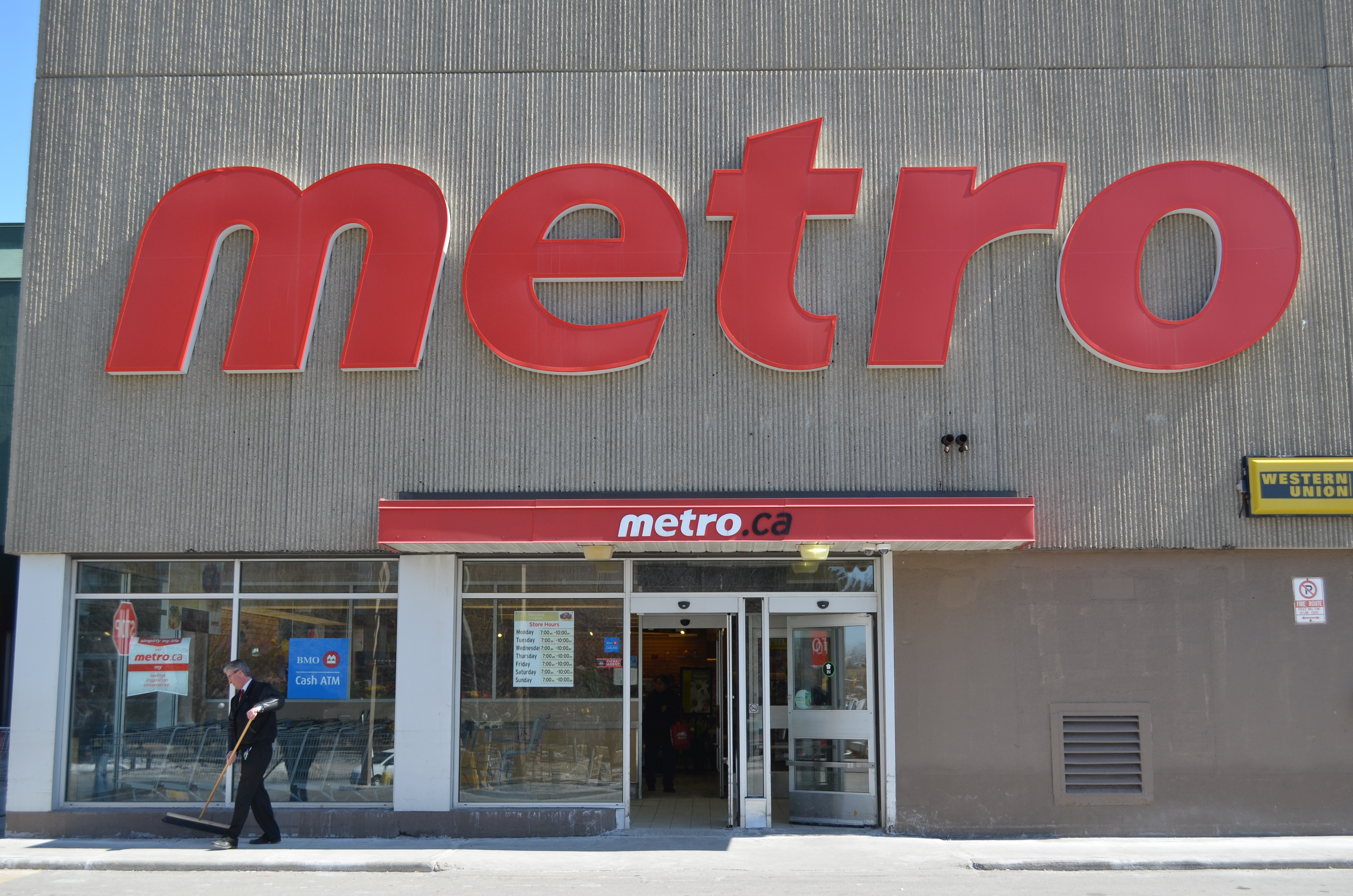
Metro in Bridlewood Mall

Bridlewood Mall was built in 1975 and redeveloped from 1998 to 1999. The mall takes its name from Bridlewood area to the south and the horse farm owned by Harry C. Hatch from 1927 to 1946.

Christie's Methodist Cemetery, established in the 1840s, remains within the mall's parking lot. Approximately 100 people are buried there. When the mall was developed, the cemetery's trustees and relatives of those buried there opposed moving the graves, so the developer incorporated the cemetery into a landscaped area of the parking lot.

The mall began with four big-box store anchors: Towers, Kmart, Food City, and Dominion.

The Towers chain was bought by Zellers in 1990 and the store was closed in 1991.

Metro Inc. bought Dominion stores in December 2008, and the Dominion store was converted into a Metro store.

Zellers went into liquidation on December 26, 2012, and it closed in March 2013.

A Target store was supposed to open at the location where the Zellers store had been (this space is small and it was said that it would be expanded), but all construction activity was cancelled due to Target's departure from Canada in April 2015. The space then became Stitches, a discount clothing outlet in 2016, before its closure in 2019. The space was then reopened on December 22, 2021, as an Asian supermarket (Yours Food Mart), with two smaller stores being leased inside.

Price Chopper closed on December 20, 2020, with the space being split in half. The western half was given to the City of Toronto, where an Employment and Social Services center has opened an office. Meanwhile, the other half has been leased to the Toronto Public Library, where the library has since relocated to that space in 2024 once construction was completed, expanding its area from 7,590 sq ft to approximately 20,000 sq ft.

=== Redevelopment ===
In 2008, the City Planning Division received a rezoning application to permit the redevelopment of the Mall, which would've seen several condos constructed along the north and south sides of the property with the mall being slightly expanded south. In response, the City launched a revitalization study that lasted from 2008-2010 in order to consider mixed-use sites in the area with potential for intensification and revitalization. The study identified needs and issues, opportunities and challenges for the area. The City approved the redevelopment in 2010 but no construction activity or news has emerged since the approval and the banners advertising the redevelopment were quietly removed.

== Retail mix ==
The mall is a mix of small independent businesses, chain stores, a public library, a factory outlet and two grocery stores. The mall has a number of fast food restaurant locations.
