= L'Amoreaux Collegiate Institute =

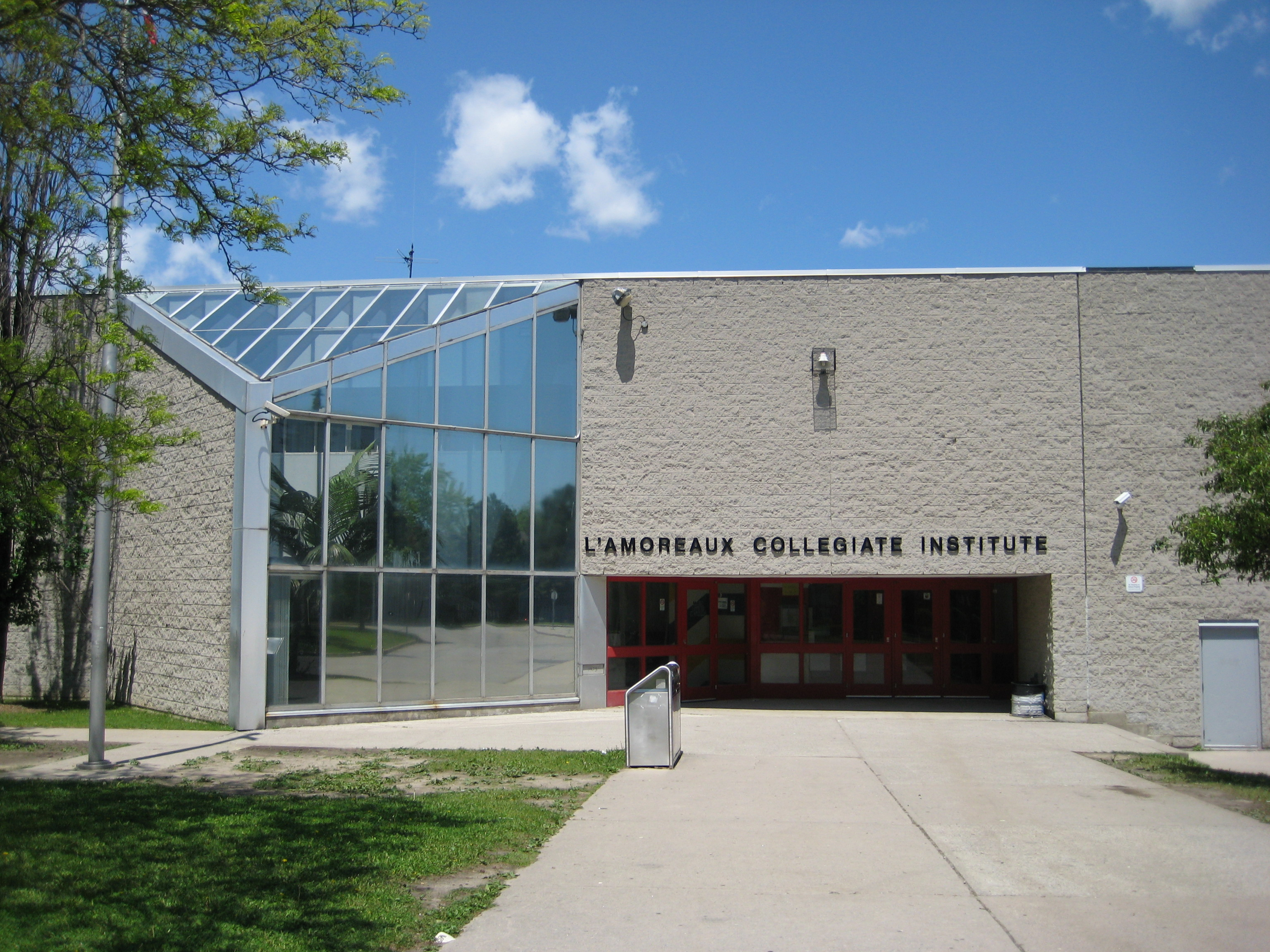

Location
- 2501 Bridletowne Circle; Toronto, Ontario, M1W 2K1; Canada; 43°48′6.93″N 79°19′4.31″W

Information
- School type: Public high school
- Motto: Freedom with Responsibility
- Founded: 1973
- School board: Toronto District School Board (Scarborough Board of Education)
- Superintendent: Mark Sprack
- Area trustee: Manna Wong
- School number: 4226 / 920576
- Administrator: Johnson Lo
- Principal: Charu Khurana
- Grades: 9-12
- Enrolment: 450 (2021-2022)
- Language: English
- Houses: Incendium, Pelagus, Zephyrus and Telluris
- Colours: Royal blue and gold
- Mascot: St. Bernard
- Team name: L'Amoreaux Saints
- Website: schoolweb.tdsb.on.ca/lamoreaux/

L'Amoreaux Collegiate Institute (AKA L'Am) is a public high school in Toronto, Ontario, Canada founded in 1973. It is located in the L'Amoreaux neighbourhood of the former suburb of Scarborough. Originally part of the Scarborough Board of Education, it is now consolidated into the Toronto District School Board. In 2024–2025, the school had an enrolment of 455 and a capacity of 957. 55% of the student body have a first language other than English vs. the provincial average of 26% and 20% are new to Canada from a non-English speaking country vs. the provincial average of 9% The motto of the school is "Freedom with Responsibility".

== History ==
The ultimate origins of L'Amoreaux Collegiate date back to 1868 when S.S. No. 1 opened what later became L'Amoreaux Public School. Located in the northwestern L'Amoreaux neighbourhood, S.S. No. 1 was on the northeastern corner of Finch and Birchmount. It was demolished in 1970 to eliminate an intersection jog. The date stone is now in the foyer of Silver Springs Public School. As population and demographics changed, an area collegiate high school was proposed.

L'Amoreaux C.I., designed by noted Canadian architect Raymond Moriyama, was constructed in 1971 and opened on 4 September 1973 on Bridletowne Circle, just northeast of Warden and Finch, as Scarborough's sixteenth collegiate and twenty-first high school. Its distinctive architecture, which has been described as postmodern, and interior design, includes a large, tiered Central Market Square later named after Rollit J Goldring, (the first principal of the school) instead of standard auditoriums found in similar-sized facilities. The interior makes use of Moriyama's trademark angular concrete designs and hallways accented with bold colours to define distinct 'neighbourhoods'. The school hallway appeared in the rock band Rush's 1982 video for the single "Subdivisions" and has become a point of pride among alumni.

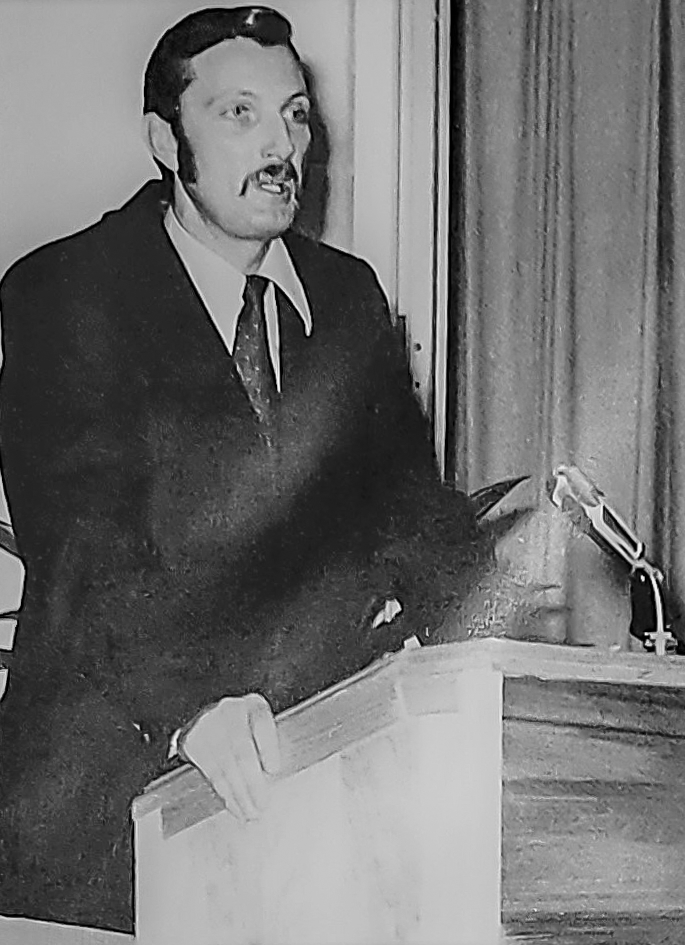
R.J. Goldring delivering the Principal's Message 1974-75

== Overview ==
=== Campus ===
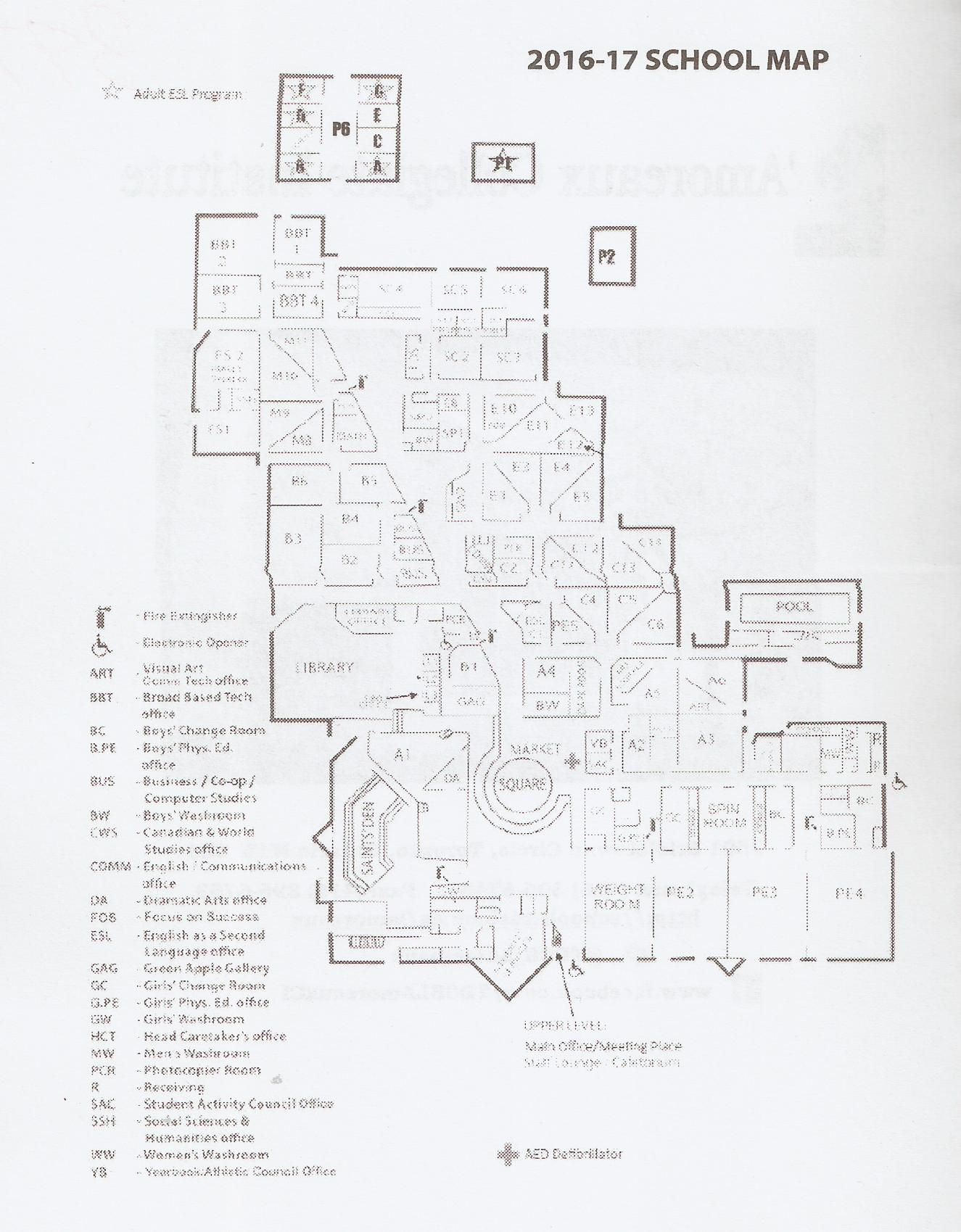
Map of the internal layout of the building

L'Amoreaux Collegiate is 161,512 square feet (15,005.0 m^{2}) and sits on a 15 acres (6.1 ha) parcel. It is a one-story school with administrative offices on a smaller second floor near the building's south end. There are approximately 24 classrooms, six science labs, three art rooms, three music rooms, five computer laboratories (including a communications technology lab), and four vocational shops for technical design and construction. Other features include the Rollit J. Goldring Market Square and a cafetorium with a stage for dramatic productions. Sport facilities include four gymnasia (some of which can be subdivided), a 25m swimming pool shared with the city, and a 400m standard track with a football/soccer field. There are two small portables and one large portapak (Adult ESL Center). The hallways and lockers feature accent colours of red, yellow, green, and blue transitioning from the front to the back of the school.

=== Houses ===
- From the 2017–2018 school year, students are randomly assigned to one of four houses: Incendium, Pelagus, Telluris, and Zephyrus (Latin for the four elements). Siblings are grouped in the same house to avoid rivalry.
- The original house system comprised Edwards, Kennedy, Purcell, Tomlinson, Scadding, and White—with yearbooks organized accordingly. At least five of the original houses were named after prominent local ministers, teachers, land donors, and farmers, according to Carol Tennant in L'Amoreaux Life.

=== Courses ===
- Specialist High Skills Major Programs
  - L'Amoreaux offers three SHSM programs, as well as programs in Business and Finance, Information and Communication Technology, and Health and Wellness. Students enrolled in SHSM receive an extra diploma seal.
- Extended French and Spanish
  - An Honors Extended French Program is offered, allowing students to graduate with a certificate of bilingualism; Spanish classes are also available.
- Robotics Engineering
  - The school is one of the few that offers both a robotics course and club. The course covers engineering principles, robot systems, programming, and the societal impact of robotics. It is project-based, with assignments including the construction of two VEX EDR Robots for the worldwide VEX Robotics Competition. Students also contribute to building a FIRST Robotics Competition robot.

== Extra-curricular ==
=== Sports ===
- Girls’ sports include badminton, basketball, field hockey, football (soccer), and volleyball.
- Boys’ sports include basketball, football (soccer), and volleyball.
- Mixed sports include cricket, cross country, dragon boating, swimming, and volleyball.

=== Clubs ===
Clubs at L’Amoreaux include: Athletic Council, Black Student Alliance, Boyz II Men, Chess Club, Christian Fellowship, Debate Club, Drama, Equity and Student Advocacy, Formal Committee, Girl Talk, L’Amoreaux Pride LGBT+, L’Amoreaux Prefects (formerly PALS), LESS, Model United Nations, Muslim Student Association, Tamil Student Association, Radio L’Am, Robotics, School Action Team, Student Activity Council, United Cultures @ L’Am, and Yearbook.

== Notable alumni ==
- Charlie Angus – author, journalist, broadcaster, musician, and politician; formed the band L'Etranger while at L'Am.
- John Anderson (ice hockey) – former NHL player with the Toronto Maple Leafs, Hartford Whalers, and Quebec Nordiques; later an IHL, AHL, and NHL coach.
- Joel Brough – field hockey player (World University Games 1991, Summer Olympics Barcelona 1992, Pan American Games 1995, and two world championships).
- Paul Humphrey (Canadian musician) – Canadian singer-songwriter and lead singer for the 1980s Canadian New Wave band Blue Peter.
- Dan Gallagher – Canadian broadcaster, DJ/VJ, and co-founder of Radio L'Am.
- Tracy Lamourie – activist and celebrity publicist.
- Sandra Levy – Olympic field hockey player (1988, 1992), sports ambassador, and recipient of the African Canadian Achievement Award of Excellence.
- Alvin Leung – "Demon Chef" on MasterChef Canada TV show.
- Maestro Fresh Wes – hip hop artist and producer.
- Behn Wilson – former NHL defenseman for nine seasons with the Chicago Black Hawks and Philadelphia Flyers.
- Ellen Wong – actor.

== See also ==
- Education in Ontario
- List of secondary schools in Ontario
