= Arnold Chan =

Canadian lawyer and politician (1967–2017)

Arnold Chan MP
- 陳家諾
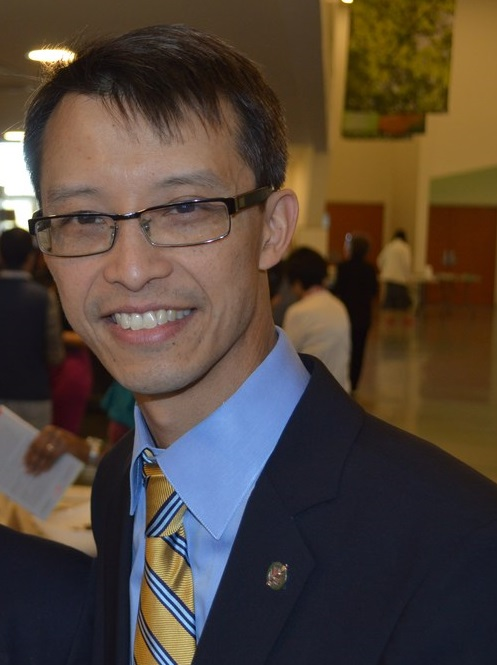
- Chan in 2016

Member of Parliament for Scarborough—Agincourt
- In office June 30, 2014 – September 14, 2017
- Preceded by: Jim Karygiannis
- Succeeded by: Jean Yip

Deputy Leader of the Government in the House of Commons
- In office December 2, 2015 – September 14, 2017
- Prime Minister: Justin Trudeau
- Preceded by: Scott Reid
- Succeeded by: Chris Bittle

Personal details
- Born: June 10, 1967 Scarborough, Ontario, Canada
- Died: September 14, 2017 (aged 50) Toronto, Ontario, Canada
- Cause of death: Nasopharyngeal cancer
- Party: Liberal
- Spouse: Jean Yip
- Children: 3
- Profession: Lawyer; political aide

Arnold Chan (June 10, 1967 – September 14, 2017) was a Canadian lawyer and politician, who was elected to represent the riding of Scarborough—Agincourt in the House of Commons of Canada in the 2014 by-election. Chan was a member of the Liberal Party of Canada.

== Education ==
Arnold attended Henry Kelsey Senior Public School, Sir Ernest MacMillan Senior Public School and Dr Norman Bethune Collegiate Institute, Chan studied at the University of Toronto, earning an undergraduate and two master's degrees in political science and urban planning, before obtaining a law degree from the University of British Columbia.

== Early career ==
Prior to his election, Chan worked as a lawyer and, for a time, for the Ontario government as chief of staff to Ontario cabinet minister Michael Chan and then as senior aide to Ontario Premier Dalton McGuinty.

== Federal politics ==
Chan won the Liberal nomination for Scarborough—Agincourt after incumbent Liberal MP Jim Karygiannis resigned to run for Toronto City Council. He was elected to Parliament with 59 per cent of the vote in a by-election held in 2014.

While in opposition, Chan served as Liberal critic for the Federal Economic Development Initiative for Northern Ontario, and critic for the Federal Economic Development Agency for Southern Ontario. In November 2014, he became critic for Tourism and Small Business.

On January 22, 2015, Chan revealed to the public that he would take a five-week leave of absence while undergoing treatment for nasopharyngeal cancer. Upon his return, he resumed his role and criticized the Harper government's partisan use of public advertising, and their lack of promotion of Canada in the global tourism market.

Following the Liberal victory in the October 2015 federal election, Chan became Deputy Leader of the Government in the House of Commons. Chan was known for his advocacy on behalf of the Armenian Canadian community, and chaired the Canada-Armenia Parliamentary Friendship Group. Chan hosted Garo Paylan, an ethnic-Armenian Member of the Turkish Parliament and advocate for minorities in Turkey, when Paylan visited the Parliament of Canada in May 2017.

In his final speech to the House of Commons on June 12, 2017, Chan urged fellow MPs to rise above partisanship and improve the level of debate in Parliament, saying "I am not sure how many more times I will have the strength to get up and do a 20-minute speech in this place, but the point I want to impart to all of us is that I know we are all honourable members, I know members revere this place, and I would beg us to not only act as honourable members but to treat this institution honourably," adding "I would ask all of us to elevate our debate, to elevate our practice."

== Personal life ==
Chan was diagnosed with nasopharyngeal cancer in 2014. After going into remission following treatment in 2015, the disease recurred in 2016. Chan died on September 14, 2017, at the age of 50.

Chan had three sons with his wife Jean Yip. Yip won a December 11, 2017 by-election for Chan's former seat.

Chan was the older brother of physician Kevin Chan.

== Electoral record ==
2015 Canadian federal election: Scarborough—Agincourt
Party	Candidate	Votes	%	±%	Expenditures
Liberal	Arnold Chan	21,587	51.95	+6.38	$70,985.90
Conservative	Bin Chang	15,802	38.03	+3.88	$81,000.27
New Democratic	Laura Thomas Patrick	3,263	7.85	-10.14	$3,832.40
Green	Debra Scott	570	1.37	-0.92	–
Christian Heritage	Jude Coutinho	334	0.80	–	$621.16
Total valid votes/expense limit		41,556	99.41		$203,566.74
Total rejected ballots		248	0.59	–	
Turnout		41,804	59.42	–	
Eligible voters		70,355			
Liberal hold		Swing		+1.25	
Source: Elections Canada

Canadian federal by-election, June 30, 2014: Scarborough—Agincourt Resignation of Jim Karygiannis
Party	Candidate	Votes	%	±%
Liberal	Arnold Chan	12,868	59.38	+13.98
Conservative	Trevor Ellis	6,344	29.27	−4.91
New Democratic	Elizabeth Ying Long	1,838	8.48	−9.62
Independent	Kevin Clarke	315	1.45	-
Green	Shahbaz Mir	307	1.42	−0.90
Total valid votes/expense limit		21,672	99.44	–
Total rejected ballots		121	0.56	−0.09
Turnout		21,793	29.43	−26.60
Eligible voters		74,062		
Liberal hold		Swing		+9.45
Source: Elections Canada
