= Sir Ernest MacMillan Senior Public School =

Location
- 149 Huntsmill Boulevard; Scarborough, Toronto, Ontario, M1W 2Y2; Canada
- Coordinates: 43.8062°N 79.3289°W

Information
- School board: Toronto District School Board
- Superintendent: Courtney Lewis
- Area trustee: Manna Wong
- Administrator: Christina Sgandurra
- Principal: Ryan Gibson
- Grades: 7 and 8
- Age range: 11-14
- Average class size: 20-32
- Classrooms: 7A, 7B, 7C, 7D, 7E, 7F, 7G, 8A, 8B, 8C, 8D, 8E, 8F, 8G, 7/8HS (as of the 2014-2015 school year)
- Colors: Red and Yellow
- Sports: Volleyball, Basketball, Floor Hockey, Soccer, Softball, Yoga, Cross Country
- Mascot: Firebird
- Nickname: "Mac"
- Team name: Firebirds
- Website: schoolweb.tdsb.on.ca/semacmillan/Home.aspx

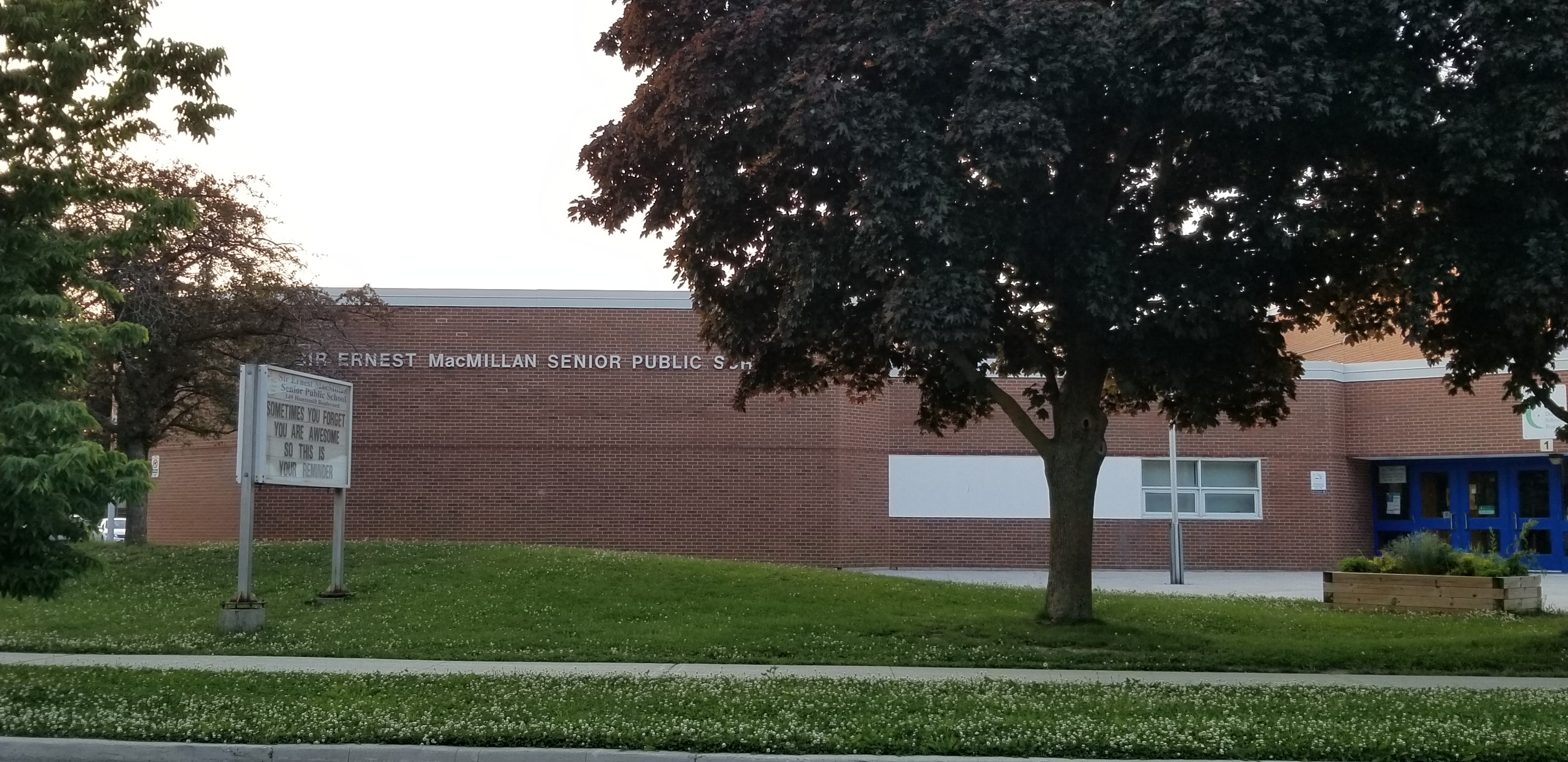

Sir Ernest MacMillan Senior Public School is a seventh- and eighth-grade school in the Scarborough area of Toronto. A triple-track school, it offers programs in Standard English (with Core French), Extended French, and French Immersion.

The school is named for Canada's only "Musical Knight".

== Notable alumni ==
- Arnold Chan, politician
