= Jim Karygiannis =

Canadian politician

The Honourable Jim Karygiannis PC
- Δημήτρης Καρύγιαννης

Toronto City Councillor for Ward 22 Scarborough—Agincourt
- In office August 5, 2020 – September 24, 2020
- Preceded by: Vacant
- Succeeded by: Nick Mantas
- In office November 25, 2019 – June 24, 2020
- Preceded by: Vacant
- Succeeded by: Vacant
- In office December 1, 2018 – November 6, 2019
- Preceded by: Ward established
- Succeeded by: Vacant

Toronto City Councillor for (Ward 39) Scarborough—Agincourt
- In office December 1, 2014 – December 1, 2018
- Preceded by: Mike Del Grande
- Succeeded by: Ward abolished

Member of the Canadian Parliament for Scarborough—Agincourt
- In office November 21, 1988 – April 1, 2014
- Preceded by: Paul McCrossan
- Succeeded by: Arnold Chan

Personal details
- Born: James Karygiannis; May 2, 1955 (age 71) Athens, Greece
- Party: Liberal
- Spouse: Toula Karygiannis
- Education: University of Toronto (BASc)
- Profession: Businessman, industrial engineer

James Karygiannis PC (/ˌkærɪdʒiˈænɪs/ KARR-ij-ee-AN-iss; Greek: Δημήτρης Καρύγιαννης, romanized: Dimítris Karýgiannis, IPA: [ðiˈmitris kaˈriʝanis]; born May 2, 1955) is a former Canadian politician. He served in the House of Commons of Canada as a Liberal MP from 1988 to 2014, and as member of the Toronto City Council from 2014 until 2020, when his seat was vacated due to campaign spending violations.

Karygiannis served concurrently as the parliamentary secretary to the Minister of Human Resources and Skills Development and Minister responsible for Democratic Renewal (2005) and was previously parliamentary secretary to the Minister of Transport (2003–2005).

In opposition, Karygiannis attracted substantive attention from the media and various ethnic community groups as he took polemical stances on foreign policy issues and as part of his role as multiculturalism critic.

On April 1, 2014, he resigned his seat as a Member of Parliament in order to stand in the Toronto municipal election for Toronto City Councillor in Ward 39, and subsequently was elected to that seat. In November 2019, Karygiannis was removed from office for exceeding election expenses in the 2018 municipal election. He was then reinstated and removed twice during the ensuing legal saga that resulted in his final removal from office on September 24, 2020.

== Personal life ==
Karygiannis was born in Athens, Greece. Before entering politics, Karygiannis was a businessman and industrial engineer. He immigrated to Canada in 1966, and has a Bachelor of Applied Science degree in Industrial Engineering from the University of Toronto. He also holds a degree of Fellowship of Business Administration from the Canadian School of Management. He is married with five daughters.

== Politics ==
Karygiannis has been involved with politics as a Liberal since the late 1980s, first in provincial politics and later as a federal MP. He ran as a candidate of the Ontario Liberal Party for the Legislative Assembly of Ontario in the 1987 provincial election. He lost to David Reville of the Ontario New Democratic Party by about 1,500 votes. He was elected to the Canadian House of Commons the following year in the federal election, defeating Progressive Conservative incumbent W. Paul McCrossan by 858 votes in the newly created riding of Scarborough—Agincourt.

Karygiannis was one of the more socially conservative members of the Liberal caucus, and is opposed to abortion and same-sex marriage. In June 2005, however, he strongly criticized other socially-conservative Liberals who had threatened to bring down the government on the marriage issue.

=== In government ===
He won a landslide re-election in the 1993 federal election as the Liberals won a majority government, and was easily re-elected in subsequent federal elections.

Karygiannis was a prominent Toronto organizer for Jean Chrétien in the Liberal Party's 1990 leadership contest, and was credited with delivering considerable support to Chrétien from the city's Greek community.

In 2002, Karygiannis was voted "laziest MP" in a poll of Parliamentary staffers by The Hill Times.

Known as a Chrétien loyalist throughout the 1990s, Karygiannis announced in 2002 that he would support Paul Martin in the next Liberal leadership contest. In making his decision, he told an interviewer that it was time for Chrétien to retire "with dignity", rather than risk a potentially divisive leadership review. When Martin became Liberal party leader on December 12, 2003, he appointed Karygiannis as parliamentary secretary to the Minister of Transport.

In April 2004, Karygiannis brought forward a private member's motion which recognized the death of 1.5 million Armenians between 1915 and 1923 as a genocide. The motion was approved by parliament 153 to 68, with support among Liberal backbench and opposition MPs, though Prime Minister Martin and his cabinet did not show up for the free vote and insisted that the motion is non-binding. Foreign Minister Bill Graham has defended the government's position that the event constituted a "tragedy" rather than the purposeful extermination of minority Armenians. In response to Martin's assertion that foreign policy rests with the cabinet, Karygiannis said that a clear majority of Parliament saw it differently and urged Martin to live up to his promise to give MPs real clout. The Turkish government was strongly critical of the motion and argued that Canadian MPs were rewriting history, while the Turkish Embassy suggested that relations between the two countries would be harmed as a result. Local press has also described his genocide recognition cause as one that "splits cultural communities".

Karygiannis played a prominent role in organizing Toronto-area support for victims of the December 2004 earthquake in Southeast Asia. He called for cooperation between the city's Tamil and Sinhalese communities for the relief effort in Sri Lanka, and personally travelled to Sri Lanka to witness the tsunami devastation firsthand. He was later criticized by fellow Member of Parliament David Kilgour for traveling to an area of Sri Lanka dominated by the Liberation Tigers of Tamil Eelam (Tamil Tigers), as the faction was proscribed as a terrorist organisation by many countries. Karygiannis defended his decision, saying that his intent was to confirm that disaster aid was reaching the region. Despite Kilgour's concerns, Karygiannis's travels did not provoke a diplomatic incident with Sri Lanka.

In March 2005, Karygiannis travelled to Guyana to witness the damage that recent floods had done in the country. He helped to secure CIDA aid for Guyana of over CA$2.7 million Canadian.

When Hurricane Katrina devastated New Orleans in September 2005, Karygiannis was one of the first Canadian parliamentarians to organize a Canadian relief effort.

=== In opposition ===
Karygiannis was the National Chairman for MP Joe Volpe's campaign to lead the Liberal Party of Canada, but he resigned on July 21, 2006, over disagreements with Volpe's pro-Israeli stance on the conflict in Lebanon.

On July 26, 2006, Karygiannis said that he was considering a run for the Liberal leadership himself because he felt the other candidates were "lacking" on the issue of foreign policy. At the leadership convention, he supported Bob Rae, but then threw his support to Stéphane Dion when Rae was eliminated from the ballot.

In September 2007, the Canadian government announced that it would recognize the country Macedonia as the "Republic of Macedonia" rather than by its previous designation as the "Former Yugoslav Republic of Macedonia." This decision was criticized by the government of Greece, which claims the name Macedonia as its own. Karygiannis also opposed the government's decision and indicated that the Greek-Canadian community would mobilize against it.

In February 2009, Immigration Minister Jason Kenney announced that he would review and possibly reduce or eliminate federal funding to the Canadian Arab Federation (CAF) after its president criticized Kenney's pro-Israel position in the 2008-2009 Israel-Gaza conflict. Karygiannis subsequently asked the parliamentary ethics commissioner, Mary Dawson, to investigate whether Kenney was abusing his position.

During his term of services in the 40th Parliament between November 2008 and December 2010, Karygiannis voted 171 times out of a possible 311 possible votes. The Globe and Mail ranked him third in the list of politicians that missed votes.

On February 22, 2011, Jim Karygiannis joined a protest rally of the Armenian Youth Federation by the Embassy of Azerbaijan in Ottawa timed to the anniversary of the Nagorno-Karabakh separatist movement in Azerbaijan. During his four-minute speech, he called for the Azerbaijani ambassador Farid Shafiyev to be stripped of his diplomatic privileges and leave Canada. Shafiyev reacted by saying Karygiannis had "crossed the line of civility and decency and used the language of the level of street hooliganism." Later another Liberal multiculturalism critic Rob Oliphant in a telephone call to Shafiyev expressed his regret about his colleague's statement and added that Karygiannis's words did not represent the attitudes of the Liberal Party.

In August 2011, Citizenship and Immigration Committee officers complained of Jim Karygiannis using abusive language and an aggressive tone while speaking to them. Karygiannis stated that the accusations were false and part of a "smear campaign against him."

As a multiculturalism critic, Karygiannis attempted to unite 19 cultural groups in Ottawa on August 27, 2011, to discuss issues they faced. The event was boycotted by the Jewish, Chinese, Turkish, and Macedonian communities. A spokesperson for B'nai Brith Canada said the Liberal Party should consider putting forth a better representative of the party to deal with multiculturalism matters, due to Karygiannis's being "divisive on some issues", instead of bringing communities together. The Council of Turkish Canadians released a statement where it explained its unwillingness to participate in the event by Karygiannis's "past attempts to promote ethnic division and intolerance against Canadians of different national origin", particularly Turks, Azeris and Macedonians.

In mid-August 2011, Karygiannis's former Conservative opponent Harry Tsai, among others, signed a collective letter on behalf of the Taiwanese Canadian Association of Toronto, requesting that Bob Rae remove Karygiannis from his multicultural critic's post. The letter cited his poor attendance of the House of Commons and bad treatment of Canada's Turkish and Macedonian community as reasons to be considered unfit. According to Tsai, Karygiannis contacted him by telephone saying he did not care about what they had written and expressing content that the authors of the letter "had been able to write in English". In his public response, Karygiannis denied making such a comment and complained that the letter was signed in part by "Turks and Macedonians, who don't like it, because I am Greek, and they have problems with Greeks." As for Tsai's discontent, Karygiannis explained it by the Conservative candidate's feelings after having got "his butt kicked" during the election.

In July 2012, Karygiannis travelled to the South Caucasus region of Nagorno-Karabakh, on the invitation of the Armenian National Committee of Canada, to observe its presidential election. The Azerbaijani ambassador to Canada Farid Shafiyev criticized Karygiannis for taking sides in the conflict and "pandering to radical elements within his constituency" in chase of "ethnic votes and disregarding international law." Shafiyev also claimed Karygiannis's entry to Nagorno-Karabakh was "illegal", as he had not obtained a visa or special permission from the Azerbaijani government to travel there, and that his stay on the disputed territory was paid for by the government of Armenia. In response, Karygiannis who had been aware of Azerbaijan's objections to his visit affirmed his decision and offered to be invited to Azerbaijan as an observer for the next election, which Shafiyev turned down as unlikely, saying Karygiannis would be declared persona non grata and denied any future entry in Azerbaijan. On August 1, members of Toronto's Azeri community held a protest in front of the office of the Liberal Party about Karygiannis's visit to Nagorno-Karabakh.

In February 2013, Karygiannis was accused of using his political position to intervene to facilitate the passage of five Greek musicians into Canada. He was reported to have misinformed the authorities about the purpose of their visit, stating they had intended to participate in his father's wake, when in fact they were coming to Canada to perform at a paid concert. Karygiannis did not comment other than confirming that he had intervened in the matter but "did not profit from it".

=== City councillor ===
On December 1, 2014, Karygiannis joined the Toronto city council as the elected councillor for ward 39. He was re-elected in 2018 in the redistricted ward 22.

Karygiannis was appointed to the Toronto licensing and standards committee – which deals with taxi regulations. He is a vocal opponent of Uber, Karygiannis is a lifelong personal friend of Co-Op Cab company CEO Peter Zahakos. Zahakos has made donations to Karygiannis, and is a lobbyist on taxi licensing issues. An examination by The Globe and Mail found that Karygiannis has received at least $7600 in campaign donations in 2014 from people connected to the taxi industry, about 10% of his total fundraising, and further found that Karygiannis had received donations from 12 individuals with the same last name and address, a house owned by an official with Diamond Taxi.

In February 2016, Karygiannis brought up the possibility of banning recording artist Beyoncé from Canada. The Super Bowl 50 halftime entertainer had a routine which paid tribute to the 50th anniversary of the Black Panthers. Karygiannis went public with his interpretation of the routine as "anti-policy" and "pro-gun culture". Karygiannis also said "All lives matter."

In May 2016, Karygiannis put forward a motion to the Toronto City Council to recognize the Pontian Greek genocide. The motion said that "450,000–750,000 Pontian and Anatolian Greeks were executed".

==== Removal from office ====
On November 6, 2019, Karygiannis was removed as a member of City Council for Ward 22 due to misspending on the supplementary financial statement of his 2018 election. The Municipal Elections Act permitted a maximum of 10 per cent of total funds ($6,120.80) to be spent for "parties and other expressions of appreciation" in Ward 22 after election day; Karygiannis exceeded this limit by $25,962.70. Karygiannis argued that the expense was an inadvertent clerical error, which represented a legitimate and legal expense that was simply miscategorized in the wrong line item.

On November 25, Justice William Chalmers of the Ontario Superior Court ruled that Karygiannis's explanation was acceptable and that he could retake office immediately. Karygiannis returned to City Hall and resumed his work as a councillor the next day. On December 2, 2019, Toronto resident Adam Chaleff filed an appeal of the decision.

On June 24, 2020, the Court of Appeal overturned the Superior Court's ruling stating that Karygiannis had "not clearly demonstrated to this court that this was a mere 'clerical error'" and he was removed from office for a second time.

On August 5, 2020, a stay on the decision was granted by the Ontario Court of Appeal while Karygiannis appealed the decision to the Supreme Court of Canada, thereby reinstating him as councillor. The Supreme Court declined to give Karygiannis leave to appeal on September 24, 2020; therefore the Court of Appeal decision was upheld and he was removed from office.

== Controversies ==
On February 22, 2011, Jim Karygiannis joined a protest rally of the Armenian Youth Federation by the Embassy of Azerbaijan in Ottawa timed to the anniversary of the Nagorno-Karabakh separatist movement in Azerbaijan. During his four-minute speech, he called for the Azerbaijani ambassador Farid Shafiyev to be stripped of his diplomatic privileges and leave Canada. Shafiyev reacted by saying Karygiannis had "crossed the line of civility and decency and used the language of the level of street hooliganism." Later another Liberal multiculturalism critic Rob Oliphant in a telephone call to Shafiyev expressed his regret about his colleague's statement and added that Karygiannis's words did not represent the attitudes of the Liberal Party.

In August 2011, Citizenship and Immigration Committee officers complained of Jim Karygiannis using abusive language and an aggressive tone while speaking to them. Karygiannis stated that the accusations were false and part of a "smear campaign against him."

As a multiculturalism critic, Karygiannis attempted to unite 19 cultural groups in Ottawa on August 27, 2011, to discuss issues they faced. The event was boycotted by the Jewish, Chinese, Turkish, and Macedonian communities. A spokesperson for B'nai Brith Canada said the Liberal Party should consider putting forth a better representative of the party to deal with multiculturalism matters, due to Karygiannis's being "divisive on some issues", instead of bringing communities together. The Council of Turkish Canadians released a statement where it explained its unwillingness to participate in the event by Karygiannis's "past attempts to promote ethnic division and intolerance against Canadians of different national origin", particularly Turks, Azeris and Macedonians.

In mid-August 2011, Karygiannis's former Conservative opponent Harry Tsai, among others, signed a collective letter on behalf of the Taiwanese Canadian Association of Toronto, requesting that Bob Rae remove Karygiannis from his multicultural critic's post. The letter cited his poor attendance of the House of Commons and bad treatment of Canada's Turkish and Macedonian community as reasons to be considered unfit. According to Tsai, Karygiannis contacted him by telephone saying he did not care about what they had written and expressing content that the authors of the letter "had been able to write in English". In his public response, Karygiannis denied making such a comment and complained that the letter was signed in part by "Turks and Macedonians, who don't like it, because I am Greek, and they have problems with Greeks." As for Tsai's discontent, Karygiannis explained it by the Conservative candidate's feelings after having got "his butt kicked" during the election.

In July 2012, Karygiannis caused a diplomatic scandal when he travelled to the South Caucasus region of Nagorno-Karabakh on the invitation of the Armenian National Committee of Canada, which paid for the trip. Universally recognized as an integral part of Azerbaijan, including by Canada, Nagorno-Karabakh unilaterally declared independence in 1991 followed by a violent ethnic conflict claiming over 30,000 lives on both sides, causing more than 600,000 ethnic Azeris to be displaced as a result of an ethnic cleansing and resulting in the Armenian military occupation of 16% of Azerbaijan's territory. Karygiannis's mission in Nagorno-Karabakh was to observe a local presidential election, though described as unconstitutional, illegitimate and counter-productive to conflict resolution by the European Union, NATO, and specifically the OSCE, which mediates the conflict. The Azerbaijani ambassador to Canada Farid Shafiyev criticized Karygiannis for taking sides in the conflict and "pandering to radical elements within his constituency" in chase of "ethnic votes and disregarding international law." Shafiyev also pointed to Karygiannis's illegal entry in Nagorno-Karabakh, as he had not obtained a visa or special permission from the Azerbaijani government that are required to travel there, but had instead entered through Armenia. In addition, his stay on the disputed Azerbaijani territory was paid for by the government of Armenia. In response, Karygiannis who had been aware of Azerbaijan's objections to his visit affirmed his decision and offered to be invited to Azerbaijan as an observer for the next election, which Shafiyev turned down as unlikely, saying Karygiannis would be declared persona non grata and denied any future entry in Azerbaijan. The Canadian embassy in Ankara, also accredited to Azerbaijan, issued a statement on July 19 saying Canada would not recognize the election and that it supports Azerbaijan's territorial integrity. On August 1, members of Toronto's Azeri community held a protest in front of the office of the Liberal Party, defying Karygiannis's unsanctioned visit to Nagorno-Karabakh.

In February 2013, Karygiannis was accused of using his political position to intervene to facilitate the passage of five Greek musicians into Canada. He was reported to have misinformed the authorities about the purpose of their visit, stating they had intended to participate in his father's wake, when in fact they were coming to Canada to perform at a paid concert. Karygiannis did not comment other than confirming that he had intervened in the matter but "did not profit from it".

In February 2016, Karygiannis brought up the possibility of banning recording artist Beyoncé from Canada. The Super Bowl 50 halftime entertainer had a routine which paid tribute to the 50th anniversary of the Black Panthers. Karygiannis went public with his interpretation of the routine as "anti-policy" and "pro-gun culture". Karygiannis also said "All lives matter."

In May 2016, Karygiannis put forward a motion to the Toronto City Council to recognize a Greek genocide. The motion claimed that "450,000–750,000 Pontian and Anatolian Greeks were executed". The motion also claimed that the genocide was the first of the 20th century, which is false. The Herero and Namaqua genocide is widely considered as the first genocide of the 20th century.

== Awards ==
In 1999, Greek president Costis Stephanopoulos awarded him the decoration of the Officer's Gold Cross of the Order of Phoenix in recognition of his many public service contributions.

On December 12. 2003, he was sworn in as a member of the Queen's Privy Council for Canada. This gave him the honorific title "The Honourable" for Life.

In 2014, Karygiannis was awarded the Mkhitar Gosh Medal from the Government of Armenia for his substantial input in international recognition of the Armenian Genocide.

In 2014, he received the 25 Year of Karabakh Movement Gold Medal by the Government of The Nagorno-Karabakh Republic as the first Canadian to visit the Republic in 2012 to observe the Presidential Elections.
