= L'Amoreaux =

- Neighbourhood
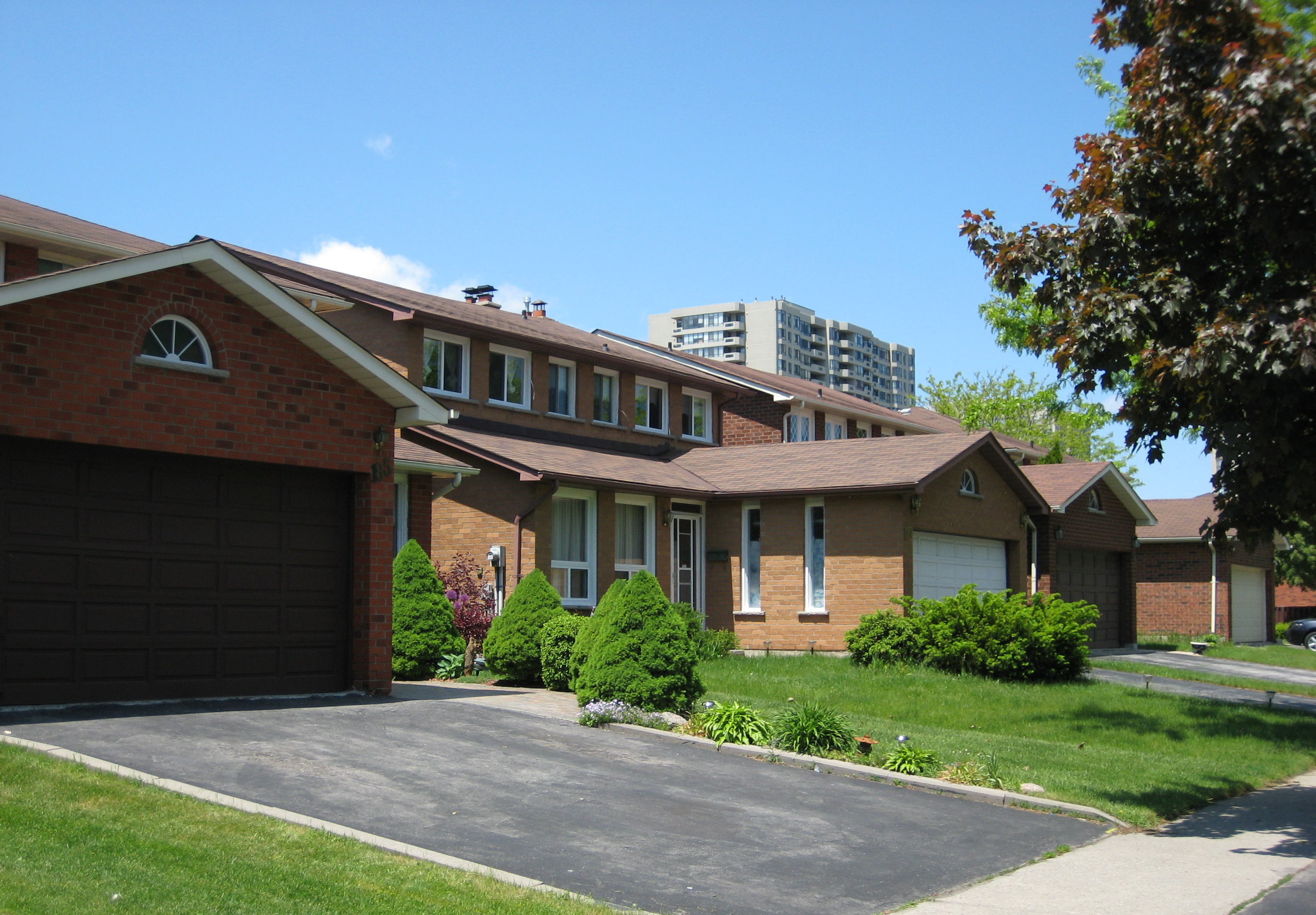
- Residences in L'Amoreaux

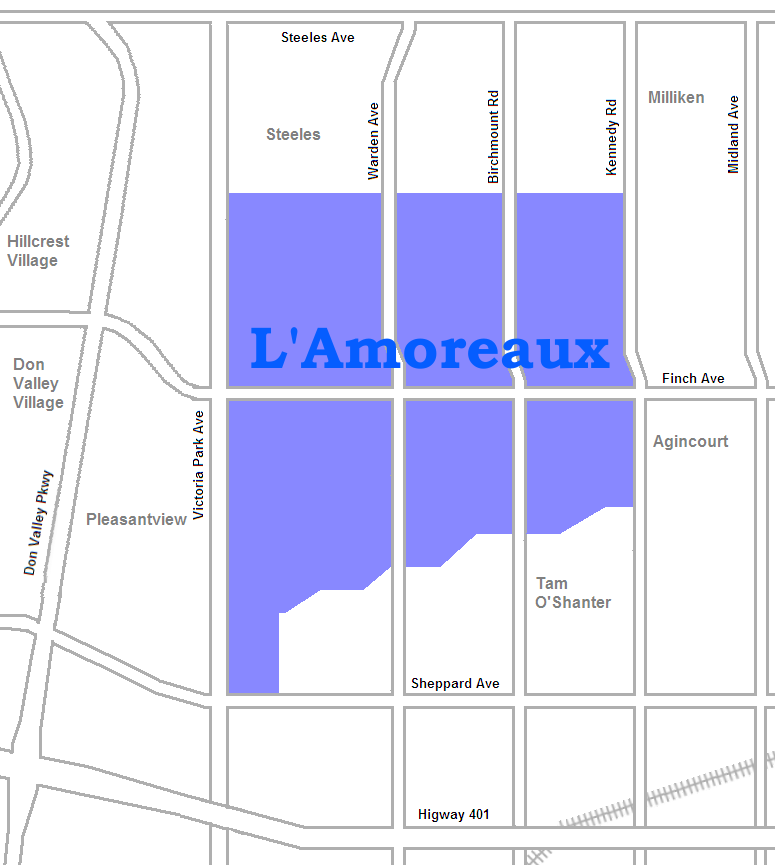

- Location within Toronto
- Coordinates: 43°47′40″N 79°19′33″W
- Country: Canada
- Province: Ontario
- City: Toronto
- Established: 1850 Scarborough Township
- Changed municipality: 1998 Toronto from City of Scarborough

Government
  - MP: Jean Yip (Scarborough—Agincourt)
  - MPP: Aris Babikian (Scarborough—Agincourt)
  - Councillor: Nick Mantas (Ward 22 Scarborough—Agincourt)

L'Amoreaux is a neighbourhood in Toronto, Ontario, Canada, situated east of Victoria Park Avenue, south of McNicoll Avenue, west of Kennedy Road and north of Huntingwood Drive. L'Amoreaux is named after Josue L'Amoreaux (1738–1834), a French Huguenot loyalist who settled in the area. Prior to the amalgamation of Toronto in 1998, L'Amoreaux was a neighbourhood of the former city of Scarborough, and prior to the amalgamation of municipalities, it formed part of the town of Agincourt.

== History ==
European settlement began when Josue L'Amoreaux arrived via New York City with wife Elizabeth, seven children and two nephews in 1816. The family spread throughout the Greater Toronto Area and eventually many later relatives returned to the United States. L'Amoreaux sold his land and moved to Markham, and the remaining family left Scarborough by 1840. St. Paul L'Amoreaux Church in Scarborough and Ebenzer United Church in Markham contains graves of L'Amoreaux descendants. L'Amoreaux Park, L'Amoreaux Community Centre and L'Amoreaux Tennis Centre perpetuate the L'Amoreaux name in the area.

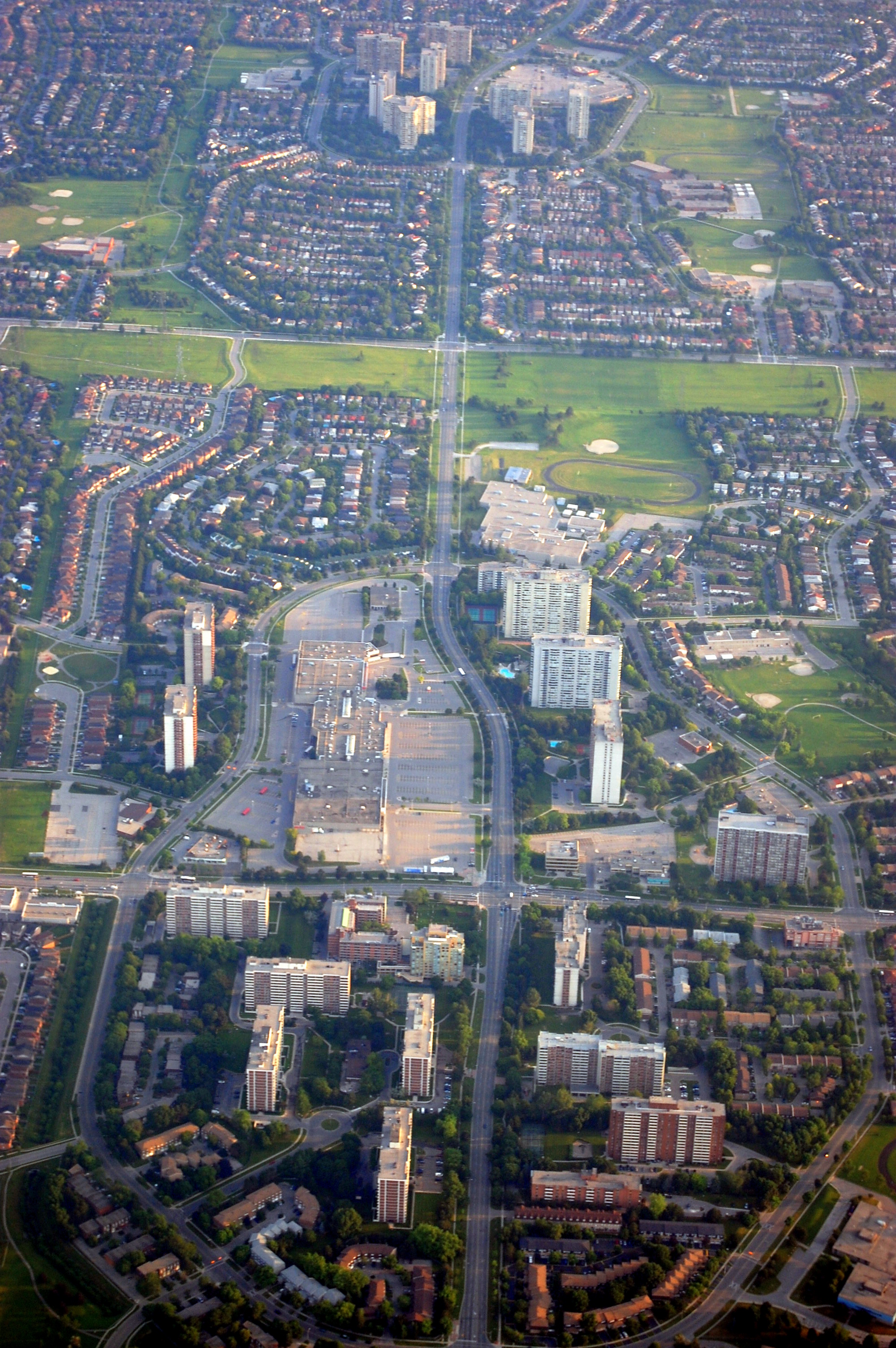
Aerial view of L'Amoreaux. The area developed into a residential area, made up of single-detached homes, townhouses, and high-rise apartments.

In 2000, farmland being developed for housing just north of L'Amoreaux Park North revealed the existence of a long-defunct Wyandot First Nations village. Similar in size to the Iroquoian Village at Crawford Lake Conservation Area, it had several longhouses. The site is known as the "Alexandra Site". After examination of the site and retrieval of artifacts, the site is now single-family housing. The site did not have any burial sites. Plaques were erected in L'Amoreaux Park North to mark the discovery. Archaeologists believe that the site is related to other sites found in Scarborough, such as Taber Hill and Thomson Park.

The area has developed into a suburban residential neighbourhood predominantly of single-family detached homes and townhomes, dating from the late 1950s, as well as some mid to high-rise apartment buildings and condominiums.

== Demographics ==
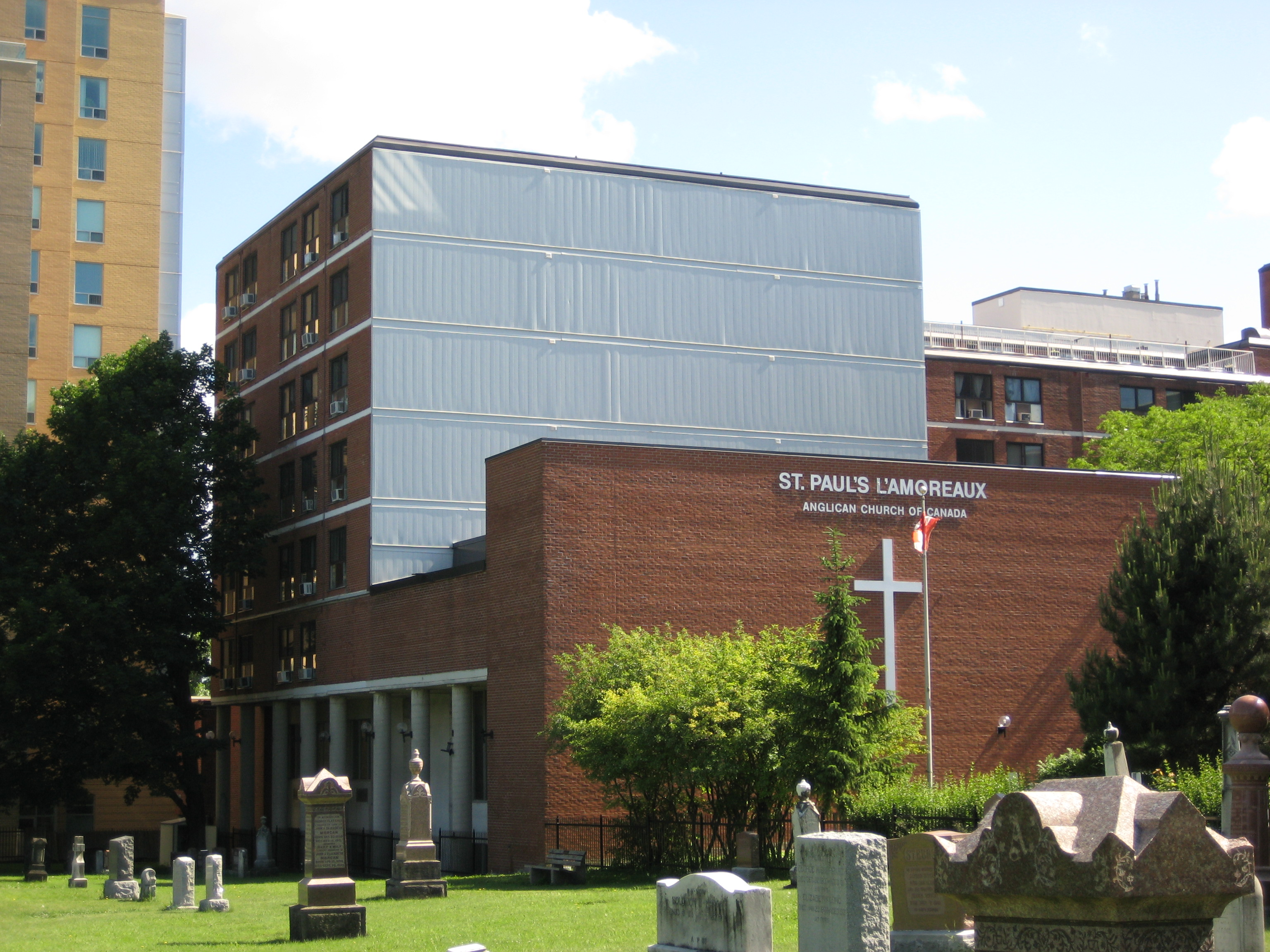
St. Paul Anglican Church, L'Amoreaux.

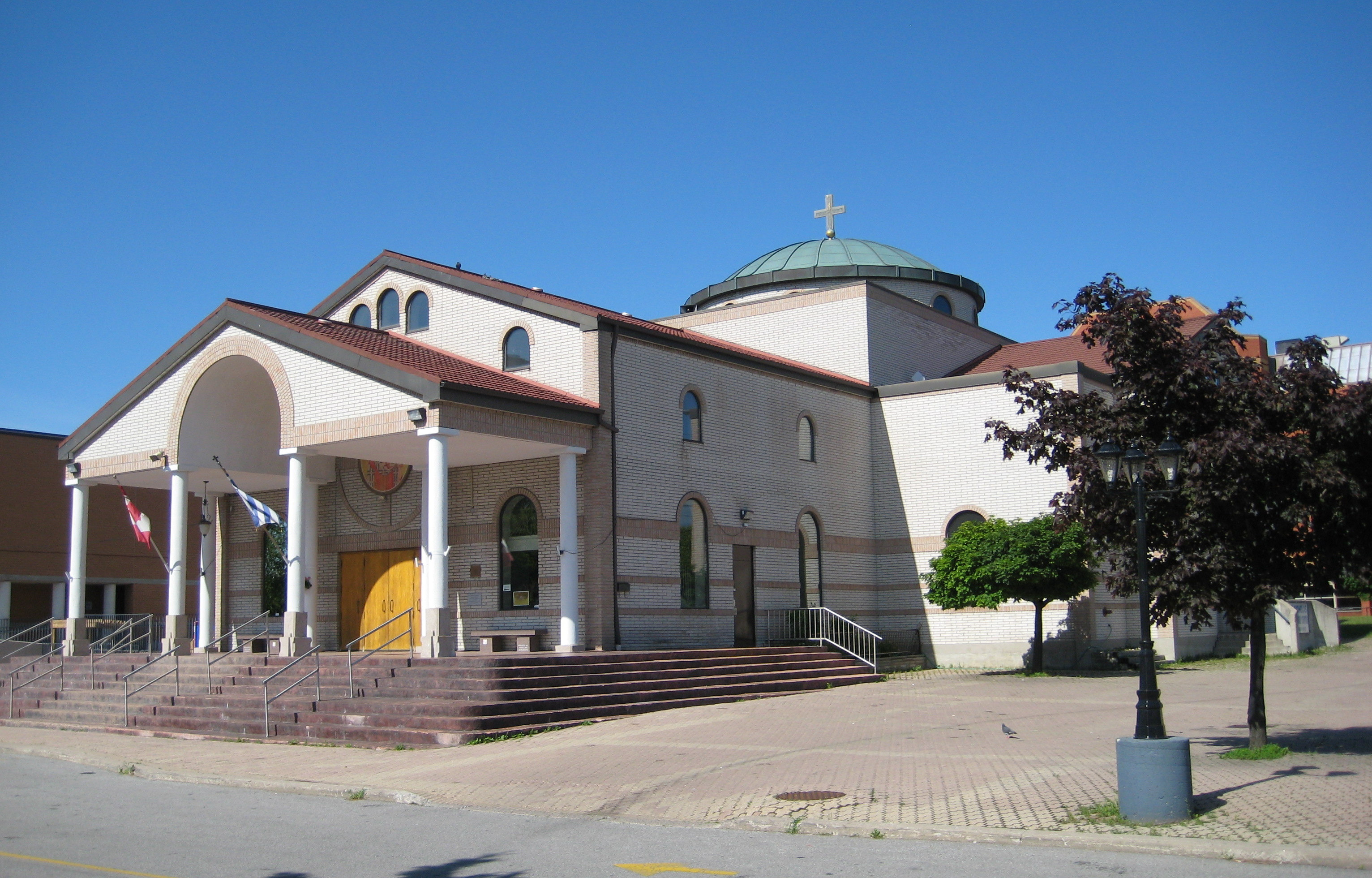
St. Nicholas Greek Orthodox Church located in L'Amoreaux.

The population of L'Amoreaux primarily made up of immigrants (68%), with the main countries of origin being China, Sri Lanka, and Philippines. In regards to ethnocultural diversity, Chinese, East Indian, and Canadian are reported as the three largest population groups. 53% of the population's home language is a non-official language, with Mandarin being the most common, followed by Cantonese, and Tamil. The unemployment rate of L'Amoreaux is 10.9%, 2.7% higher than the city.

== Economy ==
At the corner of Warden Avenue and Finch Avenue is Bridlewood Mall, an enclosed mall that is the largest retail building in the area. The mall is at the center of the Bridlewood housing development, with several apartment buildings adjacent.

== Education ==
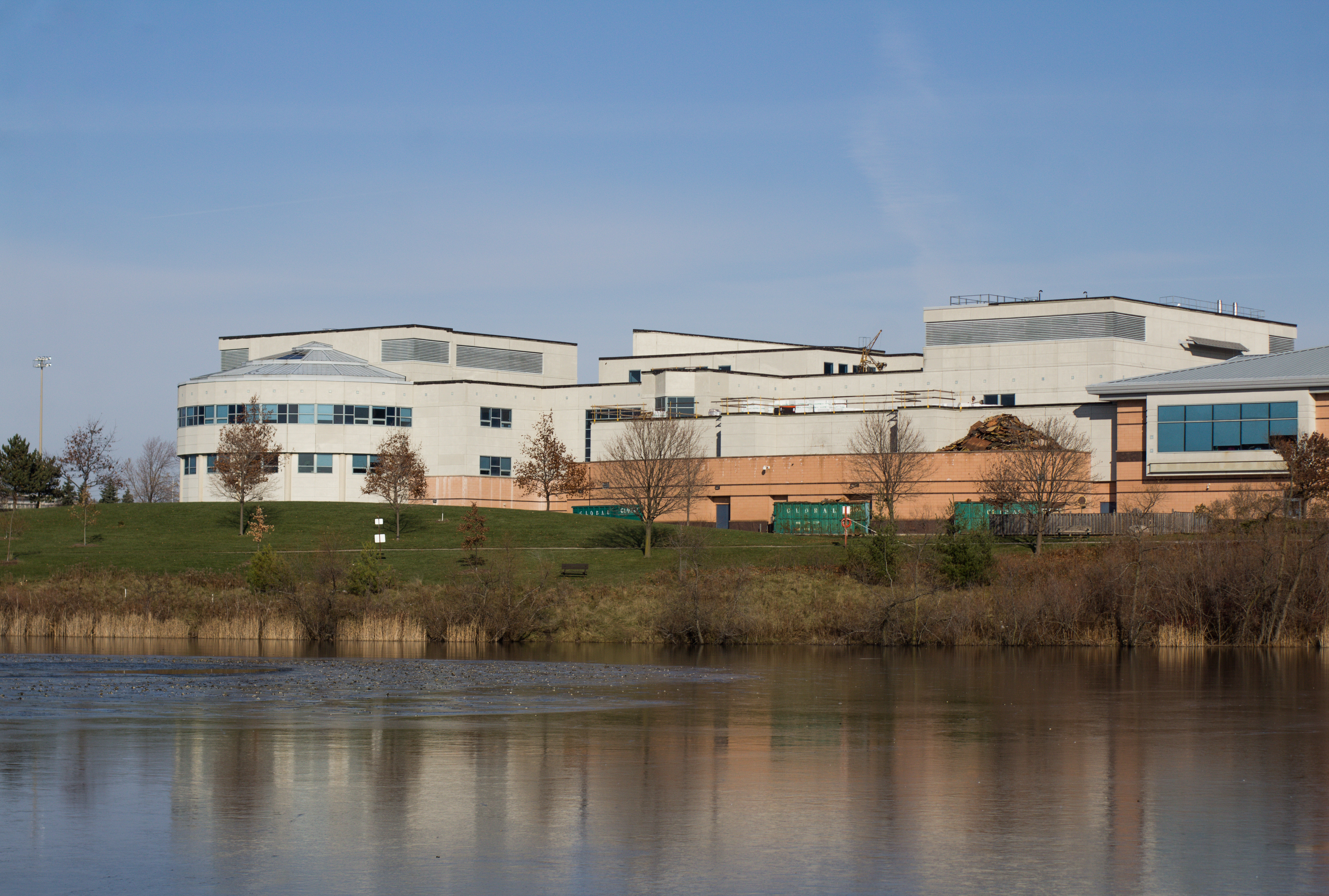
Mary Ward Catholic Secondary School in L'Amoreaux.

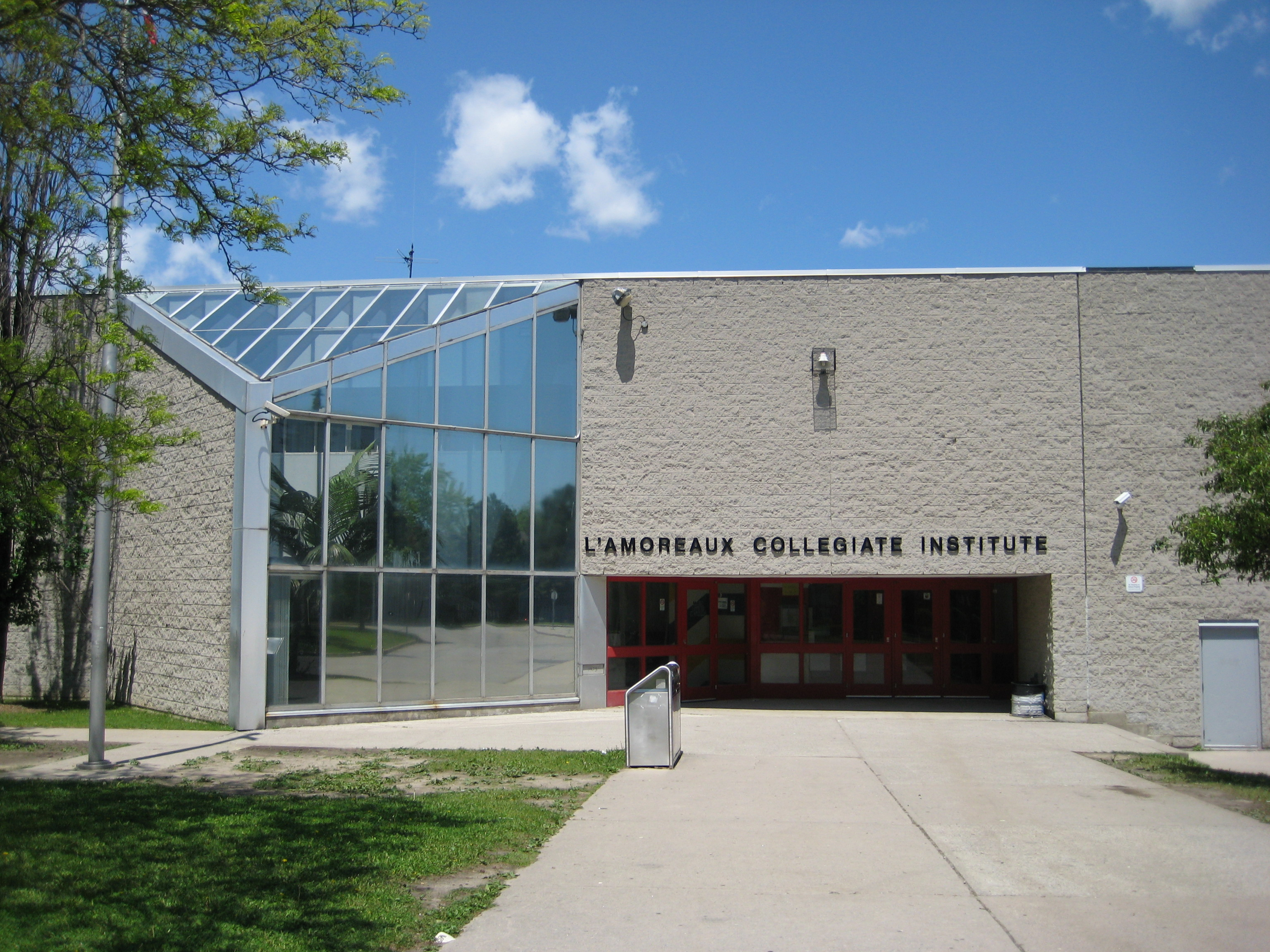
L'Amoreaux Collegiate Institute is a public secondary schools located in the neighbourhood.

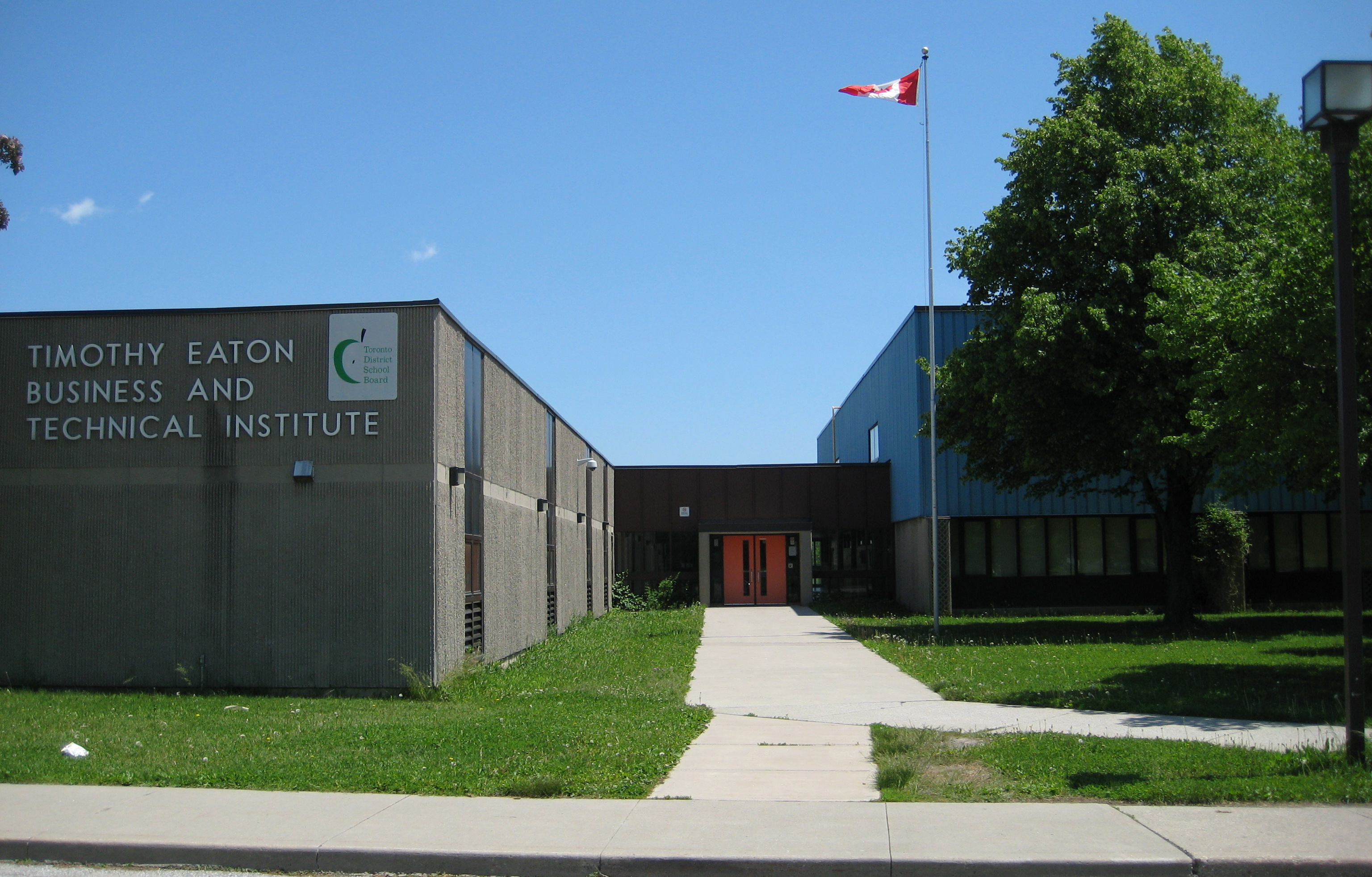
From 1971 until 2009, Timothy Eaton Business and Technical Institute served as a vocational school in that area.

Two public school boards operate elementary schools in L'Amoreaux, the Toronto District School Board (TDSB) and the Toronto Catholic District School Board (TCDSB). The former is a secular public school board, whereas the latter is a separate school board. Elementary schools in L'Amoreaux include:

- Beverly Glen Junior Public School (TDSB)
- Brookmill Junior Public School (TDSB)
- Epiphany of Our Lord Catholic Academy, formerly St. Cyprian Catholic School (TCDSB)
- Fairglen Junior Public School (TDSB)
- J. B. Tyrell Senior Public School (TDSB)
- Pauline Johnson Junior Public School (TDSB)
- Silver Springs Public School (TDSB)
- St. Aidan Catholic School (TCDSB)
- St. John Fisher Catholic School (TCDSB, defunct) - building houses Mary Ward LINC
- St. Henry Catholic School (TCDSB)
- St. Sylvester Catholic School (TCDSB)
- Timberbank Junior Public School (TDSB)

In addition to elementary schools, TDSB also operates two public secondary schools in the neighbourhood, L'Amoreaux Collegiate Institute, and Sir John A. Macdonald Collegiate Institute. Up until 2009, the TDSB previously operated Timothy Eaton Business and Technical Institute, a technical high school in the area.

== Notable residents ==
- Boi-1da, hip hop producer
- Maestro Fresh-Wes, hip hop musician
