= Scarborough—Agincourt (federal electoral district) =

Federal electoral district in Ontario, Canada

Coordinates: 43.796°N 79.310°W

Ontario electoral district
- Interactive map of riding boundaries from the 2025 federal election

Federal electoral district
- Legislature: House of Commons
MP
Jean Yip
Liberal
- District created: 1987
- First contested: 1988
- Last contested: 2021
- District webpage: profile, map

Demographics
- Population (2021): 104,423
- Electors (2015): 68,748
- Area (km²): 22
- Pop. density (per km²): 4,746.5
- Census division: Toronto
- Census subdivision: Toronto (part)

Scarborough—Agincourt is a federal electoral district in Toronto, Ontario, Canada that has been represented in the House of Commons of Canada since 1988. It covers the area of the City of Toronto bounded by Steeles Avenue East to the north, Highway 401 to the south, Victoria Park Avenue to the west, and Midland Avenue to the east.

== Geography ==
The riding covers the northwest of the Scarborough part of Toronto. It contains the neighbourhoods of Steeles, L'Amoreaux, Tam O'Shanter-Sullivan, Agincourt (west of Midland Avenue) and Milliken (west of Midland Avenue).

== Former boundaries ==
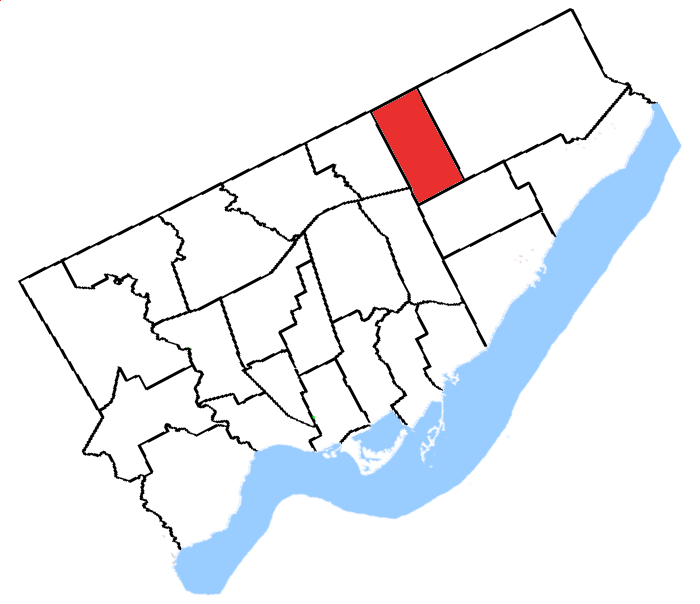
1987 to 1996

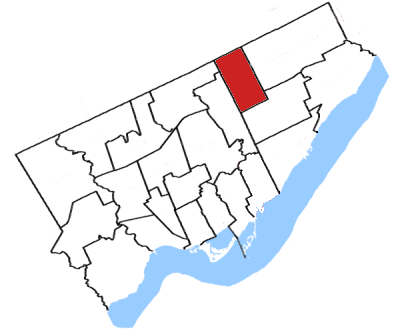
1996 to 2003 (remained the same)

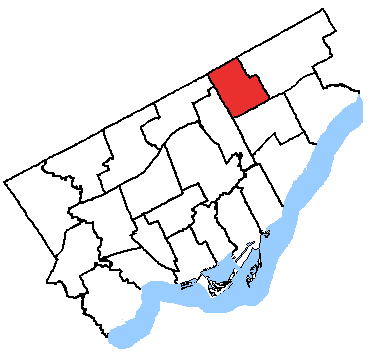
2003 to 2015

== Demographics ==
Immigrants make up 67.8% of the population of Scarborough—Agincourt, the highest such percentage for any Canadian federal riding; those from Asia and the Middle East alone, constitute a majority of the population (53.0%), which is also the highest figure for any federal riding, and, in particular, immigrants from the People's Republic of China are almost a quarter (24.7%) of the riding's population, another Canadian high. Chinese, not otherwise specified (i.e. Cantonese, Mandarin, etc.) is the home language for 12.0% of the people in Scarborough—Agincourt (another demographic record).

According to the 2021 Canadian census

Ethnic groups: 42.9% Chinese, 17.2% White, 15.0% South Asian, 7.2% Black, 6.3% Filipino, 2.1% Arab, 1.9% West Asian, 1.3% Southeast Asian, 1.1% Latin American
Languages: 30.2% English, 17.1% Cantonese, 17.0% Mandarin, 3.6% Tamil, 3.1% Tagalog, 2.6% Armenian, 2.0% Arabic, 1.3% Greek, 1.3% Urdu
Religions: 41.2% Christian (16.8% Catholic, 5.0% Christian Orthodox, 1.6% Anglican, 1.3% Pentecostal, 1.2% Baptist, 15.3% Other), 7.8% Hindu, 7.6% Muslim, 4.7% Buddhist, 37.5% none
Median income: $31,400 (2020)
Average income: $41,560 (2020)

== History ==
The federal riding was created in 1987 from York—Scarborough. It consisted in initially of the part of the City of Scarborough bounded on the west by Victoria Park Avenue, on the north by Steeles Avenue East, on the east by the Canadian National Railway line situated immediately west of Midland Avenue, and on the south by Ellesmere Road.

In 2003, it was given the boundaries as described above.

A by-election was held on June 30, 2014 as a result of the resignation of Member of Parliament Jim Karygiannis to run for City Councillor in the 2014 Toronto municipal election.

Following the 2012 federal electoral boundaries redistribution, the riding lost the part of the riding east of Midland Avenue to the new riding of Scarborough North.

Following the death of Member of Parliament Arnold Chan on September 14, 2017, his widow, Jean Yip, won the seat.

=== Members of Parliament ===
This riding has elected the following members of the House of Commons of Canada:

Parliament	Years	Member	Party
Scarborough—Agincourt; Riding created from York—Scarborough
34th	1988–1993	Jim Karygiannis	Liberal
35th	1993–1997	Jim Karygiannis	Liberal
36th	1997–2000	Jim Karygiannis	Liberal
37th	2000–2004	Jim Karygiannis	Liberal
38th	2004–2006	Jim Karygiannis	Liberal
39th	2006–2008	Jim Karygiannis	Liberal
40th	2008–2011	Jim Karygiannis	Liberal
41st	2011–2014	Jim Karygiannis	Liberal
41st	2014–2015	Arnold Chan	Liberal
42nd	2015–2017	Arnold Chan	Liberal
42nd	2017–2019	Jean Yip	Liberal
43rd	2019–2021	Jean Yip	Liberal
44th	2021–2025	Jean Yip	Liberal
45th	2025–present	Jean Yip	Liberal

== Election results ==
Graph of election results in Scarborough—Agincourt (since 1988, minor parties that never got 2% of the vote or didn't run consistently are omitted)

2025 Canadian federal election
Party	Candidate	Votes	%	±%	Expenditures
Liberal	Jean Yip	27,552	54.31	–1.93	
Conservative	Aris Movsessian	21,732	42.84	+13.67	
New Democratic	Dan Lovell	1,449	2.85	–7.17	
Total valid votes/expense limit		50,733			
Total rejected ballots		466			
Turnout		51,199	60.79		
Eligible voters		84,229			
Liberal notional hold		Swing		–7.80	
Source: Elections Canada

2021 federal election redistributed results
Party	Vote	%
Liberal	24,212	56.24
Conservative	12,558	29.17
New Democratic	4,340	10.08
People's	1,203	2.79
Green	742	1.72

2021 Canadian federal election
Party	Candidate	Votes	%	±%	Expenditures
Liberal	Jean Yip	20,712	56.54	+6.04	$85,348.74
Conservative	Mark Johnson	10,630	29.02	-8.03	$60,415.97
New Democratic	Larisa Julius	3,680	10.04	+1.34	$4,603.16
People's	Eric Muraven	978	2.67	+1.42	$1,748.37
Green	Arjun Balasingham	631	1.72	-0.79	$5,423.76
Total valid votes/expense limit		36,630	–	–	$106,493.49
Total rejected ballots		422	1.14	+0.01	
Turnout		37,052	53.16	-5.65	
Eligible voters		69,705			
Liberal hold		Swing		+7.04	
Source: Elections Canada

2019 Canadian federal election
Party	Candidate	Votes	%	±%	Expenditures
Liberal	Jean Yip	21,115	50.50	+1.09	$64,047.27
Conservative	Sean Hu	15,492	37.05	-3.50	$90,791.36
New Democratic	Larisa Julius	3,636	8.70	+3.63	$0.00
Green	Randi Ramdeen	1,050	2.51	+1.14	$0.00
People's	Anthony Internicola	521	1.25	-	none listed
Total valid votes/expense limit		41,814	98.87		
Total rejected ballots		476	1.13	+0.49	
Turnout		42,290	58.81	+31.99	
Eligible voters		71,907			
Liberal hold		Swing		+2.29	
Source: Elections Canada

On November 5, 2017, Prime Minister Justin Trudeau announced that a by-election would be held on December 11, 2017.

Canadian federal by-election, December 11, 2017 Death of Arnold Chan
Party	Candidate	Votes	%	±%
Liberal	Jean Yip	9,088	49.41	-2.54
Conservative	Dasong Zou	7,458	40.55	+2.42
New Democratic	Brian Chang	931	5.06	-2.79
Christian Heritage	Jude Coutinho	372	2.02	+1.22
Green	Michael DiPasquale	252	1.37	-0.00
Independent	Tom Zhu	148	0.80	
Independent	John "The Engineer" Turmel	145	0.79	
Total valid votes/expense limit		18,394	99.37	
Total rejected ballots		117	0.63	+0.04
Turnout		18,511	26.82	-32.59
Eligible voters		69,007		
Liberal hold		Swing		-2.53

2015 Canadian federal election
Party	Candidate	Votes	%	±%	Expenditures
Liberal	Arnold Chan	21,587	51.95	+6.38	$70,985.90
Conservative	Bin Chang	15,802	38.03	+3.88	$81,000.27
New Democratic	Laura Thomas Patrick	3,263	7.85	-10.14	$3,832.40
Green	Debra Scott	570	1.37	-0.92	–
Christian Heritage	Jude Coutinho	334	0.80	–	$621.16
Total valid votes/expense limit		41,556	99.41		$203,566.74
Total rejected ballots		248	0.59	–	
Turnout		41,804	59.42	–	
Eligible voters		70,355			
Liberal hold		Swing		+1.25	
Source: Elections Canada

2011 federal election redistributed results
Party	Vote	%
Liberal	17,197	45.57
Conservative	12,887	34.15
New Democratic	6,788	17.99
Green	866	2.29

Canadian federal by-election, June 30, 2014 Resignation of Jim Karygiannis
Party	Candidate	Votes	%	±%
Liberal	Arnold Chan	12,868	59.38	+13.98
Conservative	Trevor Ellis	6,344	29.27	−4.91
New Democratic	Elizabeth Ying Long	1,838	8.48	−9.62
Independent	Kevin Clarke	315	1.45	-
Green	Shahbaz Mir	307	1.42	−0.90
Total valid votes/expense limit		21,672	99.44	–
Total rejected ballots		121	0.56	−0.09
Turnout		21,793	29.43	−26.60
Eligible voters		74,062		
Liberal hold		Swing		+9.45
Source: Elections Canada

2011 Canadian federal election
Party	Candidate	Votes	%	±%	Expenditures
Liberal	Jim Karygiannis	18,498	45.39	−11.24	$59,289.81
Conservative	Harry Tsai	13,930	34.18	+4.78	$78,678.16
New Democratic	Nancy Patchell	7,376	18.10	+8.79	$2,771.86
Green	Pauline Thompson	946	2.32	−2.32	$0
Total valid votes/expense limit		40,750	100.00	$84,591.02	$140,739.83
Total rejected ballots		266	0.65	+0.05	
Turnout		41,016	56.91	+2.75	
Eligible voters		72,069			
Liberal hold		Swing		−8.01	

2008 Canadian federal election
Party	Candidate	Votes	%	±%	Expenditures
Liberal	Jim Karygiannis	22,795	56.63	−5.96	$62,348.27
Conservative	Benson Lau	11,836	29.41	+5.58	$82,246.11
New Democratic	Simon Dougherty	3,748	9.31	−1.77	$1,915.89
Green	Adrian Molder	1,870	4.65	+2.15	$1,575.30
Total valid votes/expense limit		40,249	99.44	$82,589.11	$148,085.57
Total rejected ballots		228	0.56	+0.19	
Turnout		40,477	54.16	−7.58	
Eligible voters		74,734			
Liberal hold		Swing		−5.77	

2006 Canadian federal election
Party	Candidate	Votes	%	±%	Expenditures
Liberal	Jim Karygiannis	28,065	62.59	−1.5	$55,681
Conservative	Bill Redwood	10,684	23.82	+2.8	$61,542
New Democratic	David Robertson	4,969	11.08	+0.9	$6,968
Green	Casey Maple	1,120	2.49	+0.3	$0
Total valid votes/expense limit		44,838	100.00	$124,191	
Total rejected ballots		168	0.4	−0.1	
Turnout		45,006	61.74	+5.3	
Eligible voters		72,895	$76,434		

2004 Canadian federal election
Party	Candidate	Votes	%	±%	Expenditures
Liberal	Jim Karygiannis	26,400	64.1	−6.0	$61,321
Conservative	Andrew Faust	8,649	21.0	−3.0^{1}	$71,263
New Democratic	D'Arcy Palmer	4,182	10.2	+6.3	$4,124
Progressive Canadian	Tony J. Karadimas	1,048	2.5	Ø	$10,513
Green	Wayne Yeechong	919	2.2	Ø	$0
Total valid votes/expense limit		41,198	100.0	$147,222	
Total rejected ballots		224	0.5		
Turnout		41,422	56.4		
Eligible voters		73,391			
^{1}: Conservative Party change is based on the combination of Canadian Alliance and Progressive Conservative Party totals in 2000.

2000 Canadian federal election
Party	Candidate	Votes	%	±%	Expenditures
Liberal	Jim Karygiannis	26,986	70.1	+5.0	$62,964
Alliance	Andrew Faust	5,100	13.4	+2.6^{1}	$19,772
Progressive Conservative	Bruce Elliott	4,030	10.6	−7.2	$9,953
New Democratic	Michael Laxer	1,499	3.9	−2.4	$2,785
Canadian Action	Wayne Cook	341	0.9	Ø	$10,116
Marxist–Leninist	Sarah Thompson	112	0.3	Ø	$8
Total valid votes/expense limit		38,068	100.0	$105,599	
^{1}: Canadian Alliance change is based on Reform Party totals in 1997.

1997 Canadian federal election
Party	Candidate	Votes	%	±%	Expenditures
Liberal	Jim Karygiannis	25,995	65.1	+5.3	$47,944
Progressive Conservative	Rick Perkins	7,115	17.8	−3.4	$41,232
Reform	Edward Lee	4,291	10.8	−3.8	$0.00
New Democratic	Doug Hum	2,512	6.3	+4.0	$15,398
Total valid votes/expense limit		39,913	100.0	$104,574	

1993 Canadian federal election
Party	Candidate	Votes	%	±%
Liberal	Jim Karygiannis	24,739	59.8	+15.5
Progressive Conservative	Ben Eng	8,775	21.2	−21.2
Reform	Cyril Gibb	6,036	14.6	Ø
New Democratic	Joe José Perez	944	2.3	−9.3
National	Bruce Nord	270	0.7	Ø
Independent	Anne C. McBride	247	0.6	−0.4
Natural Law	Bill Morrison	194	0.5	Ø
Abolitionist	Michael Green	95	0.2	Ø
Independent	Sp. Thakore	89	0.2	Ø
Total valid votes/expense limit		41,389	100.0	

1988 Canadian federal election
Party	Candidate	Votes	%
Liberal	Jim Karygiannis	19,459	44.3
Progressive Conservative	W. Paul McCrossan	18,601	42.4
New Democratic	Susie Vallance	5,082	11.6
Independent	Anne C. McBride	442	1.0
Libertarian	B.D.G. Antrobus	328	0.7
Total valid votes		43,912	

== Neighbourhoods ==
Three neighbourhoods fall completely within the borders of Scarborough—Agincourt:

- #116 - Steeles
- #117 - L'Amoreaux
- #118 - Tam O'Shanter-Sullivan

The west ends of three neighbourhoods also fall within the borders of Scarborough—Agincourt:

- #128 - Agincourt South-Malvern West
- #129 - Agincourt North
- #130 - Milliken

In addition, there are other neighbourhoods such as Wishing Well, Lynngate and Bridlewood.

== See also ==
- List of Canadian electoral districts
- Historical federal electoral districts of Canada
