= Ward 22 Scarborough—Agincourt =

Municipal council district in Toronto, Ontario, Canada

- Constituency for the Toronto City Council
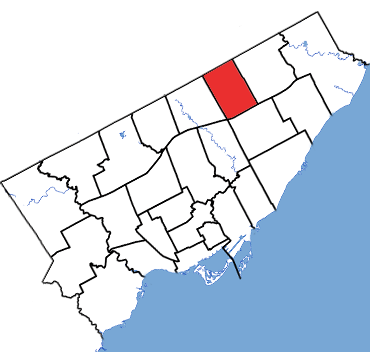
- Location of Ward 22 Scarborough—Agincourt in Toronto
- City: Toronto
- Population: 105,542 (2016)

Current constituency
- Created: 2018
- Councillor: Nick Mantas

Ward 22 Scarborough—Agincourt is a municipal ward in Toronto, Ontario, Canada. It is represented on Toronto City Council by Nick Mantas.

The ward covers an area of the City of Toronto bounded by Steeles Avenue East to the north, Highway 401 to the south, Victoria Park Avenue to the west, and Midland Avenue to the east. It contains the neighbourhoods of L'Amoreaux, Tam O'Shanter and part of Agincourt.

== Boundaries ==
On August 14, 2018, the Government of Ontario redrew municipal boundaries via the Better Local Government Act, 2018, S.O. 2018, c. 11 - Bill 5. This means that the 25 provincial electoral districts and the 25 municipal wards in Toronto currently share the same geographic borders.

Defined in legislation as:

Consisting of that part of the City of Toronto described as follows: commencing at the intersection of the northerly limit of said city with Midland Avenue; thence southerly along said avenue to Highway No. 401; thence westerly along said highway to Victoria Park Avenue; thence northerly along said avenue to the northerly limit of the City of Toronto; thence easterly along said limit to the point of commencement.

== History ==
=== 2018 boundary adjustment ===
Toronto municipal ward boundaries were significantly modified in 2018 during the election campaign. Ultimately the new ward structure was used and later upheld by the Supreme Court of Canada in 2021.

From 2000 to 2018, Scarborough—Agincourt was represented on city council by Wards 39 (northern half) and 40 (southern half). From 1998 to 2000 Scarborough—Agincourt was represented on city council by Ward 17, and returned two members. From 1988 to 1997 Scarborough—Agincourt was represented on Metropolitan Toronto Council until Scarborough's amalgamation into the city.

== Councillors ==
Post-2018 Boundary Adjustment

Council term	Member
2018–2022	Jim Karygiannis
2022–2026	Nick Mantas
2026–2030	Nick Mantas

== Election results ==
=== 2026 ===
Candidate	Votes	%	minus
Nick Mantas (X)	11,308	40.74	8.15 ▼
Bill Chan	4,815	17.35	–
Donny Morgan	3,283	11.83	–
Dan Lovell	2,529	9.11	–
Jackson Ho	1,660	5.98	–
Sindia Vijayarajan	1,170	4.22	–
Madhuri Azad	1,161	4.18	–
Serge Khatchadourian	1,106	3.98	4.24 ▼
Aaron Lal	452	1.63	–
Rakhee Kotecha	273	0.98	–

=== 2022 ===
Candidate	Vote	%
Nick Mantas	8,228	48.89
Bill Wu	3,153	18.73
Antonios Mantas	1,841	10.94
Roland Lin	1,549	9.20
Serge Khatchadourian	1,383	8.22
Anthony Internicola	677	4.02

=== 2021 by-election ===
A by-election was held on January 15, 2021 to replace Jim Karygiannis who was removed from city council after losing an appeal to the Supreme Court of Canada due to exceeding spending limits in the 2018 election.

In addition to in-person voting, this was the first municipal election in Toronto to offer a mail-in ballot. The ballot was the same as provided during in-person voting. In addition to sending the ballot by mail, residents were able to deliver it to one of two drop boxes or the city's elections warehouse.

Candidates

- Rocco Achampong: Lawyer. Ran for Mayor of Toronto in 2010; he finished 6 of 40 candidates, losing to Rob Ford, who he had endorsed. Noted for challenging Premier Doug Ford's reduction of Toronto city council's size in 2018, in the Superior Court of Ontario. He had declared as a candidate, before the decision.
- Sharif Ahmed
- Rigaud Bastien
- David Chenh
- Kevin Clarke: A "perennial candidate" since 1994. Most recently, he stood for appointment in 2018, when council looked to fill the Ward 41, Scarborough Rouge River seat, and in the 2020 Toronto Centre federal by-election.
- Jimmy Dagher
- Corey David: Socialist Action party candidate.
- Itohan Evbagharu: Member of the "City Youth Council Of Toronto". When Ward 41, Scarborough—Rouge River was made vacant in 2018, applied to be appointed as councillor. In the 2018 municipal election, she ran for election in Ward 24, Scarborough—Guildwood. Did not allow the City to make contact information publicly available.
- Lily Fang
- Jonathan Fon
- Kevin Haynes: Haynes' alleged, with evidence, that during the 2018 campaign, a lobbyist firm paid for people to canvass for candidates. The campaigns themselves did not pay, a loophole in the Municipal Elections Act, flag as far back as 2009. Haines previously released audio of incumbent councillor Jim Karygiannis saying that his supporters' bylaw infractions should be ignored.
- Anthony Internicola: Municipal candidate in Ward 40, Scarborough—Agincourt in 2014, finishing 3rd of 3 candidates, and in Ward 23 Scarborough North in 2018, finishing 11th of 11 candidates. People's Party of Canada candidate for Scarborough-Agincourt in the 2019 Canadian federal election.
- Renee Jagdeo: Urban planning student. Media coverage has focused on the fact that she would be the youngest councillor ever, if elected.
- Michael Julihen: Connects the COVID-19 pandemic to "ungodly living: repent." Not a resident of the ward. In 2018, he tried to be appointed as the councillor for Ward 33, Don Valley East, and later in the year campaigned for a council seat in Etobicoke—Lakeshore.
- Walayat Khan: Did not allow the City to make contact information publicly available, has no website for their platform, and no media coverage.
- Serge Khatchadourian: Small business owner.
- Ronald Lin: Translator, paralegal, business owner. In the 2018 municipal election, Lin received the most votes of a non-incumbent, finishing in third place.
- Christina Liu: Entrepreneur. Endorsed by Progressive Conservative MPPs Vijay Thanigasalam, Vincent Ke, Mike Parsa, Logan Kanapathi and Billy Pang and Conservative MP Bob Saroya.
- Tony Luk: Local entrepreneur who founded an immigration and translation services consultancy in 1989, in Scarborough-Agincourt. 30+ year resident in the Ward with heavy community involvement. Endorsed by York Regional councillor Joe Li, former Liberal MPPs Tony Ruprecht and Reza Moridi
- Paul Maguire
- Nick Mantas: Former chief of staff to Karygiannis. Endorsed by Progressive Conservative MPP Aris Babikian, former Liberal MPP Marie Bountrogianni and Conservative Senator Salma Ataullahjan.
- Varun Sriskanda - Masters in Law graduate from Osgoode Hall Law School and former constituency assistant to Sandra Pupatello
- Daniel Trayes - Finished last of 6 candidates in Ward 30, Toronto—Danforth, in the 2014 municipal election.
- Jeff Vitale
- Colin Williams
- Manna Wong: The school trustee for Scarborough—Agincourt 2014. Endorsed by the Elementary Teachers of Toronto, describing her as "a strong, principled leader who will be a progressive voice at City Hall."
- Yong Wu

Results

Council Candidate	Vote	%
Nick Mantas	3,261	26.98
Manna Wong	3,038	25.13
Christina Liu	1,760	14.56
Rocco Achampong	968	8.01
Tony Luk	848	7.02
Roland Lin	534	4.42
Jimmy Dagher	224	1.85
Serge Khatchadourian	224	1.85
Lily Fang	173	1.43
David Cheng	148	1.22
Paul Maguire	135	1.12
Varun Sriskanda	114	0.94
Renee Jagdeo	108	0.89
Yong Wu	108	0.89
Corey David	79	0.65
Walayat Khan	67	0.55
Sharif Ahmed	51	0.42
Jonathan Fon	42	0.35
Kevin Haynes	42	0.35
Kevin Clarke	38	0.31
Colin Williams	29	0.24
Itohan Evbagharu	26	0.22
Anthony Internicola	23	0.19
Daniel Trayes	17	0.14
Michael Julihen	14	0.12
Jeff Vitale	12	0.04
Rigaud Bastien	5	0.04

=== 2018 ===
Council Candidate	Vote	%
Jim Karygiannis	12,593	46.80
Norm Kelly	9,944	36.96
Roland Lin	2,789	10.37
Michael Korzeniewski	660	2.45
Vincent Lee	597	2.22
Jude Coutinho	234	0.87
Jason Woychesko	90	0.33

=== 2014 ===
==== Ward 39 ====
Council Candidate	Vote	%
Jim Karygiannis	9,438	57.98
Franco Ng	2,950	18.12
Cozette Giannini	1,600	9.83
Derek Li	723	4.44
Christopher Blueman	620	3.81
Patricia Sinclair	597	3.67
Clayton Jones	160	0.98
Jude Coutinho	111	0.68
Janet Rivers	78	0.48

==== Ward 40 ====
Council Candidate	Vote	%
Norm Kelly	16,052	85.97
Josh Borenstein	1,347	7.21
Anthony Internicola	1,273	6.82

=== 2010 ===
==== Ward 39 ====
Council Candidate	Vote	%
Mike Del Grande	9,931	68.18
Kevin Xu	3,640	24.99
Caldwell Williams	994	6.82

==== Ward 40 ====
Council Candidate	Vote	%
Norm Kelly	12,458	74.00
Ken Sy	1,935	11.49
Bryan Heal	1,862	11.06
Cheng-Chih Tsai	580	3.45

=== 2006 ===
==== Ward 39 ====
Council Candidate	Vote	%
Mike Del Grande	7,964	68.16
John Wong	1,888	16.16
Wayne Cook	660	5.65
Lushan Lu	614	5.25
Sunshine Smith	365	3.12
Samuel Kung	194	1.66

==== Ward 40 ====
Council Candidate	Vote	%
Norm Kelly	10,481	79.04
George Pappas	1,618	12.20
Sunny Eren	746	5.63
Winston Ramjeet	416	3.14

=== 2003 ===
==== Ward 39 ====
Council Candidate	Vote	%
Mike Del Grande	6,299	51.64
Sherene Shaw	5,898	48.36

==== Ward 40 ====
Council Candidate	Vote	%
Norman Kelly	10,570	75.38
Patrick McBrearty	2,470	17.61
Winston Ramjeet	983	7.01

=== 2000 ===
==== Ward 39 ====
Council Candidate	Vote	%
Sherene Shaw	8,474	76.52
Simon Kwan	1,531	13.83
Sunshine Smith	1,069	9.65

==== Ward 40 ====
Council Candidate	Vote	%
Norm Kelly	8,115	54.58
Mike Tzekas	4,322	29.07
Manna Wong	2,108	14.18
Winston Ramjeet	323	2.17

=== 1997 ===
Two to be elected

Council Candidate	Vote	%
Sherene Shaw	10,634	29.80
Doug Mahood	9,861	27.64
Wayne Cook	5,631	15.78
Jeff Mark	4,909	13.76
Doug Hum	4,645	13.02

=== 1994 ===
Council Candidate	Vote	%
Scott Cavalier	7,500	58.10
Anne McBride	3,601	27.90
Colin Turnpenney	1,808	14.01

=== 1991 ===
Council Candidate	Vote	%
Scott Cavalier	7,171	62.86
Anne McBride	4,236	37.14

=== 1988 ===
Council Candidate	Vote	%
Scott Cavalier	8,175	81.46
Eden Gajraj	1,861	18.54
