= Jean Yip =

Canadian politician

Jean Yip MP
- 葉嘉麗

Member of Parliament for Scarborough—Agincourt
- Incumbent
- Assumed office December 11, 2017
- Preceded by: Arnold Chan

Personal details
- Born: Jean Lee Yip; 1968 (age 57–58) Scarborough, Ontario, Canada
- Party: Liberal
- Spouse: Arnold Chan (died 2017)
- Education: University of Toronto
- Occupation: Insurance underwriter, constituency assistant

Jean Yip
- Traditional Chinese: 葉嘉麗
- Simplified Chinese: 叶嘉丽
Transcriptions
Standard Mandarin
- Hanyu Pinyin: Yè Jiālí
Yue: Cantonese
- Jyutping: jip^{6} gaa^{1}lai^{6}

Jean Lee Yip MP (born 1968) is a Canadian politician born in Scarborough, Ontario, who was elected to the House of Commons in a by-election on December 11, 2017. She represents the electoral district of Scarborough—Agincourt as a member of the Liberal Party of Canada caucus.

She was elected vice chair of the Canadian House of Commons Standing Committee on Public Accounts in the 45th Canadian Parliament in 2025.

Yip is the widow of her predecessor Arnold Chan, and first became prominent in the riding when she took time to assist her husband with constituency political duties during his cancer treatment.

== Election results ==
2025 Canadian federal election: Scarborough—Agincourt
Party	Candidate	Votes	%	±%	Expenditures
Liberal	Jean Yip	27,552	54.31	–1.93	
Conservative	Aris Movsessian	21,732	42.84	+13.67	
New Democratic	Dan Lovell	1,449	2.85	–7.17	
Total valid votes/expense limit		50,733			
Total rejected ballots		466			
Turnout		51,199	60.79		
Eligible voters		84,229			
Liberal notional hold		Swing		–7.80	
Source: Elections Canada

2021 Canadian federal election: Scarborough—Agincourt
Party	Candidate	Votes	%	±%	Expenditures
Liberal	Jean Yip	20,712	56.54	+6.04	$85,348.74
Conservative	Mark Johnson	10,630	29.02	-8.03	$60,415.97
New Democratic	Larisa Julius	3,680	10.04	+1.34	$4,603.16
People's	Eric Muraven	978	2.67	+1.42	$1,748.37
Green	Arjun Balasingham	631	1.72	-0.79	$5,423.76
Total valid votes/expense limit		36,630	–	–	$106,493.49
Total rejected ballots		422	1.14	+0.01	
Turnout		37,052	53.16	-5.65	
Eligible voters		69,705			
Liberal hold		Swing		+7.04	
Source: Elections Canada

2019 Canadian federal election: Scarborough—Agincourt
Party	Candidate	Votes	%	±%	Expenditures
Liberal	Jean Yip	21,115	50.50	+1.09	$64,047.27
Conservative	Sean Hu	15,492	37.05	-3.50	$90,791.36
New Democratic	Larisa Julius	3,636	8.70	+3.63	$0.00
Green	Randi Ramdeen	1,050	2.51	+1.14	$0.00
People's	Anthony Internicola	521	1.25	-	none listed
Total valid votes/expense limit		41,814	98.87		
Total rejected ballots		476	1.13	+0.49	
Turnout		42,290	58.81	+31.99	
Eligible voters		71,907			
Liberal hold		Swing		+2.29	
Source: Elections Canada

Canadian federal by-election, December 11, 2017: Scarborough—Agincourt Death of Arnold Chan
Party	Candidate	Votes	%	±%
Liberal	Jean Yip	9,091	49.44	-2.50
Conservative	Dasong Zou	7,448	40.51	+2.48
New Democratic	Brian Chang	931	5.06	-2.79
Christian Heritage	Jude Coutinho	371	2.02	+1.21
Green	Michael DiPasquale	253	1.38	+0.00
Independent	Tom Zhu	148	0.80	
Independent	John "The Engineer" Turmel	145	0.79	
Total valid votes/Expense limit		18,387	100.00	
Total rejected ballots				
Turnout		18,387	26.74	-32.68
Eligible voters		68,775		
Liberal hold		Swing		-2.49
