= List of neighbourhoods in Toronto =

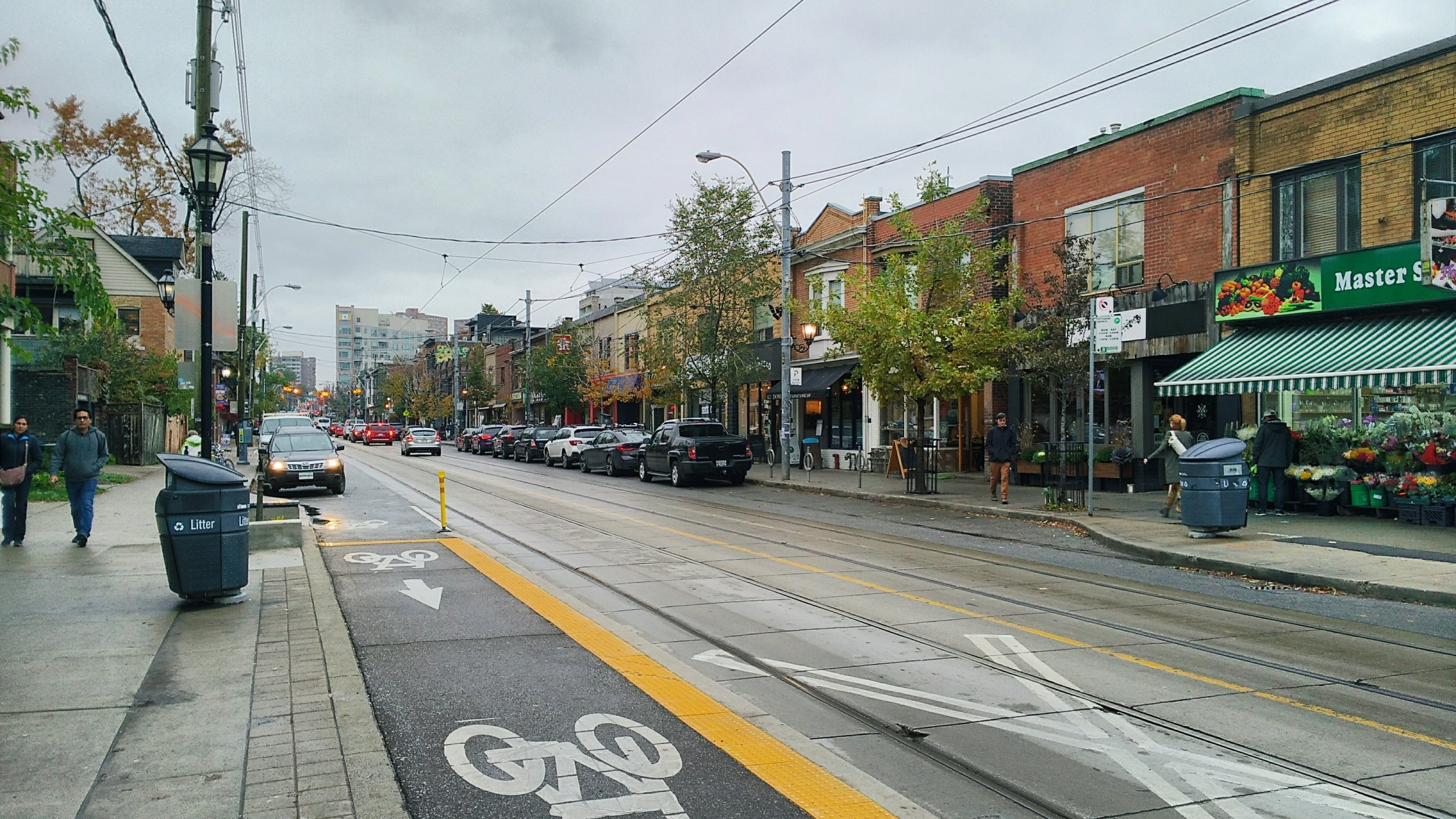
Roncesvalles, a 'core' neighbourhood of Toronto, in 2018

There are 158 neighbourhoods officially recognized by the City of Toronto (in 2022, 34 neighbourhoods were created from 16 of the previous 140) and upwards of 240 official and unofficial neighbourhoods within city limits.

The current City of Toronto is the amalgamation of the former Metropolitan Toronto municipalities. Along with the original City of Toronto, these are East York, Etobicoke, North York, Scarborough, and York. The names of these municipalities are still often used by Toronto residents, sometimes for disambiguation purposes as amalgamation resulted in duplicated street names. The area known as Toronto before the 1998 amalgamation is sometimes called by the retronyms "Old Toronto" and "the core". For administrative purposes, Toronto is divided into four districts: Etobicoke-York, North York, Scarborough and Toronto-East York.

Map of Toronto including the former municipalities that existed before 1998

The Old Toronto district is, by far, the most populous and densest part of the city. It is also the business and administrative centre of the city. The uniquely Torontonian bay-and-gable housing style is common throughout the former city. The "inner ring" suburbs of York and East York are older, predominantly middle-income areas, and ethnically diverse. Much of the housing stock in these areas consists of pre–World War II single-family houses and some post-war high-rises. Many of the neighbourhoods in these areas were built up as streetcar suburbs and contain many dense and mixed-use streets, some of which are one-way. They share many characteristics with sections of the "old" city outside the downtown core. The "outer ring" suburbs of Etobicoke, Scarborough, and North York are much more suburban in nature, although even these districts have some old-city characteristics (in particular southern Etobicoke along the shore of Lake Ontario) in areas bordering Old Toronto, and have developed modern urban centres of their own, such as North York City Centre around Mel Lastman Square.

The following is a list of the more notable neighbourhoods, organized by former municipality.

== Neighbourhoods by former municipality ==
=== Old Toronto ===
Old Toronto refers to the City of Toronto and its limits from 1967 to 1997. It is sometimes referred to as the "South" or "Central" district, and includes the downtown core. Some of these names such as "The Fashion District" are (or were) used as marketing for the areas or by BIAs; this area is actually called "King-Spadina" by locals. Another example is the "Old Town of York", also known as "King and Parliament" (although that intersection is one block east of the original ten blocks that formed the old town). According to Expat Arrivals, some neighbourhood locals also consider it to be a suburb of the main city of Toronto, as many choose to move there in pursuit of a more relaxed and "backwoods" vibe, though this is becoming no longer the case.

During the first quarter of the 21st century, much of Old Toronto had a boom in condominium construction.

Many were recreated or named to reconnect the areas with their past history, early beginnings, or even recent use and prominence. Some historical city "wards" used in the 19th century are no longer used: St. David's, St. John's, St. Paul's, St. George's, St. Andrew's, and St. Patrick's wards. There was a ward named for the patron saint of each of the three British nationalities: English (St. George), Scottish (St. Andrew), Welsh (St. David) and Irish (St. Patrick). St. George, St. Andrew and St. Patrick still survive as subway stations of the Toronto subway, though St. George station is not named after the ward, but after St. George Street instead, itself named after Quetton St. George, a local military officer and landowner. St. Lawrence's Ward (named after the patron saint of Canada and the river, itself also named after the saint) remains, known today as "St. Lawrence". St. Paul's (named after the saint) remains as the name of an electoral district for each of the three levels of government, although the electoral district has very little to no overlap with the historic St. Paul's Ward and beginning in the 2015 Canadian federal election, the electoral district was renamed Toronto—St. Paul's. This meant that the St. Paul's electoral district is a misnomer for much of the history of the electoral district.

For the purposes of geographic distinction, Old Toronto is broken down into four subsections:

==== Downtown Core (Central) ====
- Alexandra Park
- The Annex
- Baldwin Village
- Cabbagetown
- CityPlace
- Chinatown
- Church and Wellesley
- Corktown
- Discovery District
- Distillery District
- Entertainment District
- East Bayfront
- Fashion District
- Financial District
- Garden District
- Grange Park
- Harbord Village
- Harbourfront
- Kensington Market
- Little Japan (within the northern half of the former First Chinatown within what was once The Ward)
- Moss Park
- Old Town
- Quayside (future planned neighbourhood)
- Queen Street West
- Regent Park
- South Core
- St. James Town
- St. Lawrence
- Toronto Islands
- Trefann Court
- University (includes Huron–Sussex)
- West Don Lands
- Yorkville

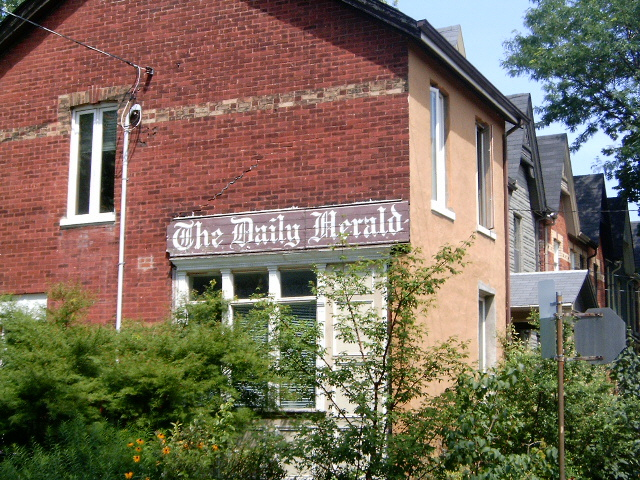
Old newspaper office in Cabbagetown in 2004

==== East End ====
- The Beaches (also known as The Beach)
- East Chinatown
- East Danforth (also known as Danforth Village)
- Gerrard Street East
- Gerrard India Bazaar (also known as Little India)
- Greektown (also known as The Danforth after the street it is on)
- Leslieville
- Main Square
- Ookwemin Minising (future planned high-density neighbourhood on an artificial island formerly known as Villiers Island at the mouths of the Don River in the Port Lands)
- Playter Estates
- Port Lands
- Riverdale (includes Riverside)
- Upper Beaches

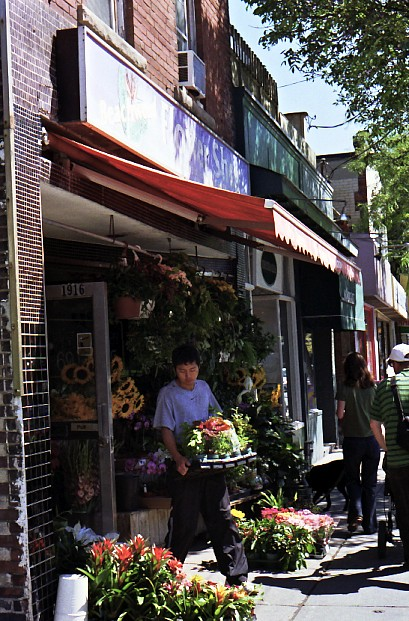
Shops along Queen Street East in the Beaches

==== North End ====
- Casa Loma
- Chaplin Estates
- Davisville Village
- Deer Park (Yonge and St. Clair)
- Forest Hill (and Forest Hill Village and Upper Village)
- Lawrence Park
- Lytton Park
- Midtown
- Moore Park
- North Toronto
- Rosedale
- South Hill (includes Rathnelly)
- Summerhill
- Uptown
- Wanless Park
- Wychwood Park
- Yonge–Eglinton (considered centre of Midtown Toronto and contains the former village of Eglinton)

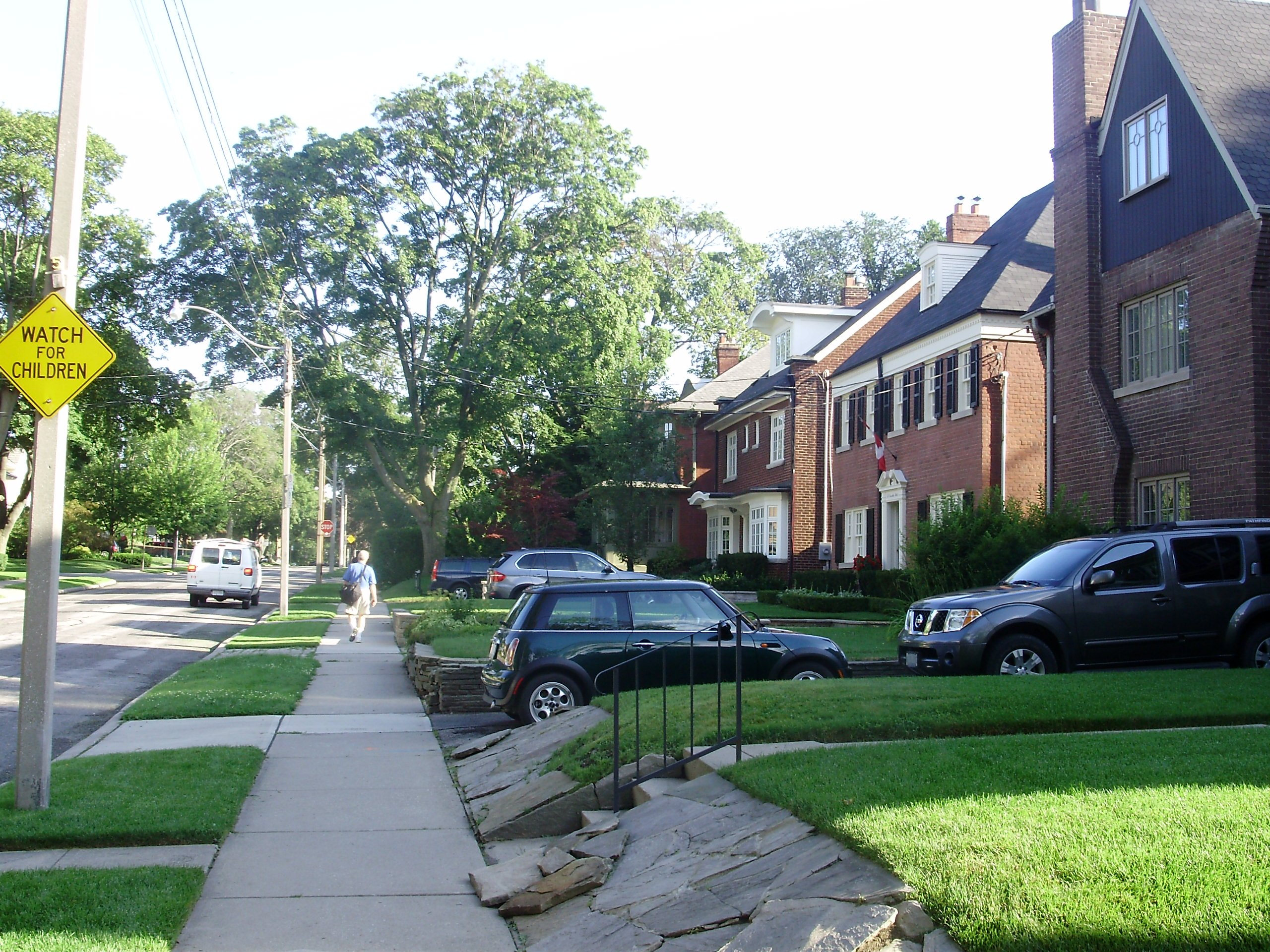
Chaplin Estates in North Toronto

==== West End ====
- Beaconsfield Village
- Bloor West Village
- Bloorcourt Village
- Bracondale Hill (Hillcrest; not to be confused with Hillcrest in North York)
- Brockton Village
- Carleton Village
- Corso Italia
- Davenport
- Dovercourt Park
- Dufferin Grove
- Earlscourt
- Fort York
- High Park
- The Junction (formerly West Toronto; a short section on Dundas Street also contains Little Malta)
- Junction Triangle
- Koreatown
- Liberty Village
- Little Italy
- Little Portugal
- Little Tibet
- Mirvish Village
- Niagara
- Ordinance Triangle
- Palmerston
- Parkdale
- Queen Street West
- Regal Heights
- Roncesvalles
- Runnymede
- Seaton Village
- Swansea
- Trinity–Bellwoods
- Wallace Emerson

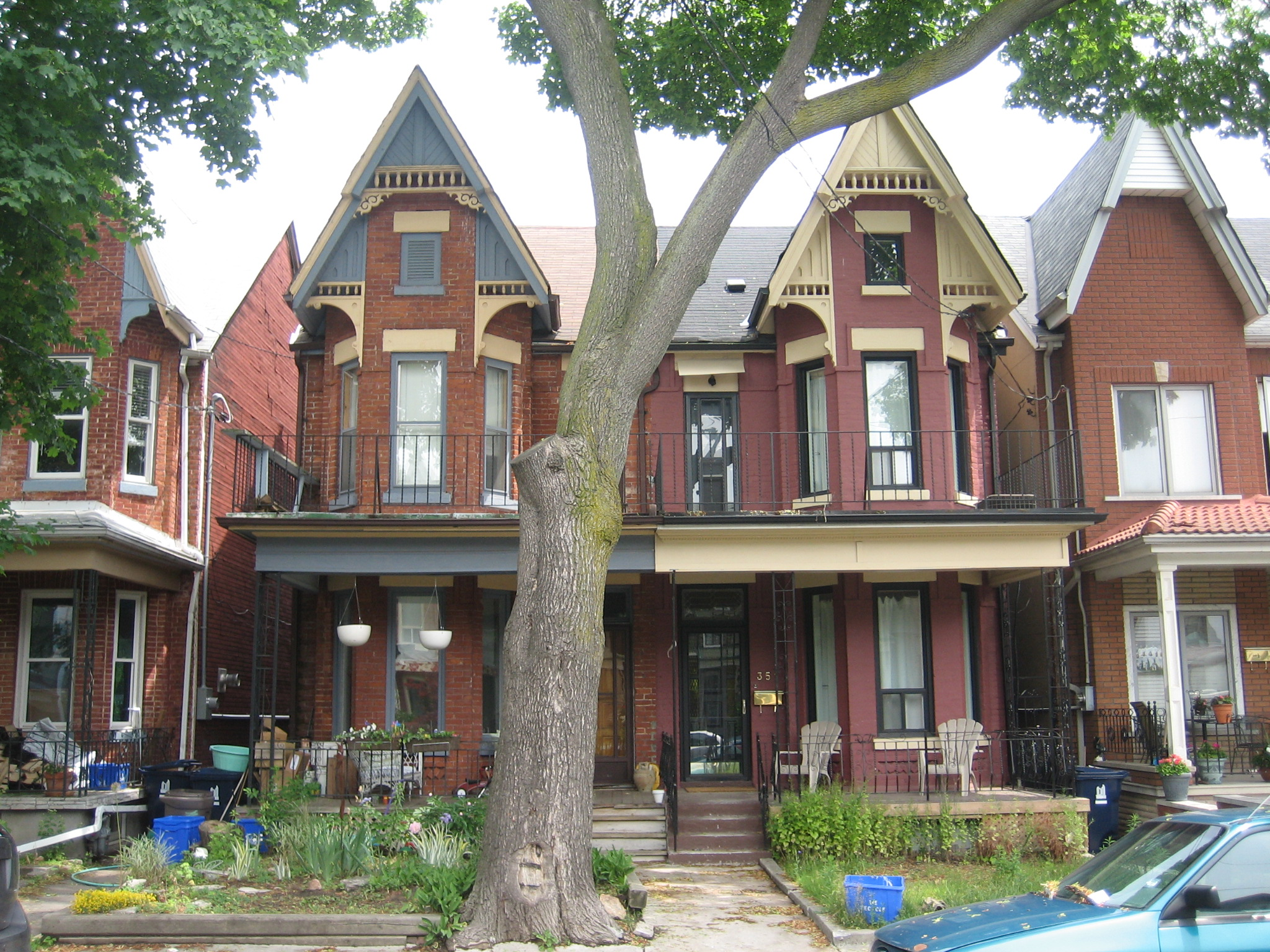
Bay-and-gable houses in Little Italy

=== East York ===
An autonomous urban borough until 1997, East York is primarily located north of Danforth Avenue between the Don River to the west and Victoria Park Avenue to the east, though the Shoppers World Danforth shopping plaza/mall hybrid, on the south side of Danforth Avenue west of Victoria Park Avenue, is located in East York. East York was an exclave of York from 1922 to 1924 and became a separate municipality to simplify governance. East York developed contemporaneously with the West End of old Toronto, and it is similar in form and character. In 1967, East York was expanded to include the Town of Leaside. Since the 1998 amalgamation, it is administered together with old Toronto, and separate from Scarborough, North York, and Etobicoke-York, by the "Toronto and East York Neighbourhood Council".

East York itself is commonly divided into two zones with mainly Edwardian urban neighbourhoods situated south of Taylor-Massey Creek and referred to as Old East York.

Old East York

- Broadview North
- Crescent Town
- East Danforth
- Pape Village
- Woodbine Heights

Suburban East York

- Bermondsey
- Governor's Bridge
- Leaside
- O'Connor–Parkview
- Thorncliffe Park

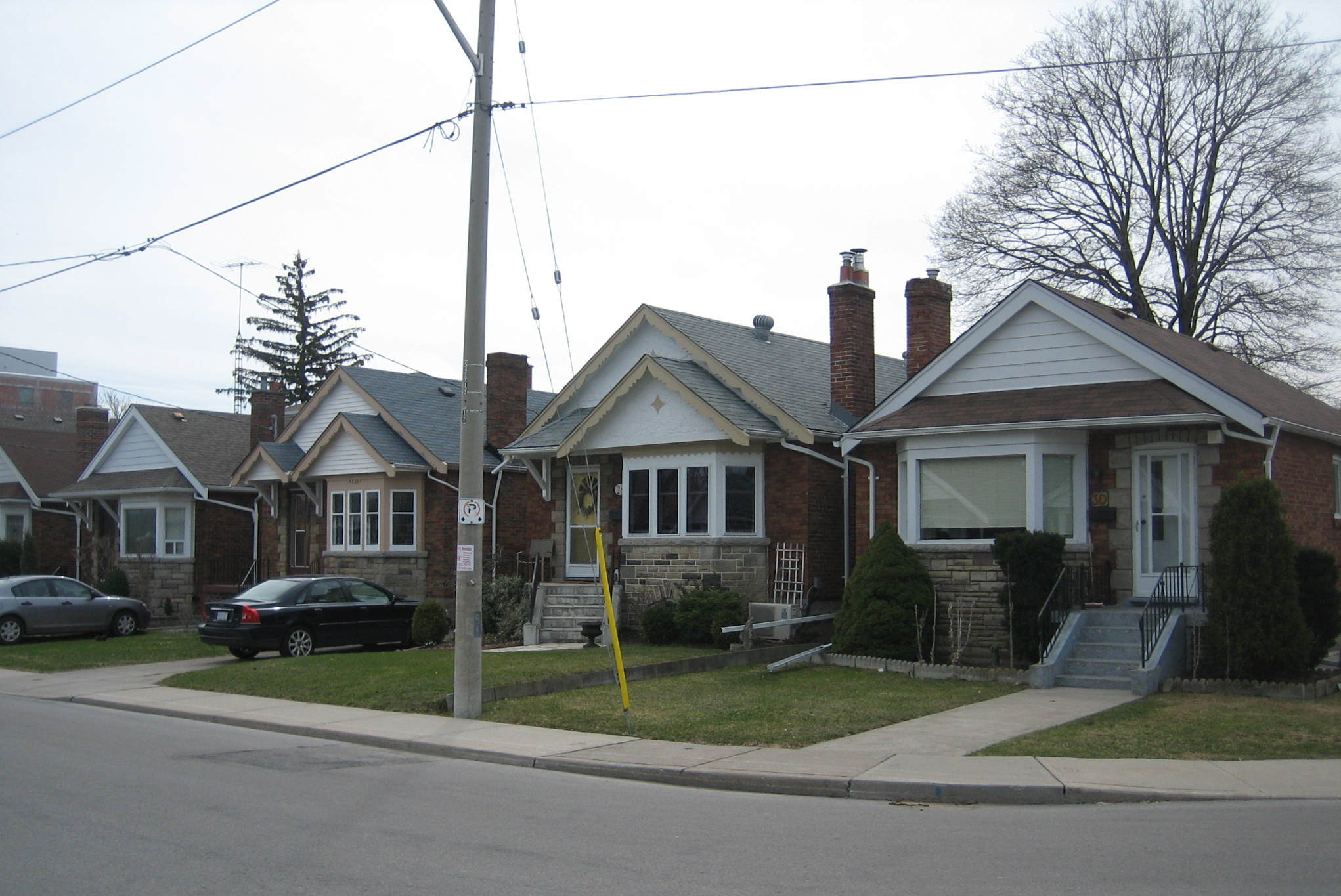
Bungalows in Old East York

=== Etobicoke ===
The former township and city of Etobicoke is on the west side of the Humber River. Several of its neighbourhoods, such as Long Branch, New Toronto, and Mimico, were villages independent of Etobicoke. Others, such as Claireville, Islington and Thistletown were former postal villages established when Etobicoke was still a rural township. Others are residential subdivisions built after World War II as the former Metro Toronto developed.

Etobicoke is often divided into three zones: north, central, and south, roughly approximate to that of the electoral districts of all three levels of government.

- Alderwood
- Centennial Park
- Claireville
- Eatonville (Etobicoke West Mall)
- The Elms
- Etobicoke City Centre
- Eringate-Centennial-West Deane
- Humber Bay
- Humber Heights-Westmount
- Humber Valley Village
- Humberwood
- Islington
- Kingsview Village (The Westway)
- The Kingsway
- Long Branch
- Markland Wood
- Mimico
- New Toronto
- Princess Gardens
- Rexdale
- Richview
- Smithfield
- Stonegate-Queensway
- Sunnylea
- Thistletown
- Thorncrest Village
- West Humber-Claireville
- West Deane Park
- Willowridge

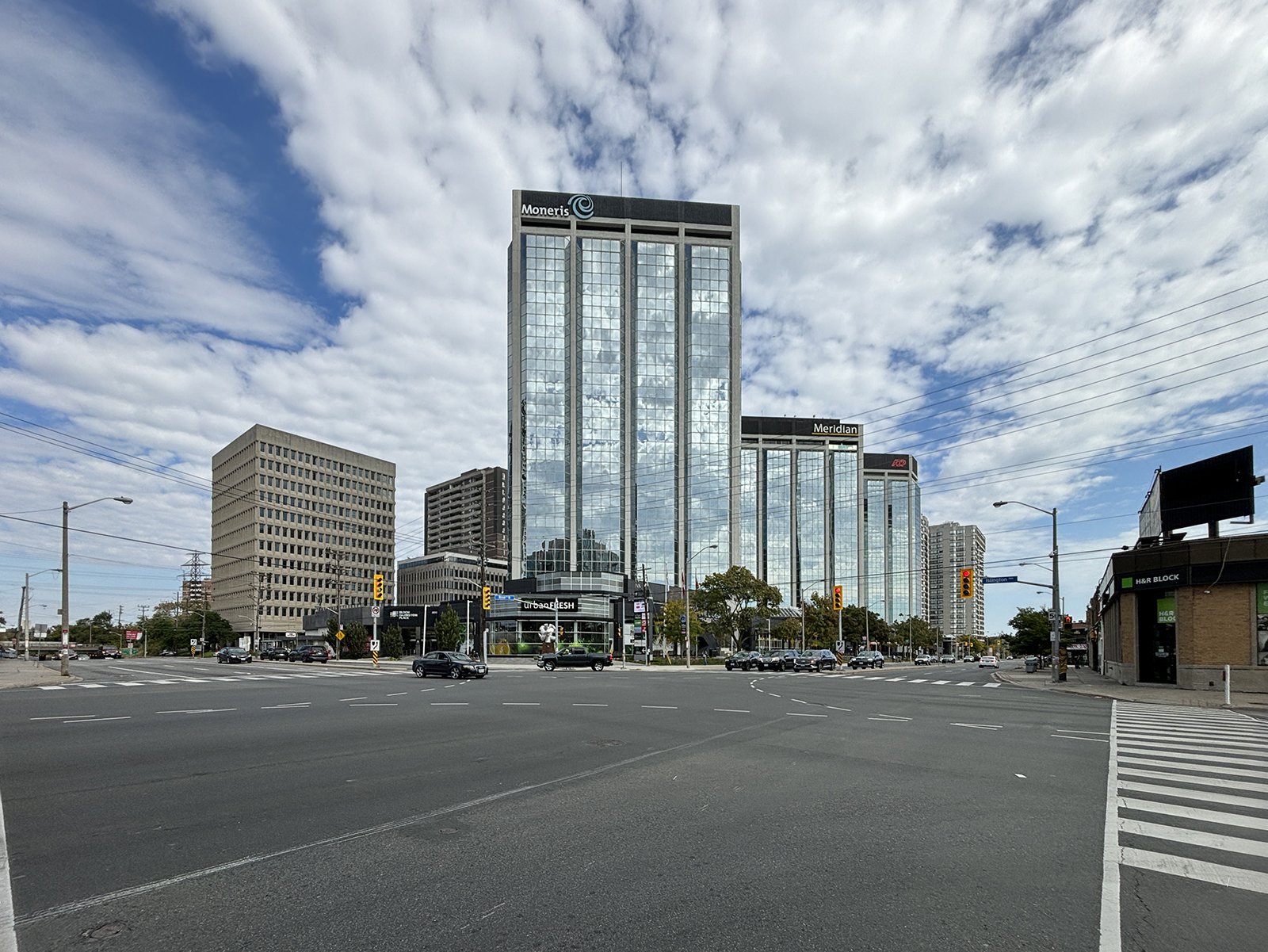
Bloor Islington Place at Islington-City Centre West in 2023

=== North York ===
The former city of North York is located north of York, Old Toronto, and East York, from the Humber River to the west, and Victoria Park Avenue to the east. North York is split by Yonge Street into an east section and a west section. Several of North York's neighbourhoods (such as Lansing, Newtonbrook and Willowdale) developed from postal villages when North York Township was primarily agrarian. Others are residential subdivisions developed after World War II. North York City Centre is a commercial district developed to be the 'downtown' of the city.

- Amesbury
- Armour Heights
- Bathurst Manor
- Bayview Village
- Bayview Woods-Steeles
- Bedford Park
- Bermondsey
- Black Creek
- The Bridle Path
- Clanton Park (Wilson Heights)
- Don Mills
- Don Valley Village (The Peanut)
- Downsview
- Flemingdon Park
- Glen Park (Yorkdale – Glen Park; Englemount; Marlee Village)
- Henry Farm
- Hillcrest Village (not to be confused with Hillcrest in Old Toronto, also known as Bracondale Hill)
- Hoggs Hollow
- Humber Summit
- Humbermede (Emery)
- Jane and Finch (University Heights; Elia)
- Lansing
- Lawrence Heights
- Lawrence Manor
- Ledbury Park
- Maple Leaf
- Newtonbrook
- North York City Centre
- Oakdale–Beverley Heights
- Parkway Forest
- Parkwoods
- Pelmo Park-Humberlea
- Pleasant View
- Uptown Toronto
- Victoria Village
- Westminster–Branson
- Willowdale
- York Mills
- York University Heights (Village at York)

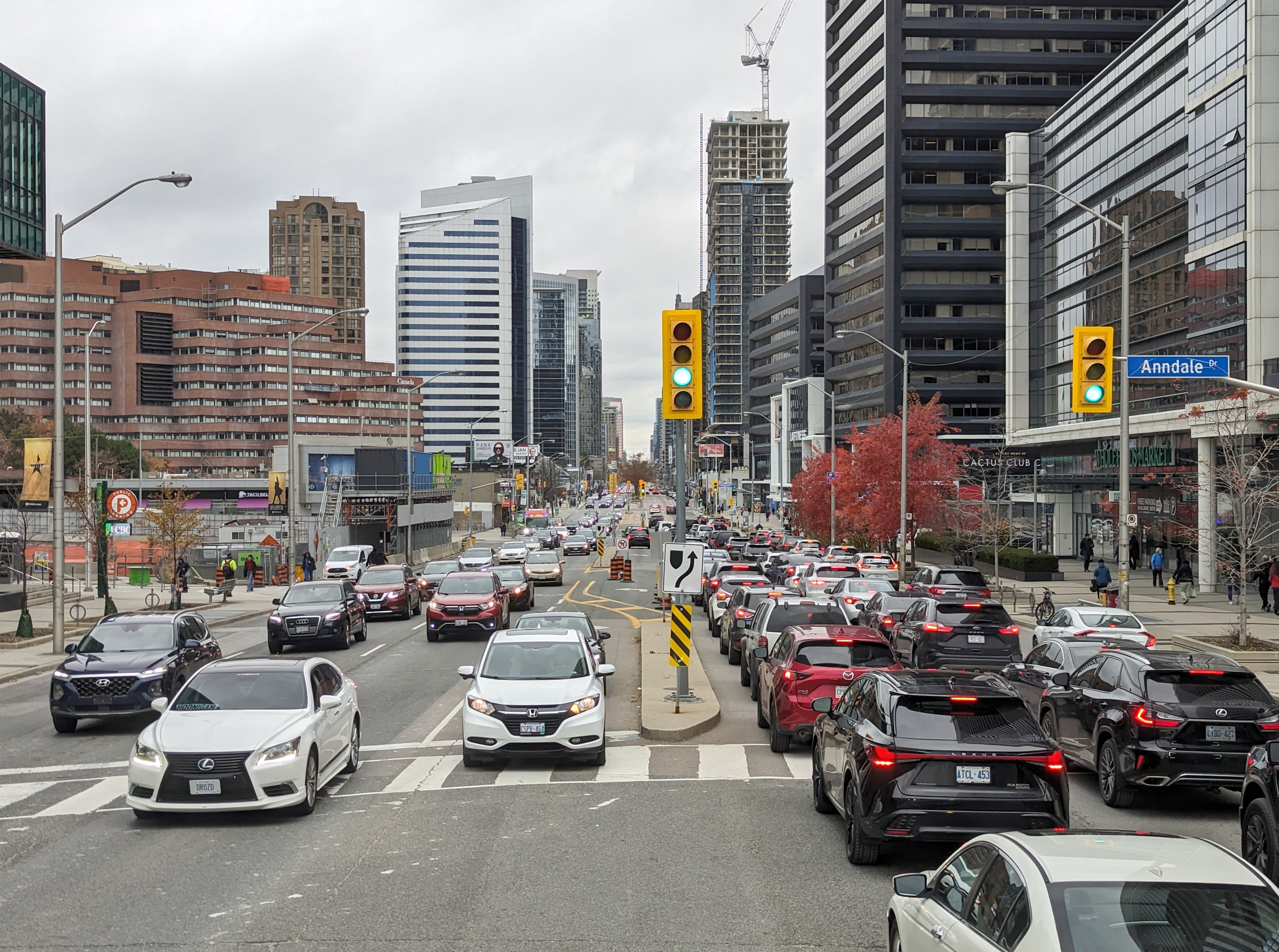
North York City Centre in 2023

=== Scarborough ===
The district of Scarborough extends from the east side of Victoria Park Avenue to the eastern limits of Toronto. West Rouge was transferred from Pickering to Scarborough in 1974 as part of the establishment of Durham Region. Scarborough is the largest district by area.

Many of the neighbourhoods, such as Agincourt, Brown's Corners and Milliken, correspond to former postal villages supporting the then-agrarian township. Others are residential subdivisions developed after World War II. Others are commercial districts.

- Agincourt
- Armadale
- Bendale (Cedarbrae)
- Birch Cliff
- Brown's Corners (historical)
- Clairlea
- Cliffside
- Cliffcrest
- Dorset Park
- Eglinton East
- Golden Mile
- Guildwood
- Highland Creek
- Ionview
- L'Amoreaux
- Malvern
- Maryvale
- Milliken (also in Markham)
- Morningside
- Morningside Heights
- Oakridge
- Port Union (Centennial Scarborough)
- Rouge
- Scarborough City Centre
- Scarborough Junction
- Scarborough Village
- Steeles
- Tam O'Shanter-Sullivan
- West Hill
- West Rouge
- Wexford
- Woburn

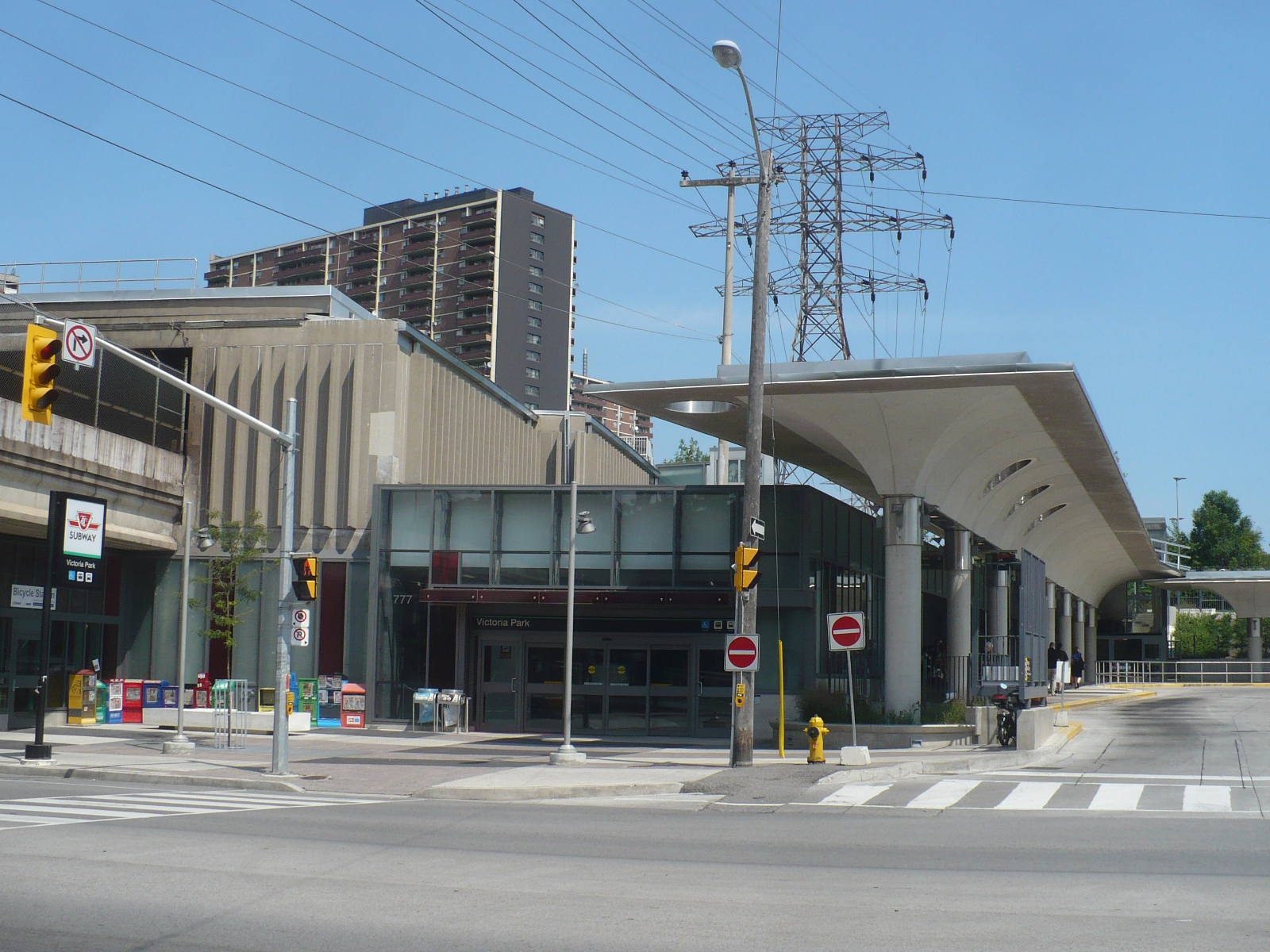
Victoria Park subway station and apartments in Oakridge in 2012

=== York ===
The former city of York is situated between Old Toronto and North York, west of Bathurst Street (aside from the neighbourhood of Tichester at the southeasternmost corner of the former city, which extends as far east as Walmer Road and includes much of St. Clair West station, including its northern unstaffed entrance on Heath Street West, as well as St. Michael's College School). The community of Weston, to the northwest, was itself an independent village until 1967. Several neighbourhoods are former residential subdivisions built on the limits with Toronto before and after World War II.

York is often divided into two sections: a western section and an eastern section, on either side of GO Transit's Barrie rail line.

- Briar Hill–Belgravia
- Fairbank (Caledonia–Fairbank)
- Humewood–Cedarvale (includes Upper Village (also part of Forest Hill))
- Lambton–Baby Point
- Little Jamaica (Eglinton West)
- Mount Dennis
- Oakwood Village (includes Five Points and Northcliffe; formerly known as Oakwood–Vaughan)
- Old Mill
- Rockcliffe–Smythe
- Silverthorn (Keelesdale)
- Tichester
- Weston

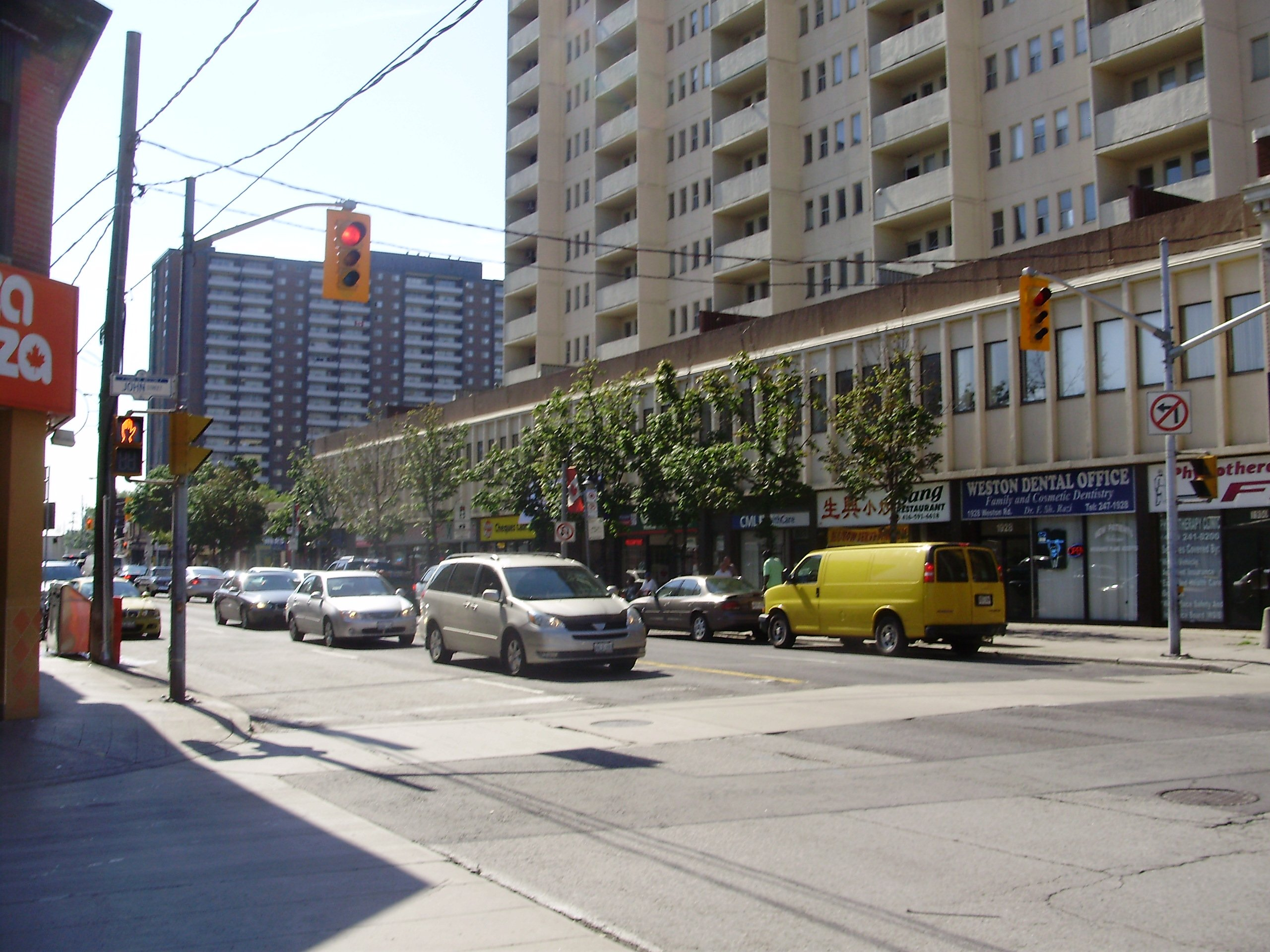
Businesses and apartments along Weston Road in Weston in 2008

== History ==
Toronto amalgamated twice: first in 1967 and second in 1998, the latter of which caused the dissolution of the Municipality of Metropolitan Toronto and became a single-tier municipality with a single municipal council.

== Lists of city-designated neighbourhoods ==
For administrative purposes, the City of Toronto divides the city into 158 neighbourhoods. These divisions are used for internal planning purposes. The boundaries and names often do not conform to the usage of the general population or designated business improvement areas. A number of neighbourhood maps of Toronto do exist, some produced by real estate firms and some by Internet portals. A project to map the neighbourhoods according to the common usage of the residents was done by the Toronto Star newspaper. Based on feedback from Toronto Star readers, it has produced the most comprehensive, albeit informal, neighbourhood map. 31 of these neighbourhoods are Neighbourhood Improvement Areas with the strategy to strengthen the social, economic and physical conditions and delivers local impact for city-wide change in these areas.

=== Table ===
CDN number	City-designated neighbourhood	Former city/borough	Neighbourhoods covered	Neighbourhood Improvement Area	Map
129	Agincourt North	Scarborough	Agincourt and Brimwood	N	
128	Agincourt South-Malvern West	Scarborough	Agincourt and Malvern	N	
20	Alderwood	Etobicoke	Alderwood	N	
95	Annex	Old City of Toronto	The Annex and Seaton Village	N	
42	Banbury-Don Mills	North York	Don Mills	N	
34	Bathurst Manor	North York	Bathurst Manor	N	
169	Bay–Cloverhill	Old City of Toronto		N	
52	Bayview Village	North York	Bayview Village	N	
49	Bayview Woods-Steeles	North York	Bayview Woods	N	
39	Bedford Park-Nortown	North York	Bedford Park, Ledbury Park, and Nortown	N	
112	Beechborough-Greenbrook	York	Keelesdale and Silverthorn	Y	
156	Bendale–Glen Andrew	Scarborough	Bendale	N	
157	Bendale South	Scarborough	Bendale	N	
122	Birchcliffe-Cliffside	Scarborough	Birch Cliff and Cliffside	N	
24	Black Creek	North York	Jane and Finch	Y	
69	Blake-Jones	Old City of Toronto	The Pocket and Riverdale	N	
108	Briar Hill-Belgravia	York	Fairbank	N	
41	Bridle Path-Sunnybrook-York Mills	North York	The Bridle Path and York Mills	N	
57	Broadview North	East York	Old East York	N	
30	Brookhaven-Amesbury	North York	Amesbury	N	
71	Cabbagetown-South St. James Town	Old City of Toronto	Cabbagetown and St. James Town	N	
109	Caledonia-Fairbank	York	Fairbank and Cedarvale	N	
96	Casa Loma	Old City of Toronto	Casa Loma and Wychwood	N	
133	Centennial Scarborough	Scarborough	Port Union and Centennial	N	
167	Church–Wellesley	Old City of Toronto	Church and Wellesley and Toronto Metropolitan University	N	
120	Clairlea-Birchmount	Scarborough	Clairlea	N	
33	Clanton Park	North York	Wilson Heights	N	
123	Cliffcrest	Scarborough	Cliffside	N	
92	Corso Italia-Davenport	Old City of Toronto	Corso Italia, Davenport, Earlscourt, and Regal Heights	N	
59	Danforth - East York	East York	Old East York, The Danforth	N	
66	Danforth	Old City of Toronto	The Danforth	N	
47	Don Valley Village	North York	Don Valley Village, The Peanut	N	
126	Dorset Park	Scarborough	Dorset Park	N	
168	Downtown Yonge East	Old City of Toronto		N	
171	Junction–Wallace Emerson	Old City of Toronto	Dovercourt Park, Wallace Emerson, Junction Triangle and Davenport	N	
172	Dovercourt Village	Old City of Toronto	Dovercourt Park	N	
155	Downsview	North York	Downsview	Y	
83	Dufferin Grove	Old City of Toronto	Brockton and Dufferin Grove	N	
62	East End-Danforth	Old City of Toronto	Upper Beaches, East Danforth	N	
148	Easr L'Amoreaux	Scarborough	L'Amoreaux, Leacock, and Bridlewood	N	
9	Edenbridge-Humber Valley	Etobicoke	Humber Valley	N	
138	Eglinton East	Scarborough	Eglinton East	Y	
5	Elms-Old Rexdale	Etobicoke	The Elms and Rexdale	Y	
32	Englemount-Lawrence	North York	Lawrence Manor and Glen Park	N	
11	Eringate-Centennial-West Deane	Etobicoke	Centennial Park and West Deane Park	N	
163	Fort York–Liberty Village	Old City of Toronto	Liberty Village, Exhibition Place	N	
159	Etobicoke City Centre	Etobicoke	Islington-Six Points	N	
13	Etobicoke West Mall	Etobicoke	Centennial Park and Eatonville	N	
44	Flemingdon Park	North York	Flemingdon Park	Y	
102	Forest Hill North	Old City of Toronto	Forest Hill	N	
101	Forest Hill South	Old City of Toronto	Forest Hill	N	
25	Glenfield-Jane Heights	North York	Jane and Finch	Y	
141	Golfdale–Cedarbrae–Woburn	Scarborough		Y	
65	Greenwood-Coxwell	Old City of Toronto	Leslieville	N	
140	Guildwood	Scarborough	Guildwood	N	
53	Henry Farm	North York	Henry Farm	N	
88	High Park North	Old City of Toronto	High Park North, West Bend	N	
87	High Park-Swansea	Old City of Toronto	High Park, Roncesvalles and Swansea	N	
134	Highland Creek	Scarborough	Highland Creek	N	
48	Hillcrest Village	North York	Hillcrest Village	N	
161	Humber Bay Shores	Etobicoke	Mimico, Humber Bay	N	
8	Humber Heights-Westmount	Etobicoke	Humber Heights-Westmount	N	
21	Humber Summit	North York	Humber Summit	Y	
22	Humbermede	North York	Humbermede and Emery	Y	
106	Humewood-Cedarvale	York	Cedarvale and Humewood	N	
125	Ionview	Scarborough	Ionview	Y	
158	Islington	Etobicoke	Islington-Six Points	N	
90	Junction Area	Old City of Toronto	The Junction	N	
110	Keelesdale-Eglinton West	York	Keelesdale and Silverthorn	Y	
124	Kennedy Park	Scarborough	Scarborough Junction	Y	
78	Kensington-Chinatown	Old City of Toronto	Alexandra Park, Chinatown, Grange Park, Kensington Market	N	
6	Kingsview Village-The Westway	Etobicoke	Kingsview Village and Richview	Y	
15	Kingsway South	Etobicoke	The Kingsway	N	
147	L'Amoreaux West	Scarborough	L'Amoreaux, Leacock, and Bridlewood	N	
114	Lambton Baby Point	York	Baby Point and Old Mill	N	
38	Lansing-Westgate	North York	Lansing	N	
105	Lawrence Park North	Old City of Toronto	Bedford Park, Teddington Park, and Wanless Park	N	
103	Lawrence Park South	Old City of Toronto	Lawrence Park, Lytton Park, North Toronto	N	
56	Leaside-Bennington	East York	Leaside	N	
84	Little Portugal	Old City of Toronto	Little Portugal and Brockton	N	
19	Long Branch	Etobicoke	Long Branch	N	
146	Malvern East	Scarborough	Malvern	N	
145	Malvern West	Scarborough	Malvern	N	
29	Maple Leaf	North York		N	
12	Markland Wood	Etobicoke	Markland Wood	N	
130	Milliken	Scarborough	Milliken	N	
160	Mimico–Queensway	Etobicoke	Mimico	N	
135	Morningside	Scarborough	Morningside	N	
144	Morningside Heights	Scarborough	Malvern	Y	
73	Moss Park	Old City of Toronto	Moss Park, Corktown and Garden District	N	
115	Mount Dennis	York	Mount Dennis	Y	
2	Mount Olive-Silverstone-Jamestown	Etobicoke	Smithfield	Y	
99	Mount Pleasant East	Old City of Toronto	Davisville Village, North Toronto	N	
18	New Toronto	Etobicoke	New Toronto	N	
50	Newtonbrook East	North York	Newtonbrook	N	
36	Newtonbrook West	North York	Newtonbrook	N	
68	North Riverdale	Old City of Toronto	Riverdale	N	
74	North St. James Town	Old City of Toronto	St. James Town	N	
173	North Toronto	Old City of Toronto	North Toronto	N	
54	O'Connor–Parkview	East York	Parkview Hills, Topham Park	N	
154	Oakdale–Beverly Heights	North York	Downsview	Y	
121	Oakridge	Scarborough	Oakridge	Y	
107	Oakwood Village	York	Oakwood Village	N	
58	Old East York	East York	Old East York	N	
80	Palmerston-Little Italy	Old City of Toronto	Little Italy and Palmerston	N	
149	Parkwoods–O'Connor Hills	North York	Parkwoods	N	
150	Fenside–Parkwoods	North York		N	
23	Pelmo Park-Humberlea	North York	Humberlea	N	
67	Playter Estates-Danforth	Old City of Toronto	Playter Estates and Greektown	N	
46	Pleasant View	North York	Pleasant View	N	
10	Princess-Rosethorn	Etobicoke	Princess Anne Manor, Thorncrest Village, and Princess Margaret	N	
72	Regent Park	Old City of Toronto	Regent Park, Trefann Court	Y	
4	Rexdale-Kipling	Etobicoke	Rexdale	N	
111	Rockcliffe-Smythe	York	Harwood, Syme	Y	
86	Roncesvalles	Old City of Toronto	Roncesvalles	N	
98	Rosedale-Moore Park	Old City of Toronto	Rosedale and Moore Park	N	
131	Rouge	Scarborough	West Rouge, Rouge Park	N	
89	Runnymede-Bloor West Village	Old City of Toronto	Runnymede-Bloor West Village	N	
28	Rustic	North York		Y	
139	Scarborough Village	Scarborough		Y	
174	South Eglinton–Davisville	Old City of Toronto	Davisville Village	N	
70	South Riverdale	Old City of Toronto		N	
85	South Parkdale	Old City of Toronto	Parkdale, South Parkdale	Y	
40	St. Andrew-Windfields	North York	York Mills and Hoggs Hollow	N	
116	Steeles	Scarborough		N	
16	Stonegate-Queensway	Etobicoke	Humber Bay, Queensway	N	
118	Tam O'Shanter-Sullivan	Scarborough		N	
61	Taylor Massey	East York	Crescent Town	Y	
63	The Beaches	Old City of Toronto	The Beach/Beaches, Beaches North	N	
3	Thistletown-Beaumond Heights	Etobicoke		Y	
55	Thorncliffe Park	East York		Y	
81	Trinity-Bellwoods	Old City of Toronto		N	
79	University	Old City of Toronto		N	
43	Victoria Village	North York		Y	
164	Wellington Place	Old City of Toronto		N	
165	Harbourfront–CityPlace	Old City of Toronto		N	
166	St Lawrence-East Bayfront The Islands	Old City of Toronto	Distillery District, Old Town, St. Lawrence	N	
136	West Hill	Scarborough		Y	
1	West Humber-Clairville	Etobicoke		N	
162	West Queen West	Old City of Toronto	Niagara	N	
143	West Rouge	Scarborough	Malvern	N	
35	Westminster-Branson	North York		N	
113	Weston	York		Y	
91	Weston-Pelham Park	Old City of Toronto	Carlton, Davenport, St. Clair Gardens	Y	
119	Wexford-Maryvale	Scarborough		N	
152	East Willowdale	North York		N	
153	Avondale	North York		N	
37	Willowdale West	North York		N	
7	Willowridge-Martingrove-Richview	Etobicoke		N	
142	Woburn North	Scarborough		Y	
64	Woodbine Corridor	Old City of Toronto		N	
60	Woodbine-Lumsden	East York		N	
94	Wychwood	Old City of Toronto		N	
170	Yonge–Bay Corridor	Old City of Toronto	Bay Street, Financial District	N	
100	Yonge–Eglinton	Old City of Toronto	Chaplin Estates	N	
151	Yonge–Doris	North York		N	
97	Yonge–St. Clair	Old City of Toronto		N	
27	York University Heights	North York		Y	
31	Yorkdale-Glen Park	North York	Glen Park, Lawrence Heights	N	

== Business improvement areas ==
There are also several dozen city designated business improvement areas, covering almost all of Toronto's commercial areas. Some of these serve a particular ethnic group or several similar ethnic groups as part of an ethnic enclave.

- Albion Islington Square
- The Beaches
- Bloor Annex
- Bloor by the Park
- Bloor West Village
- Bloor Yorkville
- Bloorcourt Village
- Bloordale Village
- Chinatown
- Church and Wellesley
- College Promenade
- College West
- Corso Italia
- Danforth Mosaic
- Danforth Village
- The Danforth
- Dovercourt Village
- Downtown Yonge
- Dundas Bathurst
- Dundas West
- Eglinton Hill
- Eglinton Way
- Emery Village
- Fairbank Village
- Forest Hill Village
- Gerrard India Bazaar
- Greektown on the Danforth
- Harbord Street
- Hillcrest Village (in Old Toronto; not to be confused with the one in North York)
- Historic Queen Street
- The Junction
- Kennedy Road
- Kingsway
- Knob Hill Plaza
- Koreatown
- Lakeshore Village
- Liberty Village
- Little Italy
- Little Jamaica
- Little Portugal
- Long Branch Village
- Mimico by the Lake
- Mimico Village
- Mirvish Village
- Mount Dennis
- Oakwood Village
- Old Cabbagetown
- Pape Village
- Parkdale Village
- Queen's Quay Harbourfront
- Regal Heights Village
- Riverside District
- Roncesvalles Village
- Rosedale Main Street
- Sheppard East Village
- St. Clair Gardens
- St. Lawrence Market Neighbourhood
- Toronto Entertainment District
- Upper Village
- Uptown Yonge
- Village of Islington
- West Queen West
- Weston Village
- Wexford Heights
- Wychwood Heights
- Yonge Lawrence Village
- Yonge + St. Clair
- York Eglinton

== Multiple listing service districts and neighbourhoods ==
After the update of Toronto Multiple listing service (MLS) on July 5, 2011, the Toronto Real Estate Board (TREB) introduced a new search feature for the Toronto MLS, used by real estate agents operating in the region. MLS searches can be refined at three levels and MLS users can search houses by area, then by municipality, and then by neighbourhood or community. As with the other MLS services for other jurisdictions, it used Microsoft's Bing Maps for its web mapping features until 2018, when it switched to Google Maps. These feature changes were the first change of this magnitude in about 50 years of Toronto MLS history since its establishment.

The change was designed to eliminate the obsolete coding systems whereby Greater Toronto was divided into 86 artificial districts denominated by alphanumeric codes. Due to the growing population in the city and the increasing difficulty of browsing the code-based system, the TREB made a radical change, which is intended to simplify the use of MLS for real estate agents and homebuyers.

Because Toronto is a populous municipality of its own, given that it is Canada's most populous city, the core city area will continue to be split into coded districts, although each of the districts will in turn contain neighbourhoods. Hence, the city will be easily searchable as well.

The following table contains a complete list of Toronto districts with a possibly incomplete list of Toronto neighbourhoods within each district:

District Number	Neighbourhoods Included
C01	Downtown, Harbourfront, Little Italy, Little Portugal, Dufferin Grove, Palmerston, University, Yonge–Bay Corridor, Kensington Market, Chinatown, Trinity Bellwoods, South Niagara, Island airport, The Islands, Waterfront communities, Queen's Park, Ontario Provincial Government, Victoria Hotel, Central Bay Street, First Canadian Place, Design Exchange, Adelaide, Union Station
C02	The Annex, Yorkville, South Hill, Summerhill, Wychwood Park, Deer Park, Casa Loma
C03	Forest Hill South, Oakwood Village, Humewood–Cedarvale, Corso Italia, Forest Hill Road Park
C04	Bedford Park, Lawrence Manor, North Toronto, Forest Hill North, Lawrence Park, Lawrence Heights, Roselawn
C06	North York, Clanton Park, Bathurst Manor
C07	Willowdale West, Newtonbrook West, Westminster–Branson, Lansing-Westgate
C08	Cabbagetown, St. Lawrence Market, Toronto waterfront, Moss Park, Church and Wellesley, Garden District, Regent Park, St. James Town, Toronto Metropolitan University, Berczy Park
C09	Moore Park, Rosedale
C10	Davisville Village, Midtown Toronto, Mount Pleasant, Davisville North, Davisville
C11	Leaside, Thorncliffe Park, Flemingdon Park
C12	York Mills, St.Andrew - Windfields, Bridle Path, Sunnybrook, York Mills West
C13	Don Mills, Parkwoods, Victoria Village, Banbury
C14	Newtonbrook East, Willowdale East, Newtonbrook
C15	Hillcrest Village, Bayview Woods-Steeles, Bayview Village, Don Valley Village, Henry Farm, Pleasant View
E01	Riverdale, Danforth (Greektown), Leslieville, Blake-Jones, Greenwood, Coxwell, Studio District
E02	The Beaches, Woodbine Corridor, East End - Danforth, The Beaches West, South Central Letter Processing Plant Toronto
E03	Danforth (Greektown), East York, Playter Estates, Broadview North (Old East York), O'Connor–Parkview, Crescent Town, Woodbine Heights, Woodbine Gardens, Parkview Hill
E04	The Golden Mile, Dorset Park, Wexford, Maryvale, Scarborough Junction (Kennedy Park), Ionview, Clairlea, Birchmount
E05	Steeles, L'Amoreaux West, Tam O'Shanter – Sullivan, Clarks Corners, L'Amoreaux
E06	Birch Cliff, Oakridge, Hunt Club, Cliffside
E07	Agincourt, Malvern West, Milliken
E08	Scarborough Village, Cliffcrest, Guildwood, Eglinton East (Knob Hill)
E09	Scarborough City Centre, Woburn, Morningside, Bendale (Cedarbrae), Cedarbrae
E10	Rouge (South), Port Union (Centennial Scarborough), West Hill, Highland Creek, Port Union
E11	Rouge (West), Malvern, Rouge, Upper Rouge
W01	High Park, South Parkdale, Swansea, Roncesvalles Village, Roncesvalles, Parkdale Village
W02	Bloor West Village, Baby Point, The Junction (Junction Area), High Park North, Runnymede, Dovercourt Park, Christie
W03	Keelesdale, Little Jamaica, Rockcliffe–Smythe, Weston-Pelham Park, Corso Italia, Davenport, Caledonia-Fairbanks
W04	York, Glen Park, Amesbury (Brookhaven), Pelmo Park-Humberlea, Weston, Fairbank (Briar Hill-Belgravia), Maple Leaf, Mount Dennis, Pelmo Park – Humberlea W4, Beechborough, Greenbrook, Yorkdale, Rustic, Glencairn, Upwood Park
W05	Downsview, Humber Summit, Humbermede (Emery), Jane and Finch (Black Creek or Glenfield-Jane Heights), York University Heights, York University, Pelmo Park – Humberlea W5, Downsview-Roding-CFB, Emery
W06	New Toronto, Long Branch, Mimico, Alderwood, Humber Bay Shores
W07	Sunnylea (The Queensway – Humber Bay), Sunnylea, Stonegate - Queenway, Thompson Orchard
W08	The Kingsway, Central Etobicoke, Eringate-Centennial-West Deane, Princess-Rosethorn, Edenbridge-Humber Valley, Islington–City Centre West, Markland Wood, Royal York South West, Princess Gardens, Humber Valley Village
W09	Kingsview Village-The Westway, Richview (Willowridge), Humber Heights-Westmount, Martin Grove Gardens, Kingsview Village, Westmount
W10	Rexdale, Claireville, Thistletown - Beaumond Heights, Smithfield: Mount Olive-Silverstone-Jamestown, The Elms (Elms-Old Rexdale), West Humber - Claireville, Mount Olive

== See also ==
- List of postal codes of Canada: M (Toronto postal codes primarily begin with the letter M)
