= Bracondale Hill =

- Neighbourhood
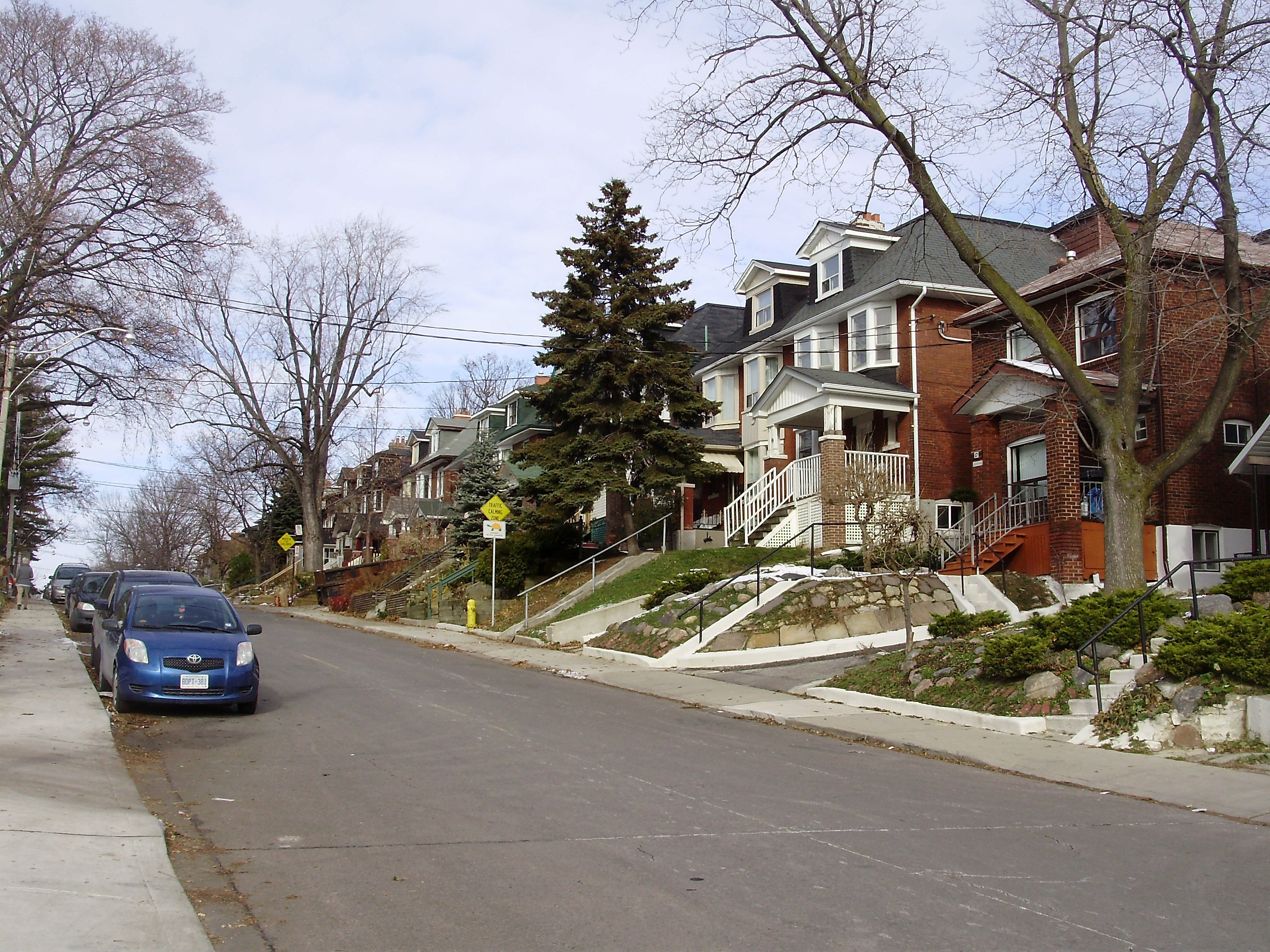
- Houses on Alberta Avenue

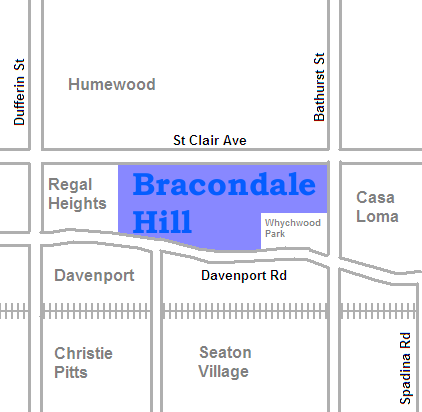
- Vicinity

- Location within Toronto
- Coordinates: 43.6762°N 79.4244°W
- Country: Canada
- Province: Ontario
- City: Toronto
- Community: Toronto
- Established: 1792 York County
- Township: 1793 York Township
- Annexed: 1909 Toronto

Bracondale Hill, also known as Hillcrest Village or Hillcrest (not to be confused with Hillcrest in North York), is a residential neighbourhood of Toronto, Ontario, Canada. Annexed by the old City of Toronto in 1909 and developed in 1911 from the Turner estate, Bracondale Hill is on the eastern border of West End Toronto; neighbouring Midtown (east of Bathurst), stretching above Davenport Road from the south, below St. Clair Avenue West from the north, Wychwood Park & Bathurst St. to the East and Winona Dr. to the West. This neighbourhood is home to the Hillcrest Village Business Improvement Area (BIA).

== Character ==
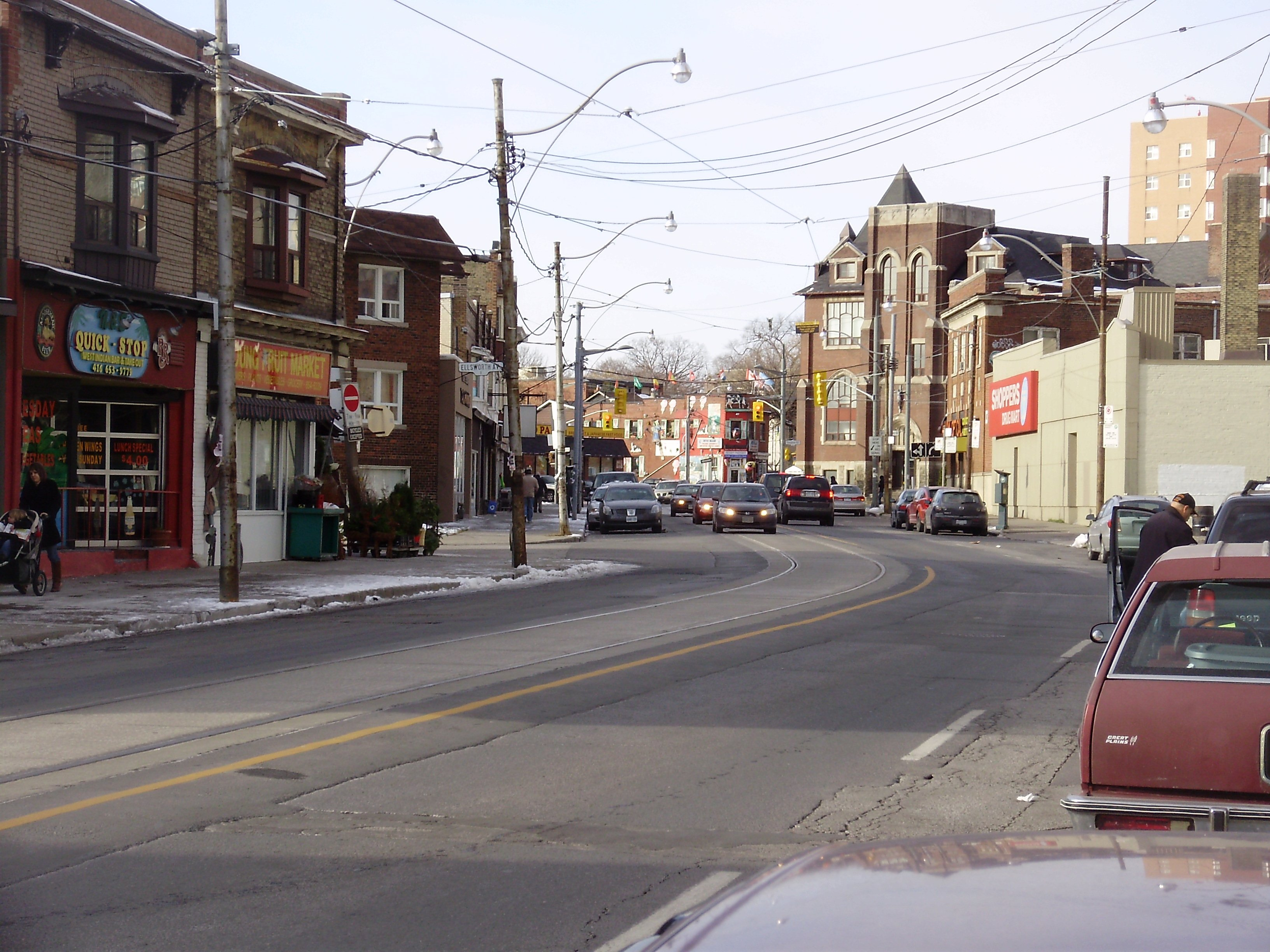
View of a commercial area in Bracondale Hill, from Vaughan Road and Ellsworth Avenue

The area is home to mostly large, early 20th century, single-family homes surrounding Hillcrest Park that overlook the city. Many multicultural restaurants and shops are located nearby on St. Clair West to the north, and on Davenport Road/Ossington Avenue to the southwest of the neighbourhood.

Its main commercial shopping area is along St. Clair Avenue. It has several main streets: Bathurst Street, a four-lane arterial road running north–south on the east; St. Clair Avenue, a four-lane arterial road, with streetcar right-of-way, on the north running east–west; and Davenport Road running east–west to the south.

In the eastern section at Bathurst and Davenport is the Wychwood Park enclave. From 1926 to 1967, a part of this area was represented by the Bracondale constituency in the Ontario Legislative Assembly.

== See also ==
- List of neighbourhoods in Toronto
