= Markland Wood =

- Neighbourhood
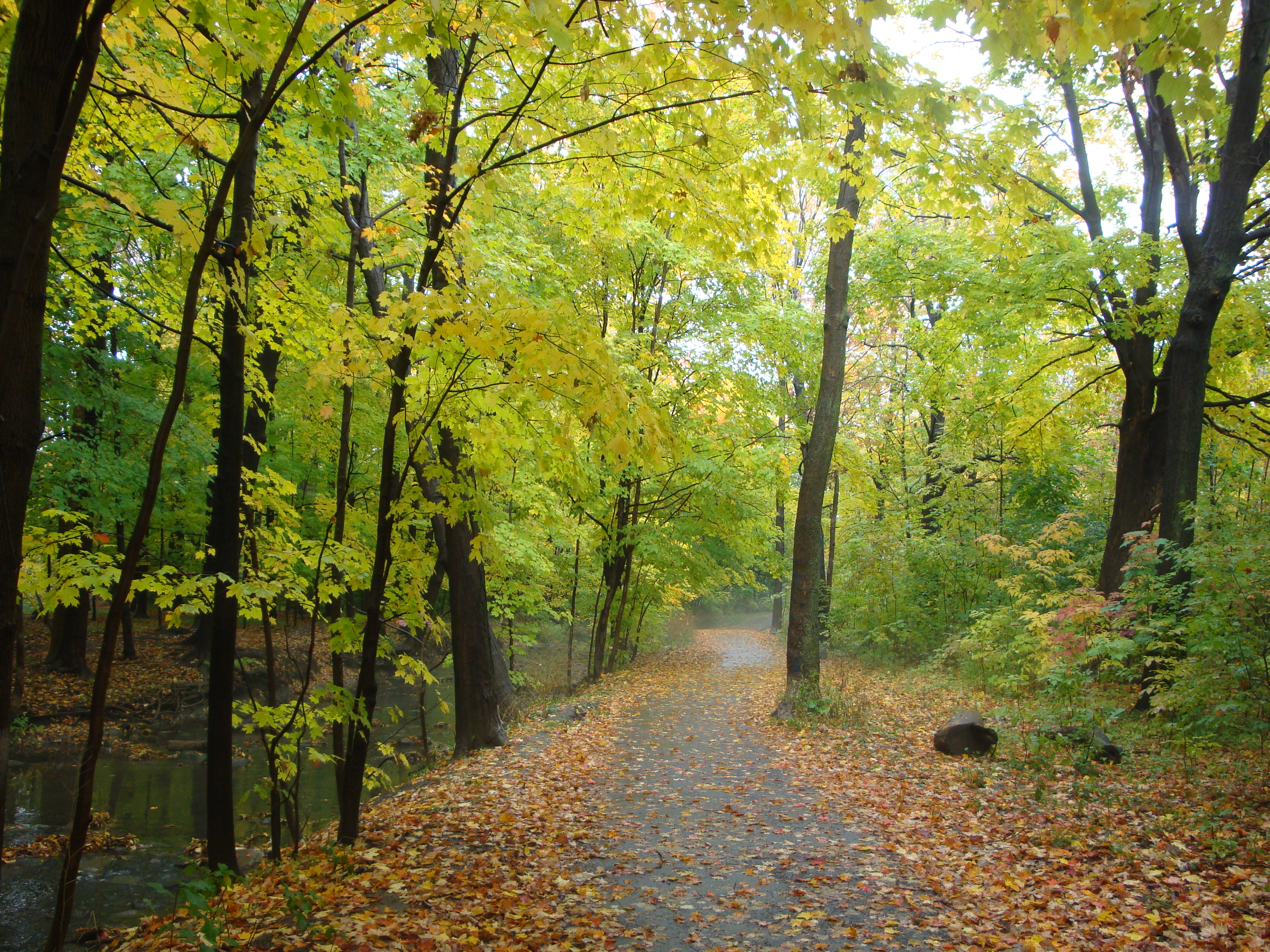
- Bloordale Park is a municipal park in Markland Wood

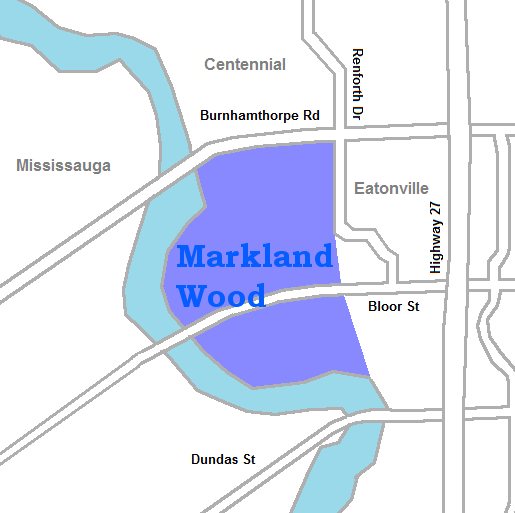
- Vicinity

- Location within Toronto
- Coordinates: 43°37′56″N 79°34′30″W
- Country: Canada
- Province: Ontario
- City: Toronto
- Community: Etobicoke-York
- Established: 1960 (Subdivision)
- Changed Municipality: 1998 Toronto from Etobicoke

Government
  - MP: Yvan Baker (Etobicoke Centre)
  - MPP: Kinga Surma (Etobicoke Centre)
  - Councillor: Stephen Holyday (Ward 2 Etobicoke Centre)

Markland Wood is a residential neighbourhood in Toronto, Ontario, Canada. It is located west of the central core, in the former suburb of Etobicoke and is the westernmost residential community in Toronto along Bloor Street West. It's located on the border of Mississauga and bounded by Etobicoke Creek to the west, Renforth Drive to the east, Burnhamthorpe to the North, and surrounded by the Markland Wood Golf Club; approximately 2/3 is north of Bloor Street, and 1/3 south. Markland Wood is part of the Etobicoke Centre riding for federal and provincial governments and Ward 2 for the municipal council.

== History ==
Markland Wood, or Mark's Land, was purchased by Mark Cavotti from the Silverthorn family in September 1958. Development started in 1960 after the Conservation Authority determined the high water mark levels after Hurricane Hazel. Most of the single family houses in Markland Wood were completed by 1967, but several custom-built homes were built around Markland Drive in the following years, as well as some tract housing at the north end of Thicket Rd. in 1971–1972. Two condominium apartment buildings were built along the west side of Mill Road, north of Markland Drive, in the mid- to late 1970s.

The Markland Wood Homeowners Association was formed in 1962 to "Create, Foster and Maintain the Community Spirit in Markland Wood". The MWHA publishes Marklander Newsletter the oldest, continuous running, community newspaper in Toronto. It was first published in 1962 and now has 10 annual issues delivered to MWHA members' households.

On October 22, 2007, a massive fire struck the neighbourhood. New townhouses being built at 4333 Bloor Street West at Mill Road caught fire, burning the new townhouses to the ground. No one was injured. The rebuilt collection of townhouses was again struck by fire March 8, 2008. This time around, only one townhouse was damaged. The Toronto Police Service are treating these incidents as "suspicious." In July 2008, St. Clement's Catholic Elementary School had a small fire on the side next to the townhouses around 2:00 in the morning.

In 2010/11 Markland Wood celebrated the 50 years anniversary. In 2011 the ratepayers association, Markland Homes Association changed their constitution and incorporated and is now called the Markland Wood Homeowners Association.

2012 marked the 50th anniversary of the association. At the AGM, Heritage Toronto presented the Historical Plaque to the Markland Wood community and the Silverthorn Family and Mill Farm, that now sits on the S.W. corner of Bloor Street W. and Mill Road.

== Culture ==
=== Events ===
- April – Annual Environmental Day Clean Up – Toronto Clean Up Day! Held in conjunction with the City of Toronto and includes the Markland Wood community and surrounding creeks, area schools, and parks.
- May – Annual Community Garage Sale – it is held on the last Saturday of the month, following Victoria Day
- May/June – Markland Wood Community Social. Held in May or June, at the Markland Wood Golf Course.
- September – Family Fun Day – Held at the Millwood Park or Millwood JS.
- December – Christmas Caravan & Food Drive – Held on the second Sunday of the month, before Christmas.

== Education ==
The schools within Markland Wood are governed by the Toronto District School Board and Toronto Catholic District School Board include:

- Millwood Junior School – English & French Immersion public elementary school for grades JK-5 students. It is located at 222 Mill Road and first opened in 1962.
- St. Clement Catholic School (grades JK-8)
- Bloordale Middle School – A middle school for grade 6-8 students. It is located at 10 Toledo Road. It was opened in 1960. The second part of the school was built in the 1970s.
- Silverthorn Collegiate Institute (grades 9-12) Feeder schools are: Millwood, Mill Valley, Eatonville, Briarcrest, Bloordale, and Bloorlea

Other Schools:

- St. Justin Catholic School (grades JK-8) – Located on Burnhamill Place that operated from 1975 until 1988. After demolition, the site sat empty until 2018, when it was redeveloped into luxury homes.
- The Mill Valley Junior School is a public elementary school, located just outside Markland Wood – on Mill Road, north of Burnhamthorpe, for grades JK-5 students.
- Eatonville Junior School is another public elementary school, located just east of Markland Wood on Rossburn Road, east of Renforth, for grades JK-5 students.

== Landmarks ==
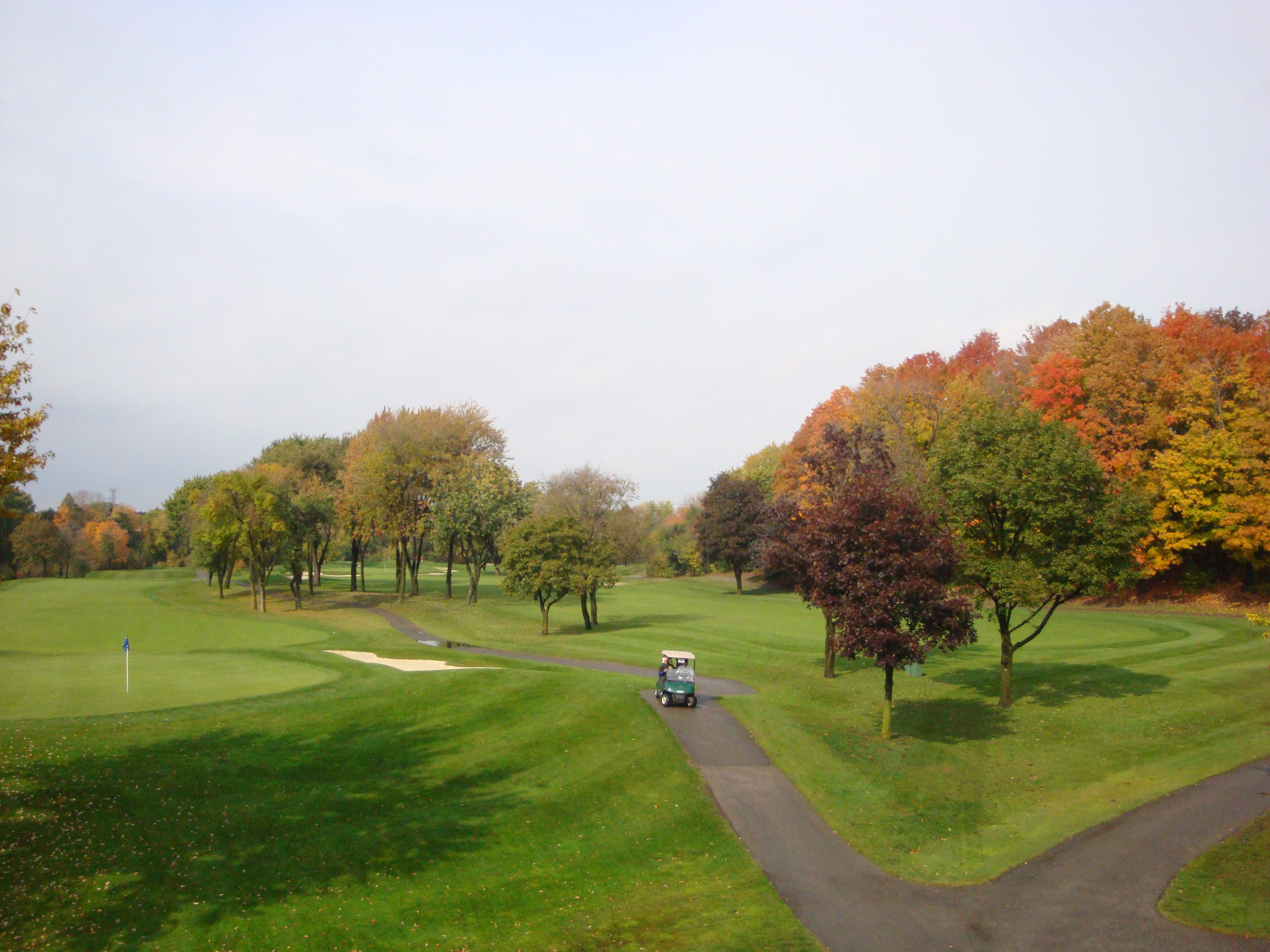
Markland Wood Golf Club is located within the neighbourhood

- Markland Wood Shopping Centre
- Markland Wood Medical Centre
- Markland Wood Golf Course
- Millwood Park – Old growth forest, playground, walking path with seating area, tennis courts & baseball diamonds
- Bloordale Park – Walking/Jogging/Cycling] path & children's play area. Path to Centennial Park
- Etobicoke Creek

=== Churches ===
- Bloordale United Church
- St Clement Roman Catholic Church
- Rehoboth Fellowship Christian Reformed Church

== See also ==
- List of neighbourhoods in Toronto
