= Thorncrest Village =

Coordinates: 43.6638°N 79.5383°W

- Neighbourhood
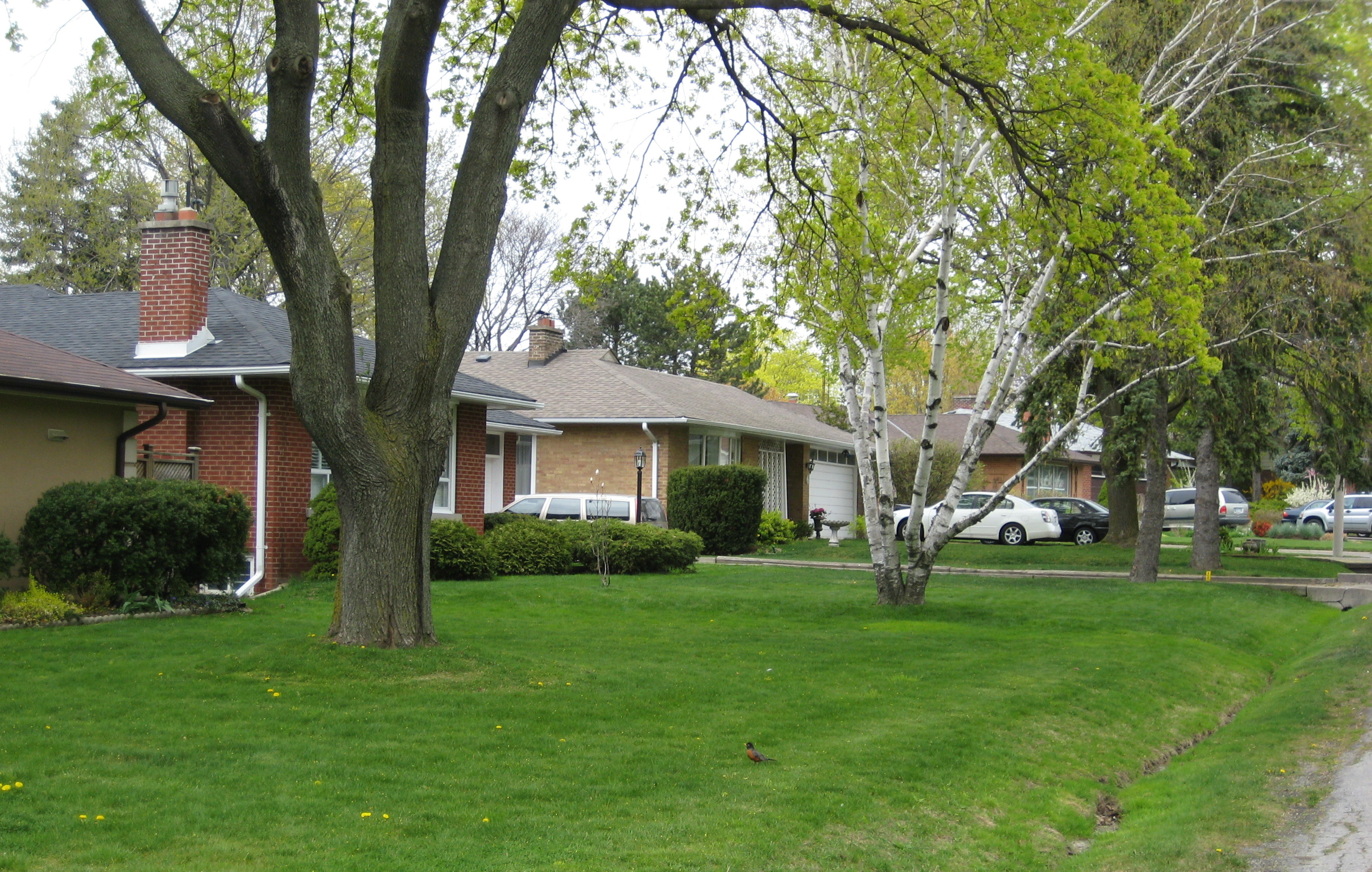

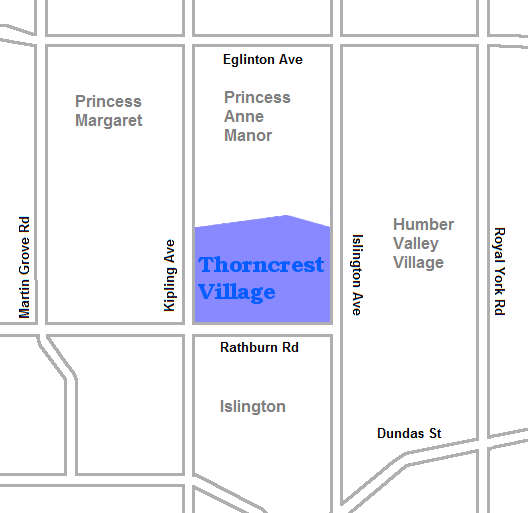
- Country: Canada
- Province: Ontario
- City: Toronto
- Community: Etobicoke-York
- Established: 1946 (Subdivision) 'Thorncrest'
- Changed Municipality: 1998 Toronto from Etobicoke

Government
  - MP: Yvan Baker (Etobicoke Centre)
  - MPP: Kinga Surma (Etobicoke Centre)
  - Councillor: Stephen Holyday (Ward 2)

Thorncrest Village is a neighbourhood in northwestern Toronto, Canada. It is a collection of tree-lined streets north of Rathburn Road, between Kipling and Islington avenues, in what used to be part of Etobicoke.

Designed by architect and town planner Eugene Faludi, the village was considered one of Toronto's first modern suburbs. Village residents own three parkettes and a park with a clubhouse, tennis courts, a swimming pool and a playground.

Thorncrest Village consists of 208 homes, on lots ranging from 0.5 acres (2,000 m^{2}) to 1-acre (4,000 m^{2}).

== See also ==
- List of neighbourhoods in Toronto
