= Parkwoods =

- Neighbourhood
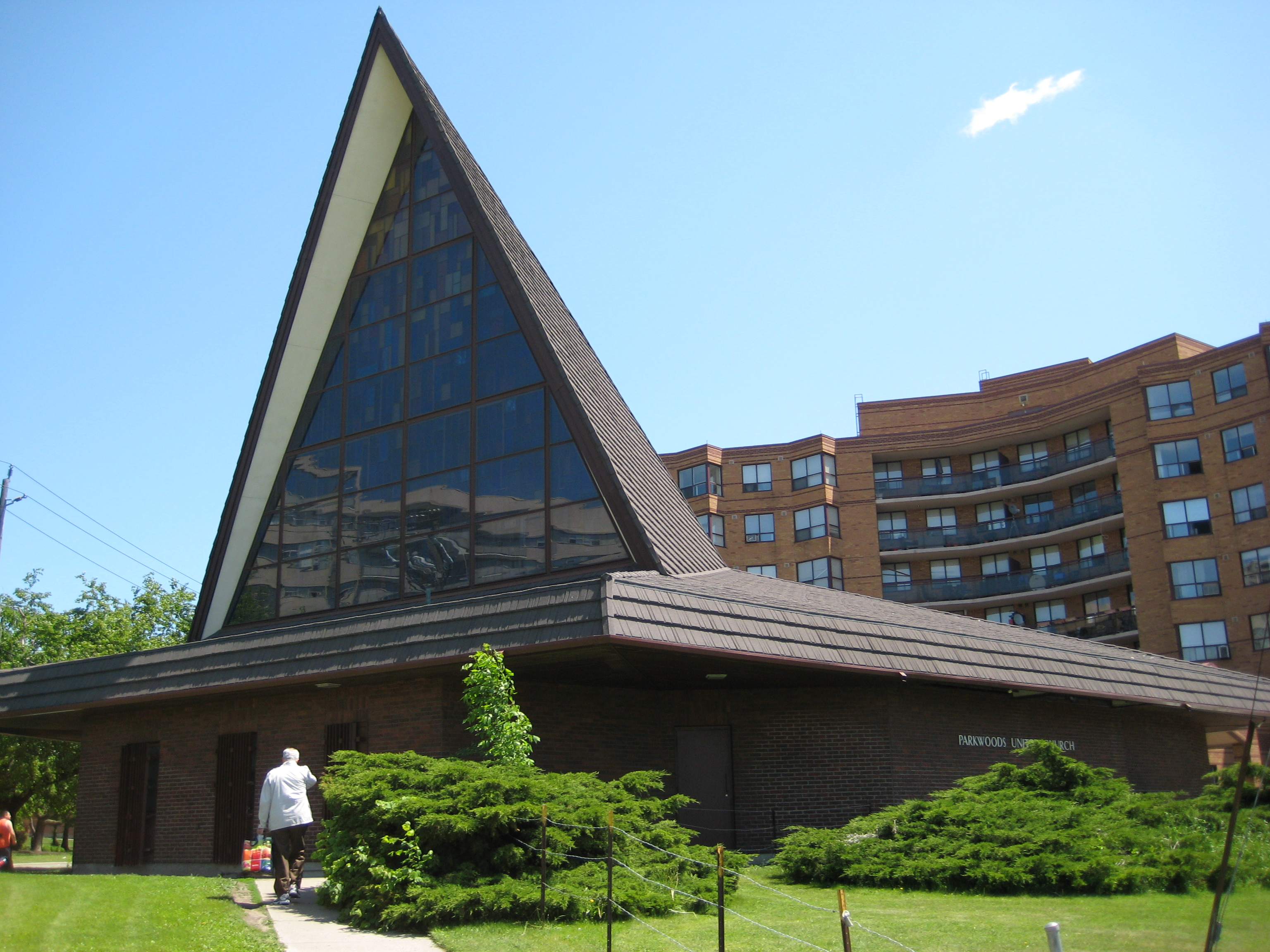
- Parkwoods United Church

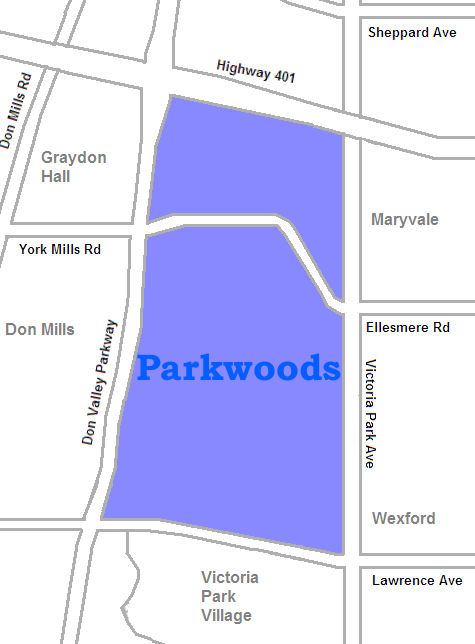

- Location within Toronto
- Coordinates: 43.751°N 79.323°W
- Country: Canada
- Province: Ontario
- City: Toronto
- Municipality established: 1850 York Township
- Changed municipality: 1922 North York from York Township
- Changed municipality: 1998 Toronto from North York

Government
  - MP: Salma Zahid (Scarborough Centre—Don Valley East)
  - MPP: Adil Shamji (Don Valley East)
  - Councillor: Jon Burnside (Ward 16 Don Valley East)

Area
  - Total: 4.72 km^{2} (1.82 sq mi)

Parkwoods or sometimes referred to as Parkwoods-Donalda, is a neighbourhood in Toronto, Ontario, Canada. It is a geographically large neighbourhood located just south of Ontario Highway 401, west of Victoria Park Avenue, north of Lawrence Avenue East and east of the Don Valley Parkway.

== Characteristics ==
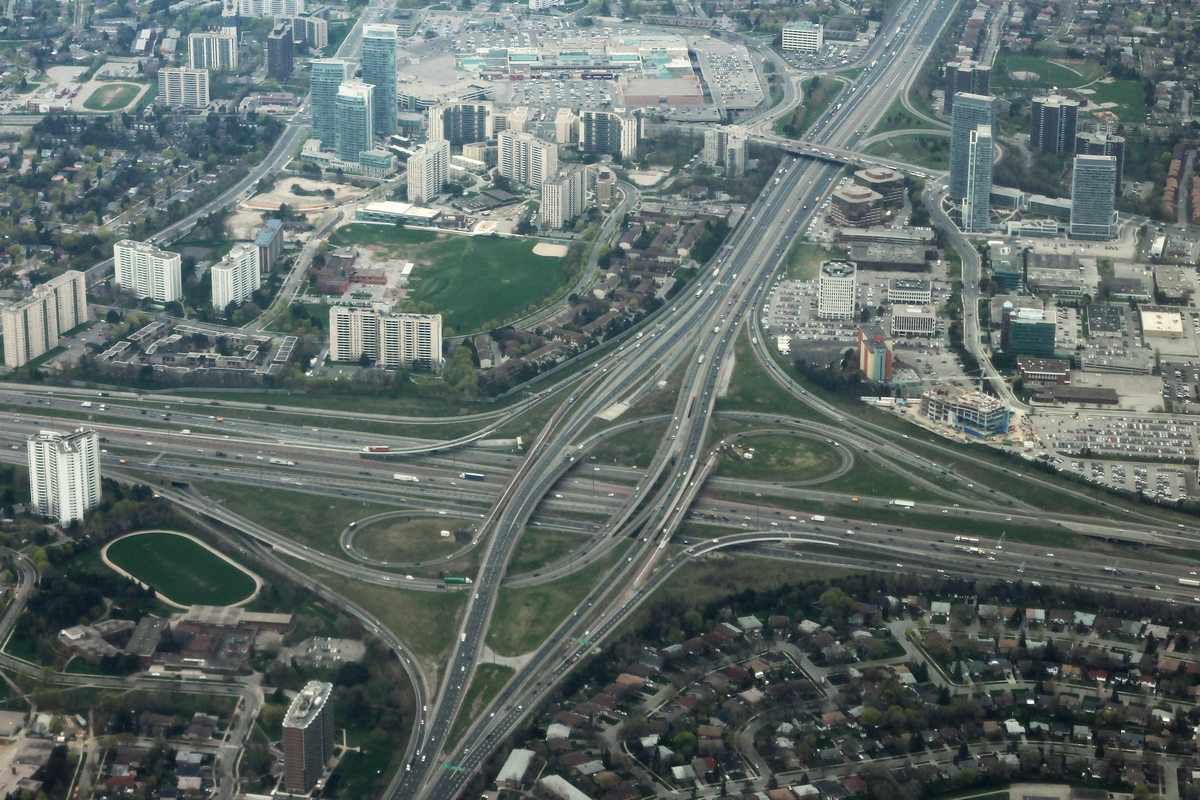
The interchange for the Don Valley Parkway and Highway 401. Parkwoods is visible at the bottom right, bounded by highways to the north, and west.

The northern part of the neighbourhood (area north of York Mills Road/Parkwoods Village Drive) is populated by mostly new immigrants to the city and has a mix of lower- and middle-income families. As a result, there are many visible minorities (over 50%). Chinese, South Asians and Blacks (African, Caribbean) make up the largest percentage of ancestries in the area, after European Canadians and other mixes. The area south of York Mills Road is a fairly affluent neighbourhood, with many original homeowners (1957 to 1962 purchasers) still occupants (or their heirs).

In the north-west quadrant of the neighbourhood is the area known as Graydon, which is built up on hillside terrains and is home to the Donalda Golf course.

One of the dominant characteristics of the neighbourhood is its winding streets and undulating topography. Several large parks and trails can be found throughout the area. Of particular note is Brookbanks Park; a branch of the Don Valley ravine system. Running throughout the ravine is Deerlick Creek, which is a tributary of the Don River.

== History ==
In the late '80s and early '90s, Dr. Mima Kapches of the Royal Ontario Museum conducted a variety of archaeological digs in some of the backyards that line the Brookbanks Park ravine. During a dig in the fall of 1987 she uncovered a Meadowood-cache blade dating from 1000 BC, making it one of the oldest ever discovered. Continued excavation the following year uncovered a variety of Middle Archaic period artifacts, including a small pebble that displayed a human face in effigy, believed to have been created in 4,700 B.C. making it one of the oldest dated human representations in northeastern North America. From 1988 to 1990, digs in an adjacent backyard revealed a wealth of Early Iroquoian pottery (ca. AD 1000), as well as the remnants of an "open-pit firing event," a site that would have been used in its production. These discoveries have led local archaeologists to hypothesize that the ravine surrounding Deerlick Creek may have once served as a seasonal pottery production and firing campsite."

== Education ==
Three public school boards operate schools in Parkwoods, Conseil scolaire catholique MonAvenir (CSCM), the Toronto Catholic District School Board (TCDSB), and the Toronto District School Board (TDSB). TDSB is an English first language secular school board. CSCM and TCDSB are separate school boards, the former being a French first language school board, the latter being an English first language school board.

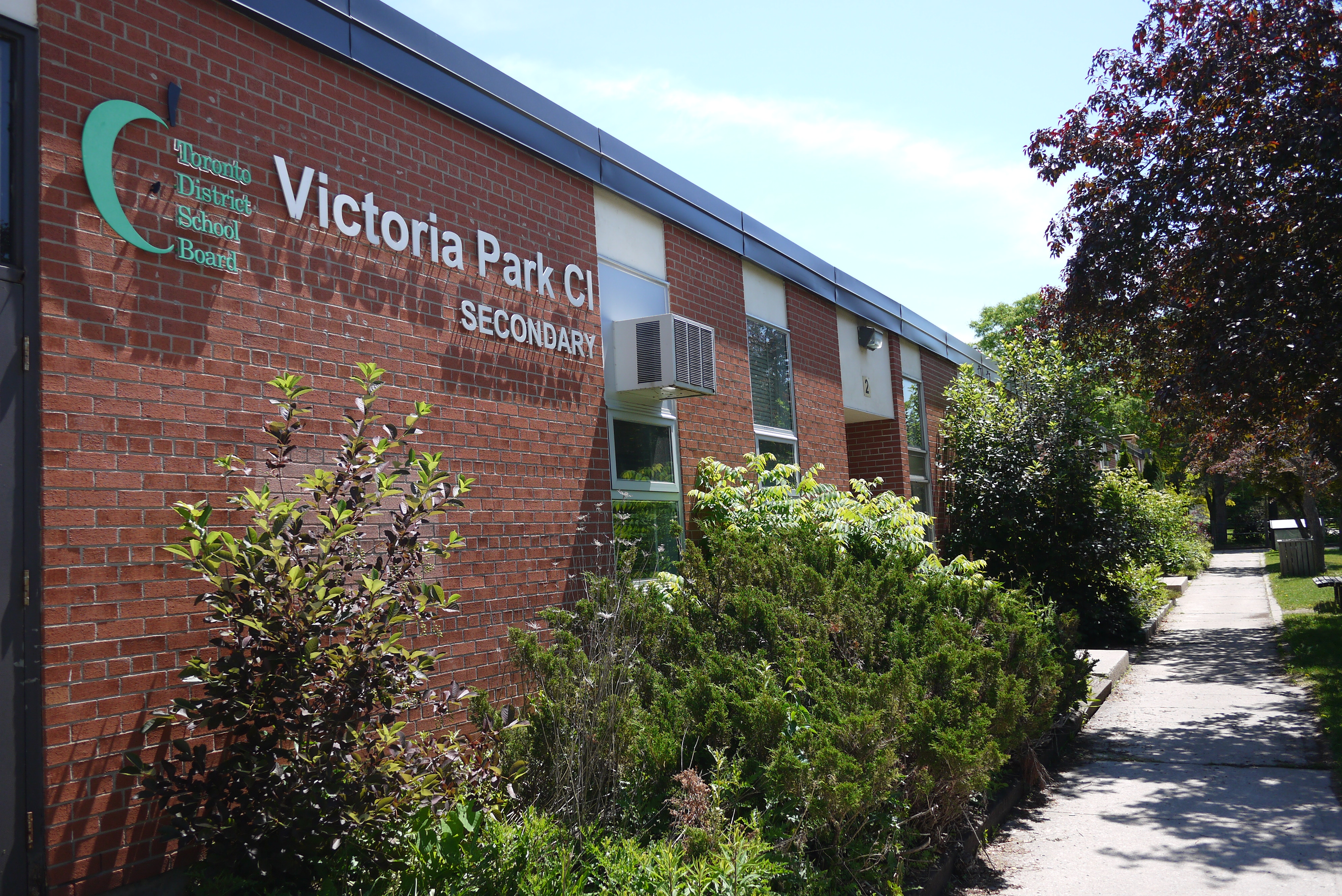
Victoria Park Collegiate Institute is a secondary school situated in Parkwoods.

TDSB operates several schools in the area, including one public secondary school in Parkwoods, Victoria Park Collegiate Institute. In addition to Victoria Park, TDSB operates eight elementary schools throughout the neighbourhood. They include:

- Donview Middle School
- Milne Valley Middle School
- Fenside Public School
- Three Valleys Public School
- Roywood Public School
- Cassandra Public School
- Ranchdale Public School
- Broadlands Public School

CSCM operates one public elementary school in the Parkwoods, École élémentaire catholique Sainte-Madeleine.

TCDSB operates several schools in the area, including one public secondary school in the neighbourhood, Senator O'Connor College School. Established in 1963, the secondary school was originally located at 5 Avonwick Gate, before relocating to its present location on 60 Rowena Drive. In addition to Senator O'Connor, TCDSB also operates three public elementary schools. They include:

- Annunciation Catholic School
- St. Catherine Elementary School
- St. Isaac Jogues Catholic School

In addition to public schools, Parkwoods is also home to a private school, Crestwood Preparatory College. The school is an independent secondary school located at 217 Brookbanks Drive. It was formerly called Brookbanks Public School.
