= Chaplin Estates =

Coordinates: 43.70°N 79.40°W

- Neighbourhood
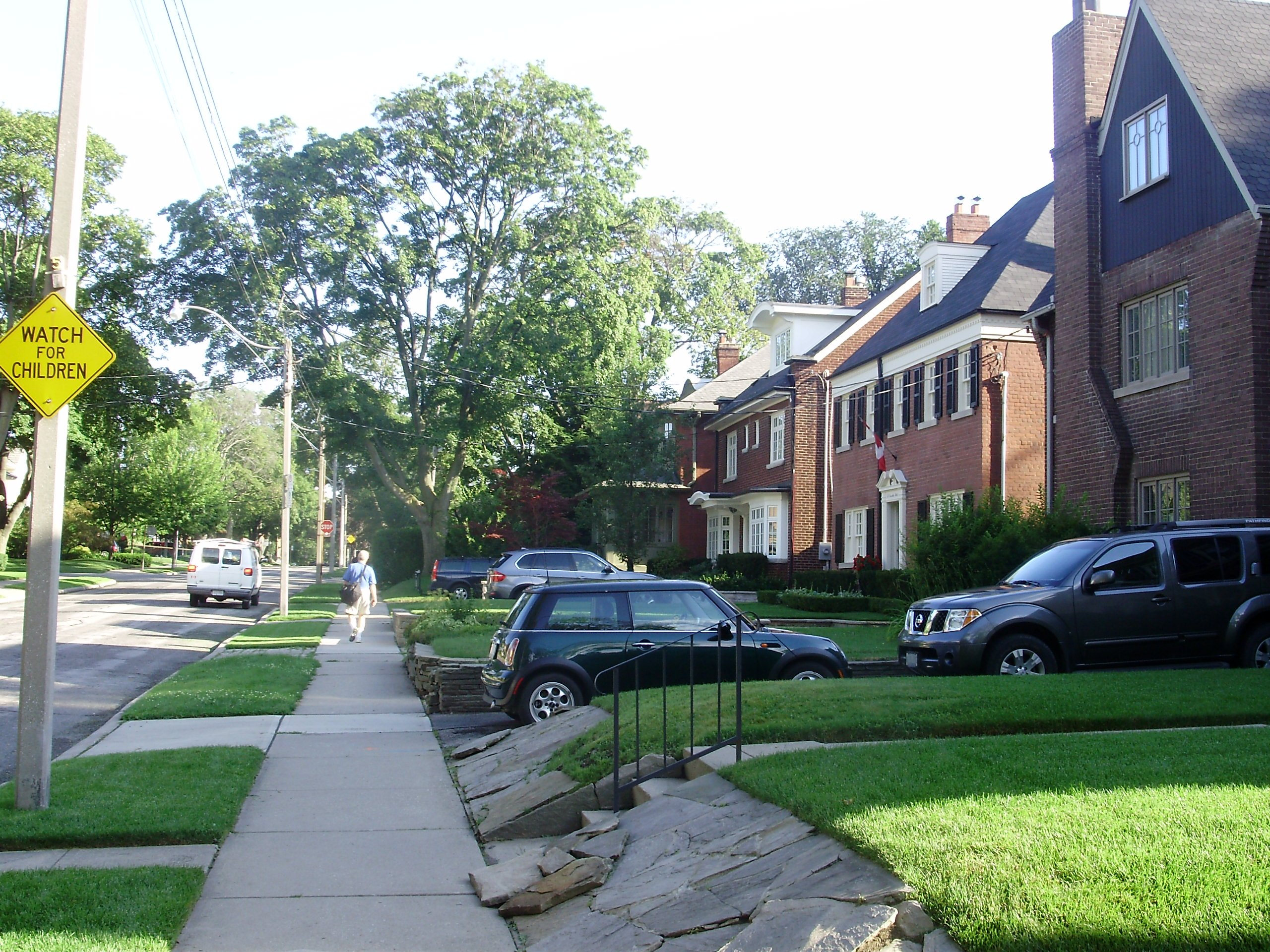
- Lascelles Boulevard in Chaplin Estates

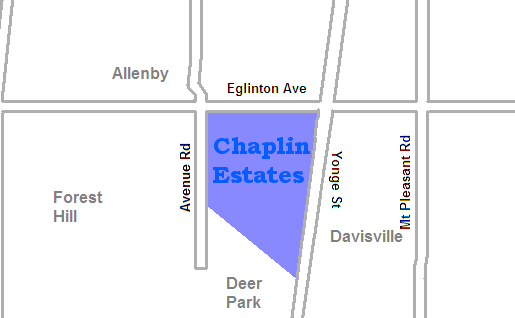
- Country: Canada
- Province: Ontario
- City: Toronto

Chaplin Estates is a neighbourhood that covers the southwest portion of the Yonge and Eglinton area in Toronto, Ontario, Canada. It lies west of Yonge Street and is bounded by Eglinton Avenue to the north and Avenue Road to the west. The southern boundary is Chaplin Crescent, which runs parallel to the former Beltline Railway line, now the Beltline Trail, a scenic walking and biking trail.

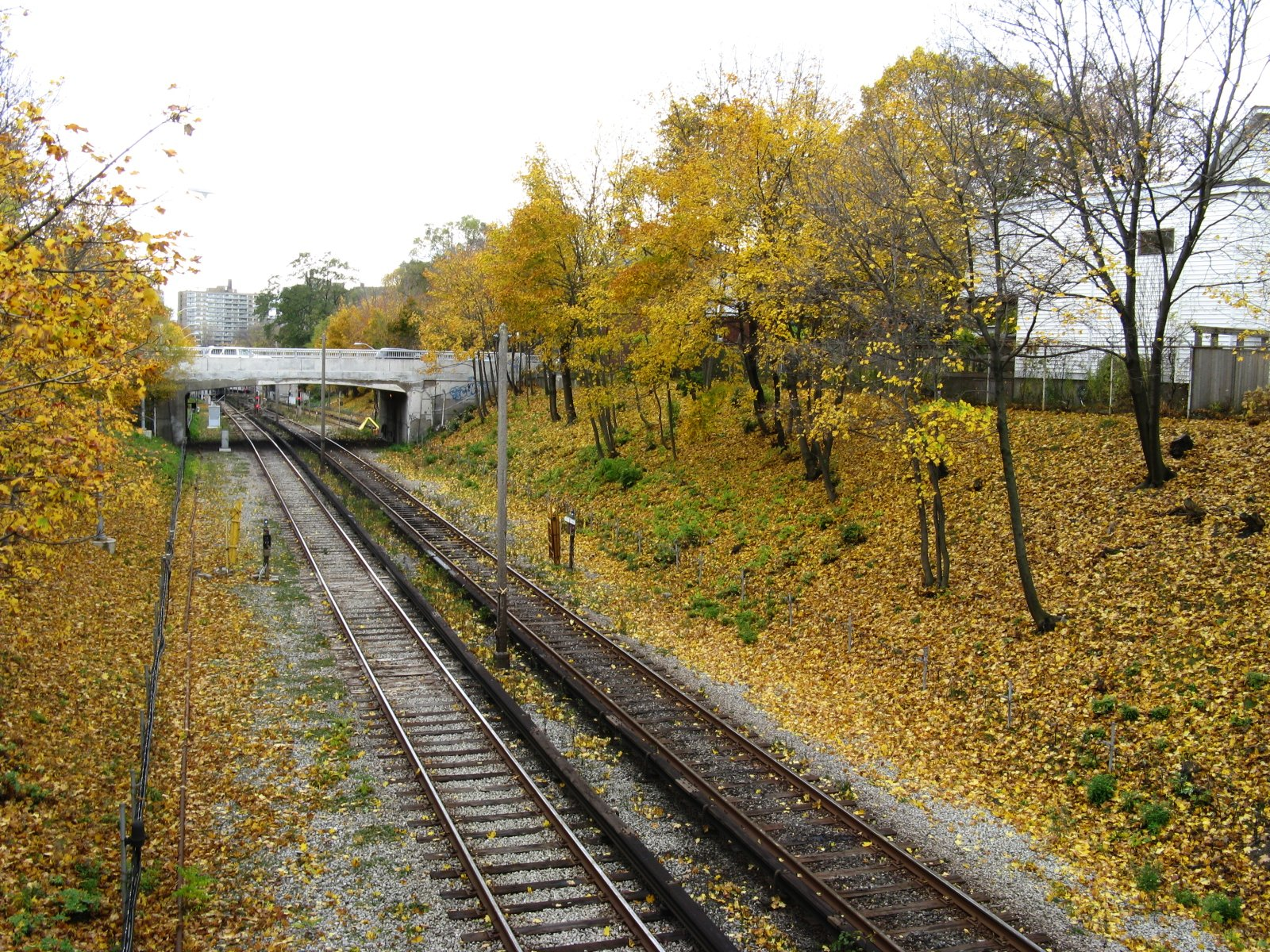
Southwest view of Chaplin Estates near Lola Road and Yonge Street. The bridge overlooks the Line 1 Yonge-University subway line, which has two stops in the area.

A portion of the Toronto Transit Commission's Yonge-University-Spadina subway line runs above ground along the eastern fringe of Chaplin Estates, and transit access is provided through Davisville station and Eglinton station. Chaplin Estates is one of the wealthiest neighbourhoods in Toronto.
