= Wanless Park =

Coordinates: 43.729°N 79.392°W

- Neighbourhood
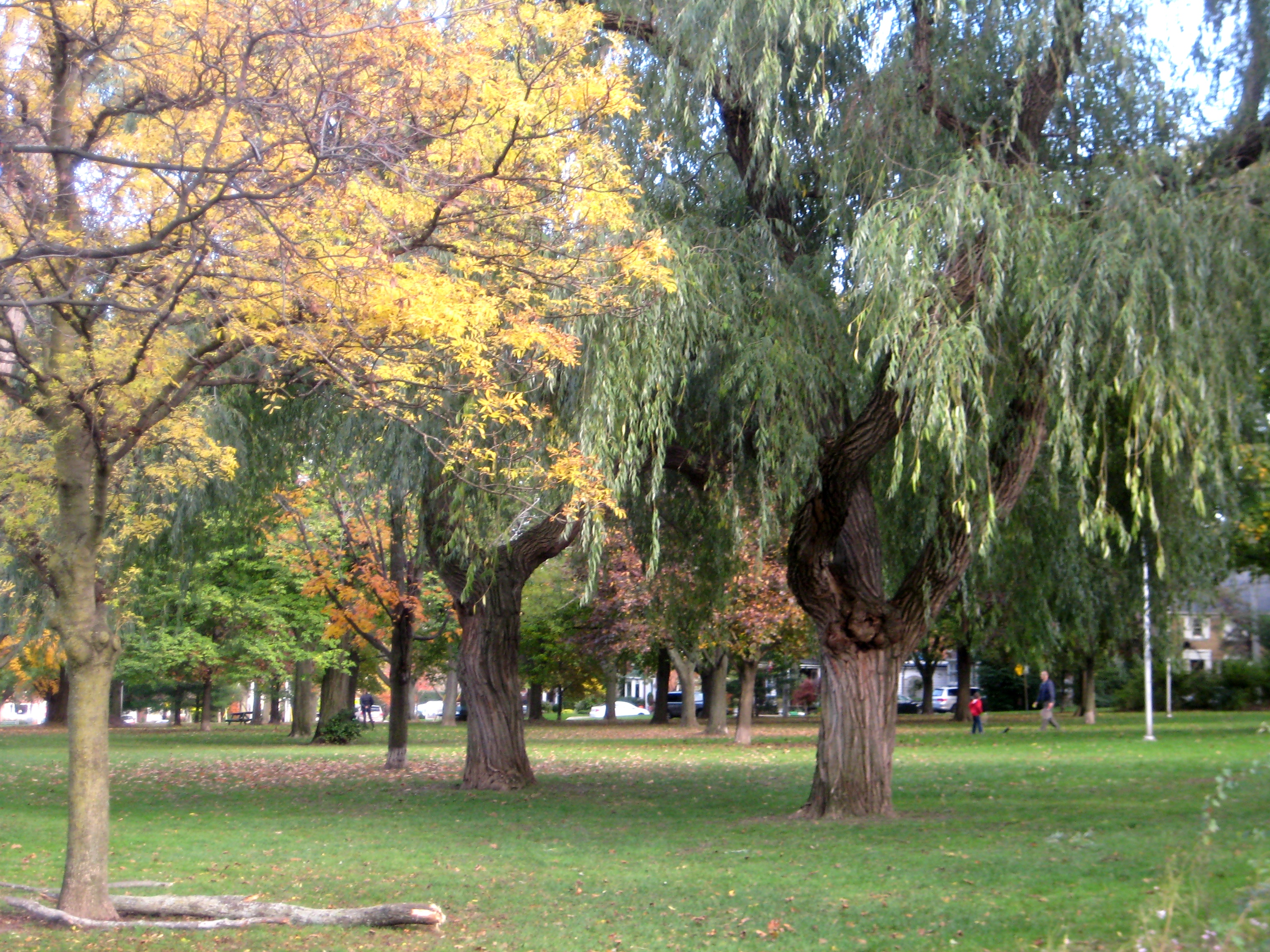
- The park the neighbourhood is named for

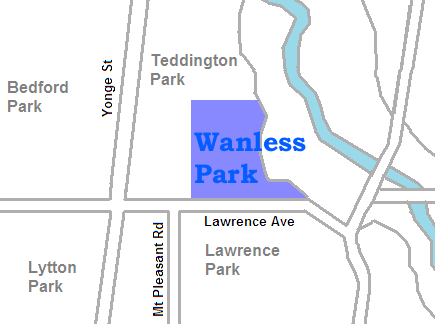
- Country: Canada
- Province: Ontario
- City: Toronto

Wanless Park is a neighbourhood and park in North Toronto, Ontario, Canada. It is located just north of Lawrence Avenue, between Bayview Avenue and Ronan Avenue.

Central to the Wanless Park neighbourhood is a public park called Wanless Park. The park is approximately 9.5 acres (38,000 m^{2}), with tennis courts, a basketball court, playground, a wading pool with a lifeguard, baseball diamond and grass fields. During the summer, camps and Ultimate tournaments occupy much of the grassy field area.

== History ==
The land upon which Wanless Park sits was originally Waverley Farm. In 1912, Toronto Suburbs Ltd., guided by George Kappele and D.F. Crowagen registered a plan of subdivision for the old Waverley farm at Mount Pleasant Road and Lawrence Avenue. The developers named this new subdivision Waverley Park. The building of homes in Waverley Park was interrupted by the First World War and the Depression.

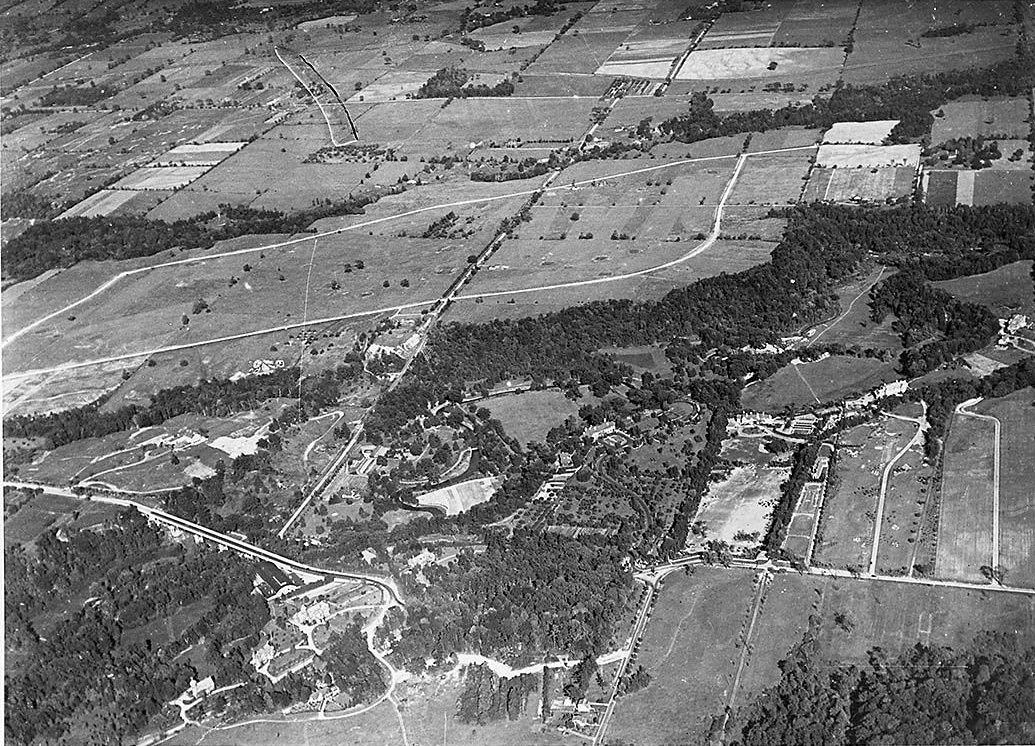
View of the area around Bayview and Lawrence Avenue (c. 1930). Present-day Wanless Park is located on the left of the image.

On March 23, 1931 the City of Toronto expropriated land in the center of Waverley Park for the creation of a public park and issued an order to expropriate all lands: “lying north of Wanless Avenue and Wanless Crescent, west of Dundee Place (now Braeside Road), east of Kappelle Avenue and south of Ranleigh Avenue” (which is now Haslemere Road). This plan passed through Council on June 15, 1931 and Wanless Park was born. Wanless Park, and several like street names are named after John Wanless, a Toronto municipal alderman and educator.

In the centre of the park, there is a club house which houses Wanless Tennis Club and washrooms. The tennis club has a long history, tennis courts were built in 1950, and an organized tennis club started in 1952 and has been running ever since. In 2002, the tennis courts were completely rebuilt and widened. In 2014 Wanless Tennis was given stewardship over the complete field house by the city, and in return planned and funded an extensive renovation to provide a much improved and functional clubhouse for the members.

Every April, an annual "Clean Up the Park Day" is organized. The people of Wanless Park help clean up garbage and other assorted matter. Coffee, tea and juice are made available for the volunteers. Many of the trees planted in Wanless Park have been donated by the nearby residents, often in memory of loved ones. Donated trees typically have a plaque in front of them.

== See also ==
- Sir William James Wanless, medical doctor and missionary to India
