= Uptown Toronto =

Human settlement in Ontario, Canada

Coordinates: 43.7264°N 79.4028°W

Uptown Toronto is an area in Toronto, Ontario, Canada that is considered to be north of Midtown Toronto.

== History ==
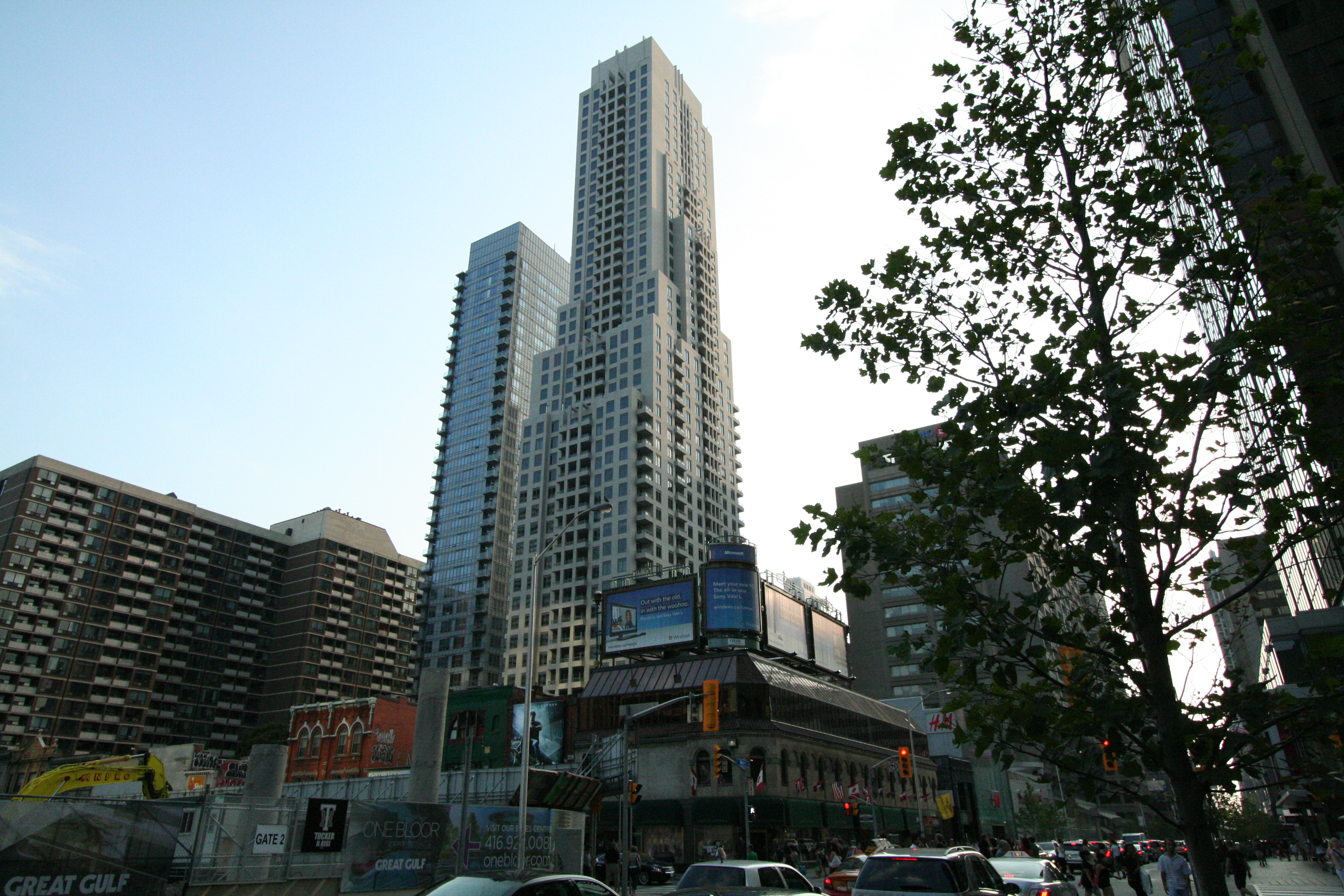
Uptown Residence

"Uptown" has traditionally been a name given to the area north of Downtown Toronto. As the portion of the city that could be considered to be downtown or midtown has grown, the region has pushed further north along Yonge Street.

The first area known as Uptown was centered on Bloor Street around the University of Toronto. In the nineteenth century, this was the northern fringe of the city; when the university was established it was still largely rural. The neighborhood that grew up in this area in the late nineteenth and early twentieth century became known as Uptown. While this name is no longer used, it was preserved in some institutions, such as the Uptown Residences, a condo on the site of the former Uptown Theatre.

Most areas north of Bloor have been referred to as Uptown. Today the area most often refers to the northern portion of the old city of Toronto stretching from St. Clair Avenue to Lawrence Avenue. There is no official city of Toronto definition for Uptown, but the Uptown Yonge Business Improvement area stretches from Eglinton to Lawrence, though today, with the amalgamated city, the North York City Centre, along Yonge Street, an area dense with highrises, could best be described as Uptown.

== See also ==
List of tallest structures in Canada
