= Ledbury Park =

Coordinates: 43.729°N 79.424°W

- Neighbourhood
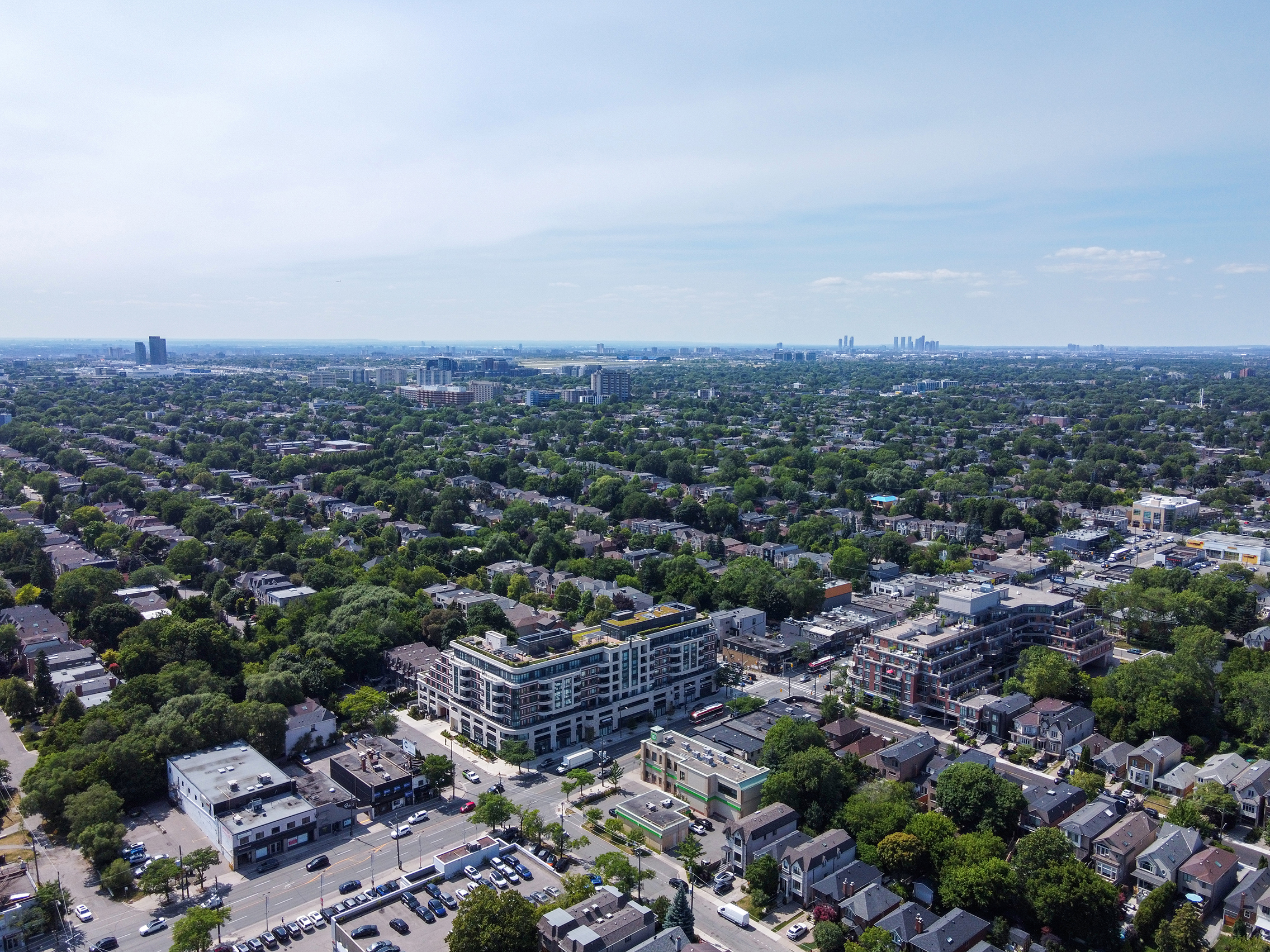
- Aerial view of Ledbury Park near Avenue Road, Toronto(2025)

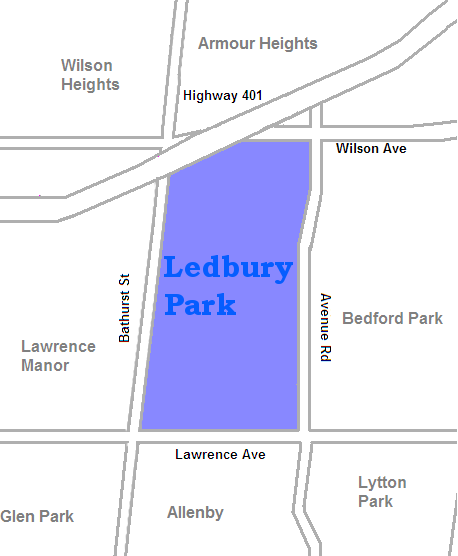
- Country: Canada
- Province: Ontario
- City: Toronto

Ledbury Park is a neighbourhood in Toronto, Ontario, Canada. It is located in the southern part of the North York area, just across the border from Midtown Toronto. Its boundaries are Avenue Road to the east, Lawrence Avenue to the south, Bathurst Street to the West, and Wilson Avenue and Highway 401 to the north.

The western boundary of Ledbury Park along Bathurst Street is a predominantly Jewish neighbourhood as many moved from downtown Toronto after World War II.

== History ==
The area was settled by farmers in the 19th century. In 1918, most of the land was owned by real estate developers, who began to sell lots on the site. Lawyer-developer and President of Melrose Realty Company Herbert Abraham Clark (and Melrose co-founder Sir William Mulock) named a number of the new streets, such as Marmion, Deloraine, Melrose and Falkirk, after the works of Sir Walter Scott. It was not until after the Second World War that most of the area was developed. The area was filled with small post-war bungalows and became a middle-class suburban area with easy access to Highway 401.

The character of the neighbourhood began to change rapidly beginning in the 1990s. Ledbury Park is adjacent to Lawrence Park, one of Toronto's more upscale neighbourhoods. Ledbury Park began to be redeveloped in its image, as many of the 1950s bungalows were demolished and replaced with much larger based structures.

== Education ==
Two public school boards operate primary education institutions in Ledbury Park, the separate Toronto Catholic District School Board (TCDSB), and the secular Toronto District School Board (TDSB). TCDSB operates St. Margaret Catholic School, whereas TDSB operates Ledbury Park Elementary and Middle School.

Neither school board operates a secondary school in the neighbourhood, with TCDSB and TDSB secondary school students residing in Ledbury Park attending institutions in adjacent neighbourhoods. The French first language public secular school board, Conseil scolaire Viamonde, and it separate counterpart, Conseil scolaire catholique MonAvenir also offer schooling to applicable residents of Ledbury Park, although they do not operate a school in the neighbourhood. CSCM and CSV students attend schools situated in other neighbourhoods in Toronto.

== Recreation ==
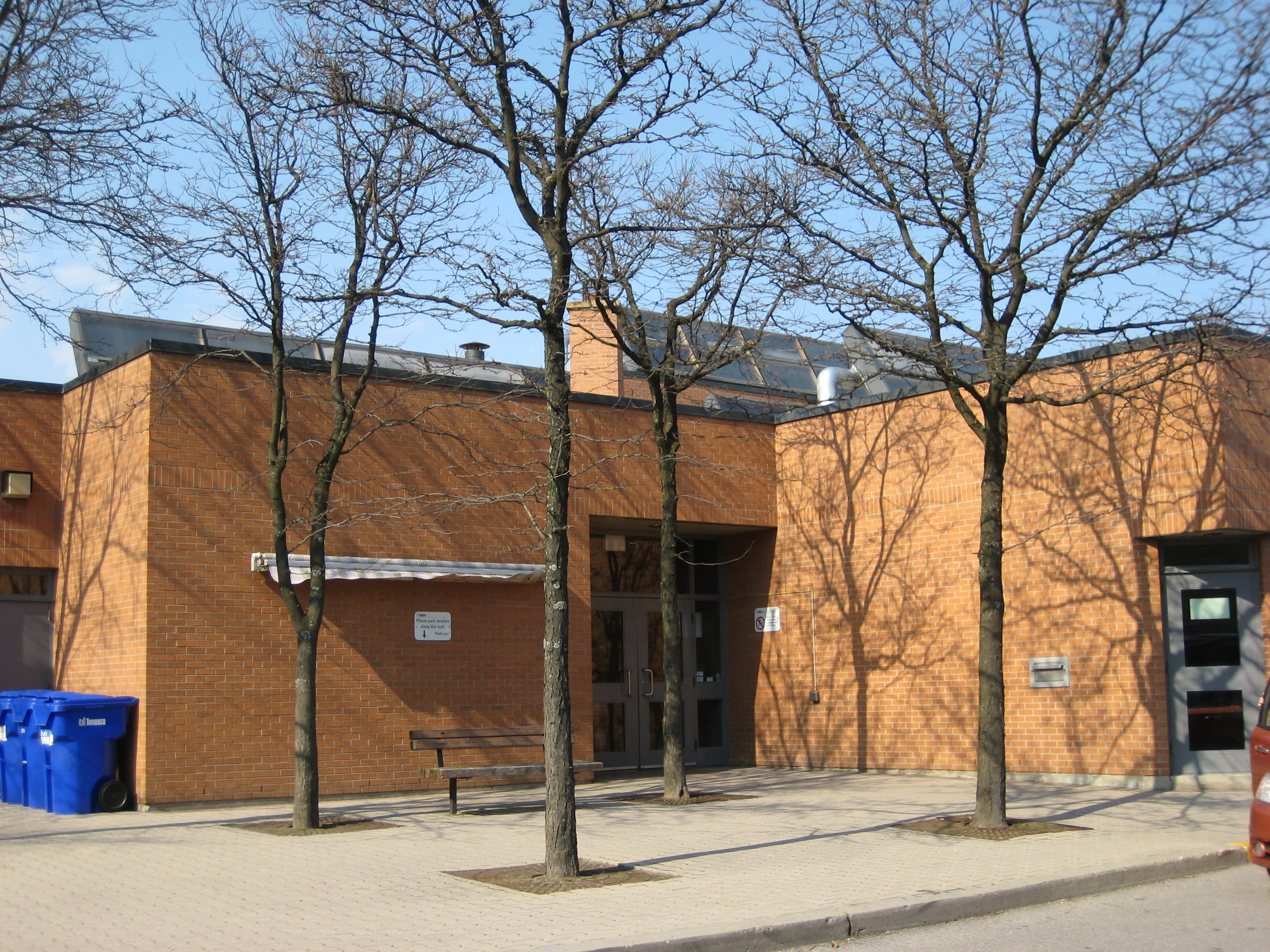
The Armour Heights branch of the Toronto Public Library is situated in Ledbury Park

Several municipal parks are located in Ledbury Park including Bathurst-Wilson Parkette, Bedford Parkette, Brookdale Park, Grey Parkette, Ledbury Park, Old Orchard Park, and Woburn Park. Ledbury Park contains a skating rink in winter and a swimming pool in the summer. Municipal parks in the neighbourhood are managed by the Toronto Parks, Forestry and Recreation Division. The division also manages one community centre in the northeast of the neighbourhood, Armour Heights Community Centre. The Armour Heights branch of the Toronto Public Library is also situated in the neighbourhood, next to the community centre.

== Transportation ==
The neighbourhood is bounded by several major roadways, Avenue Road to the east, Lawrence Avenue to the south, and Bathurst Street to the west. Portions of Highway 401, a controlled access highway, passes through the northwest portion of the neighbourhood. Public transportation is provided by several Toronto Transit Commission's bus routes.
