= Hillcrest Village =

Coordinates: 43.800°N 79.359°W

- Neighbourhood
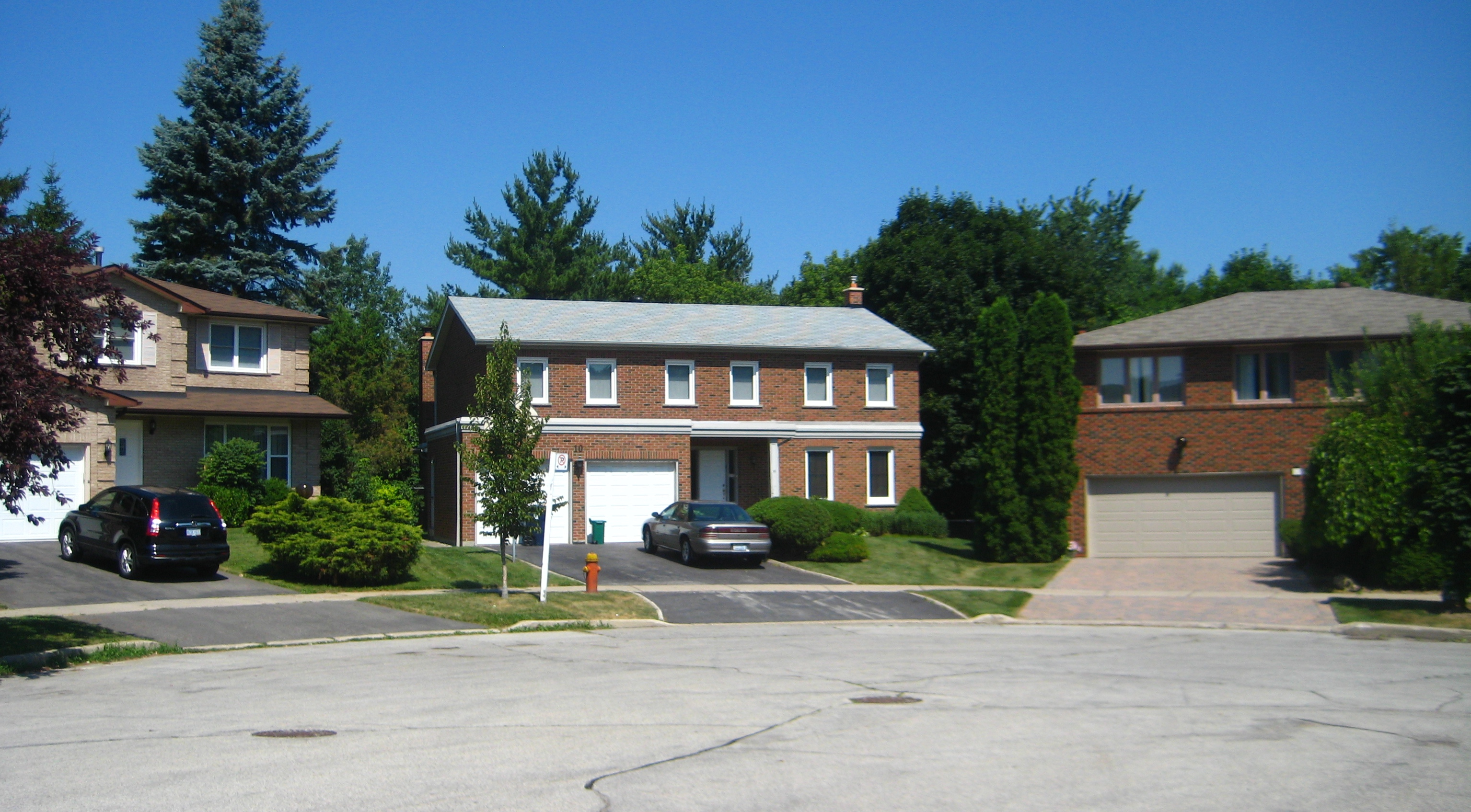

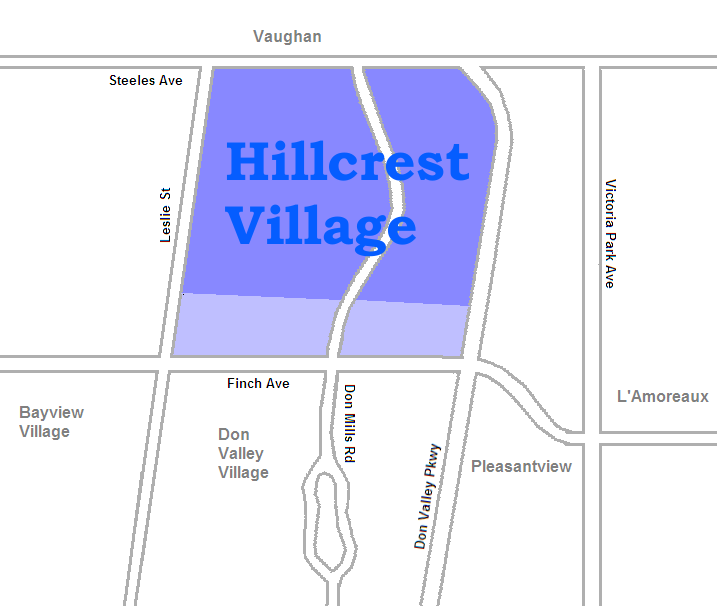
- Country: Canada
- Province: Ontario
- City: Toronto
- Municipality established: 1850 York Township
- Changed municipality: 1922 North York from York Township
- Changed municipality: 1998 Toronto from North York

Hillcrest Village is a neighbourhood located in Toronto, Ontario, Canada. It is located in the northern district of North York. It is bordered by Finch to the South, Leslie Street to the West, Steeles to the North and Victoria Park to the East. Both neighbourhoods share the Don Valley as a point of reference in the Eastern border of the neighbourhoods.

The Don valley provides a hillside landscape in the east end of the neighbourhood. In conjunction with Duncan Creek and numerous parks the area has some natural splendour.

== Demographics ==
Hillcrest Village is home to one of Toronto's most popular Chinese areas. The top ethnicity in the area is by far Chinese and most recent immigrants to the area continue to arrive from China, Hong Kong and Korea. While there is social housing in the area and a large percentage of residents earning low incomes, many residents earn incomes in the top tax brackets. The 75%+ home ownership rate is another indicator of affluence in the area.

For comparison reasons, one of the census tracks within Hillcrest has roughly 64% of immigrant, 34% non-immigrant, and 2% non-permanent residents in the 2011 National Household survey. With a small increase in immigrant numbers from 2006, it is quite unnoticeable considering the large number of residents within Hillcrest Village.

== Education ==
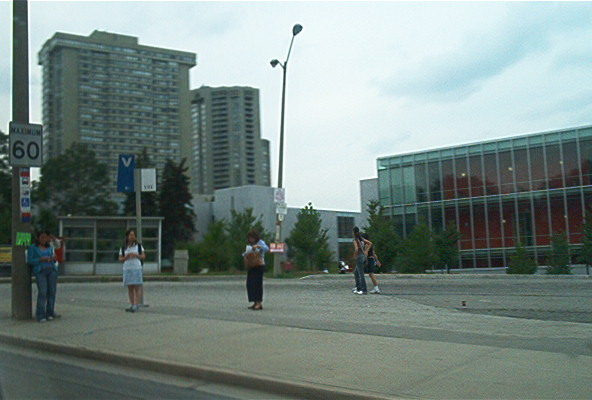
View of Seneca College's Newham Campus, a college situated in Hillcrest Village.

Three public school boards operate schools in Hillcrest Village. The Toronto Catholic District School Board (TCDSB) is a separate public school board, whereas Conseil scolaire Viamonde (CSV) and Toronto District School Board (TDSB) are secular public school boards, the former being French first language school board, and the latter being English first language school board. Elementary schools in Hillcrest Village that are operated by the aforementioned school boards includes:

- Arbor Glen Public School (TDSB)
- Cliffwood Public School (TDSB)
- Cherokee Public School (TDSB)
- Cresthaven Public School (TDSB)
- École élémentaire Paul-Demers (CSV)
- Highland Middle School (TDSB)
- Hillmount Public School (TDSB)
- Our Lady of Mount Carmel Catholic School (TCDSB)

TDSB is presently the only public school board to operate a secondary school in the neighbourhood, A. Y. Jackson Secondary School.

In addition to primary and secondary institutions, Hillcrest Village is also home to Seneca College's Newham Campus. Seneca is a public post-secondary institution. In addition to its campus in Hillcrest Village, the college also has campuses throughout Greater Toronto.

== Transportation ==
The Toronto Transit Commission provides public transportation for the area. The TTC operates several bus routes through the neighbourhood, including the 42 Cummer, 53 Steeles East, 51 Leslie, 25 Don Mills, 39 Finch East, and 24 Victoria Park bus routes. In addition to the TTC, York Region Transit buses also along Don Mills Road en route to York Region, primarily serving Seneca College's Newnham Campus.
