= Italian Canadians in the Greater Toronto Area =

Ethnic group in Toronto, Canada

Italo-Canadiens (French) italocanadesi (Italian)
- Italian Canadians as a percent of population by census subdivision

Total population
- 468,970 (total population); 89,380 (by birth); 379,590 (by ancestry); 2021 Census; 7.1% of Greater Toronto Area's population.

Regions with significant populations
- Toronto, York Region (Vaughan, Richmond Hill, King), Peel Region (Mississauga, Brampton, Caledon), Halton Region (Oakville, Burlington), Durham Region (Oshawa)

Languages
- Canadian English; Canadian French; Italian; Italian dialects; Calabrese; Faetar; Neapolitan; Sicilian

Religion
- Predominately Roman Catholicism

Related ethnic groups
- Other Italians, Sicilian Americans, Corsican Americans

Toronto has a large Italian Canadian community, with 30.3 per cent of the ethnic Italians in Canada living in the Greater Toronto Area (GTA) as of 2021. Toronto is home to the fourth largest population of people of Italian descent after Buenos Aires, São Paulo and New York City, respectively. As of the Canada 2021 Census, there were 468,970 Italian Canadians located in the Greater Toronto Area, with 444,755 located within the Toronto CMA. (Note: Unlike the Greater Toronto Area, the Toronto CMA does not include the Halton municipality of Burlington, and some Durham municipalities, those being Scugog and Brock, as well as those within the Oshawa CMA (Oshawa, Whitby, and Clarington). It does, however, include some municipalities outside the Greater Toronto Area, those being the Dufferin County municipalities of Mono and Orangeville, and the Simcoe County municipalities of Bradford West Gwillimbury and New Tecumseth. The Greater Toronto Area, comprises the whole of the Regional Municipality of York, Regional Municipality of Durham, Regional Municipality of Halton, Regional Municipality of Peel and the City of Toronto.)

Italian immigration to Toronto started as early as the mid 19th century. By 1860, over a dozen "Soldiers of fortune" and "men of letters" lived in Toronto. Italians arrived in Toronto in large numbers during the early 20th century, first settling in an area then known as The Ward, centred on University Avenue and College Street. By the 1920s, most Italians had moved west of Bathurst Street and the College-Clinton area had emerged as the city's major Little Italy. Italian immigration continued into the post-World War II era, where approximately 20,000 to 30,000 Italians immigrated to Canada each year between the early 1950s and the mid-1960s, many of the men working in the construction industry upon settling. In the late 1960s, the Italian economy experienced a period of growth and recovery, removing one of the primary incentives for emigration.

As early as 1961, the presence of new immigrants had already started changing Little Italy. Since the 1970s, Italian immigrants from Little Italy moved northward to Corso Italia on St. Clair Avenue West. Later in the 1970s and 80s, Italian immigrants moved to northwestern parts of the city such as Maple Leaf, Pelmo Park-Humberlea and Humber Summit. Subsequent migration followed the pattern of moving further northwest, to suburbs of Toronto, in particular, the York Region communities of Woodbridge in Vaughan and Nobleton in King, and the Peel Region community of Bolton in Caledon.

== History ==
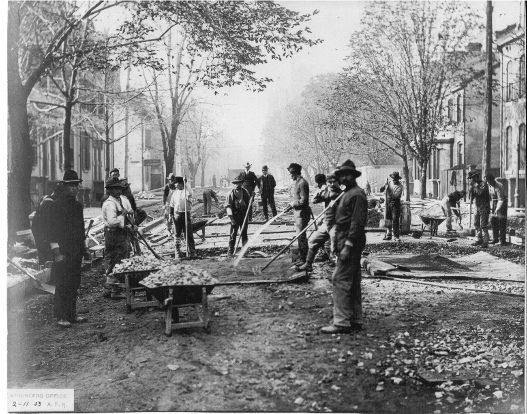
Italian immigrants lay cobblestones on King Street in 1903

The aforementioned "soldiers of fortune" and "men of letters" from Italy immigrated to Toronto prior to the 1850s. Toronto absorbed peddlers and craftspeople from northern Italy until the 1880s. By 1860, 17 Italians lived in Toronto. Additional tradespeople arrived by 1870. After the 1880s many came from northern Italy, with most being from Genoa. The occupations tended to be craftspeople, service tradespeople, and peddlers. When Italians arrived in Toronto in large numbers during the early 20th century, most first settled in The Ward. By the 1920s, most Italians had moved west of Bathurst Street and the College-Clinton area had emerged as the city's major Little Italy. They mainly immigrated to Toronto—increasing from 4,900 Italians in 1911, to 9,000 in 1921, constituting almost two per cent of Toronto's population. Approximately 40,000 Italians came to Canada during the interwar period, predominantly from southern Italy where an economic depression and overpopulation had left many families in poverty.

Italian immigration continued into the post-World War II era, where approximately 20,000 to 30,000 Italians immigrated to Canada each year between the early 1950s and the mid-1960s. By the 1960s, more than 15,000 Italian men worked in Toronto's construction industry, representing one third of all construction workers in the city at that time. 90 per cent of the Italians who immigrated to Canada after World War II remained in Canada, and decades after that period, the community still had fluency in the Italian language. During the 1950s and 1960s, the Italian community shaped Canada's Italian culinary culture as Italian restaurants began to emerge, as well as storefront supermarkets that expanded over time, such as Longo's. In the late 1960s, the Italian economy experienced a period of growth and recovery, removing one of the primary incentives for emigration.

The presence of new immigrants had already started changing Little Italy by 1961. That year, 15,000 Italians, 12,000 being immigrants, lived in Little Italy (35 per cent of the population), declining to 8,000 in 1971, and further to 3,600 in 1991 (13 per cent of the population). Since the 1970s, Italian immigrants from Little Italy moved northward to Corso Italia on St. Clair Avenue West. One of the largest celebrations on St. Clair Avenue West was when Italy won the 1982 FIFA World Cup, which involved an estimated 300,000 fans, shutting the street down for nearly 20 blocks between Caledonia Road and Oakwood Avenue. In 1981, about 35,000 Italians lived in this area, however, by 1991, had dropped to 20,000. Much of the Italian population subsequently moved to the northwestern part of Metropolitan Toronto, and by 2001 the North York neighbourhoods of Maple Leaf, Pelmo Park-Humberlea, and Humber Summit had the highest concentrations of Italian Canadians in the city, with 41.6 per cent, 40.4 per cent and 39.5 per cent respectively, but have been in decline since then. Although the character of Toronto's two Italian enclaves (which later also included Palmerston-Little Italy and Corso Italia-Davenport) have several Italian restaurants and bakeries, the demographics of these neighbourhoods have changed drastically with a smaller Italian population than it had originally.

Later migration followed the aforementioned pattern of moving further northwest to the suburbs and semi-rural areas of Greater Toronto, in particular Woodbridge in Vaughan, Nobleton in King, and Bolton in Caledon. By 2001, 79,835 Italian Canadians lived in Vaughan, accounting for 44.0 per cent of the population. As the presence of new immigrants significantly bolstered the population, the concentration of Italian Canadians has steadily declined, with 85,030 Italian Canadians accounting for 26.5 per cent of the population in 2021. In 2016, the Woodbridge district of Vaughan was home to 55,960 of these Italian Canadians, accounting for 53.5 per cent of the population—the largest ever recorded of a Canadian community. In 2021, the concentration of Italian Canadians in Woodbridge decreased to 46.7 per cent, while the concentration increased slightly in the rural community of Nobleton in King (3,120; 47.6 per cent), 15 km (9.3 mi) north of Woodbridge, as the community with the largest concentration of Italian Canadians.

== Demographics ==
=== Ethnicity ===
As of the 2021 census, 468,970 GTA residents stated they had Italian ancestry, comprising 7.1 percent of the area's population, marking a 8.3 percent decrease from the 511,680 population of the 2016 census. The majority live in Toronto, with 167,460, (six percent of the population), while 145,695 live in York Region (12 percent of the population) — constituting for almost 70 percent of the GTA's population.

Canadians of Italian ethnicity in the Greater Toronto Area by census division (1991–2006)
Census division	Population (1991)	% of ethnic population (1991)	Population (1996)	% of ethnic population (1996)	Population (2001)	% of ethnic population (2001)	Population (2006)	% of ethnic population (2006)
Toronto	212,665 (Note: Includes pre-amalgamated Metropolitan Toronto: North York (83,710, 14.9% of total population), Old Toronto (38,960, 6.1% of total population), Etobicoke (36,660, 11.8% of total population), Scarborough (26,160, 5.0% of total population), York (22,795, 16.3% of total population), East York (4,380, 4.3% of total population))	9.4%	203,220 (Note: Includes pre-amalgamated Metropolitan Toronto: North York (79,745, 13.5% of total population), Old Toronto (37,295, 5.7% of total population), Etobicoke (35,660, 10.9% of total population), Scarborough (25,045, 4.5% of total population), York (20,365, 13.9% of total population), East York (5,115, 4.7% of total population))	8.5%	185,230 (Note: Includes post-amalgamated Metropolitan Toronto. The top concentrations of Italian Canadians in Toronto neighbourhoods: Maple Leaf (41.6%), Pelmo Park-Humberlea (40.4%), Humber Summit (39.5%), Yorkdale-Glen Park (39.3%), Rustic (31.8%), Corso Italia-Davenport (30.2%), Downsview (28.7%), Humber Heights-Westmount (23.8%), Willowridge-Martingrove-Richview (22.8%), Glenfield-Jane Heights (22.1%), Caledonia–Fairbank (20.5%), Thistletown–Beaumond Heights (20.0%), Humbermede (19.9%), York University Heights (18.8%), Briar Hill–Belgravia (18.2%), Keelesdale-Eglinton West (17.9%), Brookhaven-Amesbury (17.2%), Beechborough–Greenbrook (16.5%), Alderwood (14.8%), Kingsview Village (14.5%), Palmerston-Little Italy (14.3%), Elms–Old Rexdale (14.3%), Weston–Pelham Park (13.0%), Humber Valley Village (13.0%), Bathurst Manor (13.0%), Danforth (13.0%), Princess–Rosethorn, Oakwood Village (12.5%), (12.1%), Wychwood (11.7%) Clanton Park (11.5%), Rexdale–Kipling (11.0%), Eringate-Centennial-West Deane (10.6%), Weston (10.3%), Pleasant View (10.0%))	7.5%	180,660 (Note: The top concentrations of Italian Canadians in Toronto neighbourhoods: Maple Leaf (44.8%), Humber Summit (34.5%), Pelmo Park-Humberlea (34.2%), Yorkdale-Glen Park (33.6%), Rustic (31.1%), Downsview (30.6%), Corso Italia-Davenport (27.6%), Willowridge-Martingrove-Richview (20.4%), Humber Heights-Westmount (20.4%), Glenfield-Jane Heights (18.5%), Oakwood Village (16.8%), York University Heights (16.7%), Caledonia–Fairbank (16.4%), Thistletown–Beaumond Heights (16.2%), Palmerston-Little Italy (15.5%), Keelesdale-Eglinton West (15.4%), Humber Valley Village (15.0%), Clanton Park (14.9%), Briar Hill–Belgravia (14.8%), Humbermede (14.4%), Brookhaven-Amesbury (14.2%), Weston–Pelham Park (14.0%), Princess–Rosethorn (13.9%), Kingsview Village (13.3%), Elms–Old Rexdale (13.6%), Beechborough–Greenbrook (13.5%), Alderwood (12.8%), Danforth (12.4%), Eringate-Centennial-West Deane (11.8%), Weston (11.5%), Wychwood (11.1%))	7.3%
York Region	86,755	17.2%	103,935	17.5%	126,740	17.4%	150,245	16.9%
Peel Region	67,585	9.2%	78,765	9.2%	85,020	8.6%	93,200	8.1%
Halton Region	17,440	5.6%	22,900	6.7%	26,345	7.1%	35,525	8.2%
Durham Region	16,610	4.1%	21,250	4.6%	25,235	5.0%	31,200	5.6%
Greater Toronto Area (total)	401,055	9.1%	430,070	9.3%	448,570	8.9%	490,830	8.9%
Toronto CMA	387,655	10.1%	414,310	9.8%	429,380	9.2%	466,155	9.2%

Canadians of Italian ethnicity in the Greater Toronto Area by census division (2011–2021)
Census division	Population (2011)	% of ethnic population (2011)	Population (2016)	% of ethnic population (2016)	Population (2021)	% of ethnic population (2021)
Toronto	177,065 (Note: The top concentrations of Italian Canadians in Toronto neighbourhoods: Maple Leaf (34.8%), Pelmo Park-Humberlea (34.0%), Humber Summit (30.2%), Yorkdale-Glen Park (28.2%), Downsview (26.3%), Rustic (24.3%), Humber Heights-Westmount (23.2%), Corso Italia-Davenport (19.9%), Willowridge-Martingrove-Richview (19.2%), Oakwood Village (15.6%), Humber Valley Village (15.2%), York University Heights (14.6%), Glenfield-Jane Heights (14.6%), Princess–Rosethorn (14.4%), Kingsview Village (13.8%), Brookhaven-Amesbury (13.4%), Beechborough–Greenbrook (13.3%), Elms–Old Rexdale (12.9%), Thistletown–Beaumond Heights (12.1%), Clanton Park (12.0%), Kingsway South (11.7%), Caledonia–Fairbank (11.4%), Humbermede (11.3%), Palmerston-Little Italy (11.2%), Rexdale–Kipling (11.2%), Briar Hill–Belgravia (11.0%), Bathurst Manor (10.3%))	6.9%	182,495 (Note: The top concentrations of Italian Canadians in Toronto neighbourhoods: Maple Leaf (35.2%), Yorkdale-Glen Park (27.4%), Pelmo Park-Humberlea (26.6%), Humber Summit (24.0%), Rustic (22.6%), Downsview (23.4%), Humber Heights-Westmount (21.0%), Corso Italia-Davenport (20.7%), Willowridge-Martingrove-Richview (19.3%), Princess–Rosethorn (17.7%), Humber Valley Village (16.7%), Oakwood Village (14.8%), Glenfield-Jane Heights (14.1%), Caledonia–Fairbank (12.8%), York University Heights (12.5%), Kingsview Village (12.4%), Brookhaven-Amesbury (12.2%), Danforth (12.0%), Palmerston-Little Italy (11.7%), Briar Hill–Belgravia (11.6%), Kingsway South (11.6%), Eringate-Centennial-West Deane (11.5%), Thistletown–Beaumond Heights (11.3%), Bathurst Manor (11.2%), Rexdale–Kipling (10.8%), Clanton Park (10.4%), Humbermede (10.4%), Stonegate–Queensway (10.4%), Weston–Pelham Park (10.1%))	6.8%	167,460 (Note: The top concentrations of Italian Canadians in Toronto neighbourhoods: Maple Leaf (30.3%), Yorkdale-Glen Park (23.0%), Downsview (22.3%), Pelmo Park-Humberlea (22.1%), Humber Summit (21.5%), Rustic (21.4%), Humber Heights-Westmount (19.9%), Willowridge-Martingrove-Richview (18.7%), Princess–Rosethorn (17.1%), Corso Italia-Davenport (16.7%), Humber Valley Village (16.6%), Oakdale-Beverley Heights (15.8%), Glenfield-Jane Heights (12.6%), Glenfield-Jane Heights (12.6%), Kingsway South (12.2%), Thistletown–Beaumond Heights (11.8%), Palmerston-Little Italy (11.7%), Alderwood (11.6%), Kingsview Village (10.7%), Oakwood Village (10.7%), Runnymede–Bloor West Village (10.5%), Danforth (10.3%), Eringate-Centennial-West Deane (10.0%), Islington (10.0%))	6.1%
York Region	159,950	15.6%	159,465	14.5%	145,695	12.5%
Peel Region	89,665	7.0%	88,110	6.4%	76,240	5.3%
Halton Region	40,495	8.2%	44,695	8.3%	43,970	7.5%
Durham Region	33,415	5.6%	36,915	5.8%	35,605	5.2%
Greater Toronto Area (total)	500,590	8.4%	511,680	8.1%	468,970	7.1%
Toronto CMA	475,090	8.6%	484,360	8.3%	444,755	7.2%

Canadians of Italian ethnicity in the Greater Toronto Area by census subdivision (1991–2006)
Census subdivision	Population (1991)	% of ethnic population (1991)	Population (1996)	% of ethnic population (1996)	Population (2001)	% of ethnic population (2001)	Population (2006)	% of ethnic population (2006)
Vaughan	51,605	46.3%	60,125	45.4%	79,835	44.0%	91,325	38.4%
Mississauga	42,630	9.2%	47,365	8.7%	48,035	7.9%	49,025	7.4%
Brampton	20,610	8.8%	24,345	9.1%	25,775	8.0%	28,850	6.7%
Richmond Hill	12,705	15.9%	15,765	15.5%	16,360	12.4%	20,830	12.9%
Markham	11,395	7.4%	12,160	7.0%	11,830	5.7%	14,110	5.4%
Oakville	7,775	6.8%	10,615	8.3%	12,280	8.6%	15,195	9.2%
Burlington	6,325	4.9%	7,715	5.6%	9,520	6.4%	11,430	7.0%
Oshawa	5,060	3.9%	5,335	4.0%	6,050	4.3%	6,850	4.9%
Caledon	4,345	12.4%	7,055	17.7%	11,215	22.3%	15,330	27.0%
Pickering	3,615	5.3%	4,970	6.3%	5,820	6.7%	6,100	7.0%
King	3,320	18.3%	3,880	21.3%	4,175	22.6%	5,105	26.3%
Whitby	2,960	4.8%	4,175	5.7%	5,350	6.2%	7,515	6.8%
Newmarket	2,505	5.5%	4,250	7.4%	5,825	9.0%	6,705	9.1%
Ajax	2,380	4.2%	3,370	5.2%	3,990	5.4%	4,805	5.4%
Milton	2,085	6.5%	2,470	7.7%	2,355	7.6%	4,730	8.9%
Aurora	1,915	6.5%	3,605	10.3%	4,030	10.1%	5,455	11.6%
Clarington	1,750	3.5%	2,165	3.6%	2,590	3.8%	3,850	5.0%
Whitchurch-Stouffville	1,320	7.2%	1,440	7.3%	1,500	6.9%	2,880	12.0%
Halton Hills	1,255	3.4%	2,095	4.9%	2,195	4.6%	4,165	7.5%
Georgina	1,075	3.6%	1,610	4.6%	2,105	5.4%	2,200	5.3%
East Gwillimbury	875	4.8%	1,090	5.5%	1,085	5.4%	1,605	7.8%
Uxbridge	405	2.9%	525	3.3%	660	3.8%	1,100	5.8%
Scugog	360	2.0%	510	2.7%	630	3.2%	675	3.2%
Brock	70	0.6%	300	2.6%	155	1.3%	300	2.6%

Canadians of Italian ethnicity in the Greater Toronto Area by census subdivision (2011–2021)
Census subdivision	Population (2011)	% of ethnic population (2011)	Population (2016)	% of ethnic population (2016)	Population (2021)	% of ethnic population (2021)
Vaughan	94,970	33.2%	94,725 (Note: A location to note within Vaughan, is the community of Woodbridge, which has the single largest concentration of Italian Canadians in Canada (55,960, 53.5% of total population).)	31.1%	85,030 (Note: A location to note within Vaughan, is the community of Woodbridge (49,660, 46.7% of total population).)	26.5%
Mississauga	46,101	6.5%	44,840	6.3%	38,075	5.3%
Brampton	27,780	5.3%	25,185	4.3%	20,535	3.2%
Richmond Hill	21,570	11.7%	19,210	9.9%	16,125	8.0%
Oakville	16,970	9.4%	16,900	8.8%	15,315	7.2%
Caledon	15,875	26.9%	18,095 (Note: A location to note within Caledon, is the population centre of Bolton (11,900, 45.5% of total population).)	27.3%	17,630 (Note: A location to note within Caledon, is the population centre of Bolton (11,480; 43.4% of total population).)	23.2%
Markham	13,130	4.4%	12,060	3.7%	9,515	2.8%
Burlington	12,755	7.4%	14,235	7.9%	15,545	8.5%
Whitby	9,405	7.5%	9,385	7.4%	8,790	6.4%
Newmarket	7,880	10.0%	8,045	9.7%	7,405	8.6%
Oshawa	7,400	5.0%	8,705	5.5%	8,635	5.0%
Aurora	6,795	13.0%	6,835	12.5%	6,315	10.3%
Milton	6,530	7.8%	8,345	7.7%	7,620	5.8%
King	6,340	32.1%	8,405 (Note: Two locations to note within King, is the population centre of Nobleton (2,170, 46.8% of total population) and the population centre of Schomberg (1,085; 39.5%).)	34.5%	9,555 (Note: Two locations to note within King, is the population centre of Nobleton, which has the single largest concentration of Italian Canadians in Canada (3,120; 47.6% of total population) and the population centre of Schomberg (810; 31.2%).)	35.1%
Pickering	6,065	6.9%	5,940	6.5%	5,570	5.7%
Ajax	5,405	5.0%	5,390	4.5%	4,320	3.4%
Whitchurch-Stouffville	4,680	12.6%	5,325	11.7%	5,005	10.1%
Halton Hills	4,245	7.3%	5,215	8.7%	5,490	8.8%
Clarington	3,825	4.6%	4,775	5.2%	5,320	5.3%
Georgina	2,880	6.7%	2,815	6.3%	3,465	7.4%
East Gwillimbury	1,695	7.7%	2,045	8.7%	3,270	9.6%
Uxbridge	845	4.1%	1,205	5.7%	1,620	7.6%
Scugog	620	2.9%	1,035	4.9%	915	4.3%
Brock	215	1.9%	470	4.1%	425	3.5%

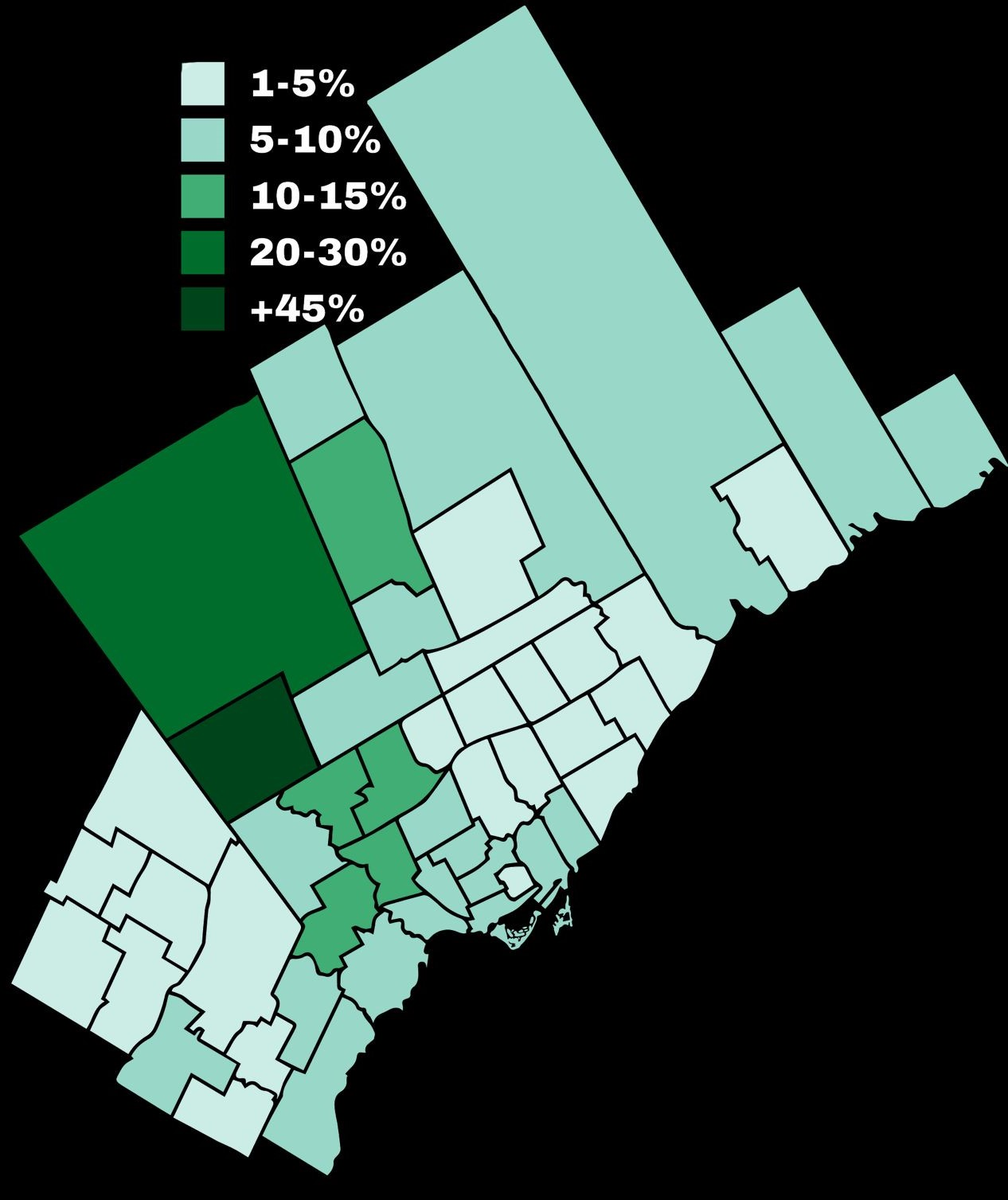
Italian Canadians as a percent of population by federal electoral district

Canadians of Italian ethnicity in the Greater Toronto Area by federal electoral districts (greater than 10,000) (2016–2021)
Riding	Population (2016)	% of ethnic population (2016)	Population (2021)	% of ethnic population (2021)
Vaughan—Woodbridge	55,960	53.5%	49,660	46.7%
King—Vaughan	40,955	31.2%	39,040	26.5%
Etobicoke Centre	17,545	15.1%	16,515	14.1%
York South—Weston	14,710	12.8%	12,680	11.0%
Aurora—Oak Ridges—Richmond Hill	14,160	12.4%	11,740	10.0%
York Centre	13,880	13.4%	12,610	11.8%
Humber River—Black Creek	13,800	12.8%	11,335	10.2%
Oakville North—Burlington	12,260	9.6%	12,205	8.3%
Newmarket—Aurora	11,955	10.3%	11,120	8.9%
Davenport	11,875	11.1%	N/A	N/A
Etobicoke—Lakeshore	11,545	9.1%	12,230	8.7%
Mississauga—Lakeshore	10,565	9.1%	N/A	N/A

=== Language and immigration ===
As of 2021, of the 468,970 Italians in the GTA, 89,380 are Italian born immigrants, with 128,420 claiming Italian as their mother tongue.

Italian mother tongue speakers in the Greater Toronto Area by census division (1991–2006)
Census division	Population (1991)	% of non-official language mother tongue speakers (1991)	Population (1996)	% of non-official language mother tongue speakers (1996)	Population (2001)	% of non-official language mother tongue speakers (2001)	Population (2006)	% of non-official language mother tongue speakers (2006)
Toronto	115,660	15.4%	114,095	11.5%	99,230	9.0%	85,055	7.3%
York Region	40,915	32.7%	49,040	25.5%	57,535	20.9%	60,800	15.6%
Peel Region	26,875	14.9%	31,465	11.4%	30,995	8.4%	30,920	6.1%
Halton Region	4,600	12.5%	5,835	12.5%	6,050	11.0%	7,120	8.8%
Durham Region	4,685	12.8%	6,110	12.8%	6,385	11.9%	6,825	9.7%
Greater Toronto Area (total)	192,735	17.7%	206,545	14.7%	200,195	12.2%	190,720	9.5%
Toronto CMA	218,120	17.3%	202,440	13.3%	195,960	10.8%	N/A	N/A

Italian mother tongue speakers in the Greater Toronto Area by census division (2011–2021)
Census division	Population (2011)	% of non-official language mother tongue speakers (2011)	Population (2016)	% of non-official language mother tongue speakers (2016)	Population (2021)	% of non-official language mother tongue speakers (2021)
Toronto	71,725	6.2%	62,640	5.3%	50,995	4.4%
York Region	58,305	12.6%	54,685	10.3%	46,270	8.3%
Peel Region	27,015	4.7%	24,420	3.9%	19,795	3.0%
Halton Region	7,215	6.9%	7,060	5.2%	6,150	3.7%
Durham Region	6,265	8.2%	6,140	6.2%	5,210	4.2%
Greater Toronto Area (total)	183,200	7.7%	154,945	6.2%	128,420	4.8%
Toronto CMA	166,415	7.2%	151,415	6.0%	125,895	4.8%

Italian immigrant population in the Greater Toronto Area by census division (2011–2021)
Census division	Population (2011)	% of immigrants (2011)	Population (2016)	% of immigrants (2016)	Population (2021)	% of immigrants (2021)
Toronto	53,485	4.3%	45,515	3.6%	37,705	2.9%
York Region	38,100	8.2%	36,040	7.0%	31,305	5.6%
Peel Region	17,780	2.7%	16,575	2.3%	13,525	1.8%
Durham Region	3,955	2.6%	3,860	2.6%	3,295	1.8%
Halton Region	3,780	2.9%	3,785	2.4%	3,550	1.8%
Greater Toronto Area (total)	117,100	4.5%	105,775	3.8%	89,380	3.0%
Toronto CMA (Note: 159,225 (12.9%) in 1986; 154,670 (10.5%) in 1991; 146,515 (8.3%) in 1996; 138,995 (6.8%) in 2001; 130,685 (5.6%) in 2006)	115,060	4.5%	103,620	3.8%	87,875	3.1%

== Media ==
Italian newspapers, television, and radio have existed throughout Toronto's history. Son to Italian immigrants, Johnny Lombardi was born in The Ward in 1915, and went on to found one of the first multilingual radio stations in Canada, CHIN in 1966, in Palmerston-Little Italy.

== Notable residents ==
- Jimi Bertucci
- Alessia Cara
- Michael Cera
- Philip de Grassi (imperial officer of the United Kingdom army)
- James Forneri (professor of Modern Languages from the University of Toronto) - Originated from the Piedmont
- Johnny Lombardi
- Franceso Rossi (Toronto's first confectioner)
- Daniela Sanzone

The Italian Walk of Fame acknowledges ethnic Italians. It is located in Little Italy.

== See also ==
- Demographics of Toronto
- Italians in Montreal
- Italian language in Canada
