= Maple Leaf, Ontario =

Maple Leaf is the name of two communities in Ontario:

- Maple Leaf, a community within Hastings Highlands, Ontario
- Maple Leaf, Toronto, a community within North York, Ontario
