= Rustication =

Rustication, occasionally rustification (literally "to or of the countryside"), may refer to:

- Rustication (architecture), a style of masonry giving stones a deliberately rough finish
- Rustication (academia), temporary expulsion from a university (literally, to be sent to the countryside)
- Rustication (Cultural Revolution), also known as "Sent-down youths", a government policy enacted during the Chinese Cultural Revolution
- Rustication (UK military), the process of posting a person or relocating a unit from London (or a command HQ) to elsewhere in the country

== See also ==
- Rustic (disambiguation)
