= Daniela Sanzone =

Italian-Canadian journalist

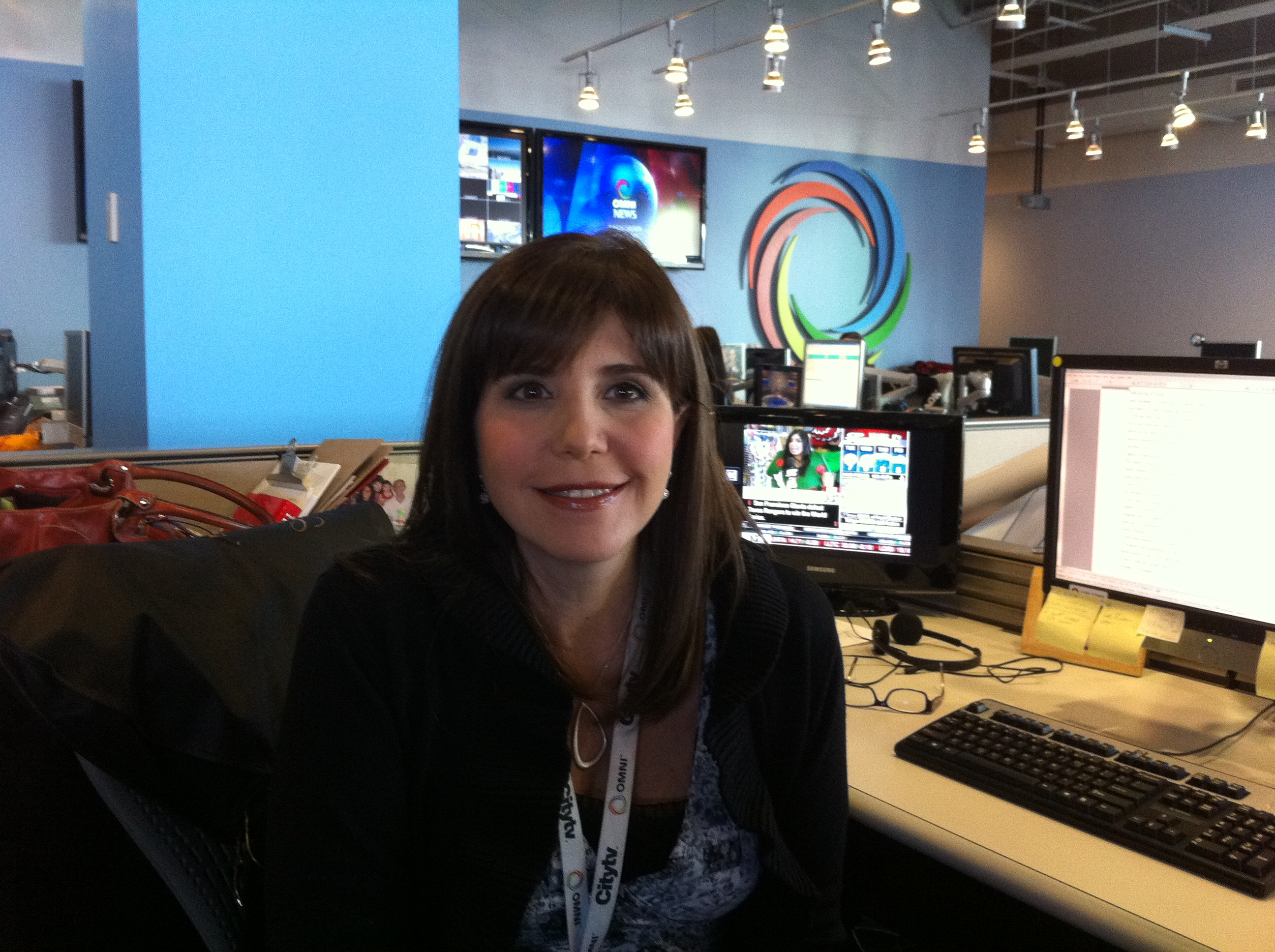
- Daniela Sanzone
- Born: April 20; Rome, Italy
- Occupation(s): Journalist, Writer, Researcher, TA, Novelist, Diversity Consultant

Daniela Sanzone is an Italian and Canadian journalist and writer. She lives in Toronto, where she is a teaching assistant and a PhD candidate at York University in communication and culture, graduate joint program at York University and Toronto Metropolitan University. Her research interests are Canadian broadcasting policies, journalism, and ethnic media, also known as third language media or ethnic minority media. For many years she was a news anchor and a reporter for the Italian News at Omni Television, a Canadian multicultural channel owned by Rogers Media, and the on-air host of the daily program Pomeriggio Italiano (Italian Afternoon). In 2016 she published her first novel, "La guerra secondo Michele" (The War According to Michele).

== Biography ==
Sanzone was born and raised in Rome, Italy. She has a bachelor's degree in literature and fine arts from La Sapienza University in Rome, with a dissertation in film history and critique, and a master's in communication sciences and cultural anthropology of complex societies. She has been living in Toronto since December 2000.

== Career ==
Her career in Canada started at Corriere Canadese, the Italian newspaper based in Toronto, where she worked for two years. Then, she joined the team at Omni Television, as a news anchor and a reporter for the Italian News; in her long experience at Omni, she was also the on-air host and producer of the daily program Pomeriggio Italiano. For many years, Sanzone was also the Canada News coordinator for the Italian Press Agency ANSA and a free-lancer for the daily Italian newspaper Il Manifesto, as well as several magazines, like Marie Claire, Amica, La rivista del cinematografo, and Grazia. In 2013, with the Canadian-Italian musician Daniela Nardi, she organized ORA: Culture-Canada-Italy-Now, which included a Speakers Circle about immigration identity, culture in Toronto, how the Italian community is changing in the digital era, and therefore how to find new ways to interest and connect the new Italian immigrants and the future generations. In 2001 she organized a focus on the Italian Canadian cinema, bringing three films done by Paul Tana, Tony Nardi, and Bruno Ramirez and the three people mentioned at the Sulmona International Film Festival, in Italy.

In Rome, Italy, where she is a giornalista professionista (professional journalist) and a film critic, she worked as a writer for Sereno Variabile, a program about traveling, broadcast by RAI Television (Italian National Television). Among other publications, she worked as an entertainment editor for the daily newspaper Ultime Notizie (Last News), and as an assistant producer of the online Daily News, published by RaiNet and Italia Cinema (today Cinecittà News), all based in Rome. In 1998 she was awarded the "European Personality" and received this recognition in Campidoglio, Rome City Hall, Capitoline Hill.

== Publications ==
- Novel, "La Guerra secondo Michele" (The War According to Michele), 2016 - Ten booklets, "I Miti" (The Myths), enclosed in the international movies’ DVDs series published by Warner Bros. 1999. - Book, co-author, "Strofe Sfiziose", All’insegna del pesce d’oro (In the name of the gold fish, publisher) by Vanni Scheiwiller. Milan, 1998 - Article in a Book: "Marinetti e i Futuristi a Capri" ("Marinetti and the Futurists in Capri"). In Elisabetta Traini (Ed.) Bragaglia racconta Bragaglia, carosello di divagazioni saggi e ricordi (Bragaglia tells Bragaglia, essays and memories). All’insegna del pesce d’oro (In the name of the gold fish, publisher) by Vanni Scheiwiller. Milan, 1997. - Booklet, Marsala, the taste of a city, INC (National Institute of Communication). Rome, 1997. - Book, researcher, La "scuola" italiana: storia, strutture e immaginario di un altro cinema (1988-1996) (The Italian "school": history, structures and imaginary of another cinema). (Pesaro Film festival). Pesaro, 1996. - Book, co-author, Extravagant strophes by Carlo Ludovico Bragaglia, illustrated by his friends of cinema, All’insegna del pesce d’oro (In the name of the gold fish, publisher) by Vanni Scheiwiller, Milan, 1994.

== Academic Publications ==
"From Mass Media immigration to professional workers – A portrait of the present Italian ‘Comunità’ in Ontario", Italian Canadiana, Frank Iacobucci Centre for Italian Studies. University of Toronto, Vol.26-29 (2012-2015) "The Global Intercultural Communication Reader", Canadian Journal of Communication, Vol. 40 N. 4 (2015). published in the Canadian Journal of Communication. "Global Media Ethics", Edited by Stephen J.A. Ward, Wiley-Blackwell, 2013, published in the Canadian Journal of Communication.

== Presentations ==
In Washington, in March 2013, she presented at the PCA CA Conference "From mass immigration to professional workers - A portrait of the present Italian "comunità" in Ontario (Canada). In Toronto, in 2006 she presented the lecture, Multiculturalism in the World of Mass Media During the Digital Era, for the Iacobucci Center of Italian Studies at the University of Toronto, and published in the book The Virtual Piazza. She also held the lecture Italy and Italians on the North American Silver Screen, at 79th Congress of the American Association of Teachers of Italian, in November 2002 at the Ontario Institute for Studies in Education.

== See also ==
- Italians in Toronto
