= Jimi Bertucci =

Canadian artist

Jimi Bertucci (born October 22, 1951) is an Italian Canadian singer, songwriter, musician and composer. He is best known as the founding member, bassist and singer-songwriter for the 1970s pop-rock band Abraham's Children.

== Biography ==
Jimi Bertucci was born in Serra San Bruno, Calabria, Italy and immigrated to Canada at the age of 5.

Still in his teens, he teamed up with a friend, guitarist Ron Bartley, to form a group called Just Us. Soon percussionist Brian Cotterill and keyboardist Bob McPherson were added to fill out the lineup. After a couple of name changes and a record deal, Just Us became known as Abraham's Children. As the band's songwriter, Bertucci penned their first national hit song called "Goodbye Farewell". Other hits followed including "Gypsy", "Thank You" and "Goddess of Nature". Shawn O'Shea was later added to the group as a second guitarist. The band toured heavily and extensively throughout the United States and Canada.

Bertucci later went on to become in-house writer and producer for United Artists Records, forming and working with bands like Angel and Space Patrol.

In 1982, he went solo and signed with A&M Records, releasing his self-titled album Jimi B., which received rave reviews and established him as one of Canada's best exports.

Although Bertucci was born in Italy, he spent most of his childhood in Toronto, Ontario, Canada, and has recorded songs in both English and Italian. He now divides his time between Los Angeles and Toronto. He continues to write and release new material.

On October 20, 2005 he was presented with the Certosa Award for his contribution to the Arts by the Serra San Bruno Association, an association representing his home town in Italy.

He is the brother-in-law of American actor Gary Graham, best known for his starring role as Detective Matt Sikes in the television series Alien Nation (1989–1990).

In 2009 Bertucci co-founded the Italian Walk of Fame in Toronto.

== Singles ==
- Hot Love 1972
- Goodbye Farewell 1972
- Gypsy 1973
- Thank You 1973
- Rockin in the City 1974
- Back Home 1974
- Goddess of Nature 1975
- Deni 1976

== See also ==
- Italians in Toronto
