= Rustic =

Rustic may refer to:

- Rural area
- Pastoral

== Architecture ==
- Rustication (architecture), a masonry technique mainly employed in Renaissance architecture
- Rustic architecture, an informal architectural style in the United States and Canada with several variations

== Zoology ==
- Rustic moths, various noctuid moths of subfamilies Hadeninae and Noctuinae, including
  - The rustic, (Hoplodrina blanda, Hadeninae)
- The rustic (Cupha erymanthis), a brush-footed butterfly
- Rustic sphinx (Manduca rustica), a hawkmoth

== Other uses ==
- Rustic, Toronto, a neighbourhood in Toronto, Ontario, Canada
- Rustic capitals, a formal Roman script
