= Eringate-Centennial-West Deane =

- Neighbourhood
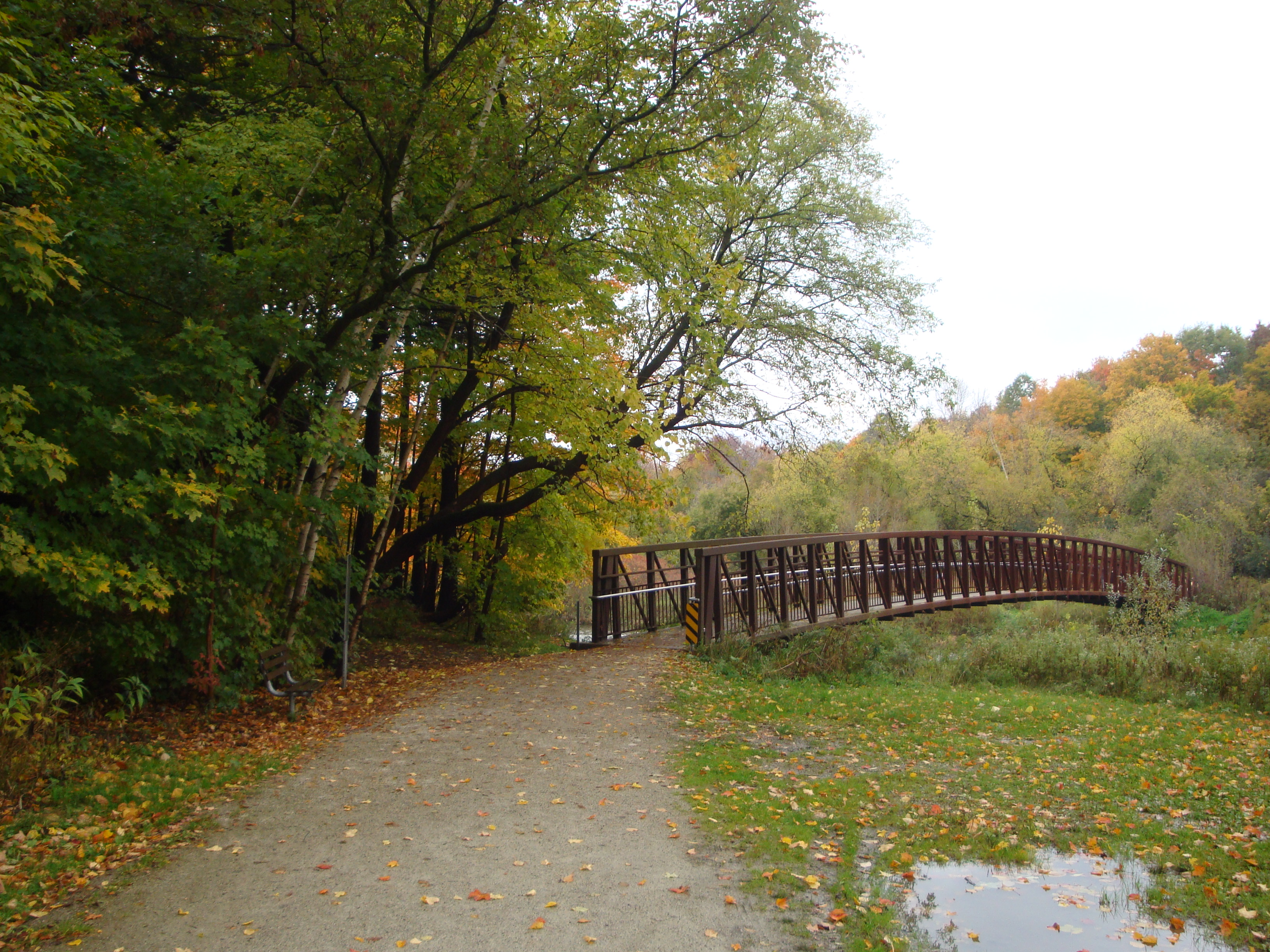
- View of Centennial Park, located in the neighbourhood

- Location within Toronto
- Coordinates: 43.661383°N 79.57072°W
- Country: Canada
- Province: Ontario
- City: Toronto
- Established: 1850 Etobicoke Township
- Changed municipality: 1998 Toronto from City of Etobicoke

Government
  - MP: Yvan Baker (Etobicoke Centre)
  - MPP: Kinga Surma(Etobicoke Centre)
  - Councillor: Stephen Holyday (Ward 2 Etobicoke Centre)

Eringate-Centennial-West Deane is a neighbourhood in the city of Toronto, Canada. Eringate-Centennial-West Deane borders the city of Mississauga.

== Location ==
Eringate-Centennial-West Deane is a neighbourhood located in the north western corner of the city of Toronto, Ontario, Canada, in close proximity to Pearson Airport and Highway 427. It is bounded on the west by Centennial Park and golf course, to the north by Eglinton Avenue West, on the east by Martin Grove Road, and on the south by Rathburn Road. The neighbourhood itself is fairly large, and encompasses several communities including West Deane Park and Centennial Park.

== History ==
=== West Deane Park ===
West Deane Park was farmland before the land was bought in the 1930s by construction magnate Percy Law. On this land, Law raised cattle and racehorses, built and maintained a storage depot for construction equipment and built a Colonial Revival style home. In the 1960s, the land was sold to prominent developer Edmund Peachey, whose company built much of the existing development. Peachey named the area West Deane Park after his wife Deane. Today the area is populated by people and families with varying income levels, ethnicities and household sizes.

=== Vallengrove Park ===
Vallengrove Park is a subdivision developed in 1961 between Wellesworth area and highway 27 by Vallen- Grove Developments. The three bedroom-one bath simple brick bungalows with garage on approx. fifty foot wide lots sold for approx. seventeen thousand dollars new. Their real estate value in 2011 sold from four hundred and seventy five thousand and up. By the year 2020, those same houses saw their market value increase to nine hundred thousand, and from one million to one million-two hundred thousand with modern renovations. It was marked in the early 1960s by a red brick entrance (West Deane still had its named entrance towards the Millennium) at the then connecting Birgitta Crescent, to the long-gone off entrance from the southbound service road of then Highway 27 (a farm house and barn stood there where today's off ramp is), and leading into the suburb between that west of 27 towards Wellesworth Park, and halfway north along Odessa Ave. and as far as Renforth Dr. That new area was built in 1961. The older area further north along Odessa and nearby streets, was built a few years earlier: wherever one sees the old wood hydro poles instead of concrete. Vallengrove Park was once farmland. Cows bones were found by children digging around before all areas were paved and settled, and another farm was at the location of the Catholic church - Nativity of Our Lord and was torn down at same time. Forty-one homes in the area were expropriated and moved to Bramalea when Highway 27 was expanded into the 427 in 1970. The nine and ten year old residences moved, were only the eastern most homes of Summerfield Crescent, and other nearby north-south streets with any home which happened to have back yards which were right behind the old service road, which became the sound barrier wall and hill. (they are now located on Epsom Downs Drive). Part of their front lawns can be seen today at the sound barrier wall. Wellesworth Junior School was opened in 1960 when hundreds of tulips were given by the Netherlands for planting. Tulips are still grown there almost 50 years later. The area's high school was Vincent Massey Collegiate Institute. It closed in 1986 with a reunion there. The northernmost part of The West Mall (an important and very busy artery today) ended as a bumpy, dirt bicycle path a short distance south of its intersection at Rathburn. The south end of that unfinished part continued to the edge of Burnhamthorpe, where Percy Bishop built the new Etobicort Mall across from the Shaver/Bishop farm house - then directly at the corner of Burnhamthorpe and The West Mall. Mr. Bishop gave land to Etobicoke in order for the road to be opened up, and had it built, around 1964.

== Schools ==
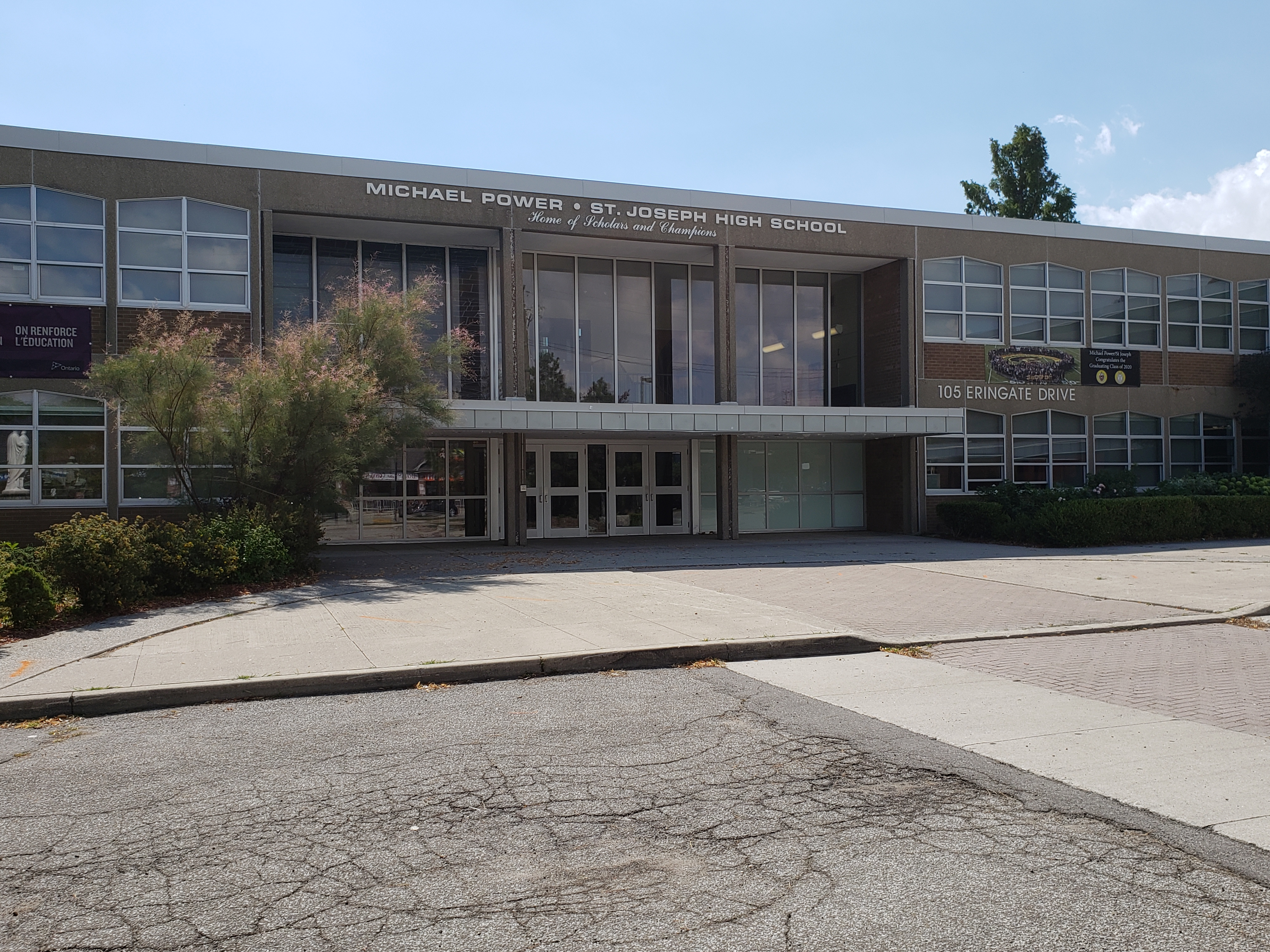
Vincent Massey Collegiate Institute is a defunct public secondary school located in this neighborhood from 1961 to 1985, Since 1993, Michael Power/St. Joseph High School a public secondary separate school, operated by the Toronto Catholic District School Board, is housed there.

- Briarcrest Junior School - A public elementary school located at 60 Wellesworth Drive, east of Renforth Drive. It was opened in September 1958.
- Hollycrest Middle School - A middle school located close to the intersection of Renforth Drive and Rathburn Road. It is on the western boundary of the Toronto District School Board. It was built in 1967 as a special Centennial project. The school hosts a High Performers program. It has wide, open spaces, bordering the Etobicoke Olympium. Students from elementary schools such as Wellesworth Junior School, Briarcrest Junior School, Mill Valley Junior School and Broadacres Junior School are most likely to be in Hollycrest. There are also students from all over Etobicoke. Hollycrest is a feeder school for Silverthorn Collegiate Institute and was formerly a feeder for the now-closed nearby Vincent Massey Collegiate Institute.
- Josyf Cardinal Slipyj Elementary Byzantine Rite Catholic School (housed in the former West Deane Junior School)
- Michael Power/St. Joseph High School (housed in the former Vincent Massey Collegiate Institute building, founded 1961 until 1985)
- Mother Cabrini Catholic Elementary School
- Nativity of Our Lord Elementary School - A Catholic elementary school located at 35 Saffron Crescent, close to the intersection of Renforth Drive and Rathburn Road. It is situated next door to the church of the same name. The school has 2 floors and 9 outdoor portable classrooms. The school has an optional French immersion program that begins in Grade 5. It is a feeder school for Etobicoke's first Catholic secondary school, Michael Power/St. Joseph High School, which moved to a nearby location in the 1990s.
- Seneca School is a public elementary school located on Rathburn Road close to the intersection of Renforth Drive, beside the Etobicoke Olympium and in Centennial Park. The school was originally built by the Metropolitan Toronto Association for the mentally challenged in 1967. At that time, it served students from ages seven to twenty-one years of age. Currently, the school provides a structured team approach to support primary and junior students, aged 4 to 12, who have developmental challenges.
- Wellesworth Junior School is a public elementary school located at 225 Wellesworth Drive, north of Rathburn Road, east of Renforth Drive and west of Highway 427. It was opened in 1960.

== Institutions ==
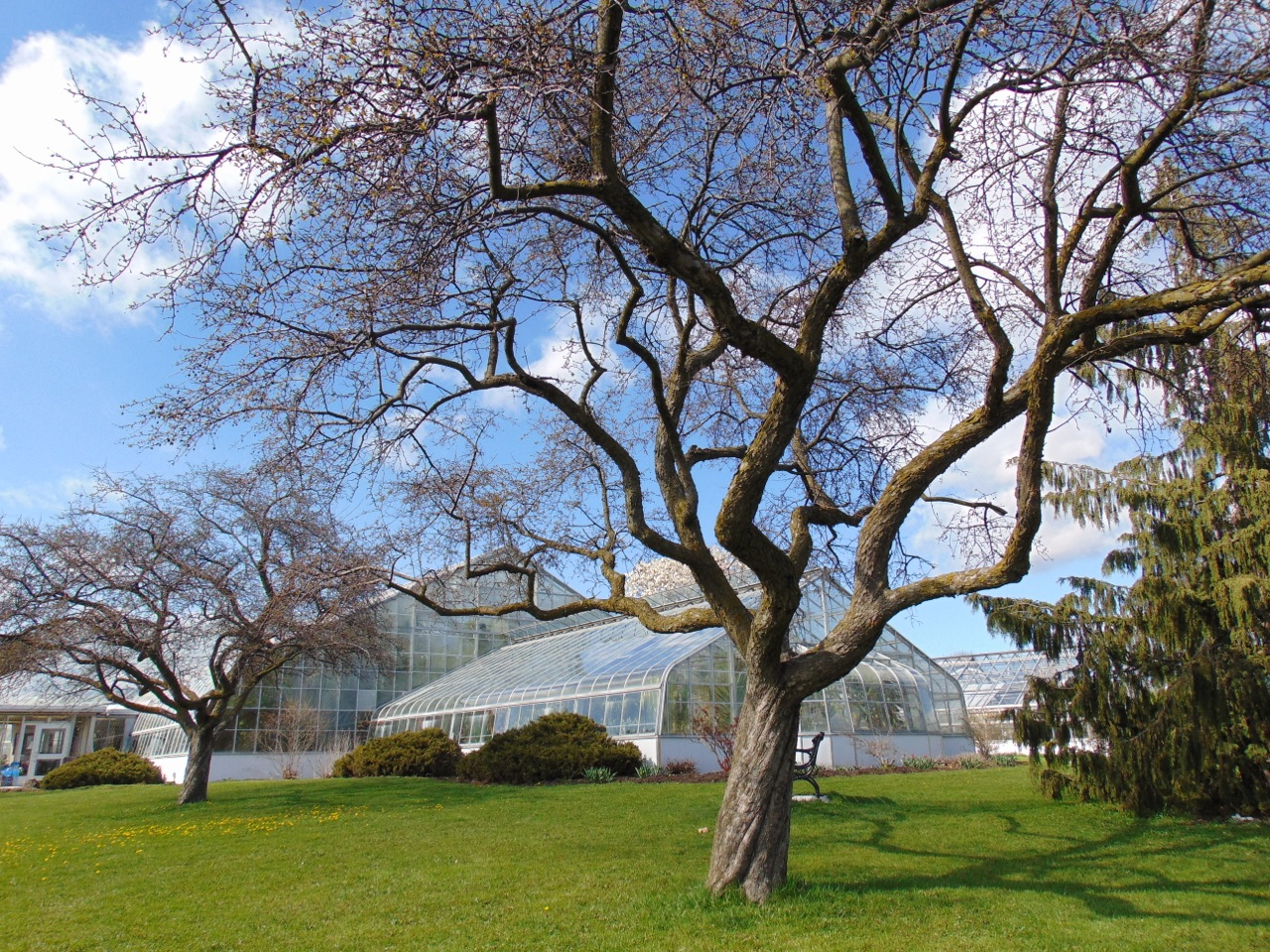
Centennial Park is a large regional park that is home to a number of sports facilities, and a conservatory.

- Briarcrest Park
- Centennial Park
- Centennial Park Golf Centre
- Elmbrook Park Library
- Eringate Mall
- Eringate Park
- Wellesworth Park
- West Deane Park

=== Churches ===
- Richview United Church
- Graceview Presbyterian Church
- St Philip's Evangelical Lutheran Church
- Gospel of Christ Church
- Nativity of Our Lord Roman Catholic Church
- Local meetinghouse of the Church of Jesus Christ of Latter-day Saints
- Church of Christ the King
