= Humber Heights-Westmount =

- Neighbourhood
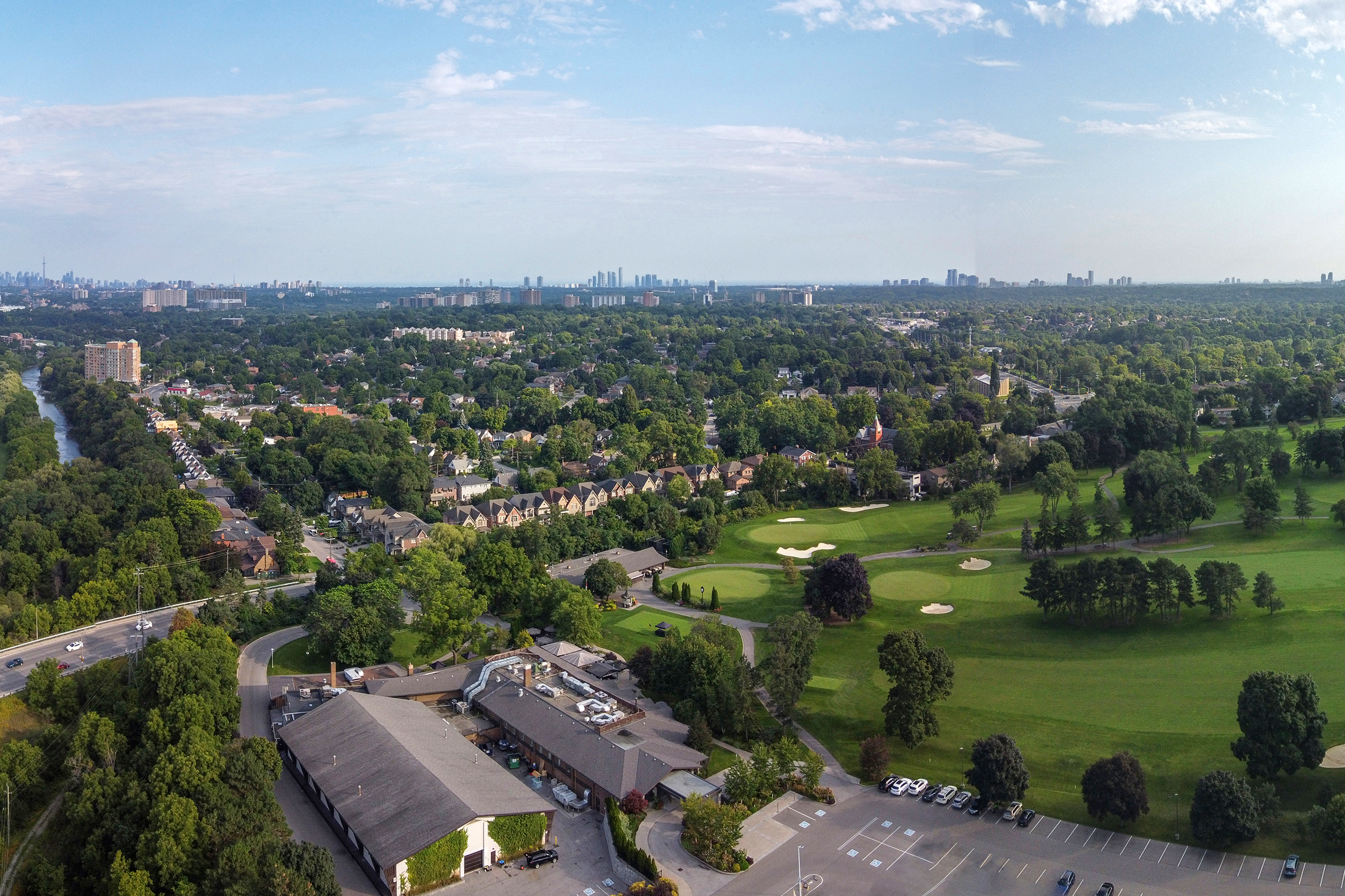
- Aerial view of Humber Heights-Westmount in Weston Golf & Country Club in 2024
- Interactive map of Humber Heights-Westmount
- Coordinates: 43°41′50″N 79°31′33″W
- Country: Canada
- Province: Ontario
- City: Toronto
- Established: 1850 Etobicoke Township
- Changed municipality: 1998 Toronto from City of Etobicoke

Government
  - MP: Yvan Baker (Etobicoke Centre)
  - MPP: Kinga Surma (Etobicoke Centre)
  - Councillor: Stephen Holyday (Ward 2 Etobicoke Centre)

Population (2016)
  - Total: 10,948
  - Density: 3,981/km^{2} (10,310/sq mi)

Humber Heights-Westmount, also known as Humbervale, is a neighbourhood in Toronto, Ontario, Canada. The neighbourhood is bounded by the west bank of the Humber River, west to Royal York Road and south to Eglinton Avenue West. The Humber Creek divides the area into the northern 'Humber Heights' (originally the Etobicoke side of York Township's Weston) and the southern 'Westmount' (originally part of the 'Richview' farming district) centred along Scarlett Road and La Rose Avenue.

'Richview' district (and Richview Sideroad) originated in Westmount at Scarlett Road (at the now Eglinton Avenue intersection) and its elevation in the scenic neighbourhood gave birth to the name 'rich'-'view'. Richview Sideroad was changed to Eglinton Avenue in 1970 when a 4-lane bridge was built from the east side of the Humber River to Scarlett Road in Etobicoke. This caused the morphing of Richview Sideroad with Eglinton Avenue, and the name-change. Toronto City planners had hoped to turn Richview Sideroad into The Richview Expressway to connect mid-town Toronto to the western townships down to Hamilton. Local opposition from Westmount/James Gardens/Richmond Gardens districts put up strong and influential fight to eventually kill the plan.

== Character ==
The housing type varies from the 'mansions' of Yorkleigh Avenue and Westmount Park to the more modest; most are low-density single homes. A commercial stretch exists on La Rose Avenue including La Rose plaza which has many stores such as La Rose Bakery, La Rose Dollar Store, and Mel Rose Variety. La Rose Bakery is known among residents to serve excellent European food. Most of the children of the neighbourhood go to either Westmount Public School or All Saints Catholic School.

The major arterial roads of the neighbourhood are Royal York Road to the west, Scarlett Road, which travels north-west to south-east through the neighbourhood and Eglinton Avenue West running east–west to the south.

Toronto Life described Humber Heights the safest neighborhood in Toronto in 2011, with the lowest crime rate of any neighborhood in the Greater Toronto Area.

== History ==
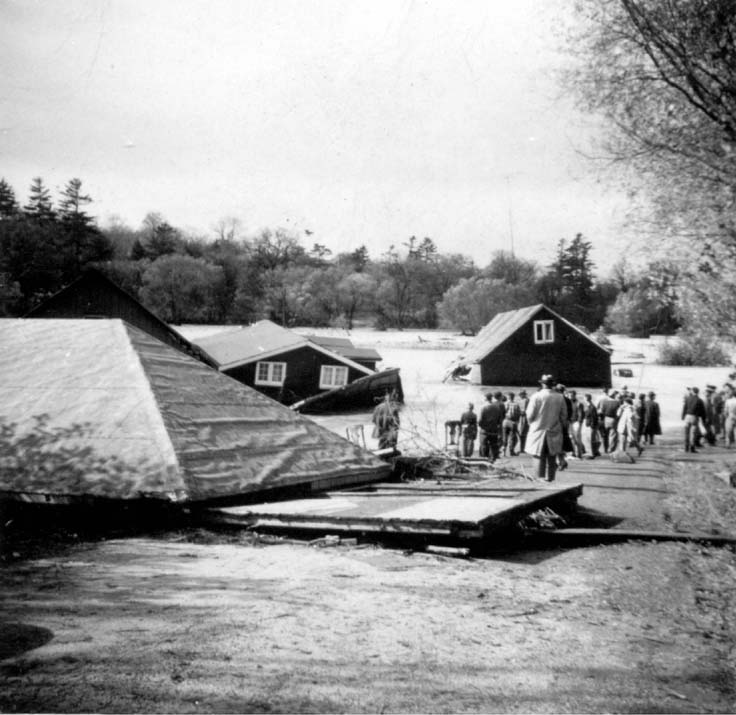
View of the aftermath of Hurricane Hazel, several kilometres from Raymore Drive, where the street of houses were washed away.

Originally the Etobicoke side of York Township's community (later independent town) of Weston which began on the western (Etobicoke) side, the early community (now called Humber Heights) was centred on St Philip's Anglican Church at the top of Royal York Road, one of Etobicoke's first churches. Early settlers traveling north to Albion Township (now in Brampton) would pass through the area.

A very large amount of land comprising the majority of farms lots on both banks of the Humber River between Lambton and Weston were first purchased by the Scarlett family in the 19th century. The first Scarlett estate, 'Runnymede' near York Township's community of Lambton, was connected by an, originally private, road (now called Scarlett Road) to the three estates owned by his sons on the Etobicoke side; the street crossing the Humber River into Etobicoke near Eglinton Avenue (then called Richview Road, a small section with this name remains). As new families, many related to the Scarletts', purchased land in the area, the Etobicoke community of 'Humbervale' appeared in the late 19th century along Scarlett Road, parallel to the Humber River, from the Humber Creek in the north to where Scarlett Road crosses over the Humber River to the south (near Eglinton and La Rose Avenues).

=== Development ===
Humbervale is best known as the site of Raymore Drive, a street washed out during Hurricane Hazel with the loss of many lives. Much low-density residential was built on former farmland as many immigrants from Italy and some eastern-European countries, settled in the rapidly urbanising Etobicoke during the 1960s. All Saints Catholic Church and St Demetrius Byzantine Catholic church and school (1975) as well as a small commercial area were established on La Rose Avenue (parallel to and just north of the long undeveloped Eglinton Avenue) to serve the growing population. The original 1858 La Rose family farm house still stands on La Rose Avenue near Islington as well as a number of other historic buildings throughout the neighbourhood. A large collection of early photographs of Humbervale became one of the largest components of Etobicoke's 'History Room' when it was established in 1985 at Richview Library. Recent high-density development is now taking place along Eglinton Avenue such as the 'Royal York Grand' condominium.

== Demographics ==
Major ethnic populations (2016):

- 67.2% White; 21.0% Italian, 9.1% Ukrainian
- 10.5% Black
- 4.4% Latin American (of any race)
- 3.0% South Asian
- 2.5% East Indian

== Schools ==
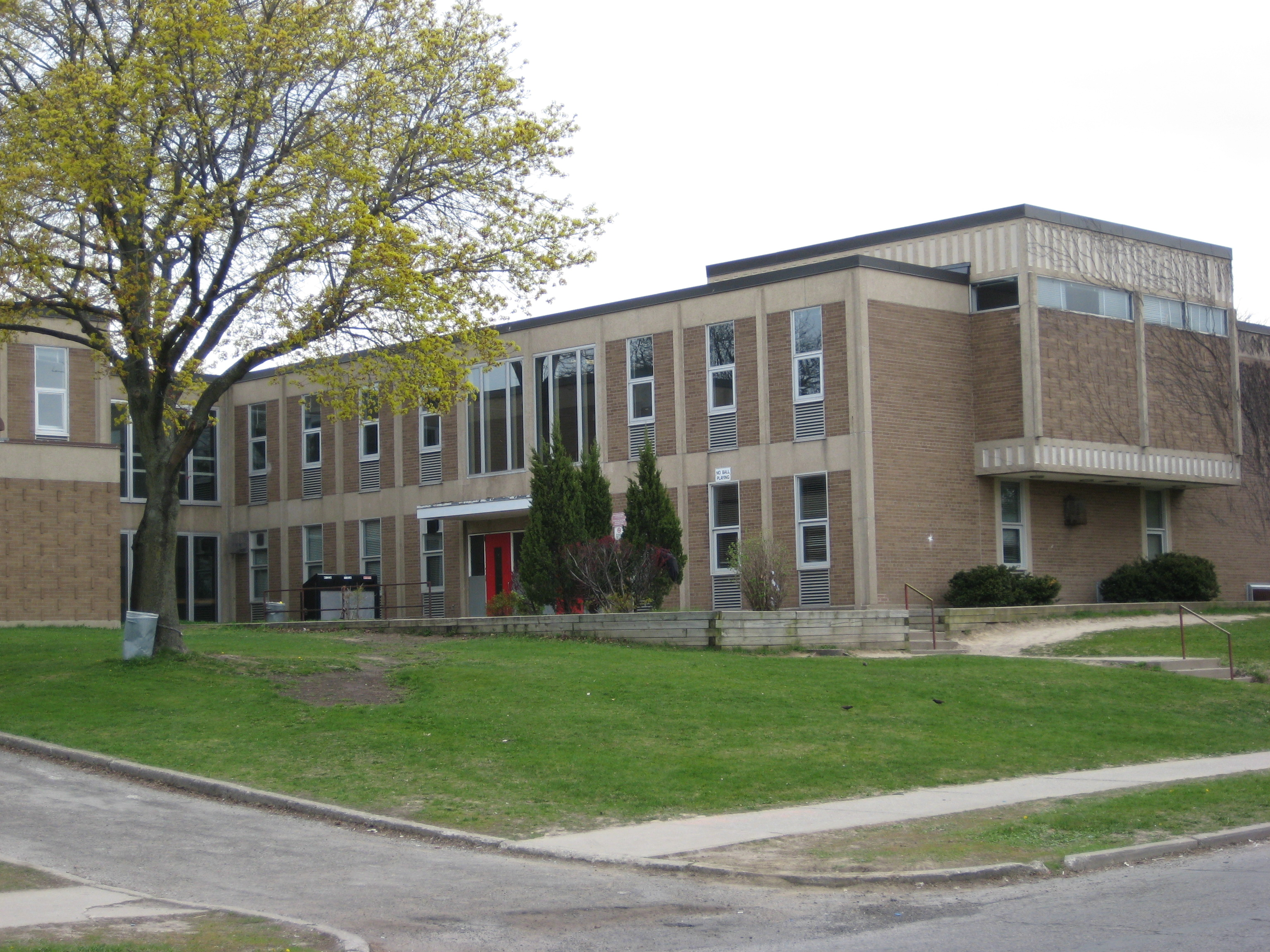
Scarlett Heights Entrepreneurial Academy is a secondary school in the neighbourhood.

- Scarlett Heights Entrepreneurial Academy, formerly known as Scarlett Heights Collegiate Institute, a that school existed from 1963 to 2018. It is now a holding school for York Memorial Collegiate Institute.
- St. Demetrius Elementary School is a primary school on La Rose Avenue. It is one of three Ukrainian Catholic schools within the Toronto Catholic District School Board. It was founded in 1975 as a result of the pastor of St. Demetrius Ukrainian Catholic Church, Rt. Rev. John Tataryn, who recognized the need to ensure the future of the Ukrainian Catholic community by providing its children with the opportunity to learn about their heritage.
- Westmount Junior School is a public elementary school on Chapman Road near Royal York Road and Eglinton Avenue. It opened in January 1960.
- All Saints Catholic Elementary School (est. 1962)

== Institutions ==
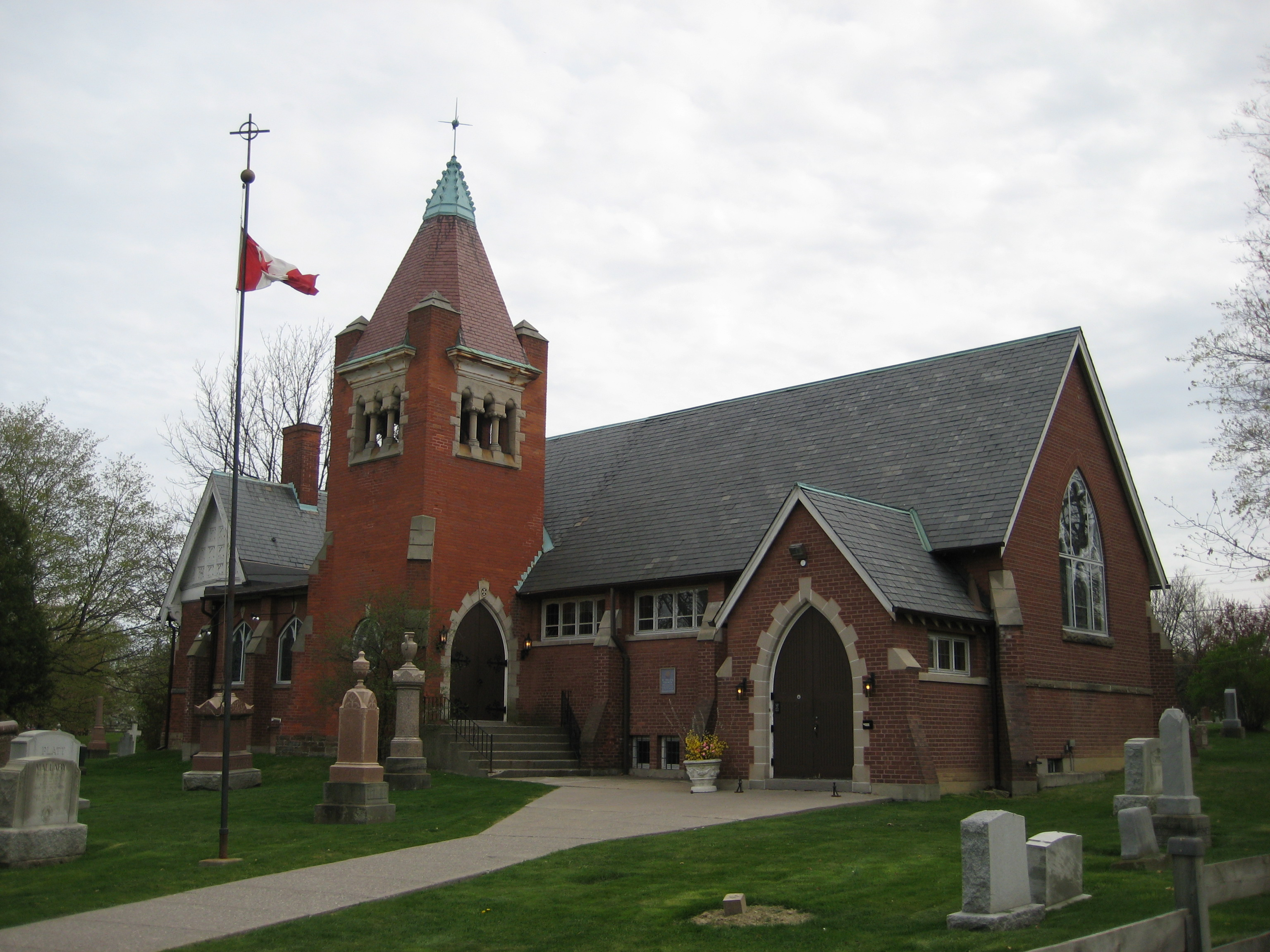
St. Philips Anglican Church is one of several churches located in the neighbourhood.

- Riverside Cemetery
- Royal York Plaza
- La Rose Plaza

=== Recreation ===
- Douglas B. Ford Park - formerly Weston Woods Park
- LaRose Park
- Scarlett Heights Park
- Top of Richview
- Westmount Park
- Weston Golf & Country Club

=== Churches ===
- St Philips Anglican Church (est. 1830)
- St Andrews Presbyterian Church, Humber Heights (est. 1951)
- St Demetrius Byzantine Catholic Church (est. 1959)
- All Saints Roman Catholic Church
- Westmount Gospel Hall
