= Corso Italia-Davenport =

- Neighbourhood
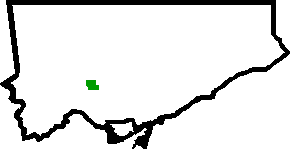
- Corso Italia-Davenport in green

- Location within Toronto
- Coordinates: 43.677°N 79.447°W
- Country: Canada
- Province: Ontario
- City: Toronto

Population (2021)
  - Total: 13,200
  - Density: 7,478/km^{2} (19,370/sq mi)

Corso Italia-Davenport is a neighbourhood in central Toronto, Ontario, Canada. Its boundaries, according to the City of Toronto, are the CNR tracks to the west, Morrison Avenue to the north, Westmount Avenue to the east on the northern portion and Oakwood Avenue to the east on the southern portion, and on the south by Davenport Road. Within this official neighbourhood of the City of Toronto are several neighbourhoods, Corso Italia, Davenport, Earlscourt, and Regal Heights.

== Demographics ==
Total population (2021): 13,200

Major ethnic populations (2021):

- 73.1% White; 20.2% Portuguese, 16.7% Italian, 10.3% English, 10.1% Irish, 9.4% Scottish, 6.6% Canadians
- 7.6% Latin American (of any race)
- 6.2% Black
- 2.1% South Asian

Total population (2016): 14,133

Major ethnic populations (2016):

- 75.9% White; 26.1% Portuguese, 20.7% Italian, 11.6% Canadians, 11.6% English, 10.6% Irish, 8.8% Scottish
- 8.1% Latin American (of any race)
- 4.6% Black
- 2.3% South Asian

Total population (2011): 13,743

Major ethnic populations (2011):

- 71.0% White; 27.5% Portuguese, 19.9% Italian, 10.6% Canadians, 8.5% English, 7.8% Irish
- 10.1% Latin American (of any race)
- 6.2% Black
- 2.2% South Asian

Total population (2006): 14,330

Major ethnic populations (2006):

- 76.0% White; 30.7% Portuguese, 27.6% Italian, 12.5% English, 5.0% Irish, 4.9% Scottish, 5.4% Canadians
- 8.8% Latin American (of any race)
- 4.8% Black
- 2.3% South Asian

Total population (2001): 16,180

Major ethnic populations (2001):

- 77.1% White; 30.2% Italian, 24.6% Portuguese, 9.4% Canadians, 5.0% Irish, 4.9% Scottish
- 8.3% Latin American (of any race)
- 5.6% Black
- 1.8% South Asian
