= Humbermede =

Coordinates: 43°44′46.67″N 79°32′28.27″W

- Neighbourhood
- Residences in Humbermede

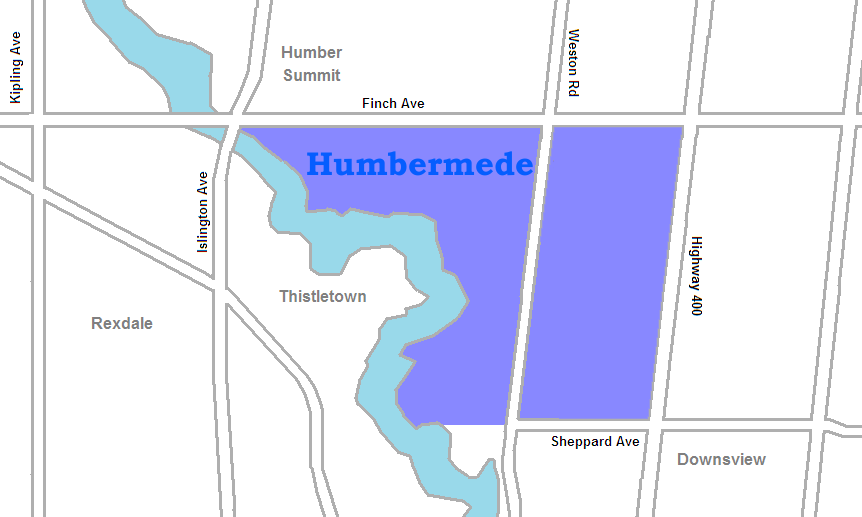
- Country: Canada
- Province: Ontario
- City: Toronto
- Municipality established: 1850 York Township
- Changed municipality: 1922 North York from York Township
- Changed municipality: 1998 Toronto from North York

Government
  - MP: Judy Sgro
  - MPP: Tom Rakocevic
  - Councillor: Anthony Perruzza

Population (2016)
  - Total: 15,545

Humbermede, often called Emery after a former rural hamlet that was located in the area, is a neighbourhood of Toronto, Ontario, Canada. Humbermede, like many of the "Humber" neighbourhoods in the city, gets its name from the Humber River. It is bounded on the west by the Humber River, on the north by Finch Avenue West, on the east by the Highway 400 and on the south by Sheppard Avenue West.

== History ==
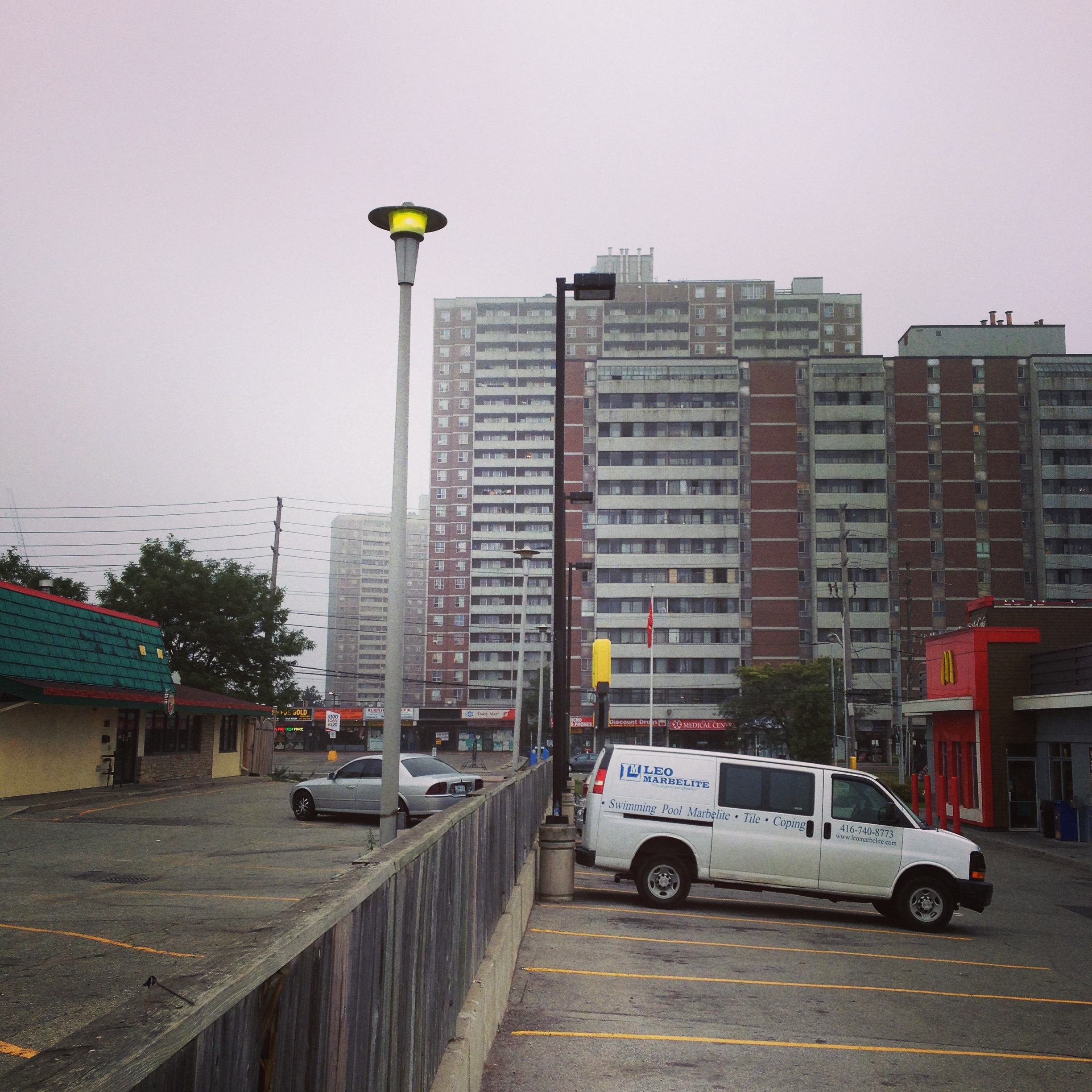
Several high-rises were built near Finch Avenue and Weston Road.

A farming hamlet developed by 1870 at the crossroads of Finch Avenue and Weston Road, named Dayton. A Dayton railway station at Finch Avenue and a Dayton post office were opened around that time. It was changed to Emery. One reason suggested for the change was to avoid confusion with Dayton, Ohio. By 1960, the area started being converted to urban uses, as part of North York.

The neighbourhood has since developed into a suburban low-density neighbourhood primarily consisting of semi-detached homes, although some high-rises on the southwest corner of Finch and Weston Road were also built. On the south-east corner is site of the former Finch West Mall. There is an industrial area along the rail lines, extending east to Highway 400.

== Education ==
Two public school boards operate schools in Humbermede, the separate Toronto Catholic District School Board (TCDSB), and the secular Toronto District School Board (TDSB). Both TCDSB, and TDSB operate public elementary schools in the neighbourhood. TCDSB operates St. Jude Catholic School, whereas TDSB operate Daystrom Public School, and Gulfstream Public School. TDSB is the only public school board to operate a secondary school in Humbermede, Emery Collegiate Institute.

TCDSB does not operate a secondary school in the neighbourhood, with TCSDB secondary school students residing in Humbermede attending institutions in adjacent neighbourhoods. The French first language public secular school board, Conseil scolaire Viamonde, and it separate counterpart, Conseil scolaire catholique MonAvenir also offer schooling to applicable residents of Humbermede, although they do not operate a school in the neighbourhood. CSCM and CSV students attend schools situated in other neighbourhoods in Toronto.

== Demographics ==
Humbermede is ethnically one of the most diverse neighbourhoods in Toronto, with one of the highest proportions of Latin Americans in Canada.

Major ethnic populations (2016):

- 22.9% White; 10.5% Italian, 4.1% British
- 22.1% Black; 7.9% Jamaican, 2.2% Nigerian
- 21.1% South Asian; 14.4% Indian, 5.5% Pakistani
- 11.8% Latin American; 3.1% Ecuadorian, 2.2% Salvadoran
- 7% Southeast Asian; 6.4% Vietnamese

== Recreation ==
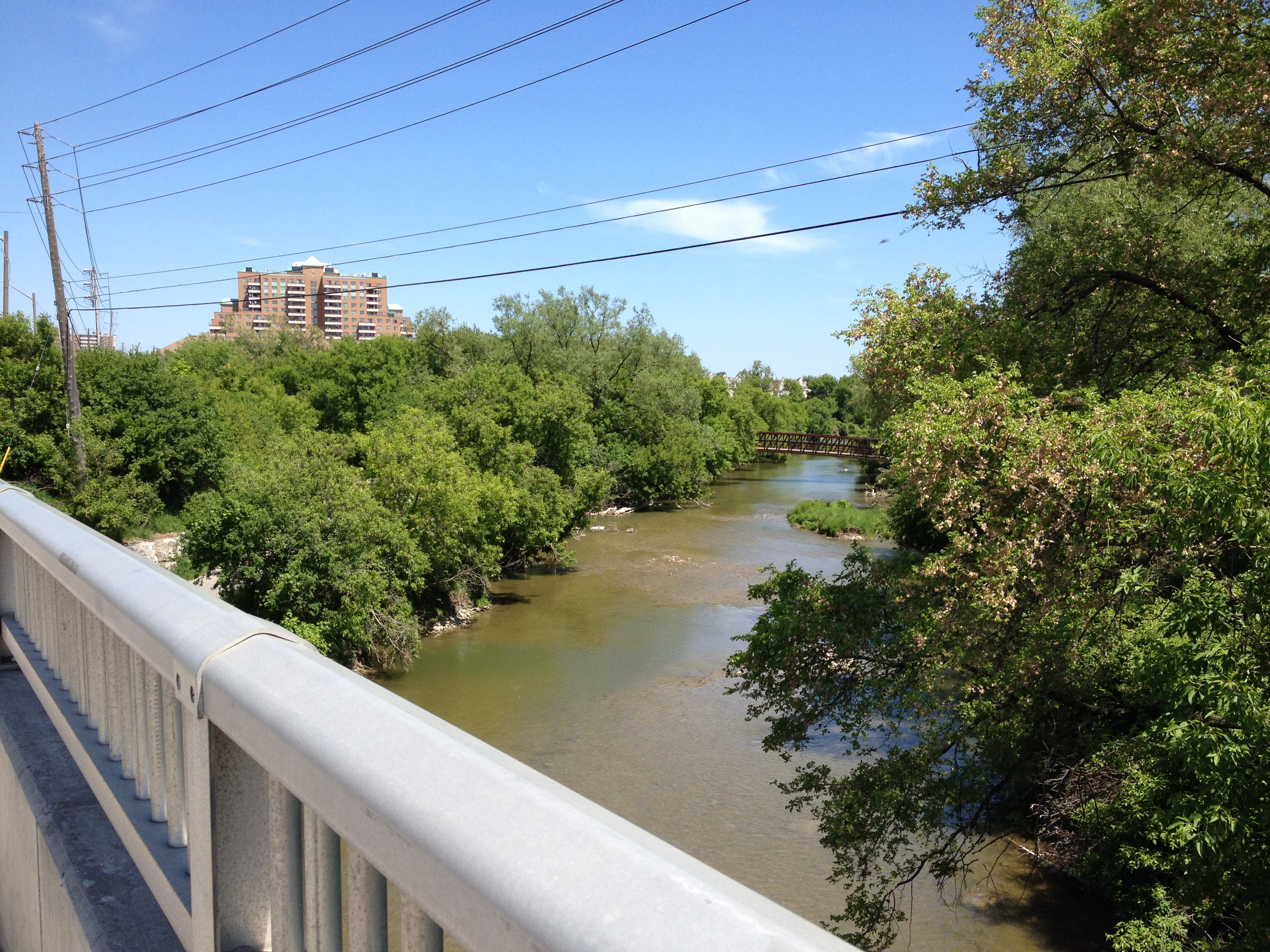
The Humber River near Finch Islington Park. Several parks in Humbermede are located near the Humber River, and its valley.

The neighbourhood is home to several municipal parks and green spaces, including Bluehaven Park, Habitant Park, and Summerlea Park. Many of these parks are situated near the Humber Valley, which forms a part of the larger Toronto ravine system. Municipal parks in Humbermede are managed by the Toronto Parks, Forestry and Recreation Division. The division also manages the Carmine Stefano Community Centre, located in the southern portion of the neighbourhood, on Weston Road. The Toronto Public Library also operates the Woodview Park branch in Humbermede.

== Transportation ==
The neighbourhood is bounded by several major roadways, Finch Avenue West to the north, and Sheppard Avenue to the south. Highway 400 is a major north-south controlled access highway that bounds the neighbourhood from the east. Weston Road is another north-south road that passes through the neighbourhood.

Public transportation in Humbermede is provided by the Toronto Transit Commission (TTC). The TTC operates Line 6 Finch West, a light rail transit line running in a private right of way along Finch Avenue, and several bus routes through the neighborhood.
