= Princess Gardens =

- Neighbourhood
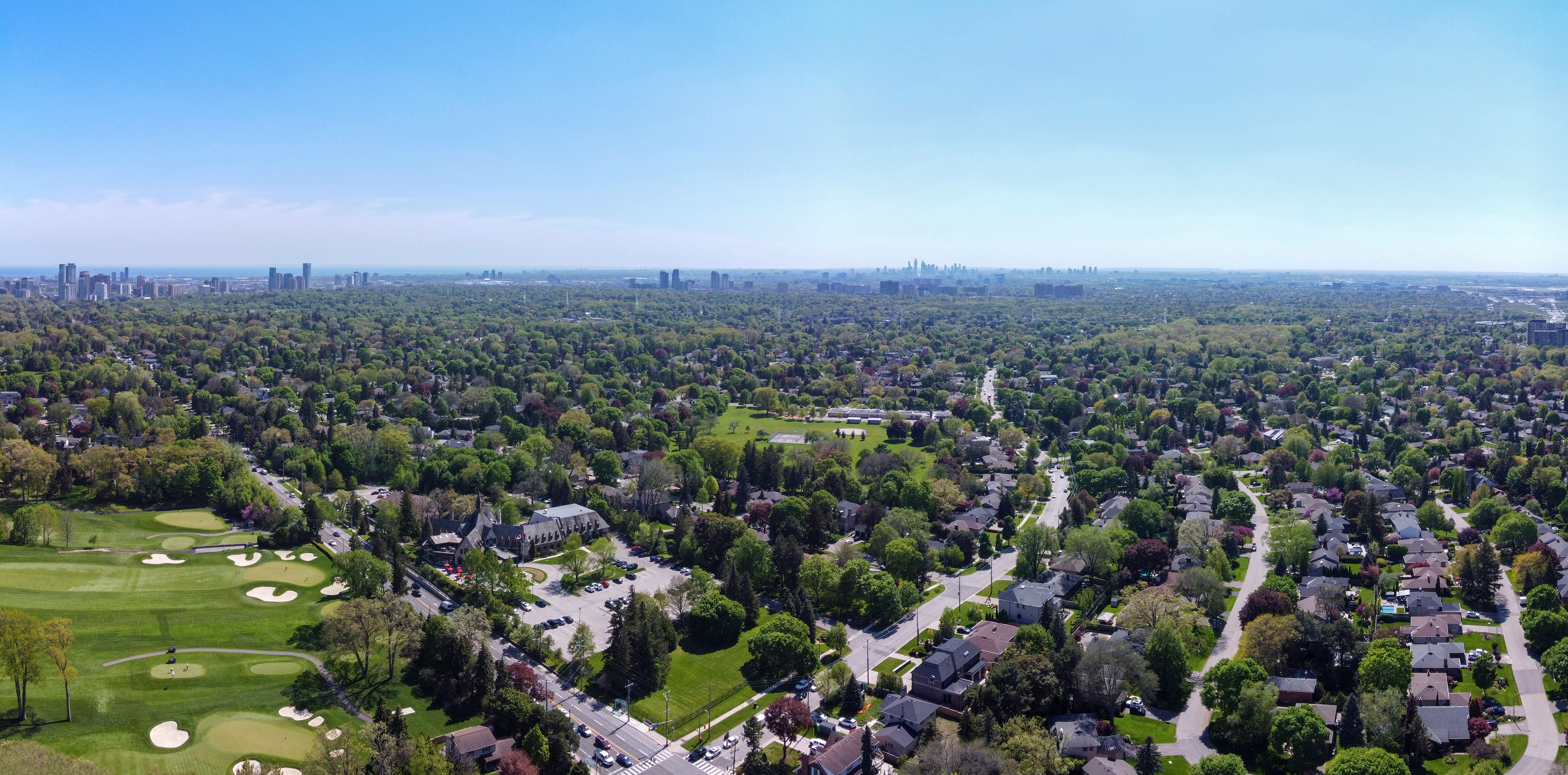
- Aerial view of Princess Gardens from Islington Ave at Poplar Heights Dr

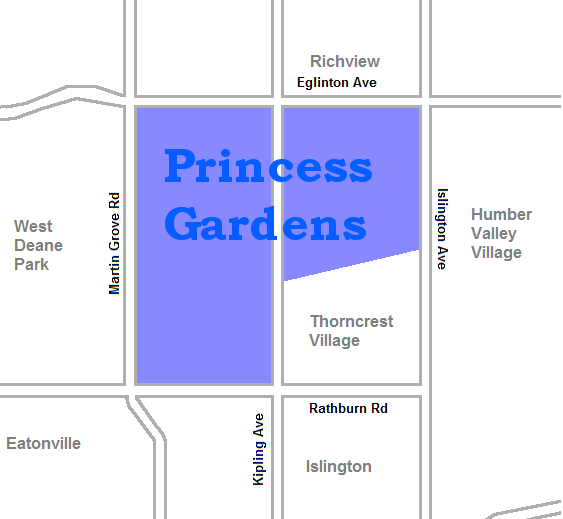
- Coordinates: 43°40′13″N 79°32′28″W
- Country: Canada
- Province: Ontario
- City: Toronto
- Established: 1946 (Subdivision) 'Thorncrest'
- Changed Municipality: 1998 Toronto from Etobicoke

Government
  - MP: Yvan Baker (Etobicoke Centre)
  - MPP: Kinga Surma (Etobicoke Centre)
  - Councillor: Stephen Holyday (Ward 2)

Princess Gardens is a neighbourhood in Toronto, Ontario, Canada. It is located in the western area of Toronto that was formerly the City of Etobicoke. Its boundaries are Eglinton Avenue to the north, Martin Grove to the west, Islington to the east, and Rathburn Road to the south. The southeastern part of this area is the separate neighbourhood of Thorncrest Village. The neighbourhood is divided into two areas: The portion east of Kipling Road is known as Princess Anne Manor, while the portion west of Kipling is Princess Margaret Gardens. They are named after Princess Anne, Princess Royal, and Princess Margaret, Countess of Snowdon, the daughter and sister of the late Queen Elizabeth II respectively. Both Princesses visited the Gardens and opened up Princess Margaret Public School during its opening ceremony. The southwestern part of the neighbourhood is also sometimes known as Glen Agar. Princess Gardens has some of the highest income Canadians in the Greater Toronto Area according to a 2016 census, at an average of $222,218 per year.

== Character ==
This is a post-war developed residential area. Its main street is Eglinton Avenue, a four-lane arterial road running east–west along the north of the neighbourhood. Residential subdivisions back onto Eglinton along this stretch. North-south are Martin Grove, Kipling and Islington Avenues, all four-lane arterial roads with detached homes on both sides. The density of the housing is very low, and road patterns are generally curved roads leading into cul-de-sacs to reduce traffic.

Largely built along an extension of the street 'The Kingsway' north of Dundas St, the area developed in a radically different manner than 'The Kingsway' neighbourhood to the south after the northern extension of the Kingsway was cut off from the south with the construction of a highway-style interchange at Dundas and Royal York. Like 'the Kingsway' neighbourhood to the south, many streets in Princess Gardens carry 'royal' names: The Kingsway, Prince George Dr, Princess Margaret Blvd, Princess Anne Cr.

== Education ==
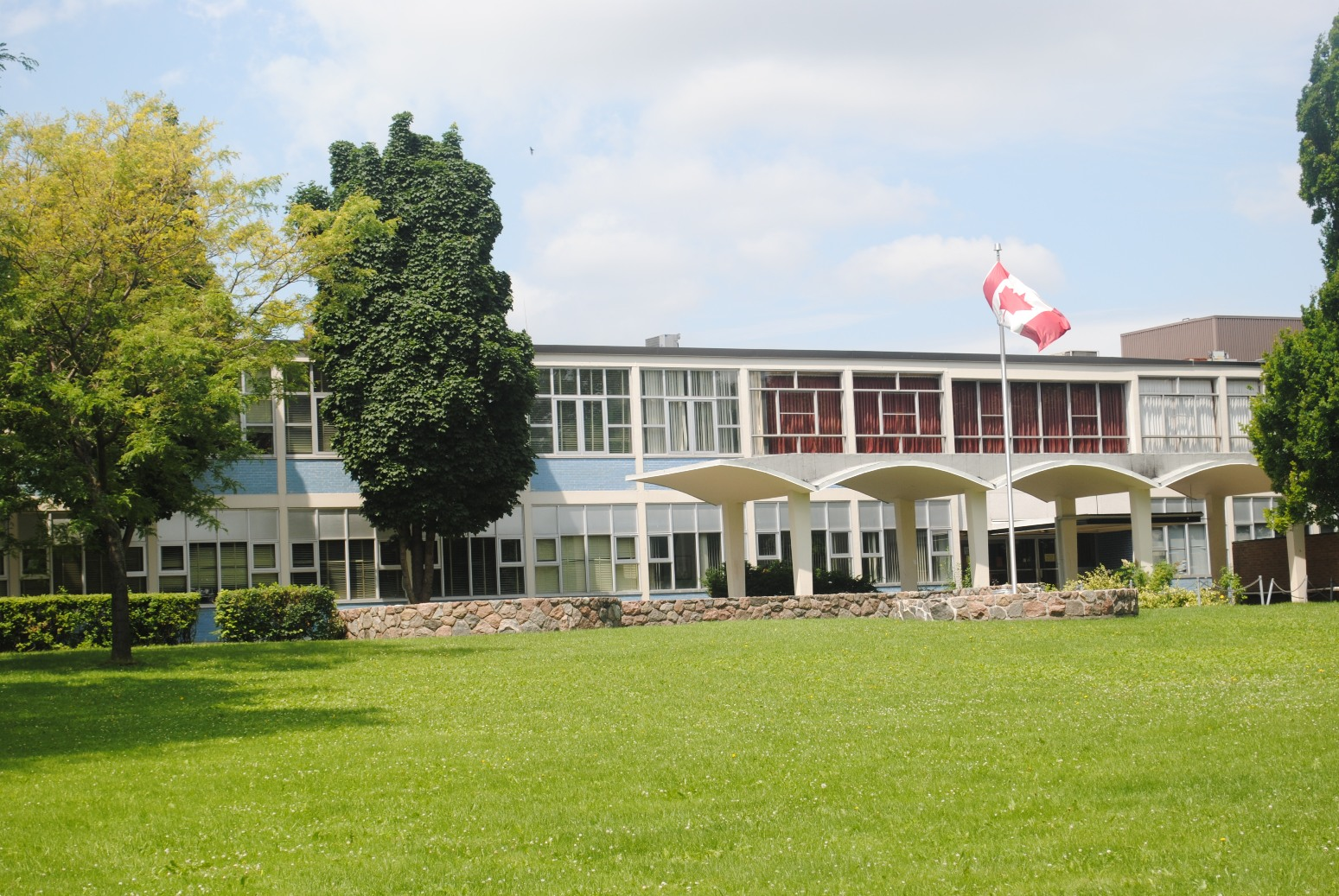
Richview Collegiate Institute is a secondary school located in Princess Gardens.

The neighbourhood is home to schools operated by the public Toronto District School Board (TDSB), and the Toronto Catholic District School Board (TCDSB). TDSB is the only public school board that operates secondary schools in Princess Gardens, Martingrove Collegiate Institute and Richview Collegiate Institute.

TDSB and TCDSB elementary schools located in Princess Gardens include:

- John G. Althouse Middle School is a middle school located in Toronto, Ontario, near the intersection of Lloyd Manor Drive and Princess Margaret Boulevard.
- St George's Junior School is a public elementary school on Princess Anne Crescent, located in the Princess Anne Manor community on the south side of Princess Margaret Boulevard. The school first opened in 1956 and expanded in 1960 to include additional classroom space.
- Rosethorn Junior School is a public elementary school on Remington Drive, located close to the intersection of Rathburn Road and Kipling Avenue. It first opened in 1952 as a kindergarten to grade 8 school, but was closed in 1984 because of declining enrolment. It reopened in September 1996 as a French Immersion kindergarten to grade 5 school.
- St Gregory Catholic Elementary School

In addition to public schooling, the neighbourhood is also home to Phoenix Montessori School, a private Montessori school.

== Institutions ==
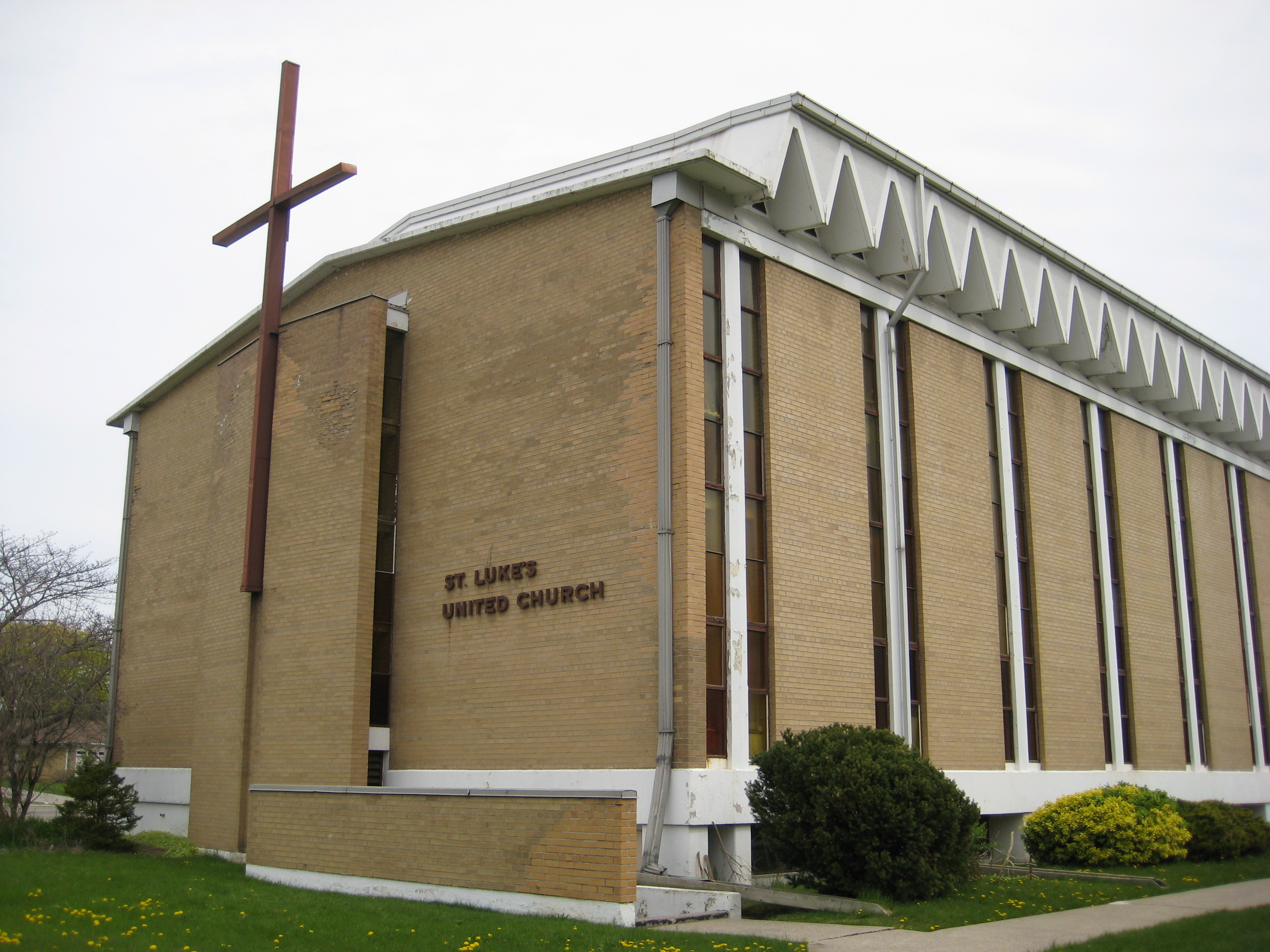
St. Luke's United Church is a place of worship located in the neighbourhood.

- St. George's Golf and Country Club (Hosted the Canadian Open 6 times) and the Canadian Women’s Open 5 times. The club and course were designed by Stanley Thompson
- Princess Anne Park
- Princess Margaret Park
- Rosethorn Park

=== Churches ===
- St Luke's United Church
- St Gregory Roman Catholic Church

== Notable current and former residents ==
- Doug Ford, 26th Premier of Ontario, Former Toronto city councillor, businessman
- Krista Haynes, former Lingerie Football Player in Lingerie Football League best known for being the daughter of Premier Doug Ford.

== See also ==
- Royal eponyms in Canada
