= Pelmo Park-Humberlea =

- Neighbourhood
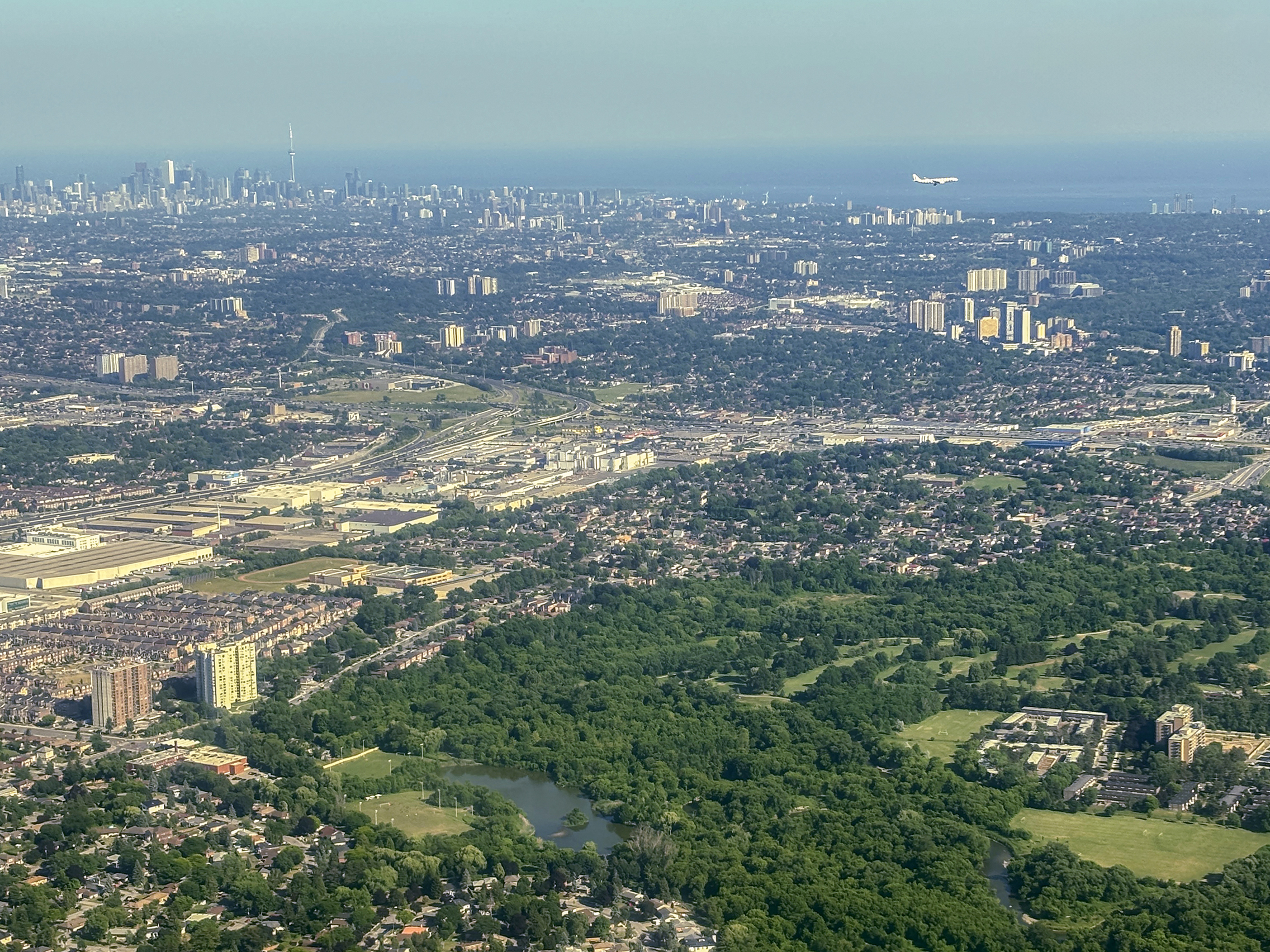
- Aerial view of Pelmo Park-Humberlea in 2025

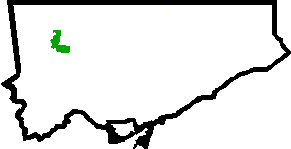
- Location of Pelmo Park-Humberlea within Toronto
- Coordinates: 43°43′0″N 79°31′40″W
- Country: Canada
- Province: Ontario
- City: Toronto
- Municipality established: 1850 York Township
- Changed municipality: 1922 North York from York Township
- Changed municipality: 1998 Toronto from North York

Government
  - MP: Judy Sgro (York West)
  - MPP: Mario Sergio (York West)
  - Councillor: Giorgio Mammoliti (Ward 7 York West)

Population (2021)
  - Total: 11,290
  - Density: 2,547/km^{2} (6,600/sq mi)

Pelmo Park-Humberlea is a neighbourhood in Toronto, Ontario, Canada. It is located north-west of the central core, in the former suburb of North York. Many of the neighbourhoods in this quadrant of the city can aptly be described as family neighbourhoods with access to parks, green space and a slower pace than found closer to downtown.

As its name implies, it is composed of two geographic areas, the first being the Pelmo Park area which is bordered by the 401 to the north, Woodward Avenue to the south, Jane Street to the east and the CNR rail tracks to the west. The second area, Humberlea, is centred on Weston Road and bordered by Sheppard Avenue west to the north, Oak Street to the south, the CNR rail tracks to the east and the Humber River to the west.

== Education ==
Two public school boards operate schools in Pelmo Park – Humberlea, the separate Toronto Catholic District School Board (TCDSB), and the secular Toronto District School Board (TDSB).

Both TCDSB, and TDSB operate public elementary schools in the neighbourhood. TCDSB operates St. Simon Catholic School, whereas TDSB operate Pelmo Park Public School. TCDSB is the only public school board to operate a secondary school in Pelmo Park – Humberlea, St. Basil-the-Great College School.

TDSB does not operate a secondary school in the neighbourhood, with TDSB secondary school students residing in Pelmo Park – Humberlea attending institutions in adjacent neighbourhoods. The French first language public secular school board, Conseil scolaire Viamonde, and its separate counterpart, Conseil scolaire catholique MonAvenir also offer schooling to applicable residents of Pelmo Park – Humberlea, although they do not operate a school in the neighbourhood. CSCM and CSV students attend schools situated in other neighbourhoods in Toronto.

== Demographics ==
The population of Pelmo Park-Humberlea in 2021 was: 11,290

Major ethnic populations (2021):

- 47.8% White; 22.1% Italian, 9.3% Portuguese
- 14.5% Black; 3.5% Jamaican
- 7.7% Latin American (of any race)
- 7.4% South Asian
- 6.7% Filipino
- 3.7% East Indian

The population of Pelmo Park-Humberlea in 2016 was: 10,722

Major ethnic populations (2016):

- 56.3% White; 26.6% Italian, 8.6% Portuguese
- 11.2% Black; 5.2% Jamaican
- 7.6% Latin American (of any race)
- 6.6% South Asian
- 4.5% Filipino
- 3.8% East Indian

The population of Pelmo Park-Humberlea in 2011 was: 8,710

Major ethnic populations (2011):

- 62.0% White; 34.0% Italian
- 10.9% Black
- 5.5% South Asian
- 5.4% Latin American (of any race)
- 4.9% East Indian
- 2.6% Filipino

The population of Pelmo Park-Humberlea in 2006 was: 8,720

Major ethnic populations (2006):

- 63.5% White; 34.2% Italian, 4.5% Portuguese
- 10.8% Black; 4.3% Jamaican
- 7.6% South Asian
- 6.2% Latin American (of any race)
- 4.6% East Indian
- 3.5% Filipino

The population of Pelmo Park-Humberlea in 2001 was: 8,080

Major ethnic populations (2001):

- 68.9% White; 40.4% Italian, 4.3% Portuguese
- 8.4% Black
- 3.8% South Asian
- 2.5% Latin American (of any race)
- 1.9% Filipino

== Recreation ==
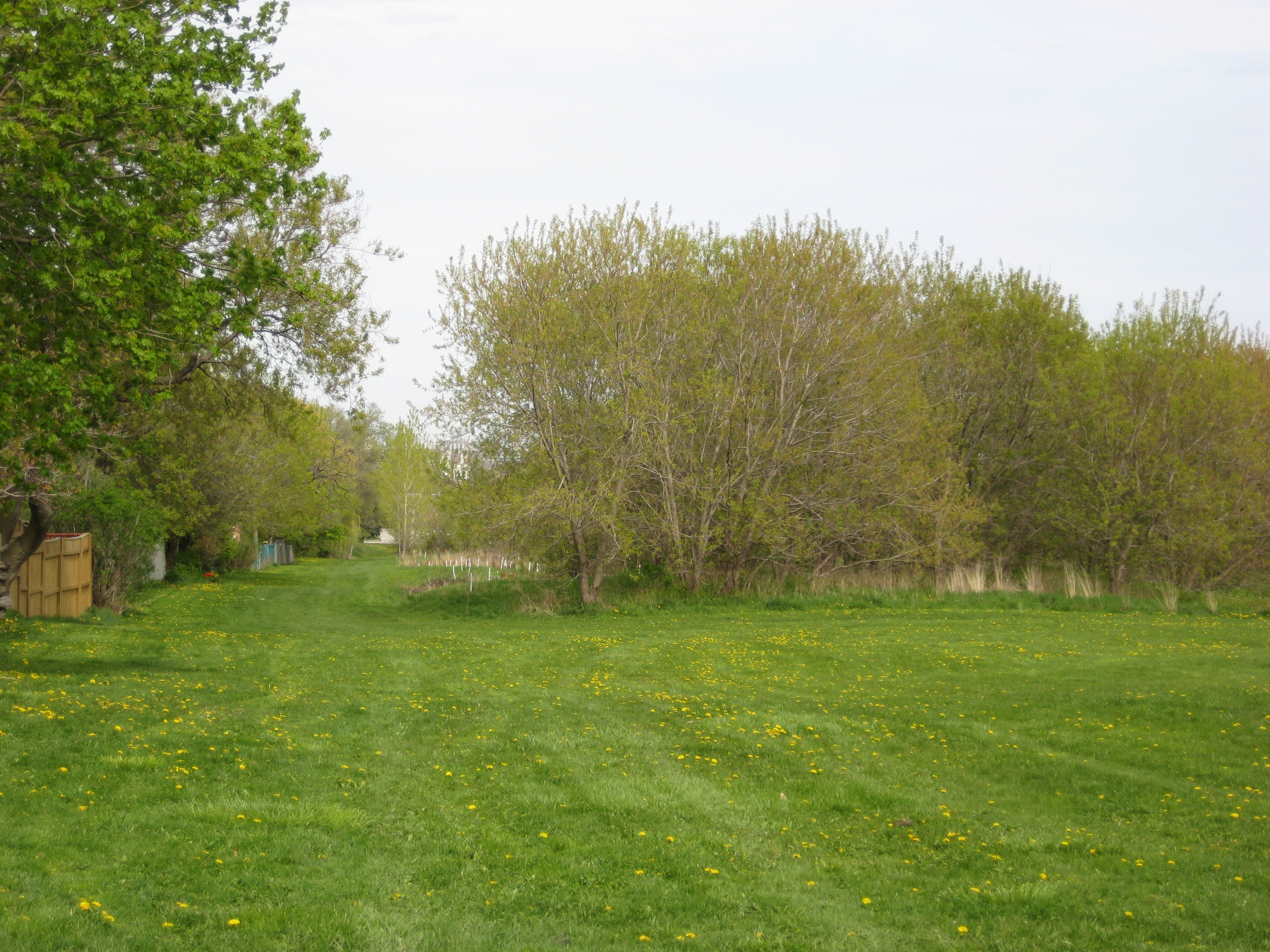
Pine Point Park is a municipal park situated in the neighbourhood.

Several municipal parks are located in Pelmo Park – Humberlea including Crawford-Jones Memorial Park, Pelmo Park, Pine Point Park, Strathburn Park, and Wallace C. Swanek Park. A number of these parks are situated next to the Humber Valley, which forms a part of the larger Toronto ravine system. Municipal parks are managed by the Toronto Parks, Forestry and Recreation Division. In addition to municipal parks, the division also manages a community centre in the neighbourhood, Pelmo Park Community Centre.

== Transportation ==
Several major roadways bound Pelmo Park – Humberlea. Sheppard Avenue bounds the neighbourhood to the north, whereas portions of Albion Road, and Weston Road bound the neighbourhood to the west. Highway 400 is a controlled access highway that bounds the neighbourhood to the east. Highway 401 is another east–west highway that bisects the neighbourhood, serving as a dividing line between Humberlea and Pelmo Park. Both highways provide access to other neighbourhoods in the city, the Greater Toronto Area, and southern Ontario.

Public transportation is provided by the Toronto Transit Commission (TTC). The TTC operates several bus routes throughout the neighbourhood.

== See also ==
- List of neighbourhoods in Toronto
