= Amesbury, Toronto =

Amesbury
- Neighbourhood
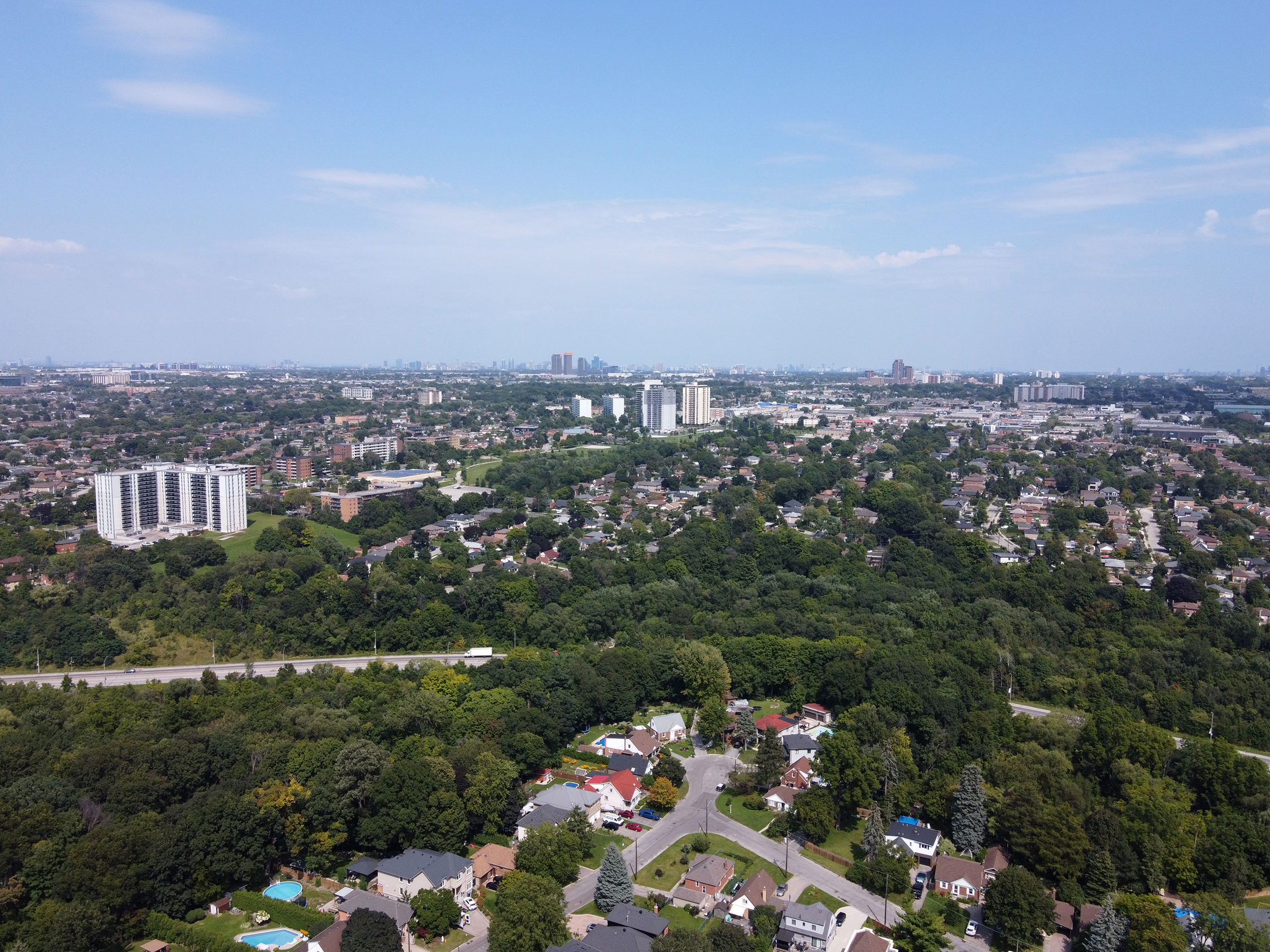
- Aerial view of Amesbury from Brookhaven in 2024

- Location in Ontario
- Coordinates: 43°42′02″N 79°29′25″W
- Country: Canada
- Province: Ontario
- City: Toronto
- Established: 1922 North York from York; 1998 Toronto from North York

Government
  - MPP: Kathleen Wynne (Don Valley West)
  - Councillor: Denzil Minnan-Wong (Ward 34 Don Valley West)

Population (2006)
  - Total: 17,325
- Time zone: UTC−5 (EST)
  - Summer (DST): UTC−4 (EDT)
- Postal code: M6M
- Area codes: 416, 647

Amesbury or Brookhaven-Amesbury is a neighbourhood in Toronto, Ontario, Canada. The neighbourhood is located in northern Toronto in the former suburb of North York. It is part of federal and provincial electoral district York South—Weston, and Toronto electoral wards 11: York South—Weston (West) and 12: York South—Weston (East).

== Character ==
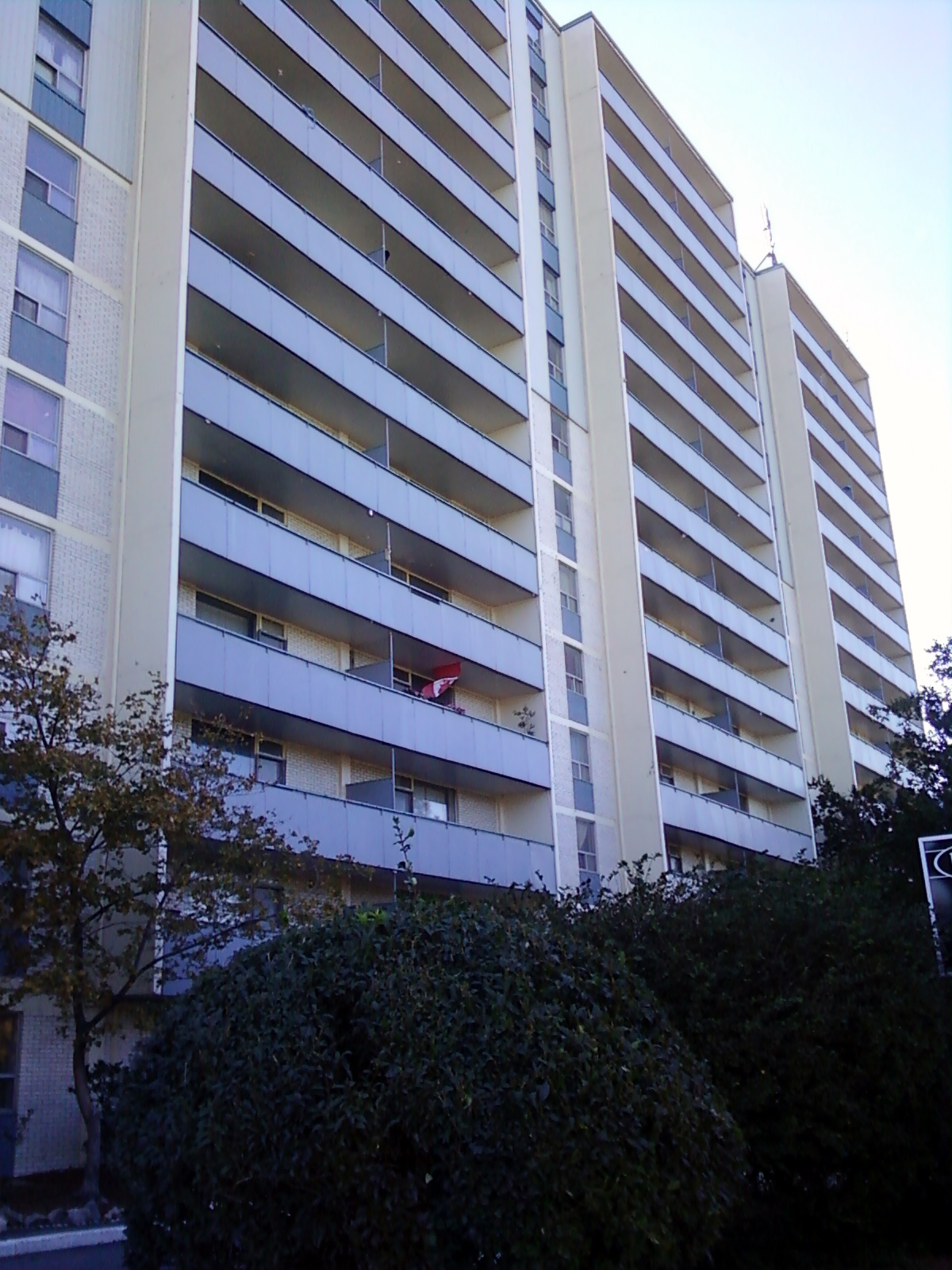
High-rises make up most of the residential housing available in the neighbourhood.

Its borders are inexact. It is usually assumed to lie between Lawrence Avenue on the north, Jane Street and the railway line adjacent to Weston Road (which includes land west of Jane) on the west, Keele Street on the east, and a hydro right of way, which also marks the southern border of North York, on the south.

The area west of Jane Street is known as Brookhaven. The City of Toronto's demographic page refers to that area as Brookhaven-Amesbury, but omits the area north of Lawrence Avenue, and includes the largely industrial area between Keele Street and the railway. This area had a 2006 population of 17,325.

The majority of the housing available is still high rises (over 60%), and many are low-income rental units. Specifically for Census Tract 5350280.00, in 2006 there were more households with renters than owners; 1070 owners and 1750 renters. In the 2011 National Household Survey, Census Tract 5350280.00 reported 1080 household with owners and 1815 households with renters.

== Demographics ==
The mother language spoken (other than English) in this neighbourhood is an official language. Spanish is the most prevalent, then Portuguese, Italian, and then, Vietnamese. The most spoken home language (other than English) is Spanish, then Portuguese, Vietnamese, Italian, and then, Tagalog. Italian is the most largest ethnic origin succeeded by Portuguese, then Jamaican .

== Education ==
Two public school boards operate schools in Amesbury, the separate Toronto Catholic District School Board (TCDSB), and the secular Toronto District School Board (TDSB). Both TCDSB, and TDSB operate two public elementary schools in the neighbourhood. TCDSB operates Immaculate Conception Catholic School, and St. Bernard Catholic School; whereas TDSB operate Brookhaven Public School, and George Anderson Public School.

Neither school board operate a secondary school in the neighbourhood, with secondary school students residing in Amesbury attending institutions in adjacent neighbourhoods. The French first language public secular school board, Conseil scolaire Viamonde, and it separate counterpart, Conseil scolaire catholique MonAvenir also offer schooling to applicable residents of Amesbury, although they do not operate a school in the neighbourhood. CSCM and CSV students attend schools situated in other neighbourhoods in Toronto.

== Recreation ==
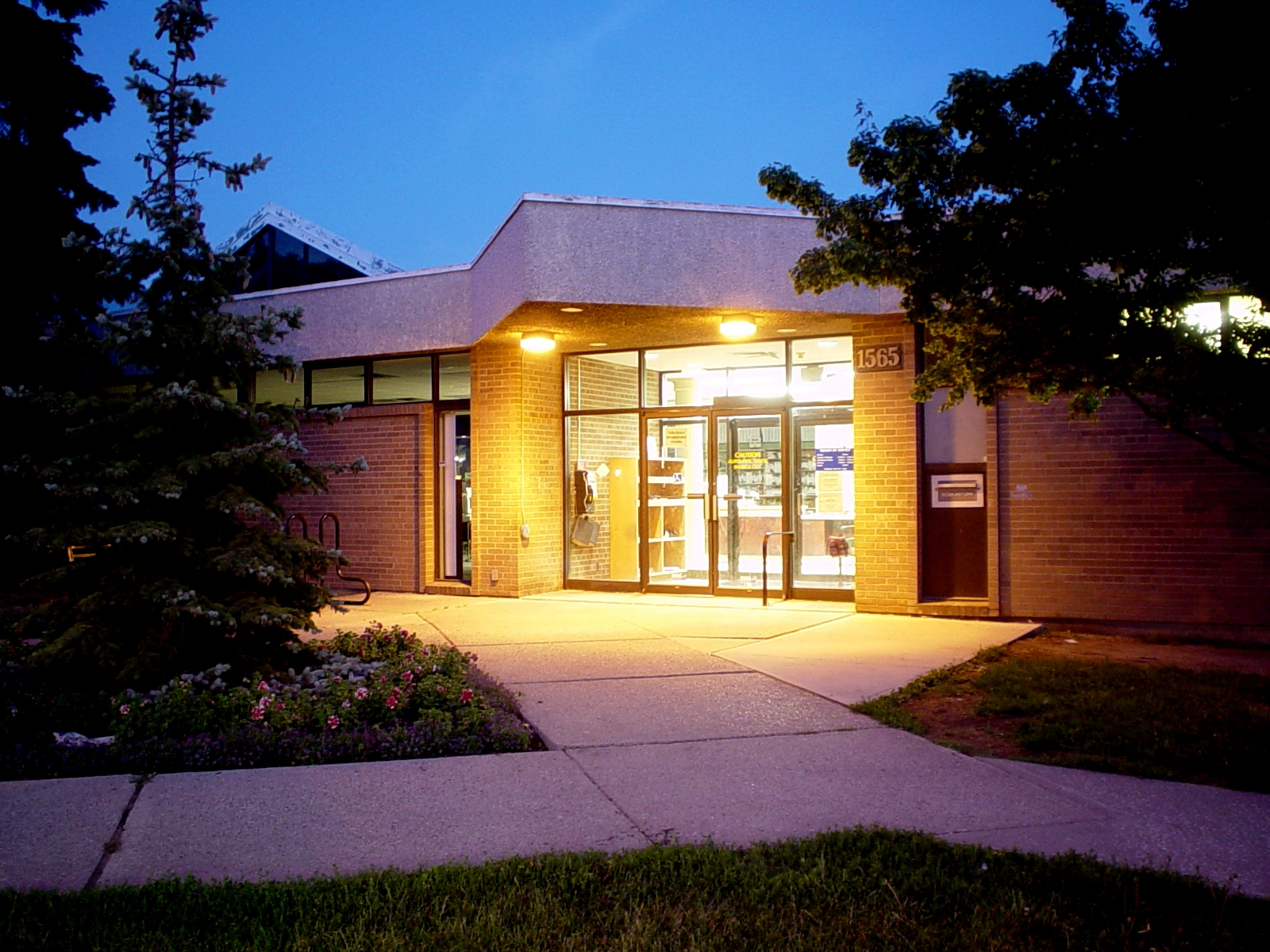
Amesbury branch of the Toronto Public Library is located in the neighbourhood.

Several municipal parks are situated in Amesbury, including Amesbury Park, Harding Park, Redbank Greenbelt, Trethewey Parks, and Westview Greenbelt. A number of these parks and green spaces are situated near Black Creek, and its valleys, which form a part of the Toronto ravine system. Municipal parks in the neighbourhood are managed by the Toronto Parks, Forestry and Recreation Division. The division also operates a community centre, Amesbury Community Centre.

The Amesbury branch of the Toronto Public Library is also situated in Amesbury, on Lawrence Avenue.
