= Maple Leaf, Toronto =

Maple Leaf
- Neighbourhood
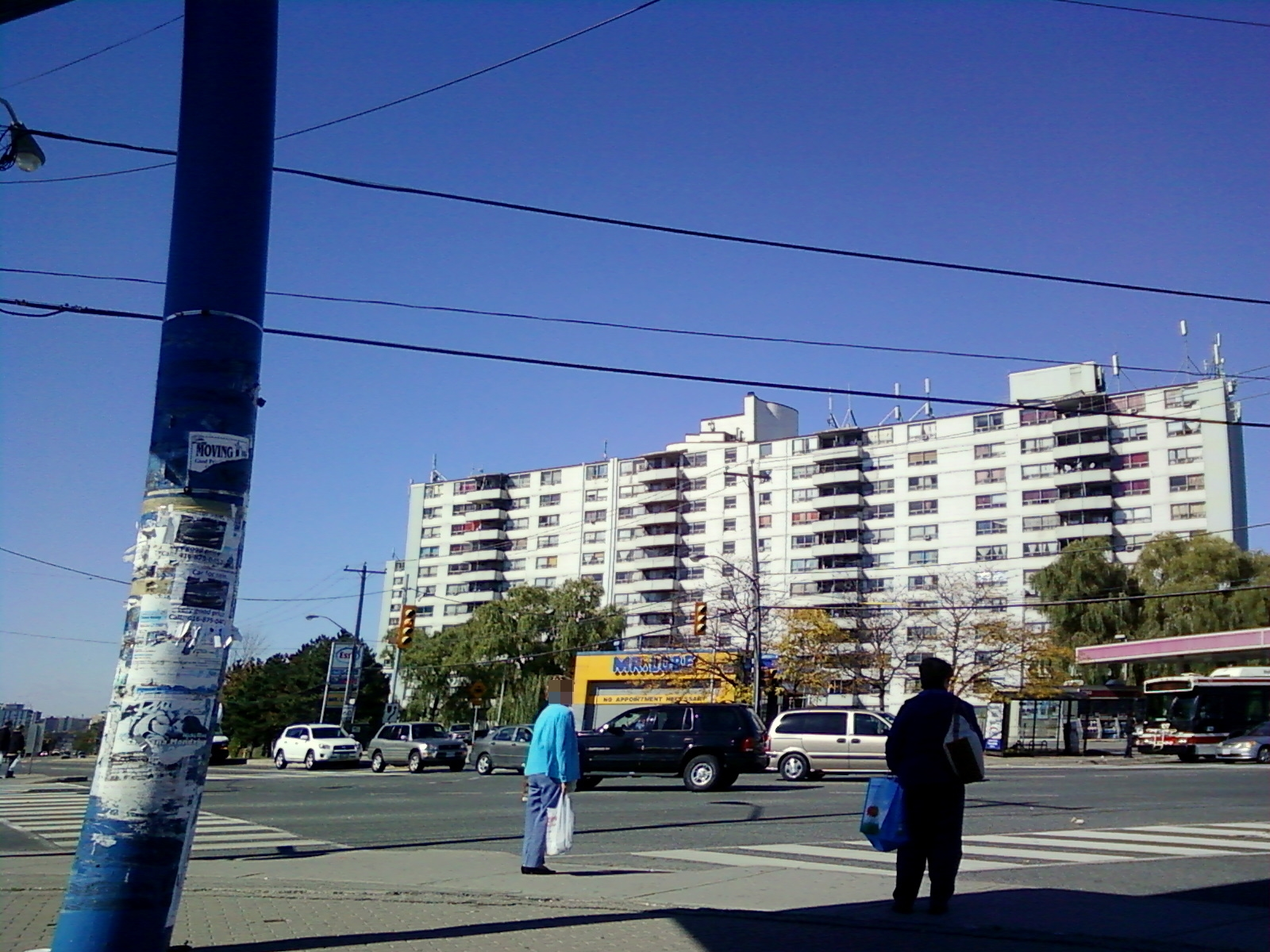
- View of Maple Leaf from Keele Street and Lawrence Avenue

- Location within Toronto
- Coordinates: 43.713°N 79.489°W
- Country: Canada
- Province: Ontario
- City: Toronto
- Municipality established: 1850 York Township
- Changed municipality: 1922 North York from York Township
- Changed municipality: 1998 Toronto from North York

Population (2021)
  - Total: 9,840
  - Density: 4,012/km^{2} (10,390/sq mi)

Maple Leaf is a neighbourhood in Toronto, Ontario, Canada. It is located southwest of the North York district. Its approximate borders are Lawrence Avenue to the south, Culford Road to the west, Highway 401 to the north, and the CNR rail lines east of Keele Street to the east.

== Education ==
Three public school boards operate schools in Maple Leaf: Conseil scolaire Viamonde (CSV), the Toronto Catholic District School Board (TCDSB), and the Toronto District School Board (TDSB). CSV and TDSB are secular school boards; the former is a French first-language school board, whereas the latter is an English first-language school board. TCDSB is an English first-language, separate school board.

All three school boards operate elementary and middle schools in the neighbourhood. Public institutions that provide primary education include:

- Amesbury Middle School (TDSB)
- Gracefield Public School (TDSB)
- Maple Leaf Public School (TDSB)
- École élémentaire Mathieu-da-Costa (CSV)
- St. Fidelis Catholic School (TCDSB)
- St. Francis Xavier Catholic School (TCDSB)

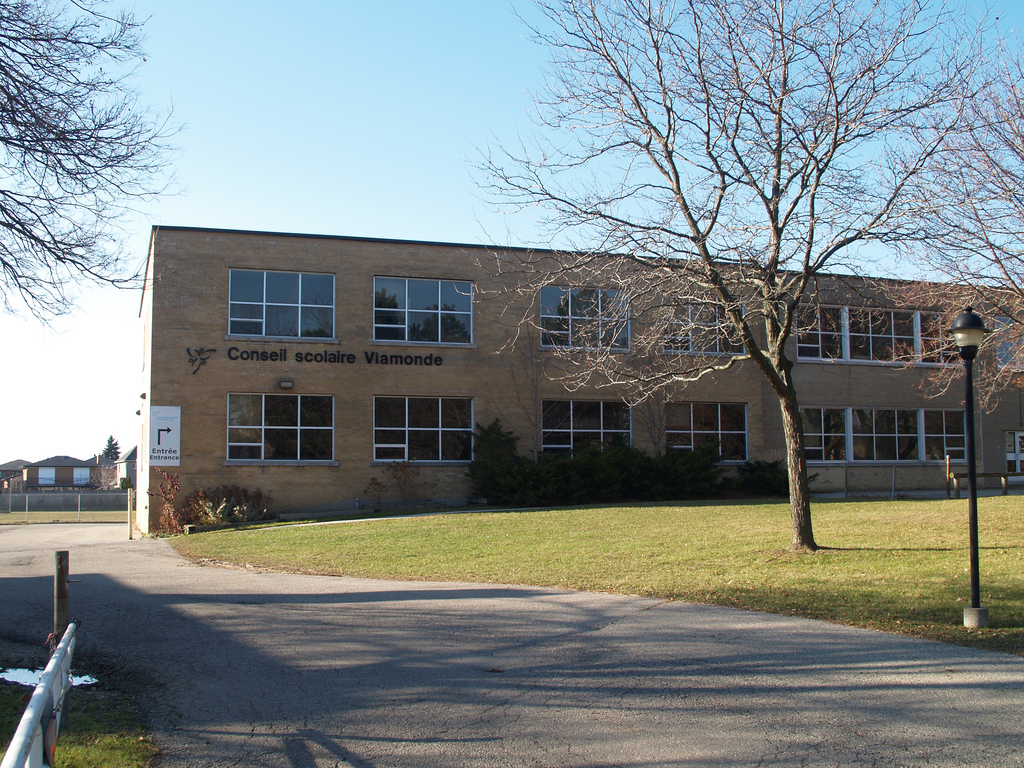
The headquarters for Conseil scolaire Viamonde, a French first-language public school board, is in Maple Leaf.

TCDSB is the only school board that operates a secondary school in the neighbourhood. TDSB previously operated Nelson A. Boylen Collegiate Institute, a public secondary school until 2016, whereas TCDSB operates Chaminade College School, a public all-boys secondary school.

While CSV's headquarters are located in the neighbourhood, in the same building as École élémentaire Mathieu-da-Costa, CSV does not operate a secondary school there. CSV secondary school students residing in Maple Leaf attend institutions in adjacent neighbourhoods.

The public French first language separate school board, Conseil scolaire catholique MonAvenir (CSCM), also offer schooling to applicable residents of Maple Leaf. However, they do not operate a school in the neighbourhood. CSCM students attend schools situated in other neighbourhoods in Toronto.

== Recreation ==
Several municipal parks managed by the Toronto Parks, Forestry and Recreation Division are in the neighbourhood. They include Maple Leaf Park, the Queen's Greenbelt, and North Park. The division also operates a community centre in Maple Leaf, the Falstaff Community Centre.

== Demographics ==
The population of Maple Leaf in 2021 was: 9,840

Major ethnic populations (2021):

- 55.0% White; 30.3% Italian, 9.4% Portuguese
- 14.2% Filipino
- 10.0% Latin American (of any race)
- 7.9% South Asian
- 7.1% Black; 2.2% Jamaican
- 4.9% East Indian

The population of Maple Leaf in 2016 was: 10,111

Major ethnic populations (2016):

- 55.0% White; 35.2% Italian, 9.6% Portuguese
- 12.1% Filipino
- 9.7% South Asian
- 8.4% East Indian
- 7.8% Black; 3.7% Jamaican
- 6.4% Latin American (of any race)

The population of Maple Leaf in 2011 was: 10,197

Major ethnic populations (2011):

- 56.0% White; 34.8% Italian (largest concentration in Toronto), 6.8% Portuguese
- 11.0% East Indian
- 12.9% South Asian
- 10.1% Filipino
- 7.1% Black
- 6.8% Latin American (of any race)

The population of Maple Leaf in 2006 was: 10,175

Major ethnic populations (2006):

- 63.7% White; 44.8% Italian, 3.7% Portuguese
- 14.1% South Asian
- 6.6% Latin American (of any race)
- 6.2% Black
- 2.6% Filipino

The population of Maple Leaf in 2001 was: 10,290

Major ethnic populations (2001):

- 68.9% White; 41.6% Italian, 4.2% Portuguese
- 9.6% South Asian
- 7.0% Latin American (of any race)
- 5.7% Black
- 3.8% Filipino

== Transportation ==
Several major roadways pass through the Maple Leaf, including Black Creek Drive, Keele Street, Lawrence Avenue, controlled access highways Highway 400, and Highway 401. Lawrence Avenue is a major roadway that serves as the neighbourhood's southern boundary. Culford Road serves as the neighbourhood's western boundary. Highway 401 is a major east–west highway that passes through Greater Toronto and serves as the neighbourhoods northern boundary.

Public transportation in the neighbourhood is provided by the Toronto Transit Commission's bus system.
