= Rustic, Toronto =

Rustic
- Neighbourhood
- Location within Toronto
- Coordinates: 43.713°N 79.504°W
- Country: Canada
- Province: Ontario
- City: Toronto
- Municipality established: 1850 York Township
- Changed municipality: 1922 North York from York Township
- Changed municipality: 1998 Toronto from North York

Population (2021)
  - Total: 9,390
  - Density: 4,734/km^{2} (12,260/sq mi)

Rustic is a neighbourhood in the city of Toronto, Ontario, Canada. It is located in the southwest of the North York district. Its approximate borders are Lawrence Avenue to the south, Jane Street to the west, Highway 401 to the north, and Culford Road to the east.

== Demographics ==
Total population (2021): 9,390

Major ethnic populations (2021):

- 36.1% White; (21.4% Italian, 6.4% Portuguese)
- 37.3% Black; 8.5% Somali, 7.1% Jamaican
- 7.6% Latin American (of any race)
- 5.2% South Asian
- 5.1% Filipino

Total population (2016): 9,941

Major ethnic populations (2016):

- 39.6% White; (22.6% Italian, 8.1% Portuguese)
- 34.8% Black; 10.4% Jamaican, 10.1% Somali
- 7.4% Latin American (of any race)
- 4.3% South Asian
- 4.1% Filipino

Total population (2011): 9,951

Major ethnic populations (2011):

- 38.0% White; (24.3% Italian, 8.0% Portuguese)
- 38.4% Black; 10.6% Jamaican, 9.3% Somali
- 6.7% Latin American (of any race)
- 4.9% South Asian

Total population (2006): 9,865

Major ethnic populations (2006):

- 44.7% White; (31.1% Italian, 3.8% Portuguese)
- 30.4% Black; 10.4% Jamaican, 6.9% Somali
- 8.1% South Asian
- 6.2% Latin American (of any race)

Total population (2001): 9,740

Major ethnic populations (2001):

- 49.8% White; (31.8% Italian, 3.3% Portuguese)
- 27.3% Black; 11.6% Jamaican
- 8.8% Latin American (of any race)
- 6.8% South Asian
