= List of Toronto Public Library branches =

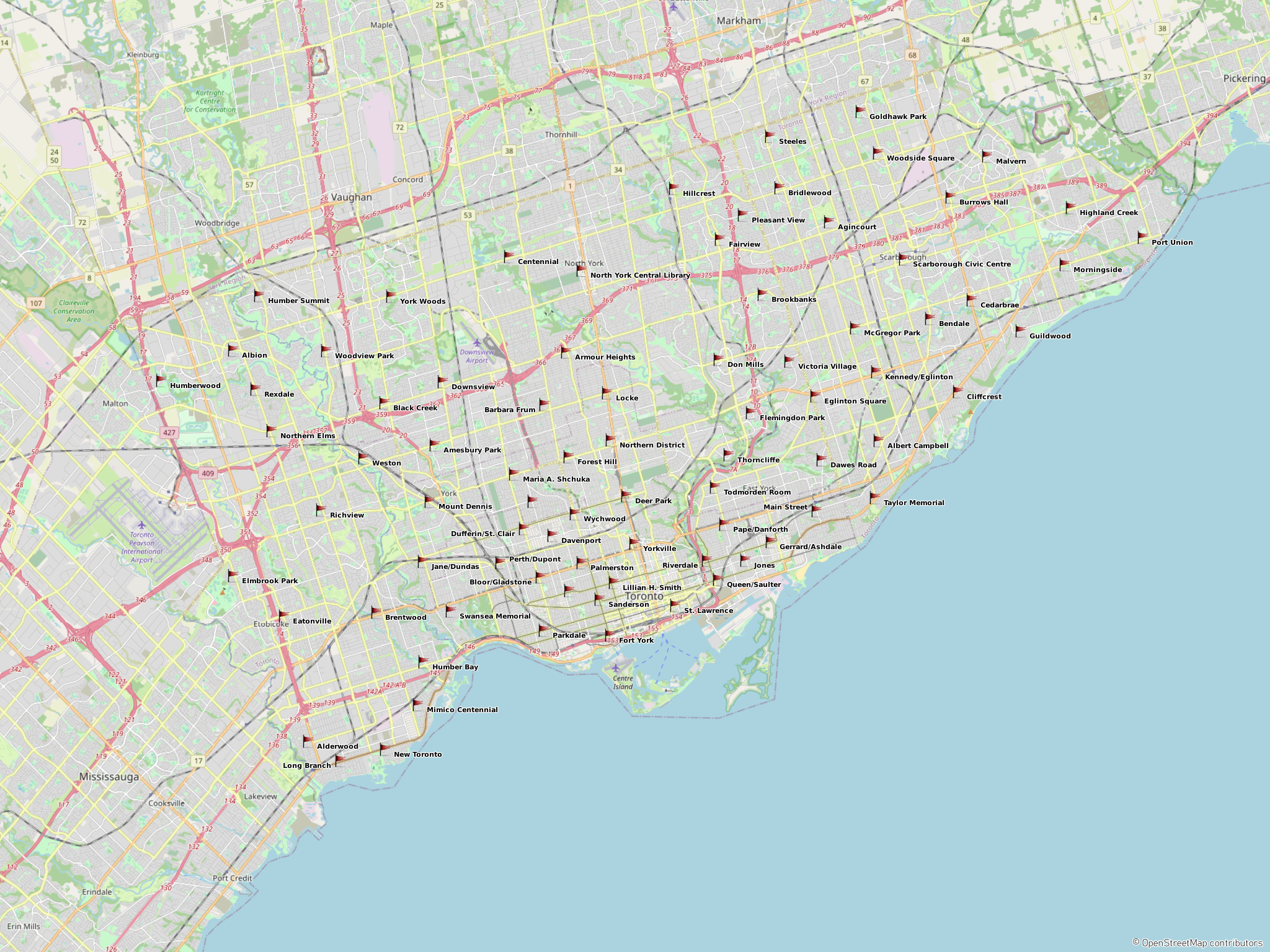
Map showing locations of all branches of the Library as of July 2019

The Toronto Public Library operates a total of 100 branch libraries across Toronto, Ontario, Canada.

== Current branches ==
Name	Neighbourhood	Opened	Built	Collection size	Notes	Image
Agincourt	Agincourt	1918	1991	176,367	Originally the Agincourt Association Library for the village of Agincourt and located at Agincourt Continuation School, joined Library Board of the Township of Scarborough in 1955 (later renamed Scarborough Public Library). Moved from Agincourt Mall location in 1991 to 155 Bonis Avenue as Agincourt District Branch.	
Albert Campbell	Scarborough Junction	1971	1971	120,658	Named after Albert Campbell; operated as Albert Campbell District Branch prior to 1998. The library renovated from 2019 to 2022.	
Albion	Smithfield	1965	1973	133,268		
Alderwood	Alderwood	1958	1999	49,830		
Amesbury Park	Amesbury	1967	1967	39,287		
Annette Street	The Junction	1888	1909	39,083	Carnegie library	
Armour Heights	Armour Heights	1982	1982	26,528		
Barbara Frum	Lawrence Manor	1992	1992	138,657	Replaced Bathurst Heights Regional Library. Named after Barbara Frum.	
Beaches	The Beaches	1914	1916	54,089	Carnegie library built in 1916	
Bendale	Bendale	1834	1961	38,957	Founded as the Scarboro' Subscription Library and then became the Scarborough Mechanics' Institute. In 1955 became one of the first three branches of the Scarborough Public Library.	
Black Creek	Downsview	1968	2002	32,052	Located in the North York Sheridan Mall	
Bloor/Gladstone	Dufferin Grove	1911	1911	59,825	Reopened after renovations in 2009	
Brentwood	The Kingsway	1955	1955	97,432	Etobicoke's main library from 1955 to 1966	
Bridlewood	L'Amoreaux	1976	1992	59,472	At Bridlewood Mall	
Brookbanks	Parkwoods	1968	1968	49,023		
Burrows Hall	Malvern	1998	1998	53,137		
Cedarbrae	Woburn	1966	1966	158,760	Operated as Cederbrae District Branch prior to 1998	
Centennial	Branson	1966	1966	36,360	Closed in 2024 for demolition and reconstruction. The new library is slated to open in 2027. A temporary branch has opened in the nearby Finchurst Plaza.	
City Hall	Downtown	1965	1965	36,683	Inside Toronto City Hall	
Cliffcrest	Cliffcrest	1972	2008	30,087		
College/Shaw	Little Italy	1984	1984	37,123		
Danforth/Coxwell	East Danforth	1989	1989	52,136		
Daniel G. Hill	Runnymede	1951	1975	46,429	Originally named Jane/Dundas; renamed in the 2020s following the controversy surrounding Henry Dundas's impact on abolition	
Davenport	Davenport	1988	1988	15,971		
Dawes Road	O'Connor-Parkview	1976	1976	48,472	Replaced Woodbine Gardens branch	
Deer Park	Deer Park	1905	1952	74,088		
Don Mills	Don Mills	1961	1961	128,059		
Downsview	Downsview	1962	1962	83,604		
Dufferin/St. Clair	Corso Italia	1921	1921	38,883		
Eatonville	Eatonville	1964	1964	73,786		
Eglinton Square	Golden Mile	1955	1965	44,306	In Eglinton Square Shopping Centre	
Elmbrook Park	Eringate	1988	1988	35,929		
Ethennonnhawahstihnen'	Bayview Village	2023	2023	43,145	Opened in 2023 and located inside the Ethennonnhawahstihnen’ Community Recreation Centre and Library behind the Bessarion station southern entrance, the library hosts collections and services from the former Bayview branch.	
Evelyn Gregory	Silverthorn	1968	1968	42,632	Named in honour of York Public Library Chief Librarian Evelyn Gregory	
Fairview	Don Valley Village	1972	1976	218,432	Adjacent to Fairview Mall	
Flemingdon Park	Flemingdon Park	1981	1981	48,177		
Forest Hill	Forest Hill	1955	1962	56,398		
Fort York	CityPlace	2014	2013	-		
Gerrard/Ashdale	Little India	1924	1924	52,172		
Goldhawk Park	Milliken	1992	1992	58,182		
Guildwood	Guildwood	1974	1974	30,034		
High Park	Roncesvalles	1916	1916	55,794	Carnegie library	
Highland Creek	Highland Creek	1889	1994	45,712	Founded as the Highland Creek Mechanics' Institute	
Hillcrest	Hillcrest Village	1975	1975	48,104		
Humber Bay	Humber Bay	1925	1951	29,517	Etobicoke Public Library headquarters 1951–1955	
Humberwood	Humberwood	1996	1996	39,652	Located in the Humberwood Community Centre	
Humber Summit	Humber Summit	1974	1974	24,225		
Jane/Sheppard	Downsview	1989	2009	31,668		
Jones	Leslieville	1962	1962	33,290		
Junction Triangle	Junction Triangle	2025	2025	23,003	Opened on 20 August 2025. At 10,000 square feet, it is more than triple the size of the former Perth/Dupont branch it replaced.	
Kennedy/Eglinton	Ionview	1988	1988	34,331	In Liberty Square Shopping Plaza	
Leaside	Leaside	1944	1950	60,607		
Lillian H. Smith	Grange Park	1922	1995	122,412	Originally the Boys & Girls House. Focus on children's literature. Named after Boys & Girls House founder Lillian H. Smith.	
Locke	Lawrence Park	1949	1949	70,804	Named after chief librarian George Locke.	
Long Branch	Long Branch	1944	1954	34,305		
Main Street	Upper Beaches	1903	1921	44,279		
Malvern	Malvern	1982	1982	149,256	Complete renovation and expansion in 2003	
Maria A. Shchuka	Fairbank	1951	1951	106,228	Named after Maria A. Shchuka, York Head Librarian from 1979 to 1996	
Maryvale	Maryvale	1982	1982	52,793	Inside Parkway Mall	
McGregor Park	Dorset Park	1960	2004	43,994		
Mimico Centennial	Mimico	1915	1966	48,591	Originally was a Carnegie library, but was demolished in 1966	
Morningside	West Hill, Toronto	1968	2006	47,530		
Mount Dennis	Mount Dennis	1923	1951	46,982	Library renovated and reopened in 2013	
Mount Pleasant	Davisville Village	1992	1992	19,654		
New Toronto	New Toronto	1921	1994	40,427		
North York Central Library	North York Centre	1959	1987	542,218		
Northern District	North Toronto	1909	1975	177,153	Previously located at 14 St. Clements Avenue from 1922 to 1975.	
Northern Elms	Rexdale	1991	2005	24,983		
Oakwood Village Library	Oakwood	1997	1997	37,647		
Palmerston	Seaton Village	1971	1971	39,802		
Pape/Danforth	The Danforth	1929	1929	64,490		
Parkdale	Parkdale, Toronto	1881	1964	74,065		
Parliament	Cabbagetown	1955	1969	60,663		
Pleasant View	Pleasant View	1975	1975	40,413		
Port Union	Port Union	1974	1984	41,474	Located inside Port Union Community Recreation Centre.	
Queen/Saulter	Riverside	1979	1980	19,523	In the Ralph Thornton Community Centre	
Rexdale	Rexdale	1959	1959	35,431		
Richview	Richview	1966	1966	198,928		
Riverdale	Riverdale	1888	1910	68,221	Carnegie library	
Runnymede	Bloor West Village	1904	1930	73,075	Designed by John M. Lyle	
S. Walter Stewart	Old East York	1950	1960	97,466	Named after S. Walter Stewart, first chair of the East York library board	
Sanderson	Alexandra Park	1968	1968	64,914	Named in honour of chief librarian Charles Sanderson	
Scarborough Civic Centre	Scarborough City Centre	2015	2015	40,000	Located within Scarborough Civic Centre	
Spadina Road	The Annex	1977	1977	42,573		
St. Clair/Silverthorn	The Junction	1981	1981	21,007	Was featured in the opening credits of the former TVO kids' show Bookmice	
St. James Town	St. James Town	2004	2004	59,802		
St. Lawrence	St. Lawrence	1982	1982	29,617	To be replaced by a new much larger 30,000 square foot facility at 339 Queen Street East by late 2028.	
Steeles	Steeles	1987	1987	48,086	At Bamburgh Gardens Plaza	
Swansea Memorial	Swansea	1923	1959	10,049		
Taylor Memorial	Birch Cliff	1962	1985	29,687	Named after Florence Nightingale Taylor, wife of John Taylor, who donated his home for the original library building	
Thorncliffe	Thorncliffe Park	1961	1970	41,752		
Todmorden Room	Pape Village	1961	1961	8,874		
Toronto Reference Library	Yorkville	1909	1977	1,653,665	Largest public reference library in Canada. The previous location at College and St. George became the Koffler Student Centre.	
Victoria Village	Victoria Village	1967	1967	30,504		
Weston	Weston	1858	1914	43,686	Carnegie library	
Woodside Square	Agincourt	1977	1977	66,076	At Woodside Square Mall. Relocated from former location (renovated 1989) at northwest exit to current location next to former Dominion's store in 2007.	
Woodview Park	Emery	1964	1964	23,130		
Wychwood	Bracondale Hill	1880	1916	51,433	Carnegie library, renovation and expansion project completed in 2022	
York Woods	Jane and Finch	1970	1970	120,199		
Yorkville	Yorkville	1884	1907	62,240	Carnegie library	

== Former branches ==
Name	Neighbourhood	Opened	Closed	Built	Collection size	Notes	Image
Bayview	Bayview Village	1966	2023	2002	~~43,145~~	Located inside Bayview Village Shopping Centre. Closed in 2023, and collection was transferred to and replaced by Ethennonnhawahstihnen' branch.	
Central Library	University of Toronto	1909	1977	1909		Ontario's largest Carnegie library, it served as the main branch until 1977 with the opening of the Toronto Reference Library and now houses the University of Toronto Bookstore.	
Downtown Branch	Downtown	1928	1965			First located at Old City Hall 1911, 42 Adelaide Street West in 1928, 39 King Street West in 1952 (now Bank of Nova Scotia Building) and 25 Richmond Street West (now Cloud Garden) in 1956. Closed in 1965 and replaced by City Hall branch.	
Mechanics' Institute	Downtown	1883	1927	1853		Served as the first home of the Toronto Public Library, and as the main branch until 1909, but was closed in 1927	
Perth/Dupont	West Junction Triangle	1977	2025	1983	23,003	Replaced by Junction Triangle branch	
Urban Affairs	Downtown Toronto	1911	2011	1992	~~346,650~~	Previously located at Metro Hall, the branch was closed September 14, 2011, and the collection moved to the Toronto Reference Library.	
Yorkdale Branch	Yorkdale–Glen Park	1969	1993			Former branch located inside Yorkdale Shopping Centre.	
