= Knox Presbyterian Church (Agincourt) =

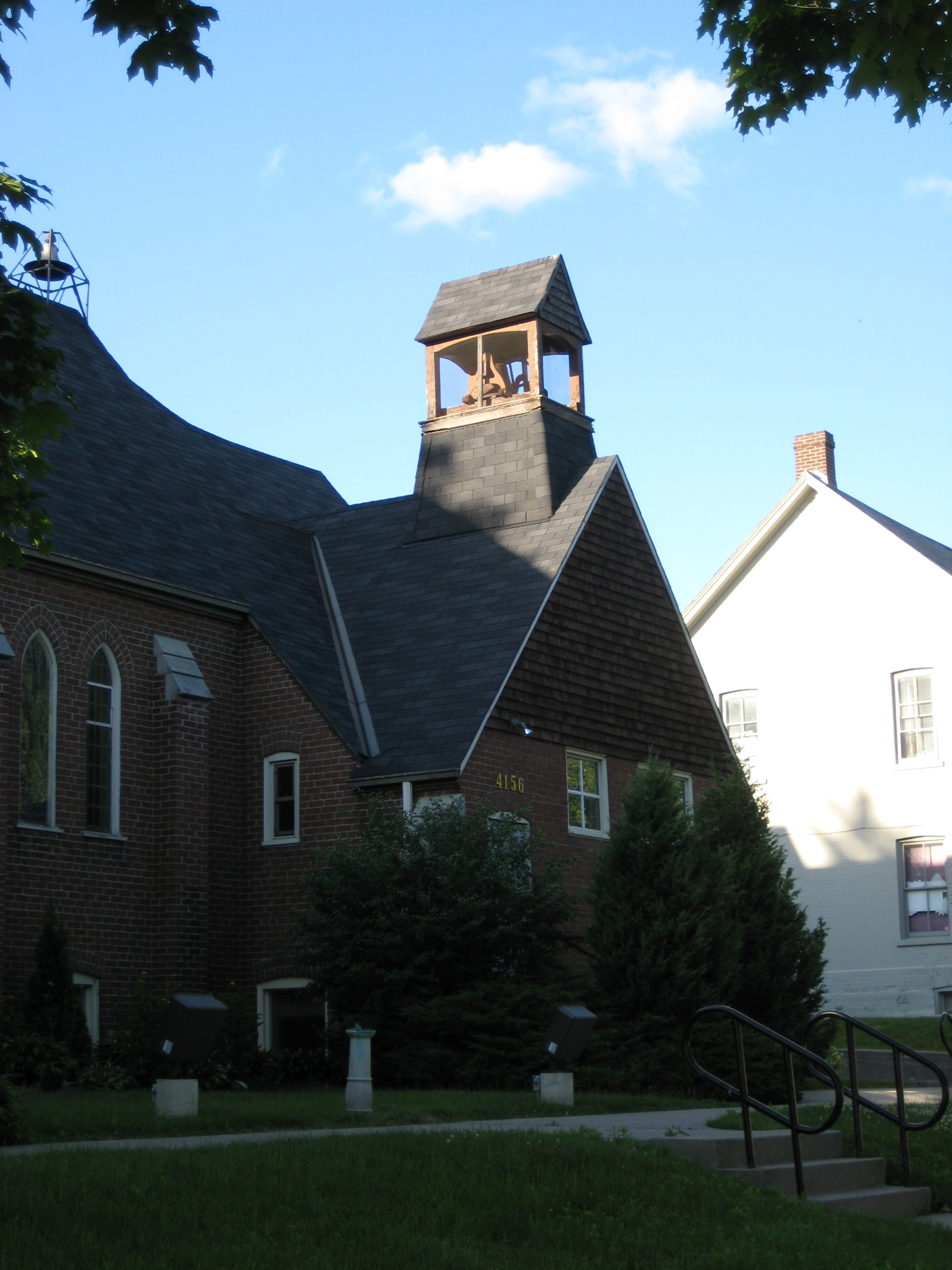

- Location of Knox Presbyterian Church in Toronto
- 43°47′07″N 79°16′53″W
- Location: Toronto, Ontario
- Country: Canada
- Denomination: Presbyterian Church in Canada

History
- Founded: 1925

Administration
- Province: Ontario

Knox Presbyterian Church is located at 4156 Sheppard Avenue East in the Agincourt neighbourhood of Toronto, Ontario, Canada.

It was formed by former members of the "Historic" Knox Presbyterian Church (now Knox United Church) after that Presbyterian congregation voted 136-106 in 1925 to join the United Church of Canada. The new congregation was initially assisted by the Minister and Elders of St. Andrew's Presbyterian Church Scarborough, but has also grown over the years; their 1950s extension is named the "John Forbes Hall" after the Minister of that era (1950–1969).

Recent ministers of this church include: Rev. Dr. Robert P Carter (1974–1987, died August 2007), Rev Gordon Hastings (1988–1996), Reverends Dr H. Glen (Moderator of the 2000 General Assembly) and Joyce Davis (1996–2003), Dr. Jeff Loach (2004–2006), now the regional director of the Canadian Bible Society. Interim Moderator Rev. Dr. Ian Clark served in 2004, and returned for 2006-07, and led the Induction Service on July 29, 2007 for Rev. Harry J. Bradley.

There is great co-operation between the two Knox Churches, as well as other congregations in the Agincourt area with joint ministerials, and social ministries and spiritual programmes such as Alpha.

== See also ==
- List of oldest buildings and structures in Toronto
- List of Presbyterian churches in Toronto
