= Charles Sanderson =

Charles Sanderson may refer to:

- Charles R. Sanderson (1887–1956), Canadian librarian
- Charles Sanderson (footballer) (1903–1976), English footballer
- Charles Sanderson, Baron Sanderson of Bowden (1933–2026), Scottish politician
