= List of Presbyterian churches in Toronto =

This is a list of Presbyterian Church in Canada churches in Toronto, Ontario, Canada.

== Introduction ==
In 1925, about 70% of Presbyterian churches across Canada joined the new United Church of Canada, although the split in Toronto was closer to 50-50. This is a list of churches within the present boundaries of Toronto that have been part of The Presbyterian Church in Canada since June 1925.

=== Presbyterial oversight ===
The Presbytery of Toronto has been an Ecclesiastical District (in Presbyterian Polity, known as a Presbytery), since the formation of the City in 1834, by all the groups that led to the formation of the PCC in 1875. The bounds in 1875 spread north and west to include Oakville, Milton, Georgetown, Brampton, King Township, Newmarket and Sutton West. In 1883, Melville, West Hill was dismissed to the neighbouring Presbytery of Whitby, as it was linked from 1883 to 1900 with Dunbarton (now United) Church in Pickering Township. In 1925, Melville, Whitby, Ashburn, and Oshawa were added to the Toronto Presbytery.

On January 1, 1949, Toronto Presbytery was divided into East Toronto and West Toronto, with Bathurst Street the dividing line, putting flagship congregations of Knox, Toronto and St. Andrew's, Toronto along with Knox College into East Toronto. In 1963, St. Andrew's in Hamilton Bermuda was added to West Toronto, and the congregations west of Toronto and York County boundaries were dismissed to Brampton Presbytery a couple of years later. In January 1990, The Presbytery of Pickering was formed from East Toronto congregations east of Victoria Park Avenue in the then City of Scarborough, and adding 4 Durham Region congregation (all part of the pre-1925 Whitby Presbytery). In 1993, Oak Ridges Presbytery was erected, and the East and West Toronto Presbyteries were confined to Toronto (and Bermuda) alone. In 1998, the Han-Ca East Presbytery was erected, consisting of Korean congregations from Ontario to Halifax.

== The List ==
Congregation (Active are in bold)	Location	Dates	Notes	Image
Albion Gardens	Thistletown	1957-2012	Building constructed in 1961. In July 2011, merged with Pine Ridge PC, and became **Fellowship Presbyterian** in April 2012.	
**Armour Heights**	Armour Heights	1950	Extension congregation, merged in 1998 with former Melrose Park congregation.	
**Beaches**	The Beaches	1925	Minority Group from Kew Beach (now Beach United).	
Bonar	St Clarens Ave., (w. side) n. of College near Lansdowne	1889–1969	Named after Scottish brothers Andrew and Horatius Bonar. Buildings constructed in 1907 and 1922; demolished c1970. Merged with Parkdale Presbyterian Church to form **Bonar-Parkdale**	
**Bonar-Parkdale**	Parkdale	1969	Formed in 1969 as a merger of Parkdale Presbyterian Church and Bonar Presbyterian Church. **Bonar Parkdale Place** constructed in the 1990s.	
**Bridlewood**	L'Amoreaux	1967	Daughter congregation of Knox Toronto; self-supporting in under one year. Building constructed in 1973; 1984 addition contained many furninshings from former Cooke's Church.	
**Calvin**	Deer Park	1925	Minority Group, mainly from Deer Park, and also from Avenue Road. Now, Deer Park uses this building and regularly shares services.	
**Celebration**	Glen Park	2003	Merger of **Coldstream** (1950) and **Fairbank** (1890; 1925 Minority from Fairbank Presbyterian / St. Cuthbert's United) on Coldstream site.	
Chalmers	Dundas and Dovecourt	1877-1978.	Originally named **Brockton** Presbyterian. Building constructed 1889. Fire in 1945 destroyed Sanctuary, Sunday School hall renovated as replacement. Merged with St. Paul's Dovercourt, Demolished in the early 1980s.	
**Chinese**	Grange Park	Congregation started in 1912; group went to United Church in 1925	Building constructed in 1960, replacing former building expropriated for Toronto City Hall.	
Chinese Agincourt Mission	Agincourt	1979-1991	This group met at Knox Presbyterian Agincourt following the arrival of many Chinese families in the area. Prior to the erection of the Presbytery of Pickering in 1990, this group became a formal congregation. In 1991, **Markham Chinese Presbyterian Church** was dedicated on Dennison Street in the Milliken community, and in 1992 joined Oak Ridges Presbytery.	
**Clairlea Park**	Clairlea	1952	York Townline Cemetery and former Chalmers Canada Presbyterian Church 1863-1890 at NE corner of Pharmacy and St. Clair; land swap for cemetery (all but one re-interred at Pine Hills Cemetery). Gas Station (now demolished) on old site; Church is one block east	
Coldstream	Glen Park	1949-2003	Congregation started in 1949, building on Bathurst Street in 1951. Joined with Fairbank in 2004, becoming Celebration.	
Cooke's	Queen and Mutual	1851–1982	Previously known as Second Presbyterian, and named after Irish Presbyterian leader. Demolished 1984	
Cowan Avenue	Parkdale	1886-1928		
Dale		1884–1939	Mission of St. Andrew's Church started in the 1870s. Known as **St. Mark's** until move in 1909. Previously located at Adelaide West of Tecumseh, and in 1886 to King and Tecumseh. Congregation closed in 1939. Building is now **St. Nicholas Ukrainian Catholic Church**.	
Davenport	Davenport	1904–1972	Buildings constructed in 1905, 1909, and renovation in 1921. Merged with Wychwood Presbyterian to form **Wychwood-Davenport** on the Wychwood site. Building continues as **Galilee Korean Presbyterian Church** (Han-Ca East Presbytery, Presbyterian Church in Canada)	
Deer Park	Deer Park	1887–1925	Began as a mission near Yonge Street and St. Clair Avenue West. New building in 1911 near St. Clair West and Avenue Road. Congregation voted in 1925 to join the United Church. Dissidents started nearby Calvin Church. Remnant of Deer Park United congregation moved to Calvin in 2008. Building desanctified and sold to a developer.	
Dovercourt Road	Dufferin Grove	1886–1968	Originally met as Mission of Chalmers Church, located north of Bloor and Dovercourt. Present building constructed at Hepbourne and Dovercourt in 1905. Merged with St. Paul's Presbyterian in 1968 to form **Dovercourt-St. Paul's**, then with Dufferin Street in 1993 to become **St. Paul's** . Presently used by **Portuguese-Speaking Presbyterian Church**.	
Dovercourt-St. Paul's	Dufferin Grove	1968–1993	Created from merger of Dovercourt Presbyterian and St. Paul's in 1968. In 1993 merged with Dufferin Street Presbyterian to become **St. Paul's** Presbyterian, and closed in 2005.	
Dufferin Street	Wallace-Emerson	1907–1993	Merged with Dovercourt-St. Paul's Presbyterian Church to form **St. Paul's** Presbyterian in 1993. Building sold to a Baptist ministry, and was sold to become lofts in 2012.	
East Toronto Korean	Little Korea	1975-2005	started after Toronto Korean's move into the former Davenport building, this group started in Scarborough's Wexford building, moved to Roger's Memorial in 1977, then acquired former Epworth United on Christie Street in an area where Korean-Canadian businesses opened many shops and restaurants. In 2005, the congregation moved into new facilities in Vaughan, and renamed themselves Vaughan Community Presbyterian Church.	
Emmanuel	Upper Beaches	1885–1988	Started as **East Toronto Junction Presbyterian Mission** in 1885. First building located on Main Street. Became Emmanuel with merger of Chalmers, York Townline congregation in Scarborough Township, and maintenance of Cemetery in 1893. Led by Rev. Dr. Thomas Rogers for 30 years, and who was active in Presbyterian Church Association (1925 anti-Union vote), as well as seeing other congregations begin in district; including Rogers Memorial. In 1987, merged with two "daughter" congregations to form **Faith Community Presbyterian** in the former St. James building.	
Fairbank	Fairbank	1925-2003	A "Minority Group" from Fairbank (later St. Cuthburt's United) Presbyterian. Joined by Mount Dennis in 1939. Merged into Coldstream in 2003, becoming Celebration. Building now used by African congregation.	
**Faith Community Presbyterian**	Old East York	1988	Created as a merger of three congregations, St. James, Emmanuel, and St. Matthew's in the former St. James building.	
**Fallingbrook**	Birch Cliff	1948		
**Fellowship**	Thistletown	2012	Consummation of the 2011 merger of Albion Gardens and Pine Ridge congregations, meeting in the Albion Gardens building.	
**First Hungarian**	Humewood-Cedarvale	1930	1967 move from 206 McCaul Street (1938 Building), and merged with Oshawa Hungarian Mission in 1970; services are still held monthly in Oshawa. 1948 building built as home of Willowdale's Wellspring Worship Centre (formerly Banfield Memorial Evangelical Missionary Church).	
Forest Hill		pre-1925-1935		
Gateway Community	Flemingdon Park	1970-2010	In same building as Blessed John XXIII Roman Catholic; Congregation dissolved 2010; now a Mission.	
**Ghanaian**		1995	Joint Congregation of Presbyterian Church of Ghana and Presbyterian Church in Canada. Congregation constructed building at Highway 400 and Finch in 2003 but moved to Finch and Signet Drive 2006. Services in English, Ga, and Twi.	
**Glebe**	Davisville	1912	mission of Bloor Street Presbyterian. Remained in Presbyterian Church after voting twice in 1925—Ballot Box went on fire when first count taken. Closed in Jan 2013 and merged with Leaside.	
**Glenview**	North Toronto	1925	formed as Minority Group from Eglinton Presbyterian (St. George's United Church, now Eglinton-St. George's United) and Bedford Park.	
Grace, Etobicoke	Centennial	1955–2002	Originally called Bloorview, renamed Grace following acquisition of land in different neighbourhood. Building constructed in 1961, expanded in 1985. Merged with Hillview Presbyterian to form Graceview in the Grace Building in 2002.	
**Grace, West Hill**	West Hill	1956	merger of Centennial Road and West Rouge Sunday Schools. Built in Pickering Township, before West Rouge joined Scarborough in 1973.	
**Graceview**	Centennial	2002	merger of Grace Presbyterian Church (Etobicoke, Ontario) and Hillview Presbyterian Church in former Grace Building.	
**Guildwood Community**	Guildwood	1960		
High Park		1925–1968	Minority group of Alhambra and High Park. Site was a former School. Merged with Morningside to form **Morningside High Park**. Building is now **Jami Mosque**.	
Hillview	Centennial	1955–2002	In 2002 merged with Grace Presbyterian to form Graceview. Building is now home of **St. Timothy's Korean Presbyterian Church** (Han-Ca East Presbytery, Presbyterian Church in Canada)	
**Iona**	Don Valley Village	1966	In same building as St. Cyprian Anglican Church; was originally part of the "Tri-Congregations" with St. Cyprian and the former Hillcrest United Church.	
Kingsway	Kingsway	1945-1961	congregation started as post WWII work in June 1945. Congregation established in 1946, and acquired Montgomery's Inn, expanding facilities in 1952. Following resignation of founding minister to health concerns a decade later, supply ministers conducted Sunday services, until merger with nearby St. Giles Humber Valley in January 1961. Montgomery's Inn is now a Toronto City Museum	
**Knox, Toronto** (Spadina Ave.)	Harbord Village	1843 (from 1820)	Moved in 1905 from Yonge and Queen (Still owned by Knox Church, Currently leased to Hudson Bay Company), Sanctuary completed 1909. First congregation started as First Presbyterian Congregation of York, which was the first Presbyterian Church established in York, the old name of Toronto. Named after John Knox.	
**Knox, Agincourt**	Agincourt	1925	Minority group of Knox Presbyterian Church, Agincourt (now Knox United)	
**Leaside**	Leaside	1942	Formed originally as extension of Glebe Congregation. First Minister Rev. Dr. J. Charles Hay, later Principal of Knox College. When Glebe closed in 2013, Leaside merged with Glebe, keeping Leaside name and site.	
Logan Geggie Memorial		1950-1984	Sunday School started in 1947 from Parkdale, congregation named after a former esteemed Minister of Parkdale who died in that pulpit in 1922. Congregation became two-point charge with Park Lawn in 1989 until they merged into Mimico in 1995. Building sold to Buddhist group.	
**Malvern**	Malvern	1975.	Originallya shared building with Anglican Church, who left in the early 2000s.	
Melrose Park	North Toronto	1930s	A dissenting group from Glenview Church formed itself into this congregation which met at 250 Fairlawn Avenue until its amalgamation into Armour Heights Church in the late 1990s. The building was demolished, and replaced with housing.	
**Melville**	West Hill	1852	Started as Knox College Student Mission, joined with Knox Agincourt until 1883, Dunbarton (Pickering) until 1900, when it became a single-point charge.	
**Mimico**	Mimico	1925	Reacquired their 1890 building from United Church, who went into Wesley Methodist building. New Sanctuary built in 1950s beside old building, since renovated into hall.	
Morningside	Swansea	1889–1968	Merged with High Park to form **Morningside High Park**. Named after Morningside Church in Edinburgh.	
**Morningside High Park**	Swansea	1968	Created from a merger of Morningside Presbyterian and High Park Presbyterian; High Park's organ was brought over at merger.	
Mount Dennis	Mount Dennis	1925-1945	Minority group from Mount Dennis (once Chalmers' United before merging into Mount Dennis United) that eventually merged into Fairbank. Building on Weston Road north of Eglinton demolished.	
North Park	Maple Leaf	1950s	congregation now a Spanish-speaking mission, and building is for sale.	
Oakwood Presbyterian Church	Oakwood-Vaughan	1911–1977	Dissolved 1977, Building bought by Mount Zion Apolstolic Church, who moved to Malton in 1999, building razed 2009.	
Olivet	Yorkville	1925–1969	Minority group from Westminster, Bloor Street, Old St. Andrew's and St James Square acquired former Olivet Congregational Church.Named Central Presbyterian until 1935 and then Avenue Road Presbyterian until 1947. Closed 1977. Building is now commercial.	
Park Lawn		1952-1994	Congregation formally erected in 1953, and building constructed in 1956. came two-point charge with Logan Geggie in the late 1980s, and amalgamed into Mimico in 1994. Building was demolished afterwards.	
Parkdale	Parkdale	1879–1969	Merged with Bonar Presbyterian in 1969 to form **Bonar-Parkdale**. Had merged with Cowan Avenue PC in 1928 (that had grown out of Parkdale in 1886)	
Patterson	Earlscourt	1925–2011	Minority group of St. David's United, initially called St. David's Continuing Presbyterian Church. Name changed in 1927 to avoid coal deliveries going to wrong building, named after longtime minister of Cookes Church, Toronto. Congregation dissolved in November 2011.	
Pine Ridge	Humber Summit	1953-2012	Originally, an extension of Woodbridge Presbyterian Church. Was joined with Rexdale for 20 years. On June 19, 2011, congregation held final service, prior to merging with Albion Gardens.	
**Portuguese Speaking**	Dufferin Grove	1985	Housed in former St. Paul's Presbyterian, that they acquired in 2005.	
**Queen Street East**	Leslieville	1877	Originally called **Leslieville** Presbyterian Church, name changed upon Leslieville joining Toronto in 1893. Survived major fire in the late 1960s.	
**Rexdale**	Rexdale	1953	The congregation first met at Elmlea Public School, until a portable church building was acquired in 1955. A permanent church building was built in 1960 and it has since been replaced with a Seniors Housing complex, opened in 1979;	
**Riverdale**	Riverdale	1908	original building now being used, as 1912 Sanctuary is now lofts.	
Rogers Memorial	East Danforth	1922–2000	Closed in 2000, today building is home to **Toronto Chinese Mennonite Church**	
**Rosedale Presbyterian Church**	Rosedale	1907	First unit (small sanctuary) built in 1908, second unit in the 1950s with church Hall. Land for originally-planned larger sanctuary was expropriated when Mount Pleasant Road was opened up in the 1950s.	
Royce		1904–1969	Alhambra withdrew in the 1910s; Royce Avenue rebuilt and remained in PCC in 1925. Merged with Victoria Presbyterian to form Victoria-Royce Presbyterian building demolished in 1970 at Dupont (formerly Royce Avenue) and Perth.	
**Runnymede**	Runnymede	1906	original building moved from St John's Road to site in 1912; present building 1950 (original on parking lot)	
**St. Andrew's** (King Street)	Downtown	1830	Met on Church Street until present building opened 1876; major redevelopment in the 1990s, and 48th Highlanders Museum in building.	
**St. Andrew's Humber Heights**	Humber Heights-Westmount	1949		
**St. Andrew's Islington**	Islington-Six Points	1922	building rebuilt 1951; sanctuary reversed and Hall built 1968.	
**St. Andrew's, Scarborough**	Bendale	1818	Present building constructed 1849; dedicated 1850. Hall constructed 1957. Oldest Presbyterian Congregation in Toronto, started by Thomson family; active cemetery contains most of Scarborough pioneer European families. Was originally called Presbyterian Church of Scarboro in connection with the (Established) Church of Canada. Renamed St. Andrew's after 1875. Accessibility Ramp dedicated by Lieutenant Governor David Onley at 190th Anniversary in June 2008.	
**St. David's**	Eglinton East	1952	Started as Kitchener Park Extension mission, renamed St. David's in 1955. St. David's Place opened in 1978.	
St. Giles	The Kingsway	1951		
**St. Giles Kingsway**	The Kingsway	1961.	1961 Merger of **St. Giles** and **Kingsway** (1940s), the latter using Montgomery's Inn. Original St. Giles sanctuary recently renovated for a contemporary worship service called "The Well".	
St. James		1925–1988	Originally named **MacPherson (Continuing)** to 1939 (MacPherson United changed name to Dentonia Park). Merged with two other congregations (Emmanuel and St. Matthew's) to form **Faith Community Presbyterian** in St. James building.	
St. James, Long Branch	Long Branch	1914–2001	Originally called **Dunn Memorial**; renamed in the 1950s when Sanctuary built. Now home of a Korean Presbyterian (not PCC) congregation.	
**St. John's**	Riverside South	1888	Sanctuary dedicated in 1907 (moved from Gerrard East and Bolton). Basement home to **National Presbyterian Museum** since 2002.	
**St. John's Milliken**	Milliken	1980	Name "recycled" from former St. John's Milliken in Markham Township (1864–1929). Shares building with Anglican congregation.	
**St. Mark's**	Don Mills	1952	Shares building with **Myung Sung Korean Presbyterian Church** (Han Ca East Presbytery, PCC). Hall, including original building was replaced by Apartment complex in the 1990s.	
St. Matthew's		1925–1988	Minority group from Rhodes Avenue. Building constructed in 1948. Merged with two other (Emmanuel, St James) congregations to form Faith Presbyterian. Building now used by **Toronto Formosan Presbyterian Church**, a PCC Congregation of Taiwanese-Canadians.	
St. Paul's Presbyterian Church (old)	Seaton Village	1887–1968	In 1914, Erskine PC (1838 as First United Presbyterian, then Bay Street Canada Presbyterian Church) joined congregation. Merged with Dovercourt Presbyterian to form **Dovercourt-St Paul's** Presbyterian, building demolished, apartments on site.	
St. Paul's Presbyterian Church (new)	Dufferin Grove	1993–2005	Created from merger of Dovercourt-St Paul's Presbyterian with Dufferin Presbyterian. Building now home to Portuguese-speaking Presbyterian congregation.	
**St. Stephen's, Scarborough**	Woburn	1958	Started as **Golf Club Road** Presbyterian Church, later named St. Stephen's. Building constructed and dedicated in 1962.	
**St. Stephen's, Weston**	Emery	1960	Congregation started in local school. Building constructed in 1965.	
**St. Timothy's**				
**Toronto Formosan**	Little India	1980	Congregation started with Taiwanese Presbyterians, many whose ancestors became Christians through PCC Missionaries led by George Leslie Mackay. Moved into former St. Matthew's (see above) in 1989. 2 Taiwanese groups (Central and Toronto Formosan) merged in 2009.	
**Toronto Korean**		1969	Originally met in Knox, Spadina. Services later held at former Olivet in Yorkville, before former Davenport Presbyterian Church acquired. 1997 saw move to new facilities in Don Mills, in close proximity to major expressways.	
**Trinity Mandarin**	Don Valley Village	1992;	Originally met in Leslieville, and for many years at Willowdale Presbyterian. In same building as Iona Presbyterian and St. Cyprian Anglican Church	
**Trinity York Mills**	York Mills	1953	York Mills designation provides continuity with York Mills PC (1835–1886). Large Sanctuary built in the early 1990s.	
Ukrainian		1929-1976	Mission started after arrival of Rev. Michael Fesenko from Princeton Seminary. Conducted meetings on streets and in Dale Church. Following Dale's closure, small building on nearby Claremont Street built in 1941. In 1976, following Fesenko's Retirement (he died in 2003 at age 103) the congregation dissolved, proceeds went to fund his translation efforts on materials warmly welcomed in Ukraine following the end of USSR. Building now home of Chinese Baptist Congregation.	
**University**	Jane and Finch	1964	Originally met at Gosford Blvd Public School, with building constructed in 1965. Congregation reportedly initially called "University Acres" for the neighbouring subdivision.	
Victoria	The Junction	1884-1969.	originally named **West Toronto Junction**; renamed Victoria to commemorate Queen's Jubilee. Merged with Royce Presbyterian to form Victoria-Royce Presbyterian.	
Victoria-Royce	The Junction	1969–2004	Created as a merger of Victoria Presbyterian and Royce Presbyterian. Closed 2004, building today a condominium	
**Weston**	Weston	1847	originally served by Scottish-trained Principals of Weston Collegiate. Building 1880; was known as **the Old Church Weston** when Westminster constructed in 1912; Minority fought to keep building open, then stayed in PCC in 1925, while Westminster joined United Church, and resumed under original name.	
**Westminster, East York**	Old East York	1921	This congregation had its start as a mission from Riverdale Presbyterian in the spring of 1921. The earliest location was the back room of the Bank of Nova Scotia building at Pape and Gowan. The original frame church on what would become Floyd Ave, just west of Pape, opened in November, 1921. A larger stone church was completed immediately to the west of the original building in 1937. The congregation was known as **Todmorden** Presbyterian Church from its beginning until 1936. In 1993, Westminster Court, a 6-storey non-profit seniors' housing building was opened on the east side of the church property.	
**Westminster, Scarborough**	Golden Mile	1955	originally (1910) a Sunday School sponsored by Isabella Walton (of St. Andrew's Scarborough). First building constructed in 1926, congregation formed in the 1950s, and second building constructed in 1959. Site re-developed in 1991 including apartments, Isabella Walton Daycare Centre and new Sanctuary. Stained glass window in Sanctuary of old Sunday School house detailed to show outhouse, used until 1959 building constructed with indoor plumbing.	
**Westview**	O'Connor-Parkview	1950	Building constructed in two phases.	
**Wexford**	Wexford	1954	Buildings constructed in 1957 and 1963.	
Wychwood	Humewood-Cedarvale	1925-1972.	Minority Group of former St. Columba's United (building now a Roman Catholic congregation at St. Clair and Vaughan). Merged with Davenport Presbyterian to form Wychwood-Davenport	
**Wychwood-Davenport**	Humewood-Cedarvale	1972	Created as a merger of Wychwood Presbyterian and Davenport Presbyterian	
**Willowdale**	Willowdale	1925	formed as Westminster Presbyterian, as a Mision of Knox Toronto, prior to Church Union. Full-fledged congregation from June 1925, part of charge 1925-35 with Thornhill and Richmond Hill. Renamed Willowdale in 1952 when building on Ellerslie Avenue constructed.	
**York Memorial**	Silverthorn	1934	York congregation started almost a decade after nearby Silverthorn Mission went into United Church. Basement structure completed in 1937. In 1947, following World War II, renamed York Memorial as a war memorial. In 1959, neighbouring hall opened, and named following death of long-time founding minister David P. Rowland.	

== See also ==
- List of Anglican churches in Toronto
- List of Orthodox churches in Toronto
- List of United Church of Canada churches in Toronto
- List of Roman Catholic churches in Toronto
- List of Synagogues in Toronto
- List of cemeteries in Toronto
