= Yorkville Library (Toronto) =

Library branch in Toronto, Ontario, Canada

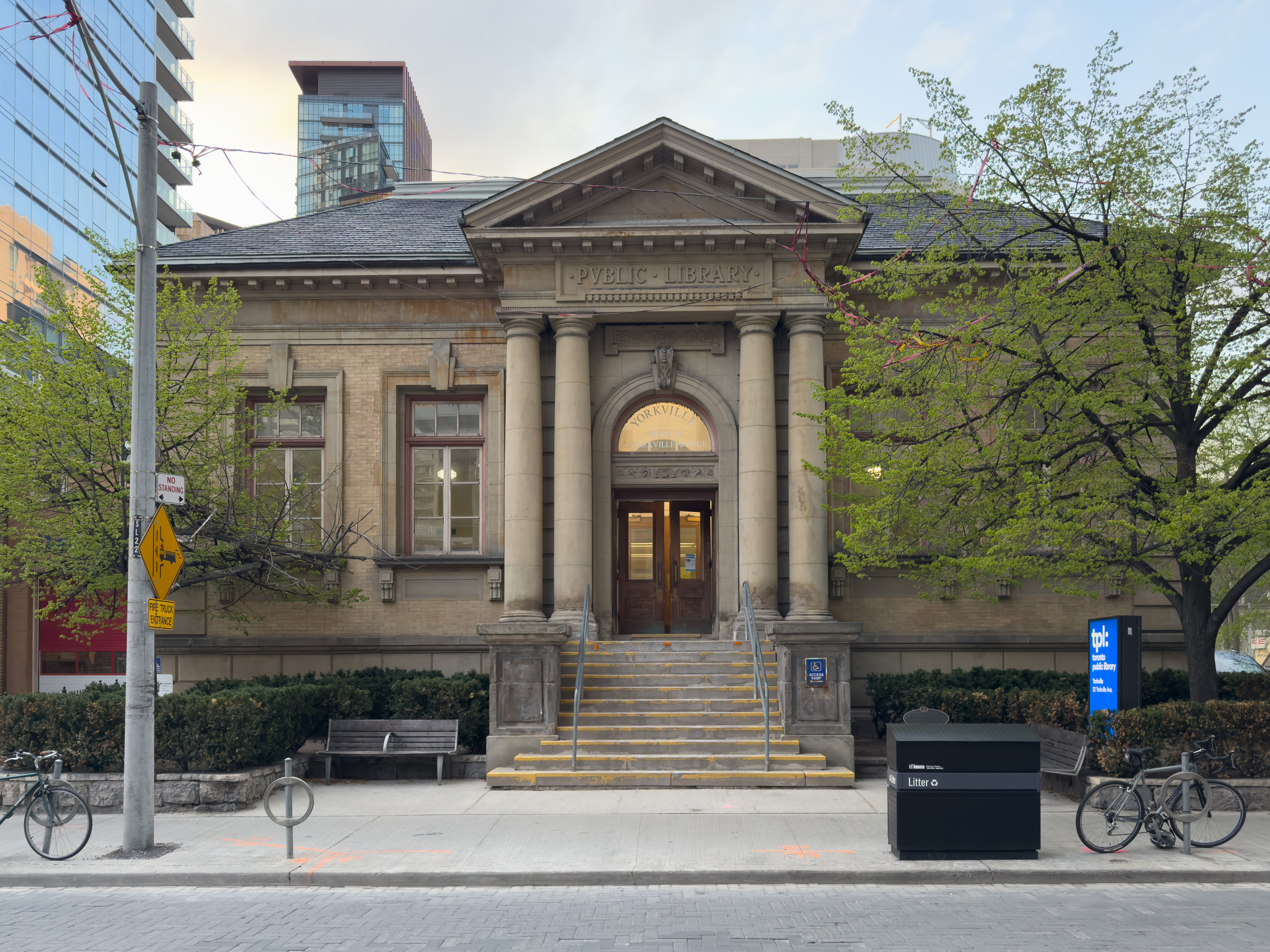
- The library building's exterior
- Interactive map of the Yorkville Library area

General information
- Location: 22 Yorkville Avenue, Toronto, Ontario, Canada
- Coordinates: 43°40′19″N 79°23′19″W

The Yorkville Library is a branch of the Toronto Public Library in Toronto's Yorkville neighborhood, in Ontario, Canada. Established in 1907, the branch is Toronto Public Library's oldest. This library and the Toronto Reference Library form the closest distance between two library locations, at only 100m away from each other.

== See also ==
- List of Toronto Public Library branches
