= Cooke's Presbyterian Church =

Former Presbyterian Church in Toronto, Ontario

Cooke's Presbyterian Church in 1956

Cooke's Presbyterian Church was a Presbyterian congregation in Toronto, Ontario, Canada, active from 1851 to 1982.

Founded in 1851 to serve Toronto's growing Irish Presbyterian community, the congregation was based for much of its history at the corner of Queen Street East and Mutual Street. At its peak, it was the largest Presbyterian congregation in Canada. Declining membership led to the church's closure in 1982, and its building was demolished in 1984.

== History ==
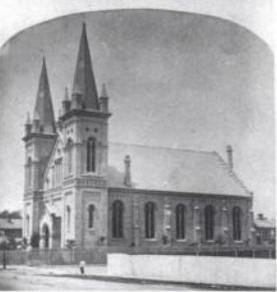
The first Cooke's Presbyterian Church in 1859

In 1851, a group of Irish Presbyterians in Toronto began holding services in private homes. The city's First Presbyterian Church was predominantly Scottish, prompting the Irish Presbyterians to seek a congregation of their own. The congregation initially attempted to call a minister from Ireland and align themselves with the Presbyterian Church in Ireland. Later that year, the group received permission from the Toronto Presbytery to establish a separate congregation.

The congregation raised funds for a ministers' stipend and began to meet in St. Lawrence Hall and a former Methodist church on George Street. A lot was secured at the corner of Queen Street and Mutual Street for £475 and a permanent brick structure was erected in 1856. The church was named for Henry Cooke, a Presbyterian minister known for his advocacy for "Protestant unity" in Ireland.

The congregation continued to grow throughout the 19th century, bolstered by Irish immigration to Toronto. The church building underwent several renovations and expansions to accommodate its growing membership. In 1891, the congregation decided to demolish the existing building and replace it with a larger church designed by architect Henry Simpson, himself a member of the congregation, with a seating capacity of 2,250.

The congregation reached its peak in the 1920s, when worshippers reportedly had to arrive early to secure a seat. With more than 2,000 members, it was considered the largest Presbyterian congregation in Canada. As a child, actress Mary Pickford sang in the church choir but was reportedly dismissed for making faces. In 1925, the church overwhelming voted to remain Presbyterian, rather than join the United Church of Canada.

Cooke's retained its Irish Presbyterian identity throughout its history, with all but two of its ministers being of Irish descent. Nevertheless, the church was involved in missionary work, especially early involvement in the Toronto Chinese Mission, which eventually evolved into Toronto Chinese (now Cornerstone) Presbyterian Church.

Demographic changes in downtown Toronto following the Second World War, particularly the movement of Protestant families to the suburbs, contributed to the congregation's decline. By its centenary in 1951, membership had fallen to 700, subsequently declining to 400 and eventually 150. The church held its final service on 30 May 1982, after which it closed and the congregation was disbanded.

The property was subsequently purchased by a developer and, despite a last-minute heritage designation, the church building was demolished in April 1984. The site remained a parking lot until the construction of the 88 Queen condominium development in the 2020s.

== See also ==
- List of Presbyterian churches in Toronto
