= Charles Sanderson (footballer) =

English footballer

Personal information
- Full name: Charles Arthur Sanderson
- Date of birth: 9 December 1903
- Place of birth: Hoyland Common, England
- Date of death: 1976 (aged 72–73)
- Position: Wing half

Senior career*
Years	Team	Apps	(Gls)
1922–1923	Wombwell		
1923–1926	Barnsley	24	(0)
1926	Mexborough Athletic		
Total		24	(0)
- * Club domestic league appearances and goals

Charles Arthur Sanderson (9 December 1903 – 1976) was an English footballer who played in the Football League for Barnsley.
