= Alexandra Park, Toronto =

Alexandra Park
- Neighbourhood
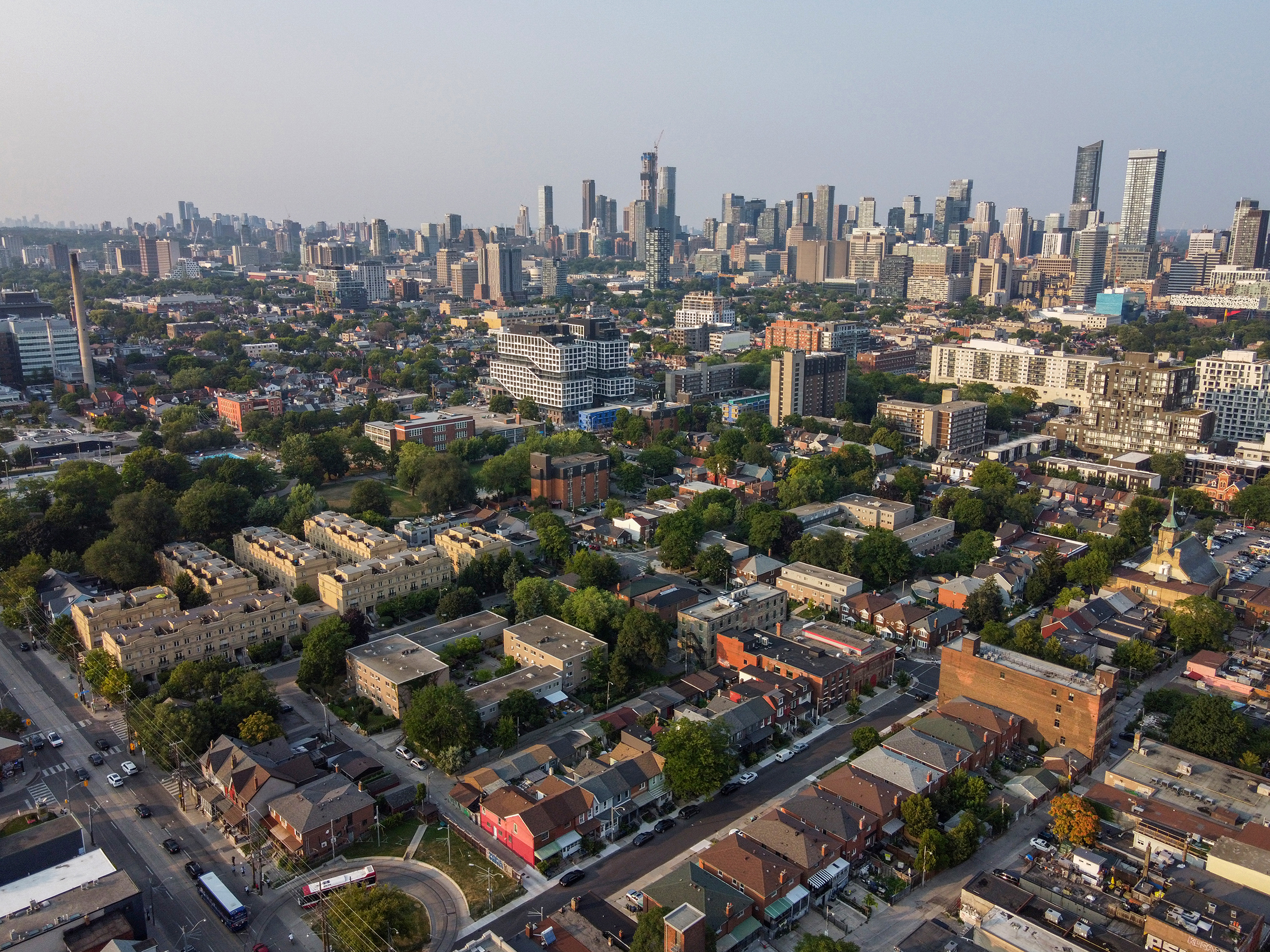
- Buildings in Alexandra Park in 2025

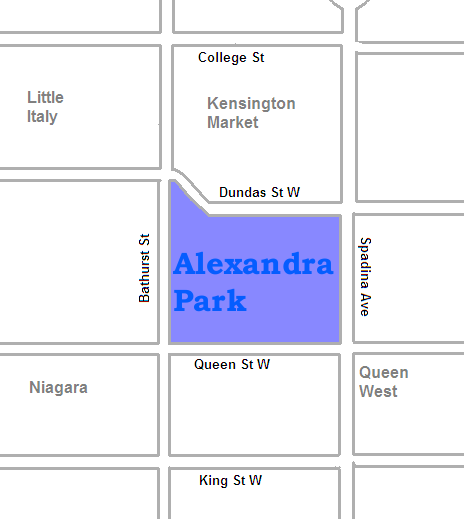

- Location within Toronto
- Coordinates: 43°39′N 79°24′W
- Country: Canada
- Province: Ontario
- City: Toronto

Government
  - MP: Danielle Martin (University-Rosedale)
  - MPP: Chris Glover (Spadina-Fort York)
  - Councillor: Ausma Malik (Ward 10 Spadina—Fort York)

Area
  - Total: 0.318 km^{2} (0.123 sq mi)

Population (2021)
  - Total: 4,505
  - Density: 14,167/km^{2} (36,690/sq mi)

Alexandra Park is a neighbourhood located in downtown Toronto, Ontario, Canada. Alexandra Park is bounded by Dundas Street West on the north, Spadina Avenue on the east, Queen Street West on the south, and Bathurst Street on the west. Alexandra Park consists of private and public housing, with at grade retail along Queen Street West and Spadina Avenue, some institutional, and several commercial buildings scattered through the neighborhood. The neighborhood takes its name from Alexandra Park, a municipal park at the south-east corner of Dundas Street West and Bathurst Street. The park is named for Queen Alexandra, whose husband, King Edward VII, was the first future monarch to visit Toronto.

== History ==
The recorded history of the area begins with the original survey of the northern shore of Lake Ontario conducted by Augustus Jones in 1791. The survey established a baseline soon to be called Lot Street (later renamed Queen Street). The area now known as Alexandra Park was then the southern portions of lots 16, 17 and 18 of Concession 1 of the Township of York. When the City of Toronto was incorporated in 1834, it included the area 400 yards to the north of Queen Street, roughly the location of present-day Grange Street. The remainder of the area was annexed by the city in 1859.

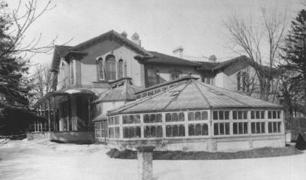
Gzowski Hall at Alexandra Hall, 1896. A branch of the Toronto Public Library presently occupies the site of the Hall.

The area was purchased from the Denison family in 1841 by Sir Casimir Gzowski, a Polish engineer who built his grand home, which he called 'The Hall', at what is now the south-east corner of Dundas St. W. and Bathurst St. A neighbourhood sprang up around Gzowski's home that was inhabited largely by Polish and Ukrainian immigrants in the 1920s and 1930s. In the 1960s, 'The Hall' and many of the surrounding homes were demolished to make way for a public housing project. The public housing projects brought in many migrants from Nova Scotia, as well as many immigrants from the Caribbean, East Africa, China and Vietnam.

Alexandra Park has long been home to a large Black Nova Scotian community, and people of Nova Scotian ancestry are still evident in this neighbourhood. In the 1970s and '80s, there were racial tensions between the established Polish and Ukrainian immigrants and the new immigrants. An infamous African Canadian gang called the Project Originals emerged. Drugs and violence were a huge problem, and during this time, a crack epidemic swept the area. In the early '90s, a group of Alexandra Park residents sought to convert the government housing complex to self-governing co-operative housing, in order to attempt to make a difference in the struggling community in an effort to stop the oppression and drug wars the project had been facing for many decades previous. Today Alexandra Park is recovering from its harsh battles in the past, and making an effort to turn a new leaf.

=== Homeless encampment ===
Alexandra Park was being used as a tent city by a number of unhoused individuals until it was cleared out by a mixture of police and city security, resulting in 9 arrests.

=== Housing ===
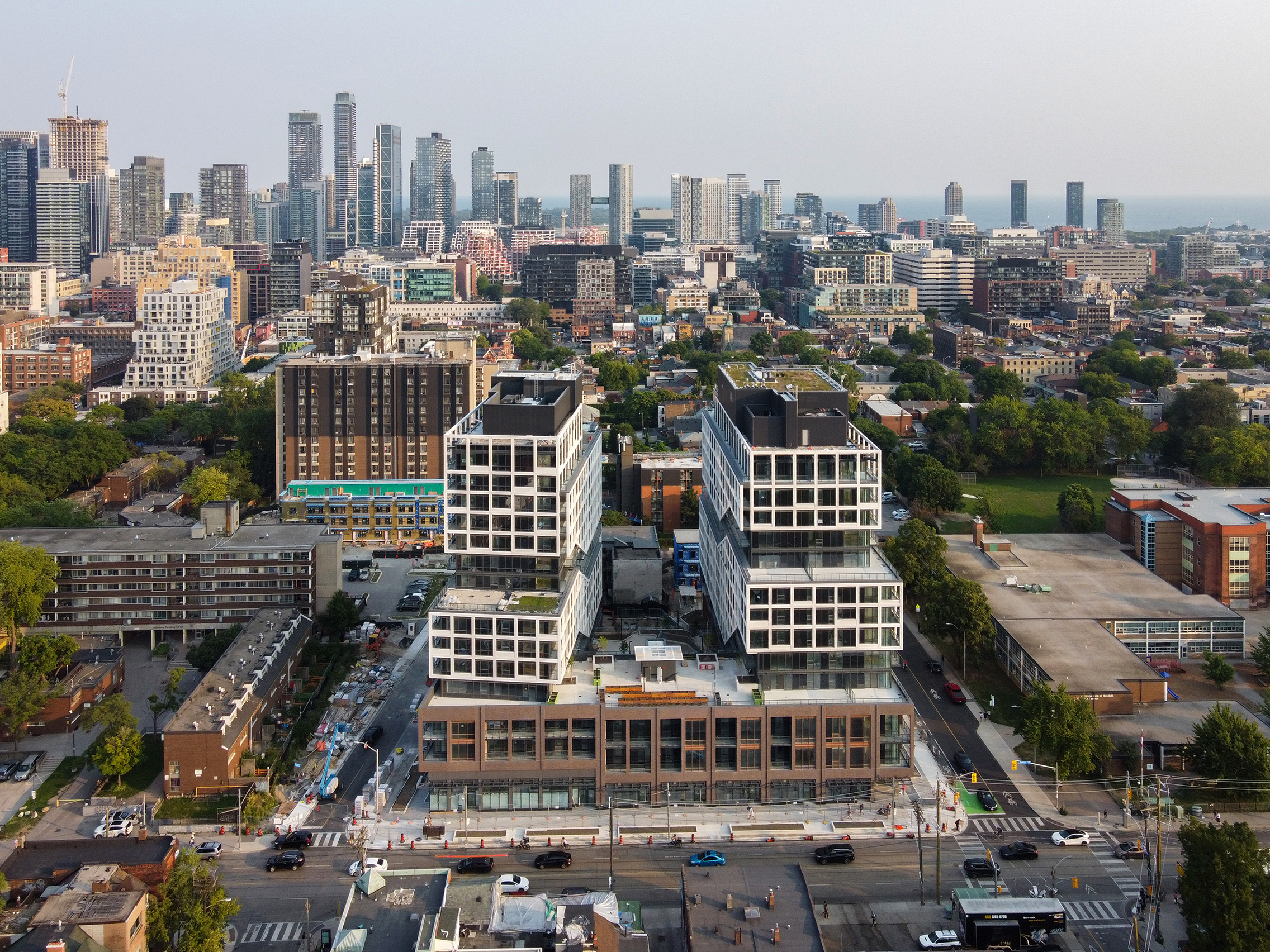
MRKT Alexandra Park Condos completed in 2025

After a long period of community consultation, The Toronto Community Housing Corporation (TCHC) has completed plans for a major revitalization of Atkinson Co-op and surrounding areas of Alexandra Park. TCHC submitted Official Plan Amendment and Rezoning applications on March 11, 2011 and held a community meeting on June 27, 2011 to present the plan to local residents. The plan envisages major changes to the neighborhood, phased in over a 15-year period. Several streets that were closed off when the complex was first constructed will be reopened. 333 townhouses and apartments will be demolished and replaced, while 473 units in the towers at 20 Vanauley Street, 91 Augusta Street and 71 Augusta Square will be renovated. 1540 units of market condominiums and townhouses will be added, with retail units on the south side of Dundas Street West. New public parks and private amenity spaces will also be added.

== Culture and recreation ==
Theatre Passe Muraille is located in the neighbourhood. The City of Toronto operates Alexandra Park swimming pool while the Scadding Court Community Centre and the Charles R. Sanderson Memorial Branch of the Toronto Public Library share a building on the grounds of Alexandra Park, part of Toronto's municipal park system. Scadding Court is also home to Alexandra Park Neighbourhood Learning Centre, an adult literacy program that offers Literacy Basic Skills (LBS) and Academic and Career Entrance (ACE) courses. Alexandra Park also offers an outdoor skating rink in the winter, that is converted to a skateboard park in the summer. The skateboard park is nicknamed Dunbat Skate Park, referencing its location at the corner of Dundas Street West and Bathurst Street.

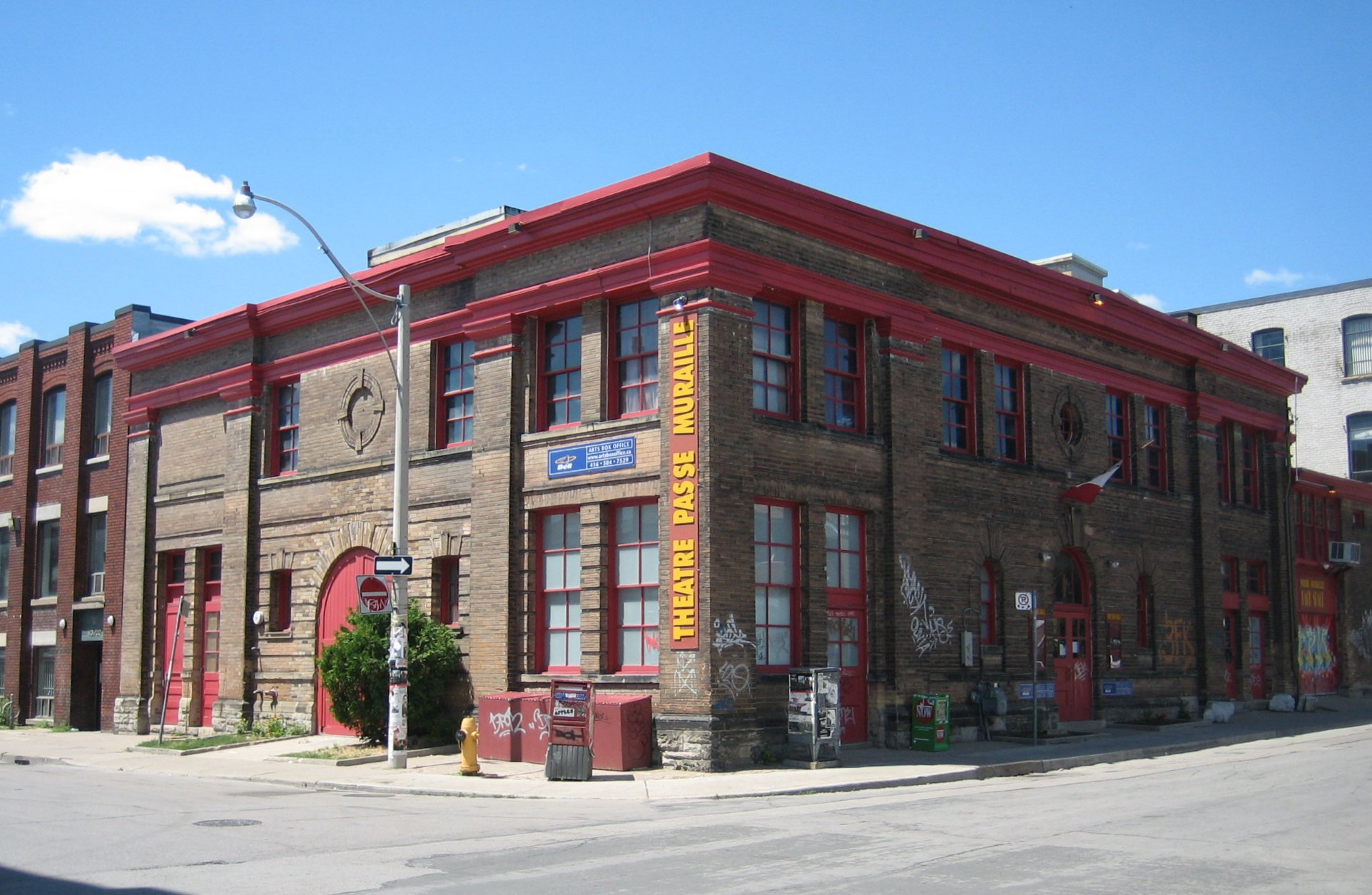
The Theatre Passe Muraille theatre company is based in Alexandra Park.

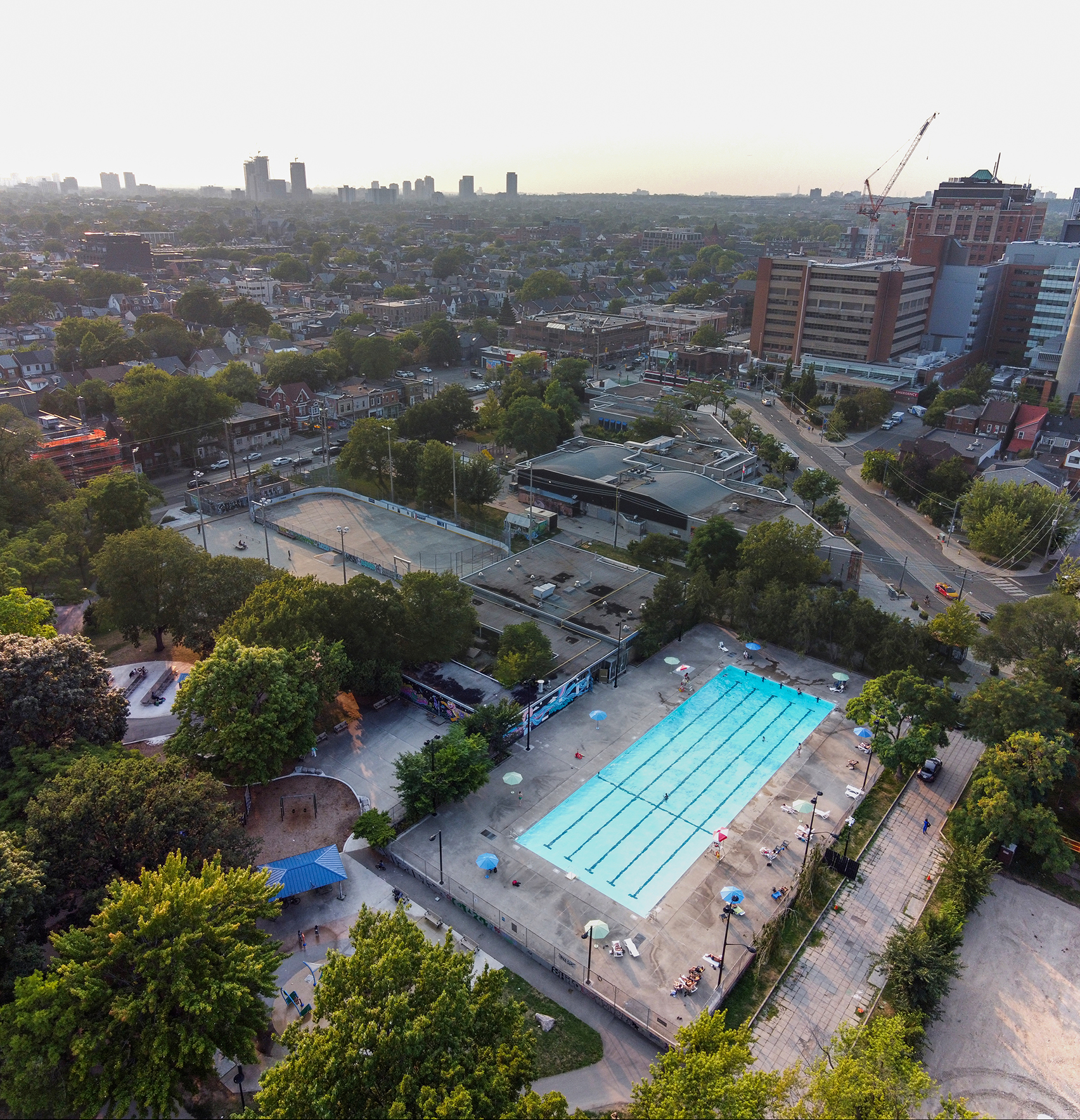
Scadding Court Community Centre

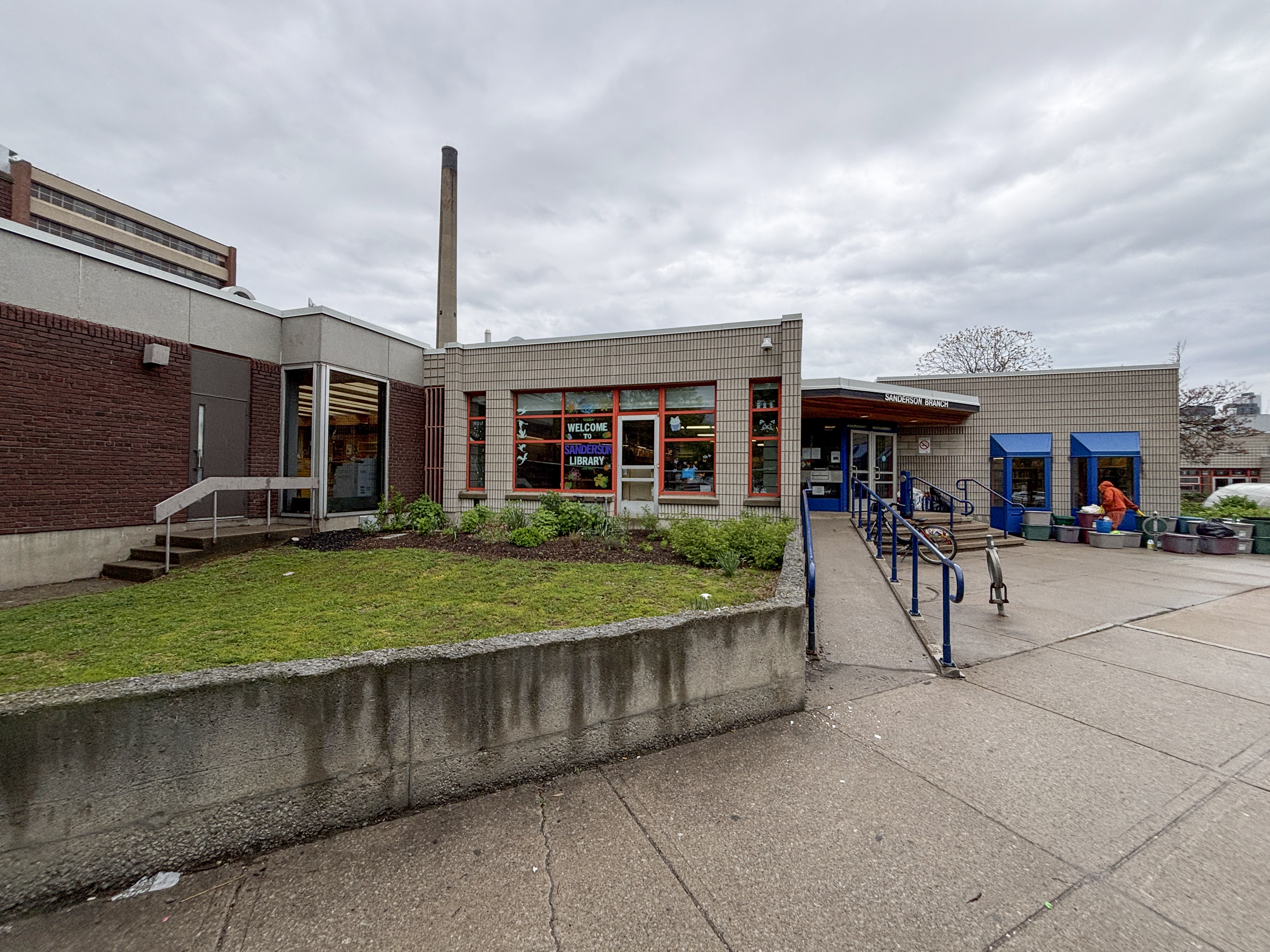
Toronto Public Library-Sanderson Branch

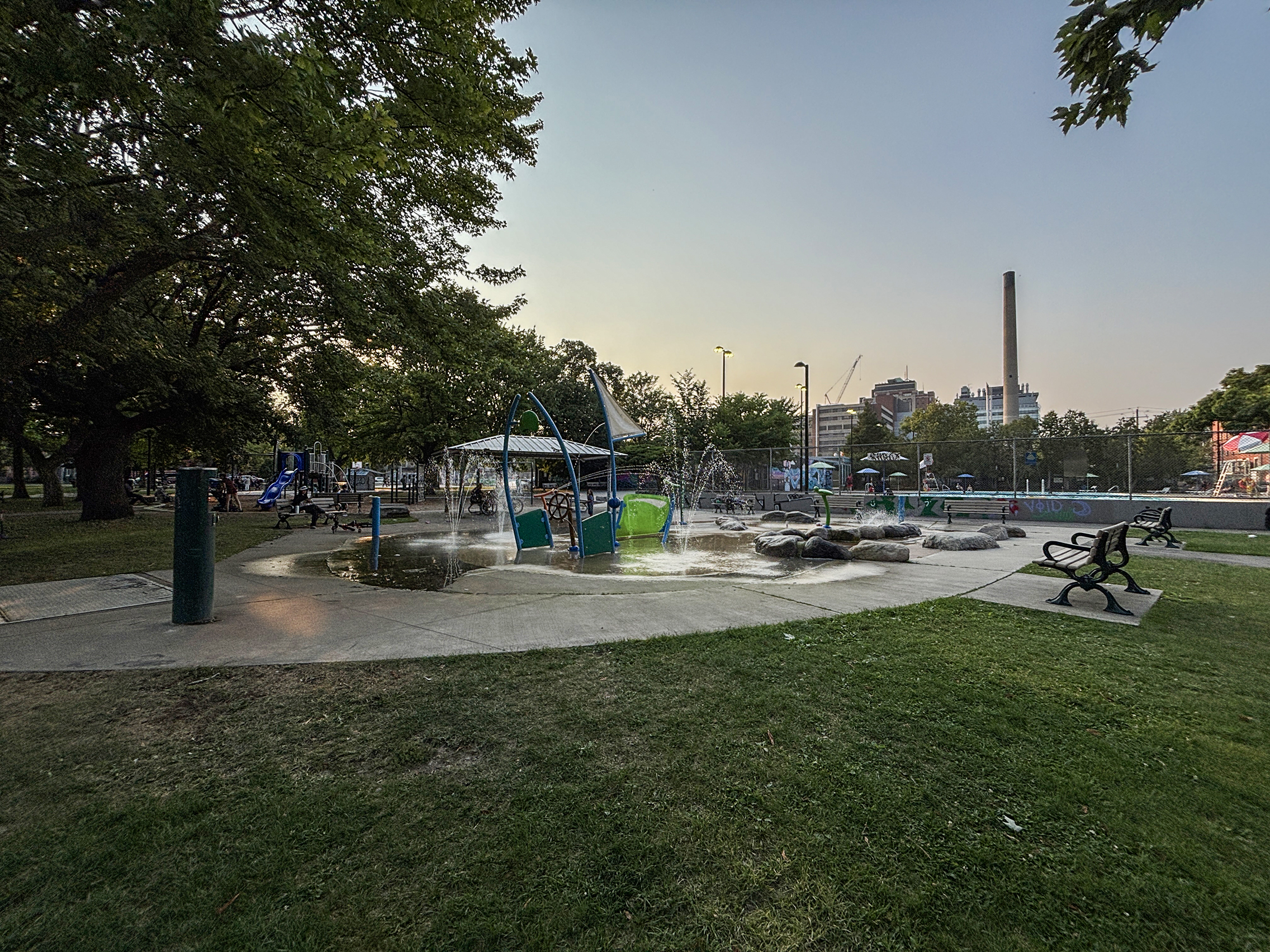
Alexandra Park

== Demographics ==
Historical population
Year	Pop.	±%
2006	4,355	—
2011	4,676	+7.4%
2016	4,192	−10.4%
2021	4,505	+7.5%

As of 2021, the Alexandra Park neighbourhood had a population of 4,505. The most commonly spoken languages after English are Mandarin and Cantonese.

Major racial and ethnic populations (2021):

- 32.7% Chinese
- 24.8% European
- 13.5% Black
- 4.6% Southeast Asian; mostly Vietnamese
- 4.4% Multiracial

== See also ==
- Royal eponyms in Canada
