= Knox United Church (Scarborough) =

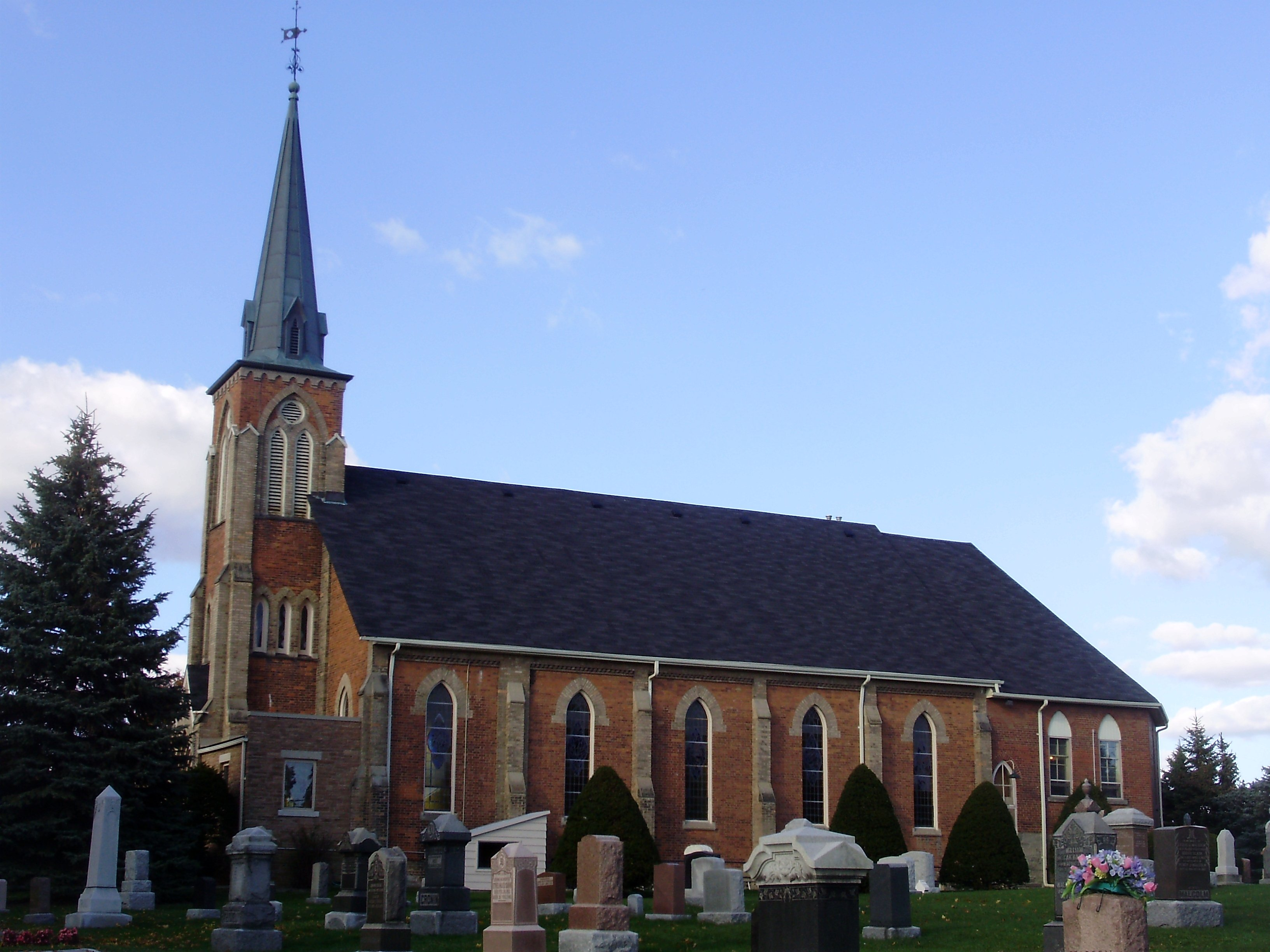

- 43°47′10″N 79°16′42″W
- Location: Toronto, Ontario, Canada
- Denomination: United Church of Canada
- Website: Knox United Agincourt

Administration
- Province: Ontario

Clergy
- Pastor(s): Linda Petrides (Minister of Visitation and Seniors Programming)

The Knox United Church, began as Knox Presbyterian Church in Scarborough, Toronto, Ontario, Canada, in a wood-frame church built in 1848, the result of the Church of Scotland disruption, that led to the formation of the Presbyterian Church of Canada in Connection with the Free Church of Scotland.

Elder William Clarke, Sr., was one of the group who withdrew from the "Auld Kirk" at the Synod Meeting held in Kingston, Canada West, in July 1844; his Minister, Rev. James George, and much of the Presbyterian Church at Scarborough in Connection with the Church of Scotland (now St. Andrew's Presbyterian Church, Scarborough, located north of Thomson Memorial Park) remained.

The original Knox Congregation (named after Scottish Church reformer John Knox) met first with another congregation located in York Mills, until settling in the developing Scarborough Township village of Agincourt.

40 local residents became the first communicants of Knox Presbyterian Church, originally known as "Knox's Church Scarboro".

In 1853, it became the centre of the "Scarborough Township Pastoral Charge", along with Melville (formed 1851) in West Hill; Zion Church, Cedar Grove (formed 1855) in Markham Township; Chalmers Church, York Town Line (1863–1890); and other occasional preaching points.

By 1883, Knox Church had grown to become a single-point charge.

With a growing membership, the current brick church was built in 1872. This church stands at 2569 Midland Avenue at the corner of Sheppard Avenue East, surrounded by a large cemetery containing many early settlers, and a number of prominent church leaders.

In 1925, this Presbyterian congregation voted 136–106 to be part of the new United Church of Canada. A number of members left to form a "Continuing" Knox Presbyterian Church, now located nearby at 4156 Sheppard Avenue East.

The Christian Education Centre was added in the 1950s.

== See also ==
- List of oldest buildings and structures in Toronto
- List of United Church of Canada churches in Toronto
