= Evelyn Gregory =

Canadian librarian

Evelyn Gregory was the chief librarian of York Township Public Library from its inception in 1945 to 1969.

During her time with the library, she ran the main branch located on Eglinton Avenue, oversaw four additional branches, and started a bookmobile to support the borough. Her leadership was lauded, with local press noting that the bookmobile had an annual circulation in 1950 of 60,000. In 1959, Gregory reported to a Toronto Daily Star reporter that the library had four copies of Lolita, available upon request, and had no plans to remove it from circulation, although many local library systems had refused to carry the novel.

Gregory was actively involved in the Ontario Library Association, serving as an officer in 1964 and as vice president in 1966.

Gregory was most likely a graduate of Trinity College from the 1920s as she was an active member of the St. Hilda's College Alumna association, hosting community events and fundraising in the 1930s. She also served as a councilor for the organization in 1929. She was involved in the founding of The Terrace, a residence for "business and professional women" run by the Sisters of St. John, located on Brunswick Avenue.

On February 18, 1968, a new library branch was opened in York Borough which was named in honour of Gregory. She retired as chief librarian in 1969.
