= Agincourt Mall =

Shopping mall in Ontario, Canada

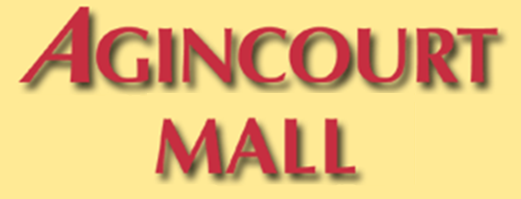

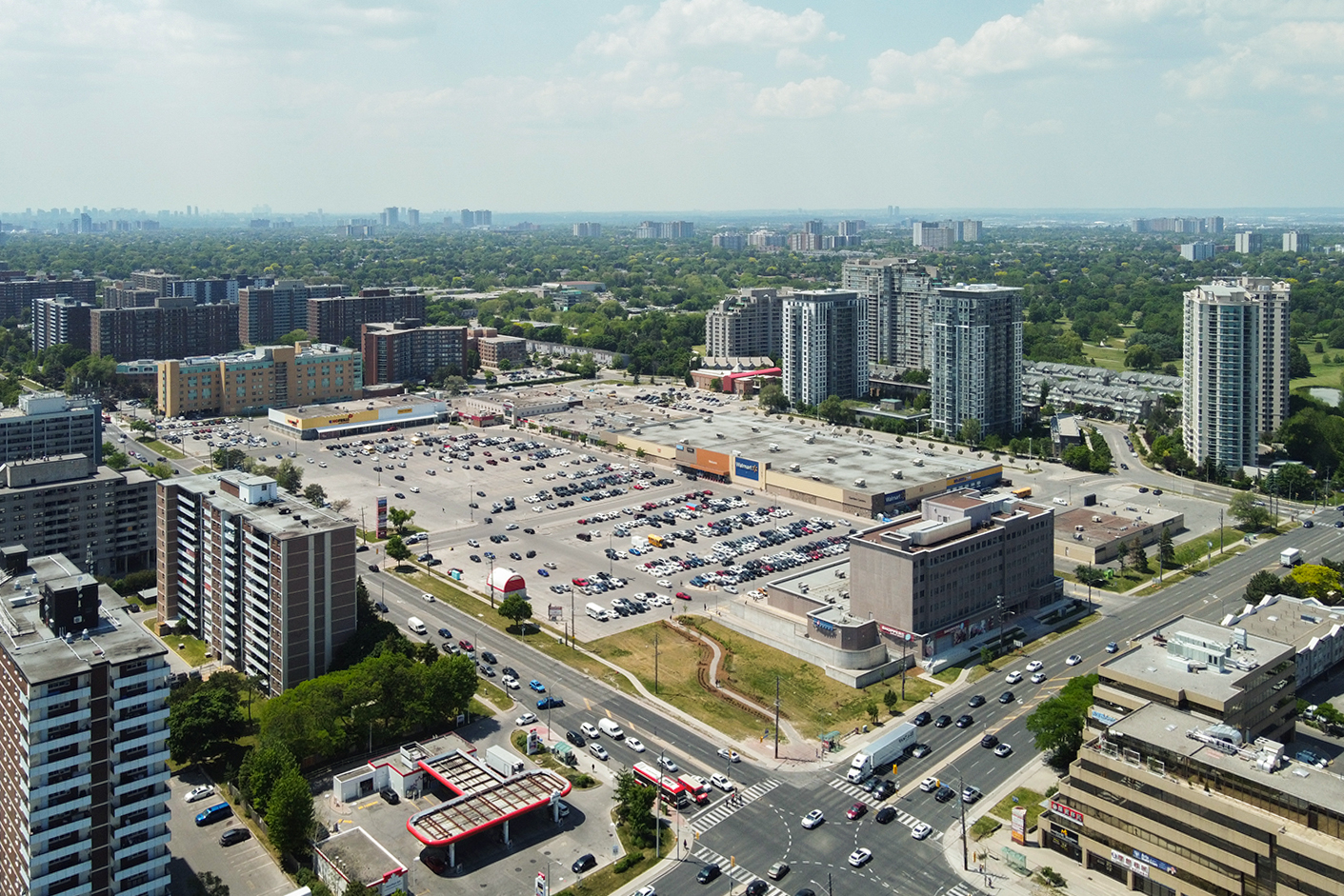
- Coordinates: 43.7851°N 79.2920°W
- Address: 3850 Sheppard Avenue East; Toronto, Ontario; M1T 3L4
- Opened: October 26, 1966
- Num. of stores: 60+
- Num. of anchor tenants: 2
- Floor area: 317,425 sq ft (29,490 m^{2})
- Floors: 2
- Parking: 1700
- Website: www.agincourtmall.com

Agincourt Mall is a shopping mall in Toronto, Ontario, Canada. It is located at the northwest corner of Kennedy Road and Sheppard Avenue, in the Tam O'Shanter – Sullivan neighbourhood of northeastern Toronto. It is named for the adjacent historic village and current Toronto neighbourhood of Agincourt.

== Description ==
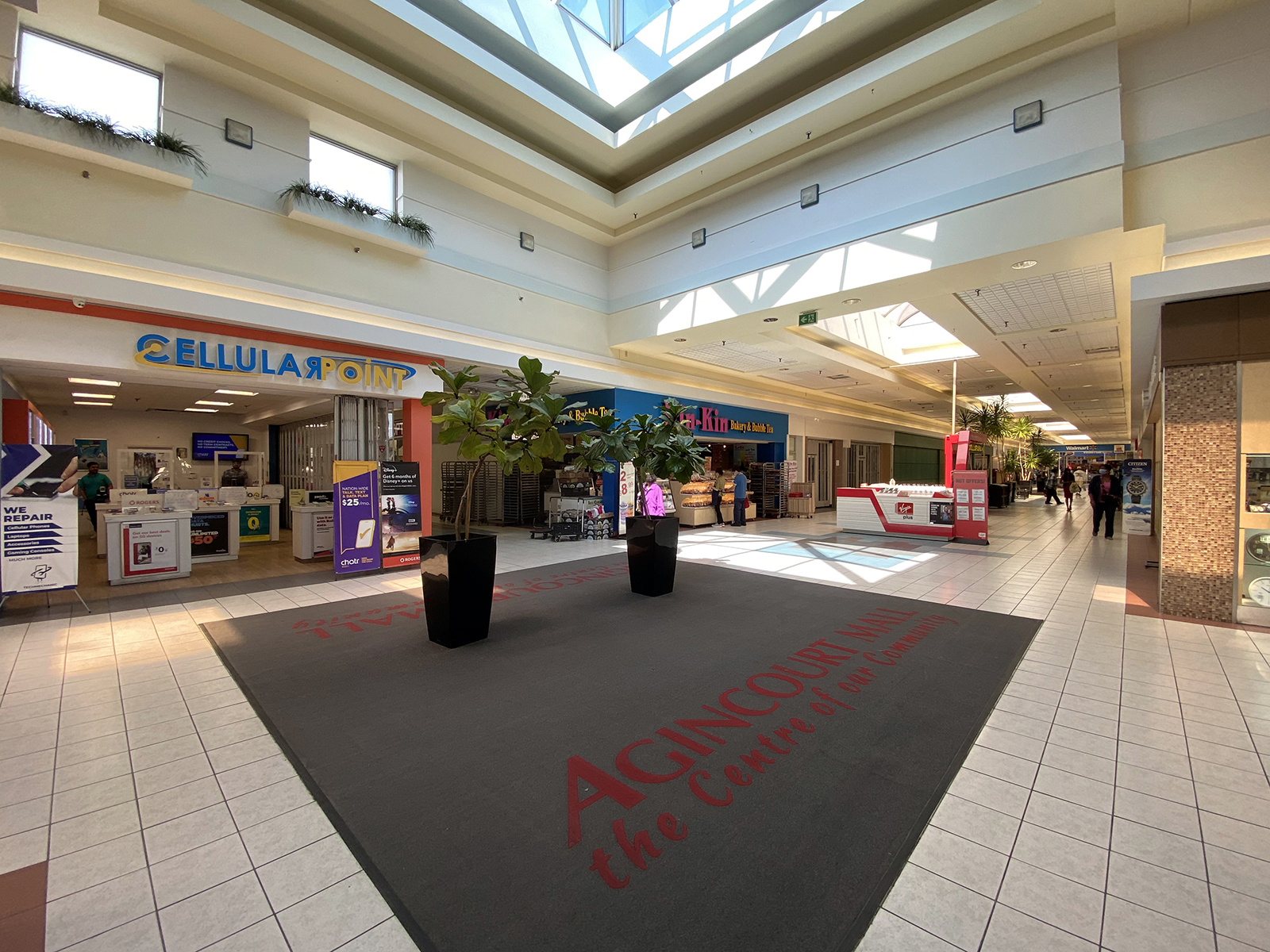
Mall Interior

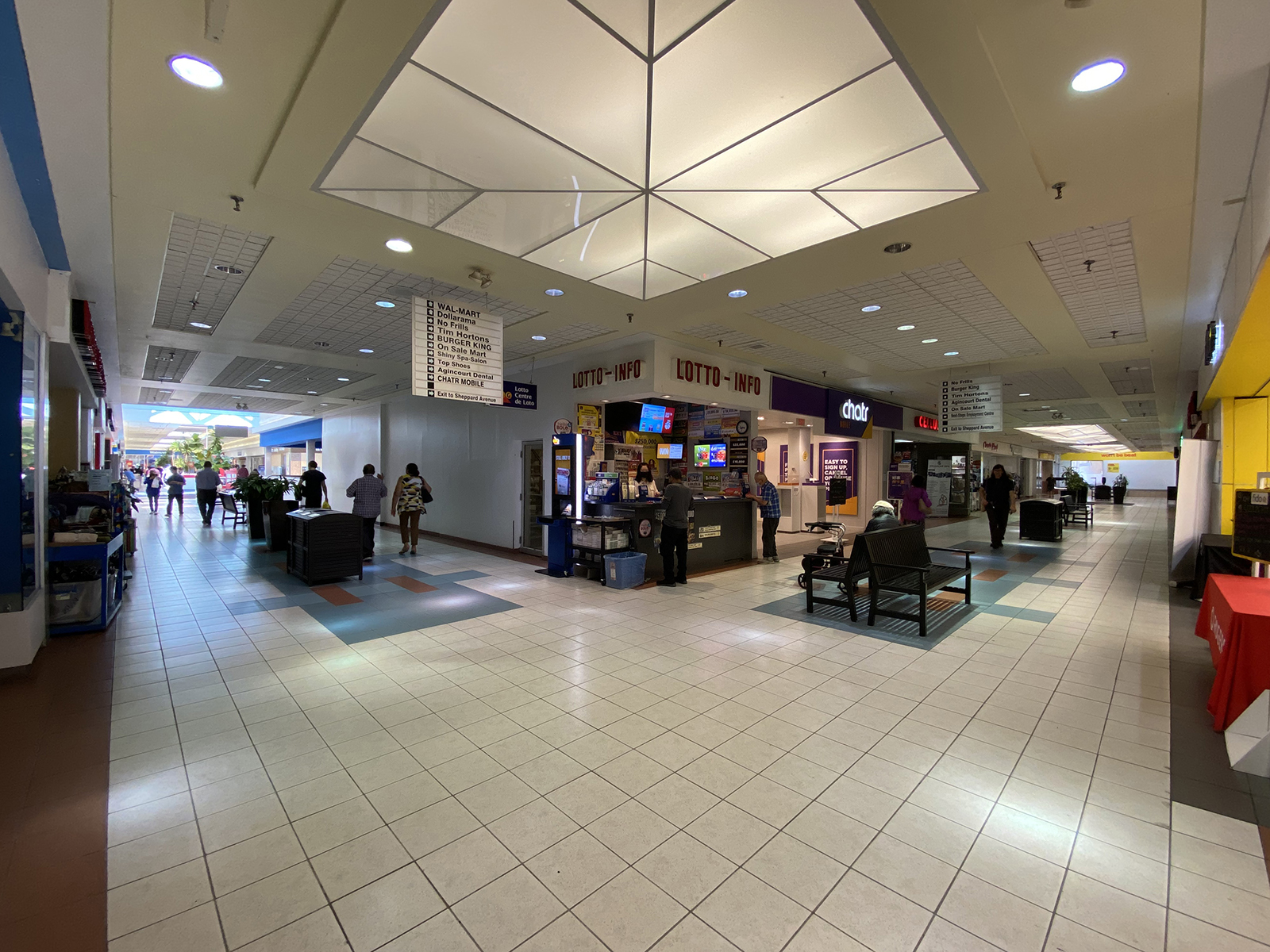
Shops inside the mall

The mall's main tenants are Walmart and No Frills. The mall has one major east-west walkway with the No Frills on the south-west corner and the Walmart on the east end. In the parking lot of the mall is a large drug store. The mall has north and south parking lots, which take up most of the property and the mall is set back from Sheppard Avenue and Kennedy Road.

== History ==
Agincourt Mall opened on Wednesday, November 23, 1966. It was the first indoor shopping mall in Scarborough, with Woolco as the anchor retail store. Given the pre-Christmas date, Santa Claus attended, handing out candy canes.

Scarborough Public Library operated a small branch (Agincourt Neighbourhood Library) in the mall since 1967, but it was relocated in 1991 to a new building at 155 Bonis Avenue (as Agincourt District) in behind the mall and run by Toronto Public Library since 1998.

In March 2011, shoppers were forced to evacuate from the mall due to a presence of smoke. According to Toronto police Staff Sgt. Karl Heilimo, a fire started shortly after 6 p.m. in a hydro transformer approximately 15 to 20 feet from the building and left the mall without power. No injuries were reported.

=== Redevelopment ===
The mall's location is now the subject of a redevelopment proposal. In June 2017, the City Planning Division received an Official Plan Amendment (OPA) to permit the redevelopment of the commercial property. The project, developed by the North American Development Group, is the second-largest active residential application in Toronto. Given the size and complexity of the project, the City of Toronto launched its own Planning Framework Review to inform recommendations on the application and manage future expansion for the mall and its surrounding area. Redevelopment across the site is projected to benefit from urban intensification initiatives with the vision for high quality, sustainable growth to the community.

The master plan proposed by architects Giannone Petricone Associates calls for approximately 440,000 m^{2} of new spaces including the use for residential, retail, office, community space, and a public park. Within the mix of land uses would consists of 406,040 m^{2} of residential uses, 8,490 m^{2} of office uses, 23,685 m^{2} of commercial retail uses, and 1,940 m^{2} of community facility space, and 17,500 m^{2} of open space linking greenways to other public and private squares. Among the major public space proposed is a 2-acre central public park on the west end and a pedestrianized road that act as a gateway to the complex from Sheppard. Development for the site plans of thirteen towers widely spaced across seven blocks, with a mix of low-rise to high-rise building units. While most of the retail spaces are arranged for shops to face towards the street, two larger spaces located centrally are planned so that the two main anchor tenants, Nick’s No Frills and Walmart can reopen in the development.

Area residents were briefed on the proposal in 2017. However, many are worried about the impact it has to the community such as local traffic congestions and the lack of light, wind, and shadow due to high-rise buildings units.

=== Incidents ===
Serial killer Bruce McArthur was a mall Santa at this mall "as recently as" 2016. No incidents are known to have occurred.

In August 2018, a 35-year-old man was stabbed in front of the LCBO store of the mall, sustaining serious lower body injuries.
