= Agincourt, Toronto =

Agincourt
- Neighbourhood
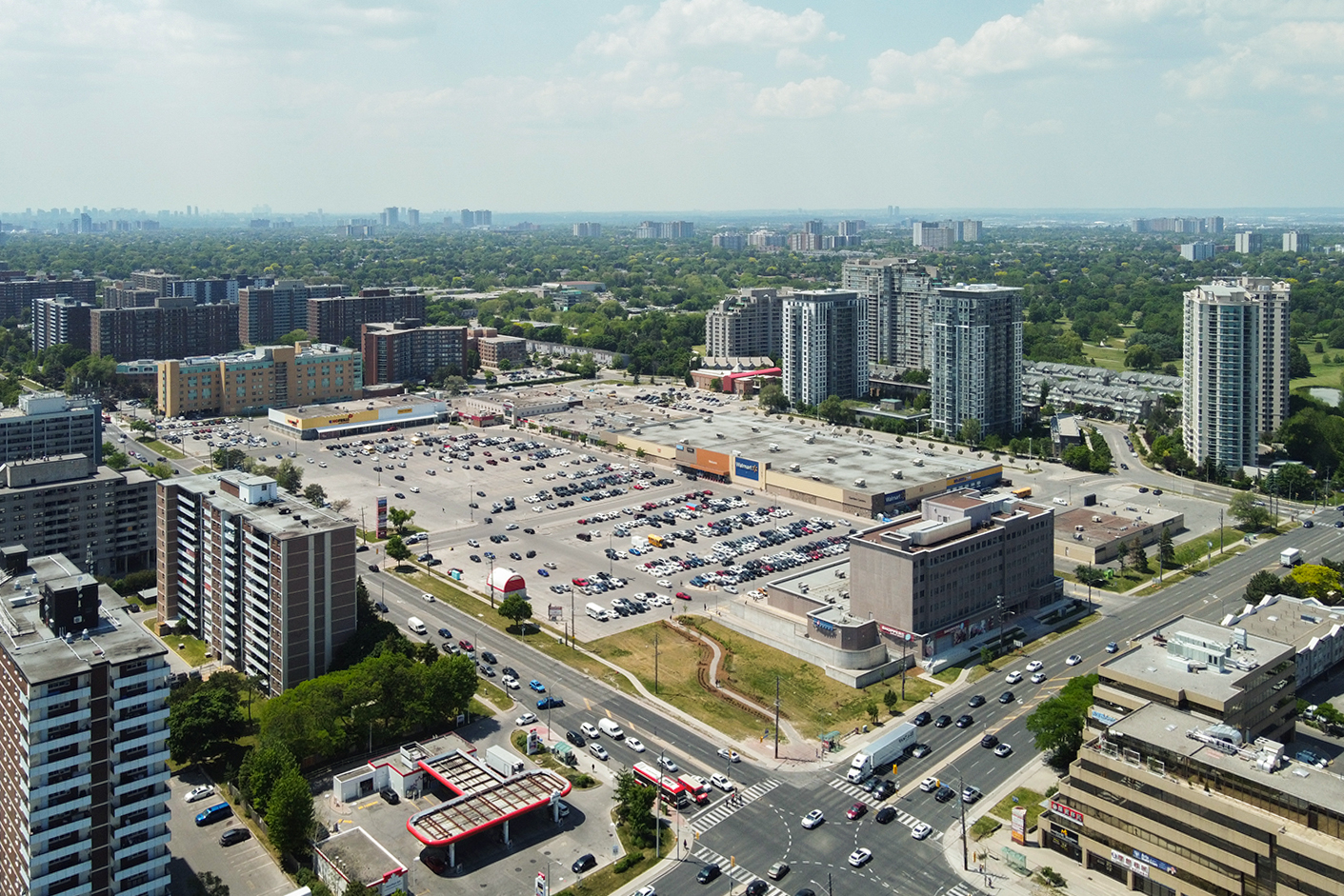
- Aerial view of Agincourt in 2023

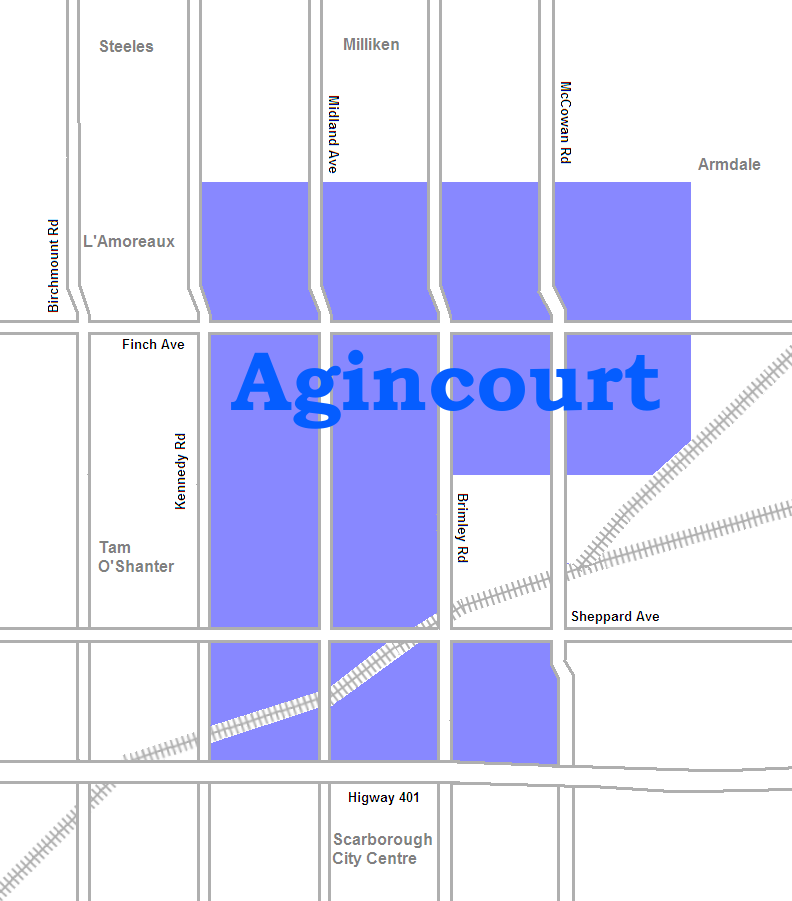
- Vicinity

- Location within Toronto
- Coordinates: 43°47′33″N 79°17′02″W
- Country: Canada
- Province: Ontario
- City: Toronto
- Municipality established: 1850 Scarborough Township
- Postal village: 1858
- Joined: 1953 Metropolitan Toronto

Government
  - MP: Shaun Chen (L) (Scarborough North); Jean Yip (L) (Scarborough—Agincourt)
  - MPP: Raymond Cho (PC) (Scarborough North); Aris Babikian (PC) (Scarborough—Agincourt)
  - Councillor: Nick Mantas (Ward 22 Scarborough—Agincourt); Jamaal Myers (Ward 23 Scarborough North)

Agincourt (/ˈeɪ.dʒɪn.kɔːrt/) is a neighbourhood and former village in Toronto, Ontario, Canada. Agincourt is located in northeast Toronto, along Sheppard Avenue between Kennedy and Markham Roads (north-south includes lands between Highway 401 and Finch Avenue). Before the creation of the "megacity" of Toronto in 1998, the area was part of Scarborough. It is officially recognized by the City of Toronto as occupying the neighbourhoods of Agincourt South–Malvern West and Agincourt North.

The name Agincourt is often used to refer to a larger area of northwest Scarborough rather than just the officially recognized neighbourhood. The area to the west of Agincourt, officially named Tam O'Shanter–Sullivan is often included as part of Agincourt, and the Agincourt Mall is located in Tam O'Shanter.

The section of Agincourt west of Midland Avenue belongs to the electoral district of Scarborough—Agincourt, while the section to the east is part of Scarborough North (federal, previously Scarborough—Rouge River) or Scarborough—Rouge River (provincial, until the 2018 provincial election, when it will be replaced with Scarborough North).

== History ==
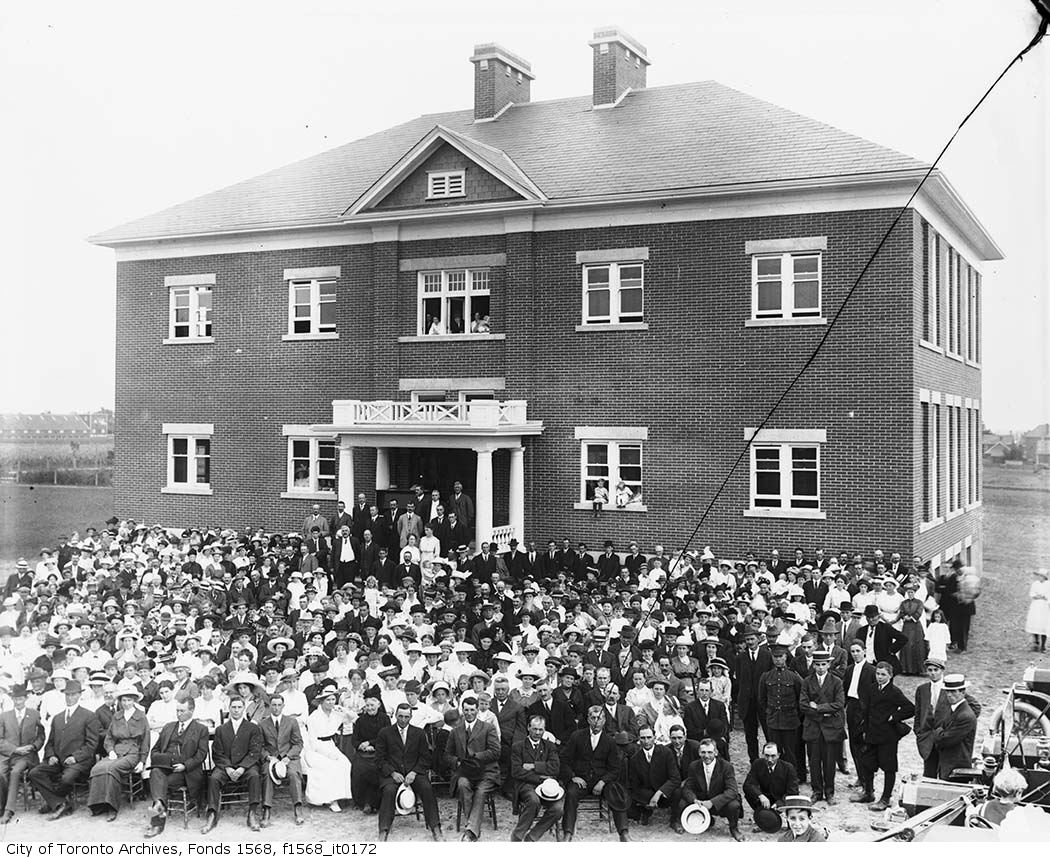
Agincourt Public School was established in 1914. Agincourt Collegiate Institute would occupy the second floor from 1915 to 1929.

In 1848, a group of Presbyterians founded the Knox Church congregation in a northern rural community of Scarborough that would later become the village of Agincourt. Their first place of worship was a wooden-frame church located at the northeast corner of Sheppard Avenue and Midland Avenue.

The name Agincourt dates back to June 1858, when John Hill was granted permission to open a post office in his general store, at the corner of what is now Brimley Road and Sheppard Avenue. Local legend has it that the name was chosen when Hill requested that the town be given a post office, and the French-Canadian Postmaster agreed, on the condition that it be given a French name, with 'Agincourt' (a reference to Henry V's decisive English victory over French forces in 1415) chosen to undermine the Postmaster's intention. At the time, the area was mostly occupied by open fields, barns and scattered farmhouses.

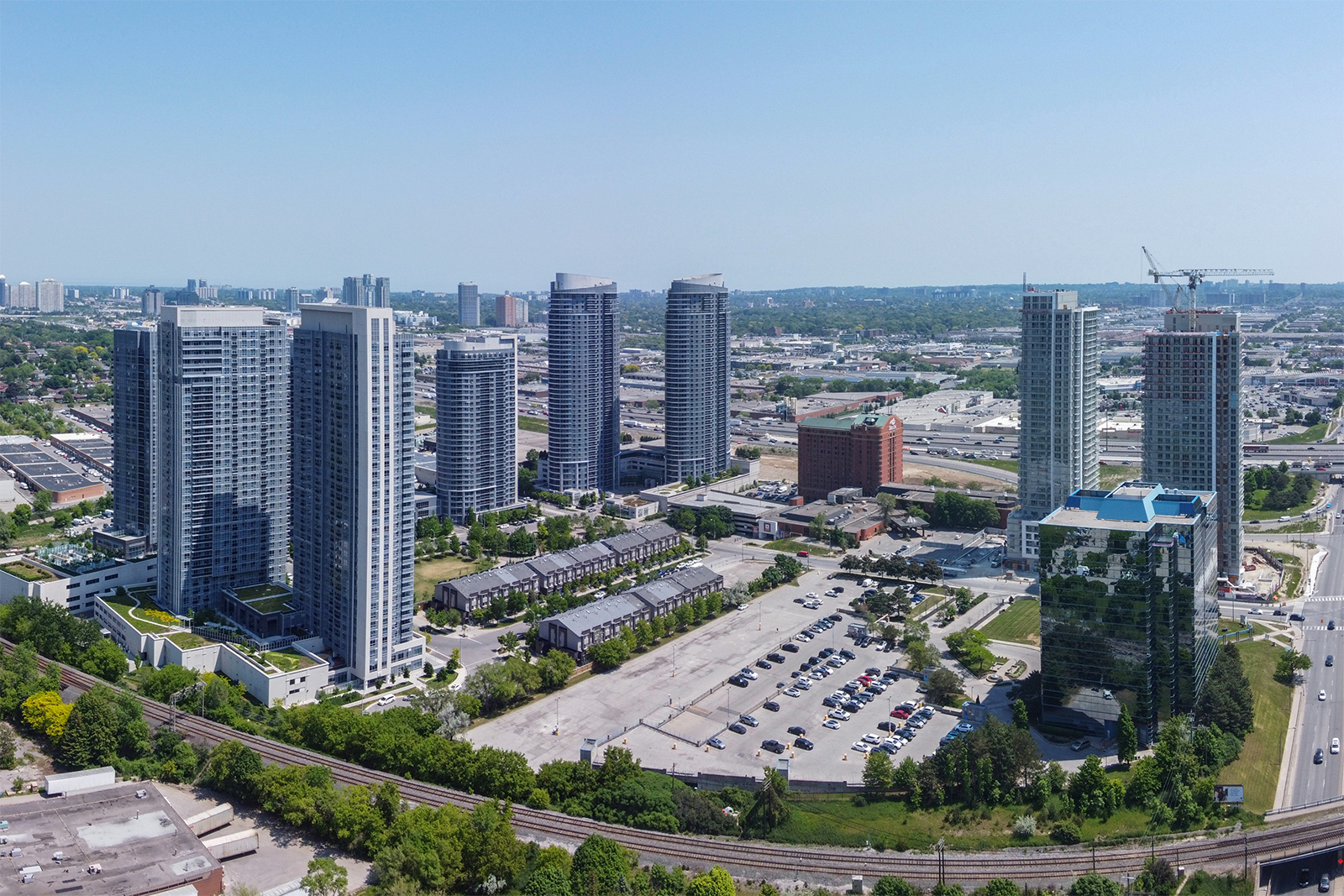
Agincourt from Kennedy Road and Village Green Square

By 1872 as the population grew, the first church was replaced by a large brick church which is today's Knox United Church. In addition, Agincourt Public School was built in 1914, which has evolved over time into Agincourt Junior Public School. A secondary school that later evolved into Agincourt Collegiate Institute, was established in 1915 on the second floor of the same building (from 1954 to 1998, the schools were a part of the Scarborough Board of Education). In 1925, the Agincourt Association Library constructed its own public library building on the west side of Midland Avenue, just north of Sheppard Avenue.

Two railway stations were constructed in the second half of the 19th century at Agincourt. One was built just west of the crossroads as part of the Toronto and Nipissing Railway line heading north from Scarborough Junction on the Toronto – Montreal mainline, and greatly improved access. The line eventually became part of Canadian National Railways, and the station operates today as Agincourt Station on the GO Transit Stouffville commuter rail route. A second station was built east of the crossroads, northside of Sheppard Avenue and west of Brimley Road, on what is today CP Rail track that runs from downtown Toronto diagonally northeast through the neighbourhood. Commuter rail service to Toronto's Union Station was offered by the CPR from various service routes such as Lake Ontario Shore Line and Toronto-Peterboro Dayliner (1950s). CP passenger service was discontinued in 1982 but revived briefly in 1985 before being cancelled for good in 1990. The line branches east of a marshalling yard, built by CP in the 1960s between McCowan and Markham Roads on the east of the neighbourhood, into the (Peterborough–) Havelock and Belleville (– Montreal) subdivisions.

Agincourt saw an influx of Hong Kong Chinese and Taiwanese emigrants during the 1980s, especially in the area along Sheppard Avenue near Midland Avenue. Since the development of Chinese-themed shopping centres in the 1980s, it has become a booming suburban Toronto Chinatown and was the vanguard for the proliferation of "Chinese malls", catering specifically to the Chinese community across the GTA.

== Economy ==
Agincourt Mall, an enclosed mall, began a redevelopment in 2018, and is the second-largest active residential application in Toronto.

== Education ==
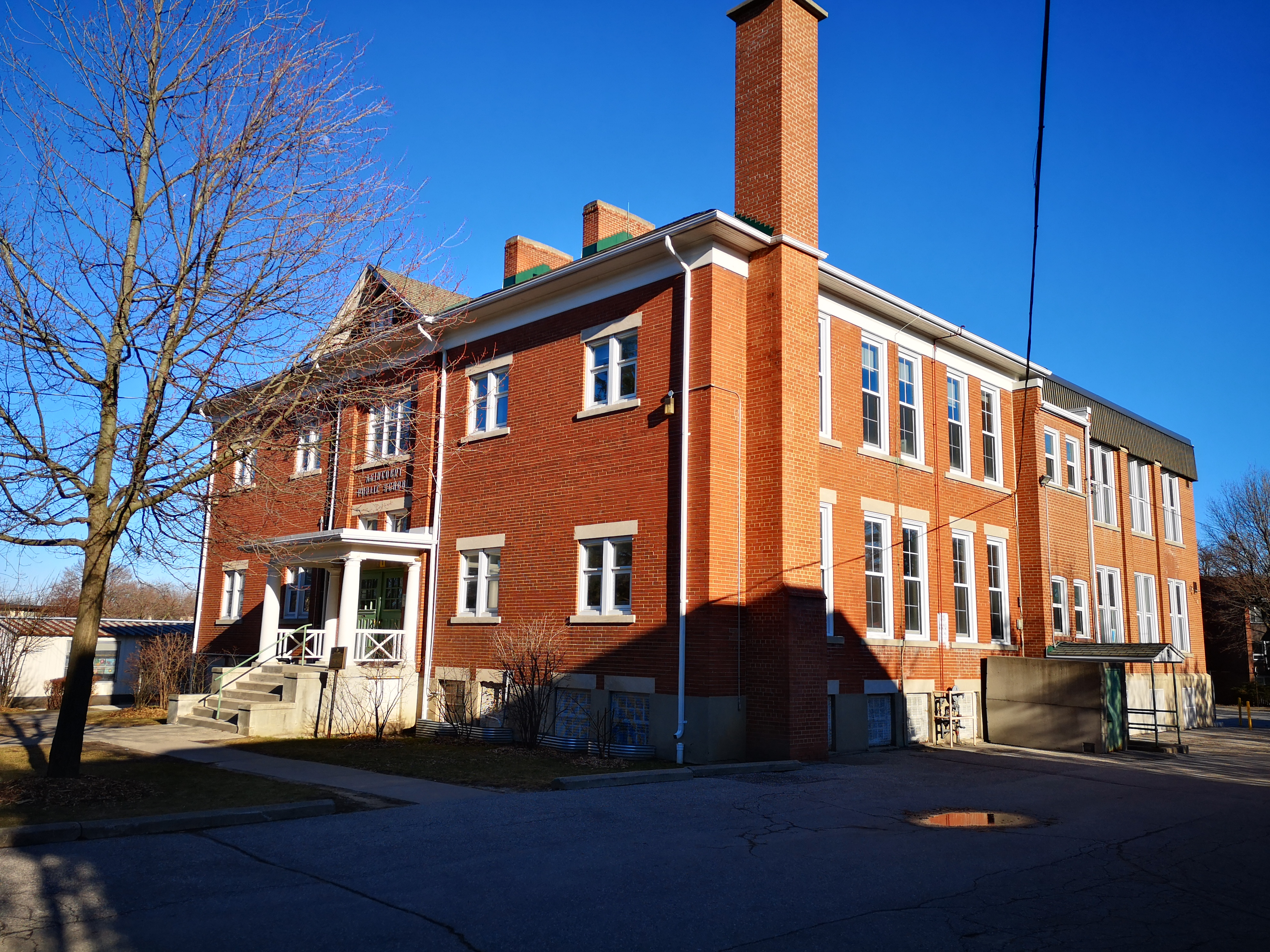
Agincourt Junior Public School, erected in 1915.

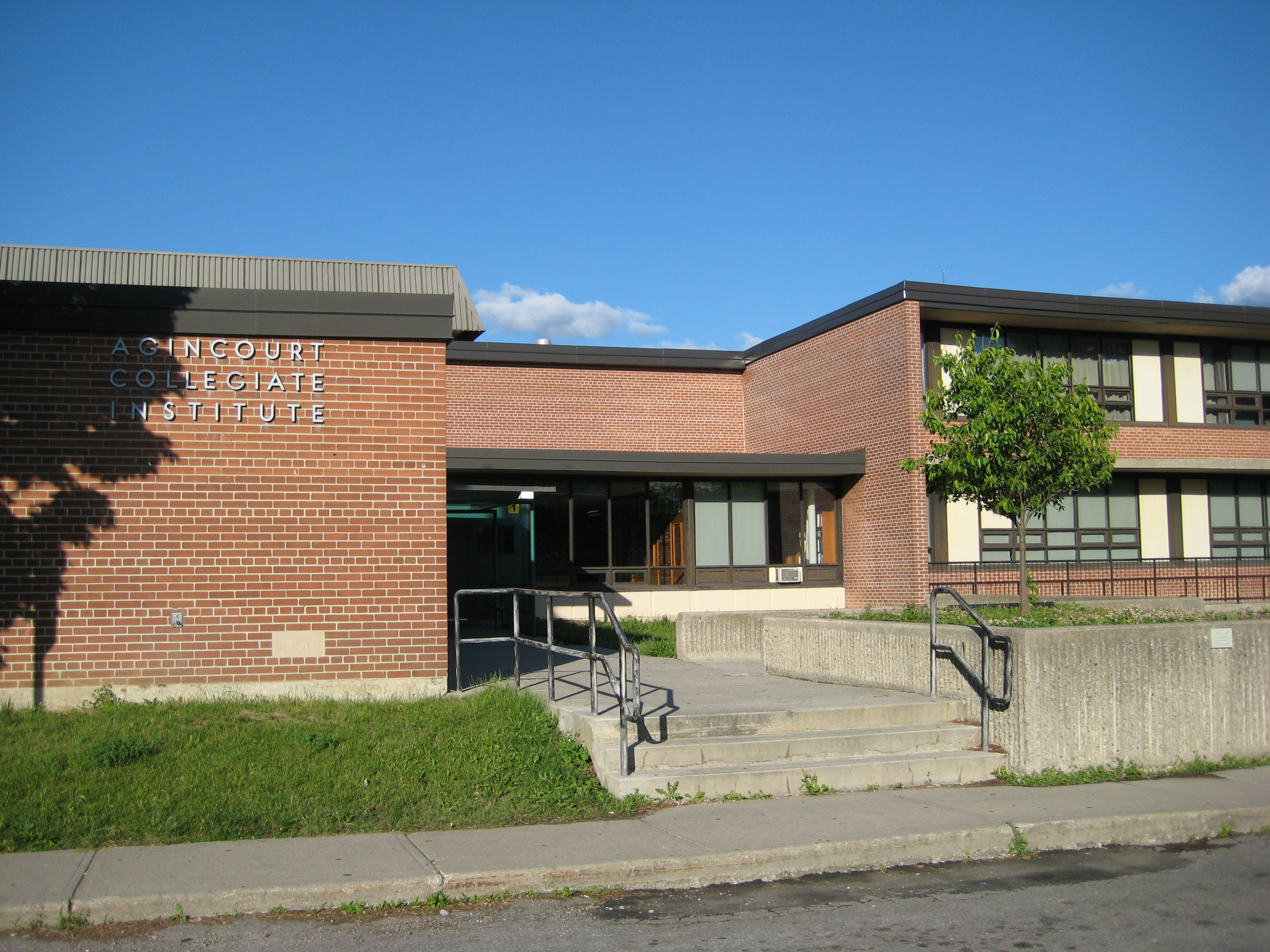
Agincourt Collegiate Institute is a public secondary school located in Agincourt.

Four public school boards operate elementary and secondary schools in Agincourt. They include the public secular Toronto District School Board (TDSB), and the public separate school boards, Conseil scolaire catholique MonAvenir (CSCM), and the Toronto Catholic District School Board (TCDSB). Toronto's French-language secular public school board, Conseil scolaire Viamonde (CSV) now operates a school in the district.

TDSB operates four public secondary schools in the neighbourhood, Agincourt Collegiate Institute, Albert Campbell Collegiate Institute, Sir William Osler High School and Delphi Alternative Secondary School. In addition to secondary schools, TDSB also operates institutions which provide primary education. TCDSB operates two public secondary schools in Agincourt, Francis Libermann Catholic High School and Monsignor Fraser College Midland Campus, with the latter housed in the former Our Lady of Good Counsel Catholic School.

The following public elementary schools operate in Agincourt (with the managing school board in parentheses):

* Agincourt Junior Public School (TDSB)
- C. D. Farquharson Junior Public School (TDSB)
- Chartland Junior Public School (TDSB)
- École elémentaire catholique Saint-Jean-de-Lalande (CSCM)
- École elémentaire Laure-Riese (CSV)
- Henry Kelsey Senior Public School is a middle school located on 1200 Huntingwood Drive. The school was established in 1971 and was named after Henry Kelsey, an English-born Hudson's Bay Company worker who was the first European known to have seen the Canadian Prairies, grizzly bears, great buffalo herds, and many Plains First Nations tribes. As of October 2013, there were 506 students enrolled in the school. Henry Kelsey has Special Education, E.S.L., and LEAP programs as well as a language lab to give added support to students who need it. The school offers programs such as drama, art, vocal music and instrumental music. Furthermore, the school also provides guidance and FSL (French as a second language) programs as mandated by the Ontario Ministry of Education. The two-story building includes over 50 rooms and a large gymnasium that is able to divide into two. The school also includes a relatively big field nearby that is used for recess and gym, but the field is also shared by Chartland Jr P.S. When the school was first built, the second-story was an open-concept, but was later renovated to include walls between the classrooms. This school is served by the special 830 Henry Kelsey-Middlefield school tripper.
- Iroquois Junior Public School (TDSB)
- North Agincourt Junior Public School (TDSB)
- Sir Alexander Mackenzie Senior Public School (TDSB)
- Sir Alexander Mackenzie Senior Public School is a senior middle school founded in 1971, and was named after the explorer Alexander Mackenzie. The school has three French programs. One is the 'French Extended Program,' which has 3 periods of French in place of the English core classes, and vice versa. The students in the 'French Extended Program' learn French, geography and history in French. 'French Immersion Program,' where they learn French, geography in French, history in French, as well as math in French. Lastly, in the 'Core Program,' which is the normal program, there are 3 periods of English classes and one French class.
- St. Bartholomew Catholic School (TCDSB)
- St. Elizabeth Seton Catholic Elementary School (TCDSB)
- St. Ignatius of Loyola Catholic School (TCDSB)
- White Haven Junior Public School (TDSB)

== Recreation ==
The neighbourhood is home to a number of municipal parks, managed by the Toronto Parks, Forestry and Recreation Division. In addition to local parks, the Division also operates the Agincourt Recreation Centre (pool and ice rink – damaged in fire in January 2019), located adjacent to Agincourt Park, Albert Campbell Pool (inside Albert Campbell CI) and Commander Park Arena (ice rink) at Commander Park.

- Agincourt Park
- Alexmuir Park
- Brimley Woods Park
- Chartland Park
- Chartwell Park
- Collingwood Park
- Donalda Park
- Farquharson Park
- Havendale Park
- Iroquois Park
- Knott Park
- Metrogate Park
- McDairmid Woods Park
- North Agincourt Park
- Snowhill Park
- White Haven Park

== See also ==
- J. K. L. Ross, operator of Agincourt Farms, a thoroughbred farm once located in Agincourt
