= Charles R. Sanderson =

Canadian librarian

- Born: 1887
- Died: 1956 (aged 68–69)
- Occupation: Librarian
- Years active: 1937-1956

Charles R. Sanderson (1887–1956) was a Canadian librarian. He was chief librarian of the Toronto Public Library from 1937 to 1956, following George Locke. The Charles R. Sanderson Memorial Branch of the Toronto Public Library, which opened in 1968 in Alexandra Park, is named after him.

Sanderson began his career in England where he was on the staff of the John Rylands Library in Manchester; in 1941 he contributed an article about Lord Sydenham to the Bulletin of the library.
