= List of north–south roads in Toronto =

The following is a list of the north–south expressways and arterial thoroughfares in the city of Toronto, Ontario, Canada. The city is organized in a grid pattern dating back to the plan laid out by Augustus Jones between 1793 and 1797. Most streets are aligned in the north–south or east–west direction, based on the shoreline of Lake Ontario. In other words, major north–south roads are generally perpendicular to the Lake Ontario shoreline and major east–west roads are generally parallel to the lake's shoreline. The Toronto road system is also influenced by its topography as some roads are aligned with the old Lake Iroquois shoreline, or the deep valleys.

== Expressways ==
=== Allen Road ===
William R. Allen Road
- Location: Eglinton Avenue – Kennard Avenue (Continues north as Dufferin Street)

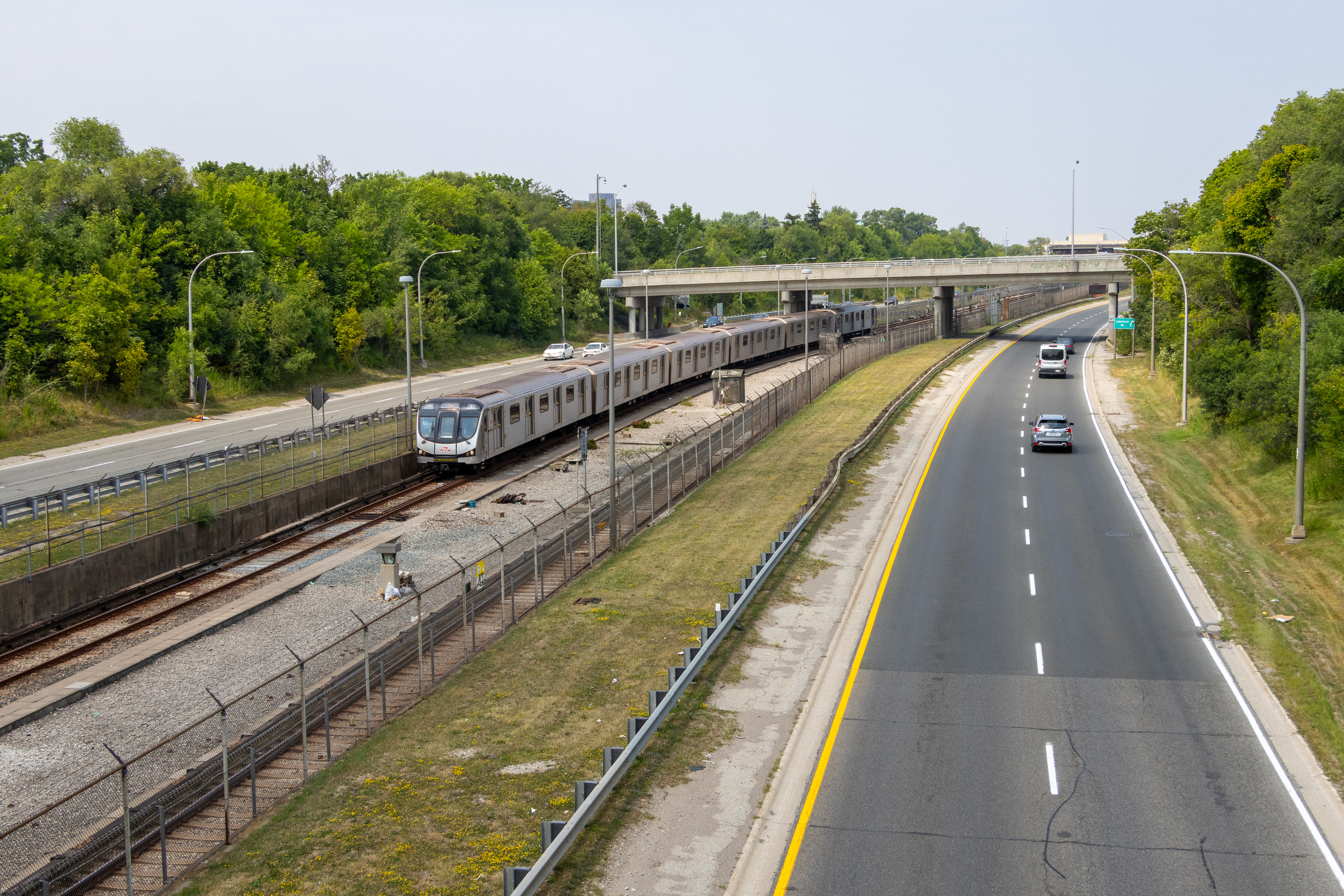
Allen Road as viewed northwards from Glencairn Avenue at Glencairn station

William R. Allen Road, known more commonly as Allen Road, the Allen Expressway and The Allen, is a short expressway that travels from Eglinton Avenue West in the south to Kennard Avenue in the north. The portion south of Sheppard Avenue is the completed section of the proposed Spadina Expressway. Allen Road is named after Metro Toronto Chairman William R. Allen and maintained by the City of Toronto. Landmarks along the road include the Lawrence Allen Centre (formerly Lawrence Square Shopping Centre), Yorkdale Shopping Centre and Downsview Park (formerly CFB Downsview).

Line 1 Yonge–University runs along the median of much of Allen Road's length.

=== Don Valley Parkway ===
Don Valley Parkway
- Location: Gardiner Expressway – Highway 401 (continues north as Ontario Highway 404)
- Length: 15.0 km (9.3 mi)

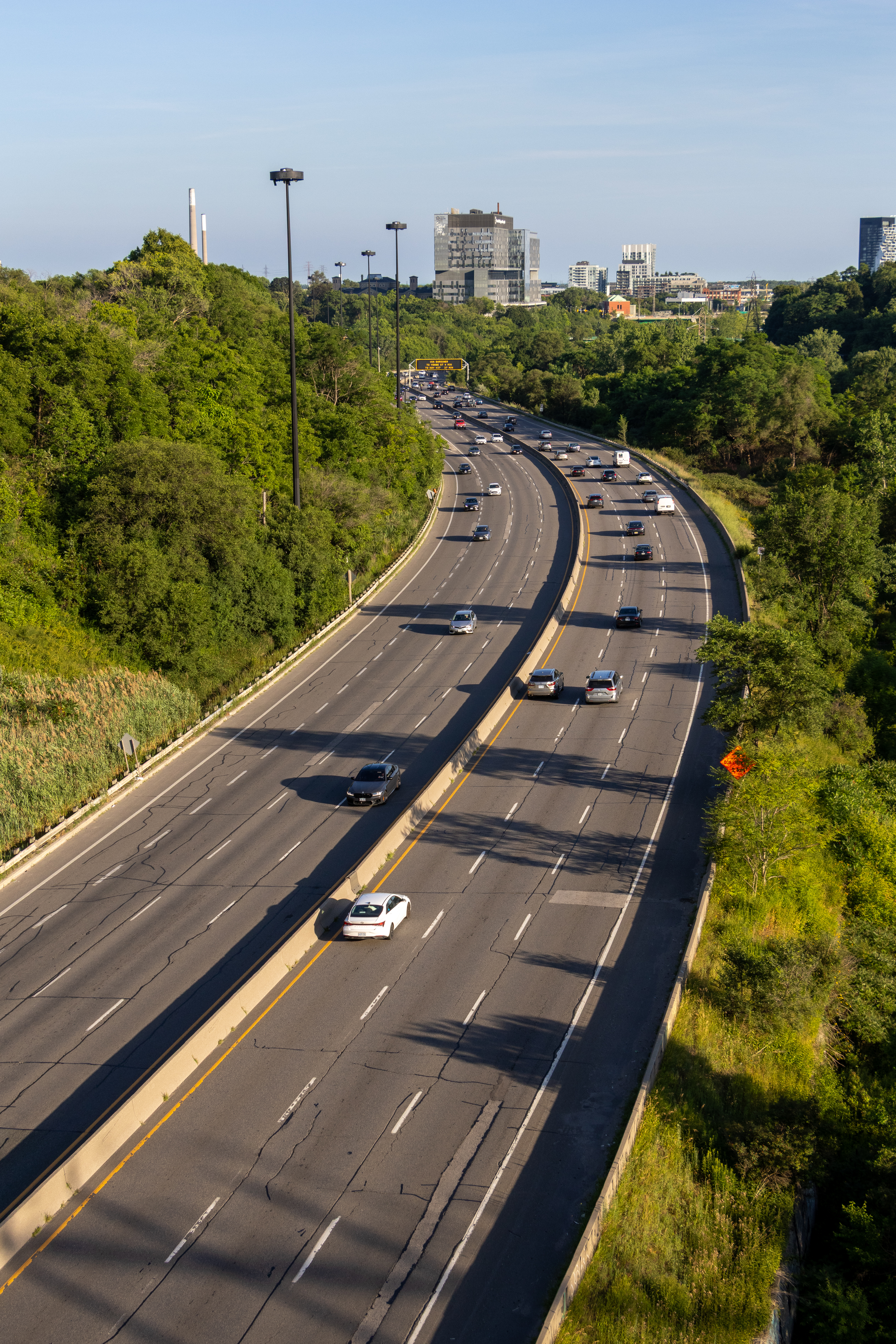
The Don Valley Parkway in summer, facing southwest from the Prince Edward Viaduct

The Don Valley Parkway (DVP) is a controlled-access six-lane expressway in Toronto connecting the Gardiner Expressway in downtown Toronto with Highway 401. North of Highway 401, the expressway continues as Highway 404 to Newmarket. The parkway runs through the parklands of the Don River valley, after which it is named. It is patrolled by the Toronto Police Service, has a maximum speed limit of 90 km/h (56 mph) and is 15.0 km (9.3 mi) in length.

The parkway was the second expressway to be built by Metropolitan Toronto (Metro). Planning for it began in 1954, the year of Metro's formation; the first section opened in 1961 and the entire route was completed by the end of 1966. South of Bloor Street, the expressway was constructed over existing roadways. North of Bloor Street, the expressway was built on a new alignment through the valley, requiring the removal of several hills, the rerouting of the Don River and the clearing of green space. North of Eglinton Avenue, the expressway follows the former Woodbine Avenue right-of-way north to Highway 401.

The parkway operates well beyond its intended capacity of 60,000 vehicles per day and is known for its daily traffic jams; some sections carry an average of 100,000 vehicles a day. Planned as part of a larger expressway network within Toronto, it was one of the few expressways built before the public opposition that cancelled many of the others.

=== Highway 404 ===
Highway 404
- Location: Highway 401 – Steeles Avenue East (continues north into Markham) (continues south as Don Valley Parkway)

King's Highway 404 is a provincially maintained extension to the Don Valley Parkway, north of the junction with Highway 401. Highway 404 was opened from Sheppard Avenue East to Steeles Avenue East in 1979 and extended north of the Metro Toronto limits shortly thereafter, first to Davis Drive in Newmarket and eventually to Woodbine Avenue just south of Ravenshoe Road in East Gwillimbury.

=== Highway 427 ===
Highway 427
- Location: Browns Line – Steeles Avenue (continues south as Brown's Line) (continues north into Vaughan)

Most of King's Highway 427 travels within Toronto from Browns Line to Steeles Avenue, but it has been extended beyond current city limits to Major Mackenzie Drive. It was initially constructed to Highway 401 from 1953 to 1956 as the Toronto Bypass, then extended to Pearson Airport as the Airport Expressway from 1964 to 1971, and finally designated as Highway 427 in 1972. The section to Steeles Avenue West was completed in 1984.

== Arterial roads ==
=== Avenue Road ===
Avenue Road
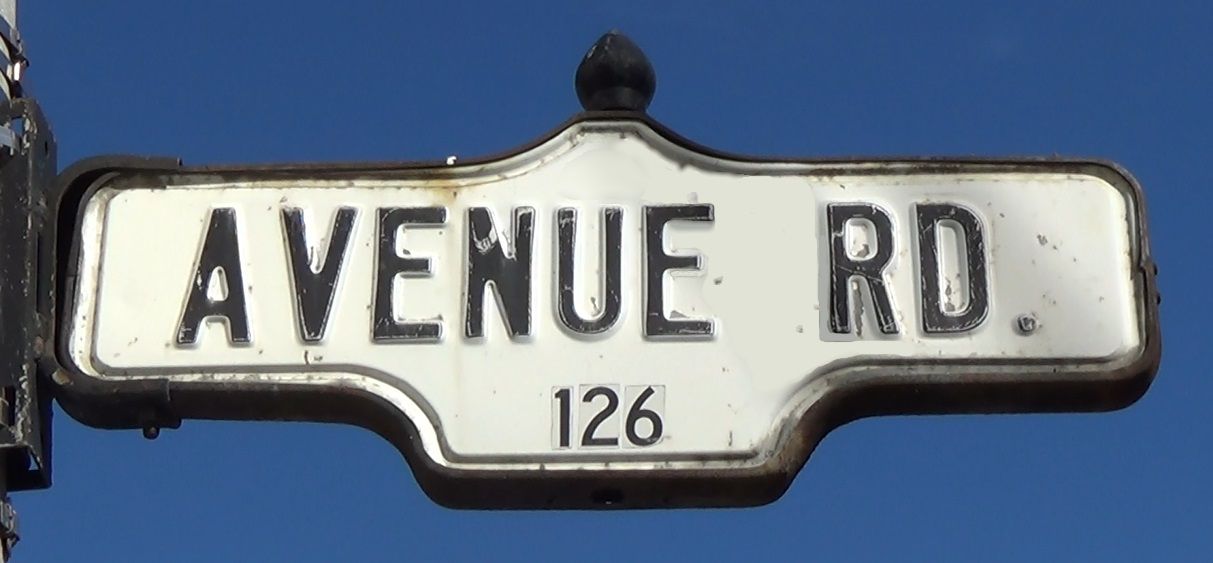
- Location: Bloor Street – Bombay Avenue (just north of Hwy 401) (continues south as Queen's Park Crescent)

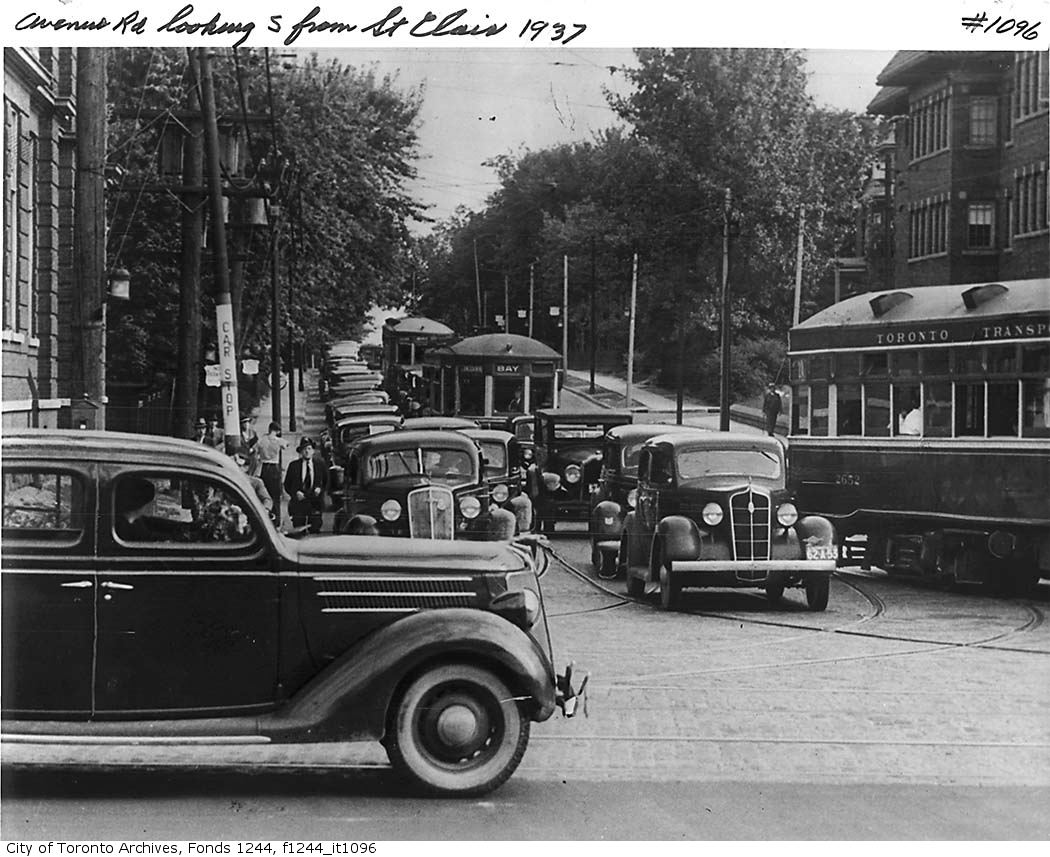
Looking south on Avenue Road from St. Clair Avenue, 1937

There are several stories relating to the origin of Avenue Road. The most popular legend retells that of an early surveying team travelling west along what is now Bloor Street. Upon reaching the location of the intersection with Avenue Road today, the lead surveyor, a Scotsman, pointed north and proclaimed "Let's 'ave a new road here". But this is almost certainly apocryphal; the street was probably named for its tree-lined character. It is a part of the decommissioned Ontario Highway 11A.

Avenue Road is also a short residential street (1.5 km or 0.93 mi) that runs from Edgar Avenue north to Weldrick Road connecting the communities of Richvale and Yongehurst in Richmond Hill, Ontario. Although the Toronto section can align with the Richmond Hill sections if connected, the latter is a newer street not officially part of the historic Toronto roadway, unlike the disconnected York Region portions of its counterparts Kipling Avenue, Leslie Street and Woodbine Avenue.

=== Bathurst Street ===
Bathurst Street
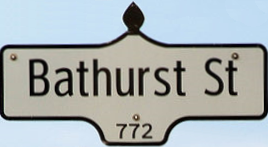
- Location: Queens Quay West – Steeles Avenue West (continues north into Vaughan)

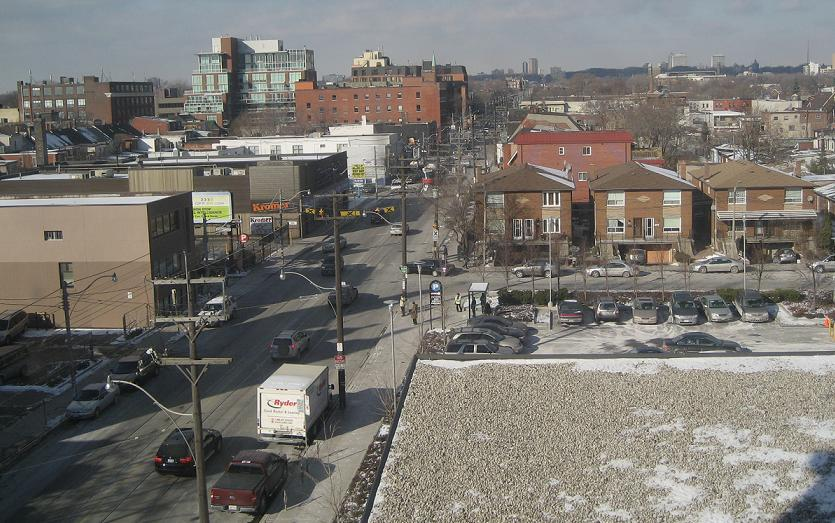
Northward view of Bathurst Street from Toronto Western Hospital in 2008

Bathurst Street is named after Henry Bathurst, 3rd Earl Bathurst, who was British Secretary of War during the reign of George IV. Henry's contributions to Toronto include organizing the successive waves of British settlers following the War of 1812, and granting the charter to the first university in the city, King's College. Bathurst Street originally only referred to the section south of Queen Street. In 1870, the section north of Queen Street became part of Bathurst Street. It was known until then as Crookshank's Lane, after Honourable George Crookshank. The road acted as a driveway to his 300-acre (1.2 km^{2}) farm.

=== Bay Street ===
Bay Street
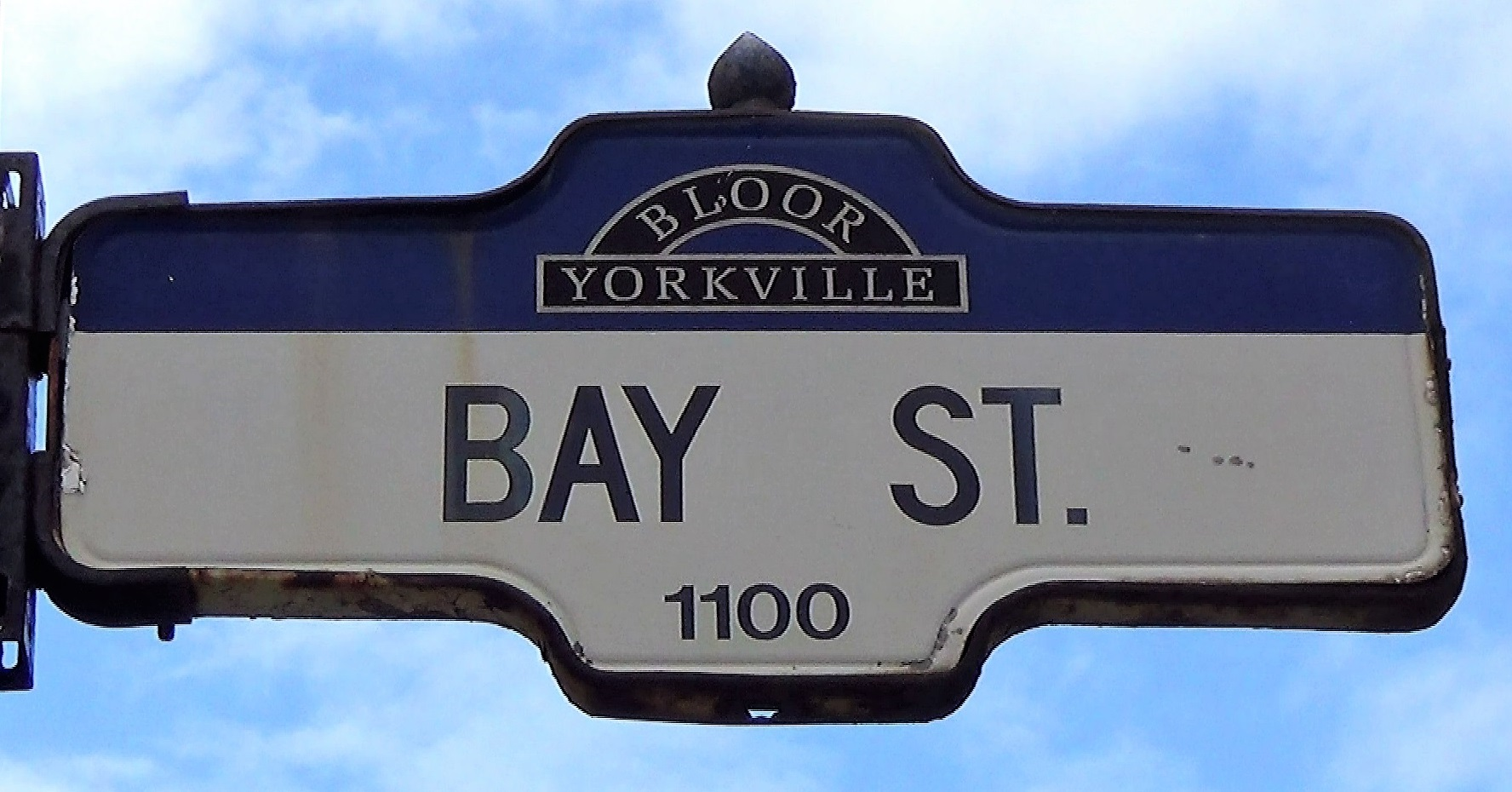
- Location: Queen's Quay – Davenport Road (continues north as Davenport Road)

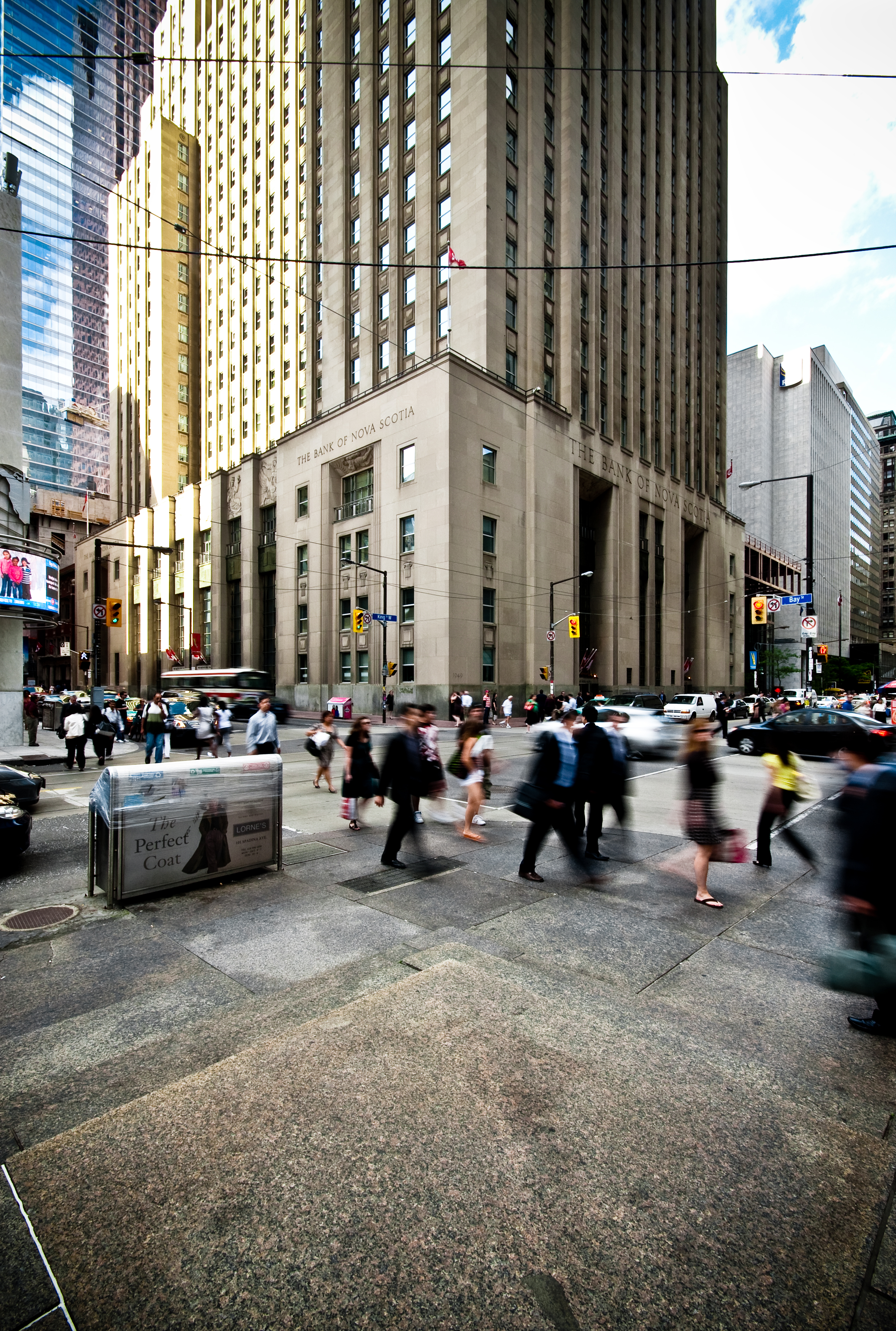
As seen in 2009, the intersection of Bay Street and King Street is considered the heart of Canada's economy.

Bay Street, formerly known as Bear Street, is supposedly a reference to a "noted chase given to a bear" by settlers in that area. It is the centre of Toronto's Financial District and is often used as a metonym to refer to Canada's financial industry, similar to New York City's Wall Street in the United States. Within the legal profession, the term Bay Street is also used colloquially to refer to the large, full-service business law firms of Toronto, particularly the top-tier law firms known as the Seven Sisters. The street was officially named when the land it occupies was annexed by the first expansion of York. Bay travelled from Lake Ontario to Lot Street, now Queen Street. North of Queen Street and travelling to College Street was Teraulay Street. Several disconnected side streets existed north of there to Davenport Road. In 1922, By-Law 9316 joined these streets together as far north as Scollard Street. By-Law 9884, enacted on January 28, 1924, changed the name of Ketchum Avenue to Bay Street, officially extending it to Davenport Road. The bend in Bay Street south of Old City Hall reflects this history, serving as a terminating vista.

=== Bayview Avenue ===
Bayview Avenue
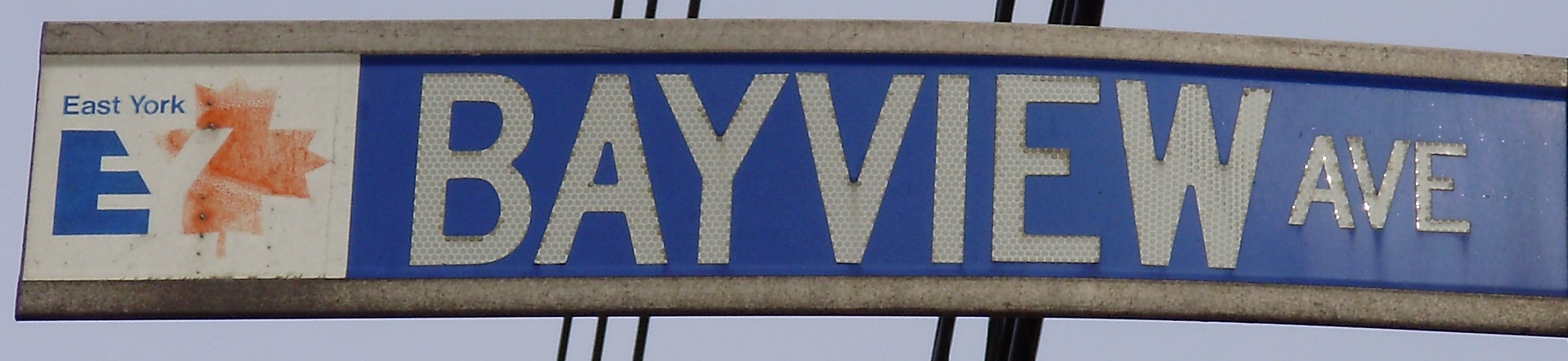
- Location: South of Eastern Avenue – Steeles Avenue East (continues west as Mill Street and north into Markham)

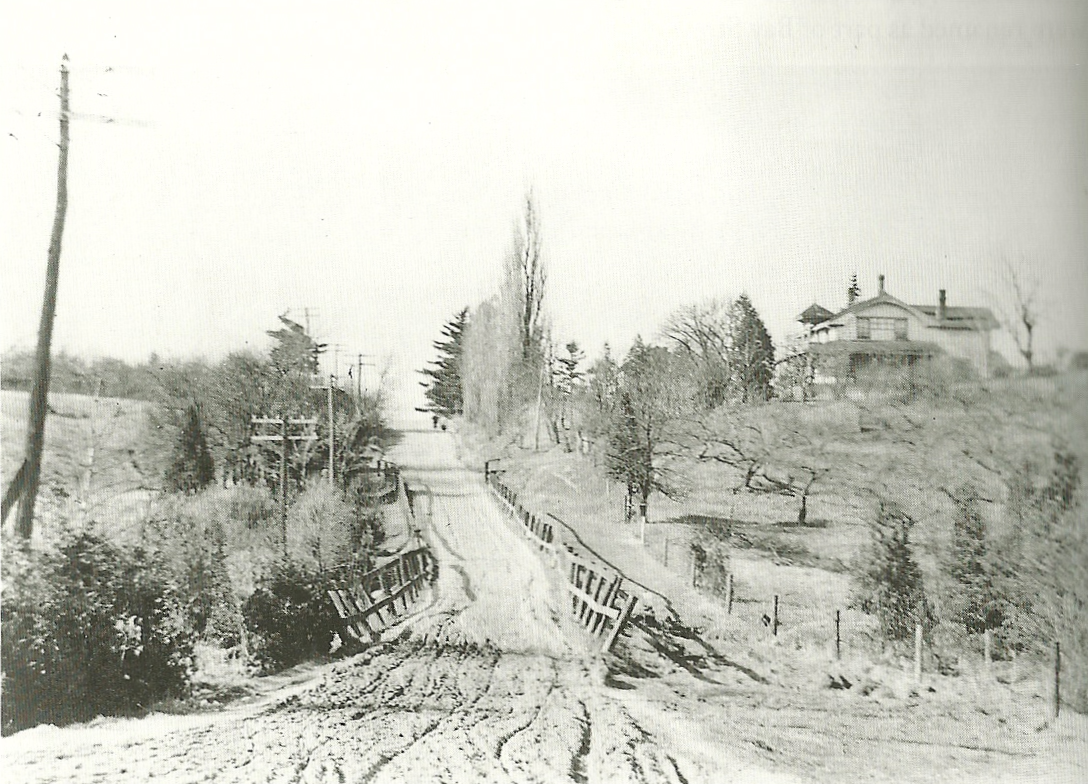
Looking north along Bayview Avenue from Eglinton Avenue in 1910

Bayview Avenue, formerly East York Avenue, was named in 1930 after the estate of Dr. James Stanley McLean, Bay View. The McLean House forms a part of the Sunnybrook Health Sciences Centre today. Several notable estates were built along Bayview Avenue in the early 20th century, many of which still exist since converted to a variety of public uses.

=== Beare Road ===
Beare Road
- Location: Finch Avenue East – Steeles Avenue East (continues east as Finch Avenue East)

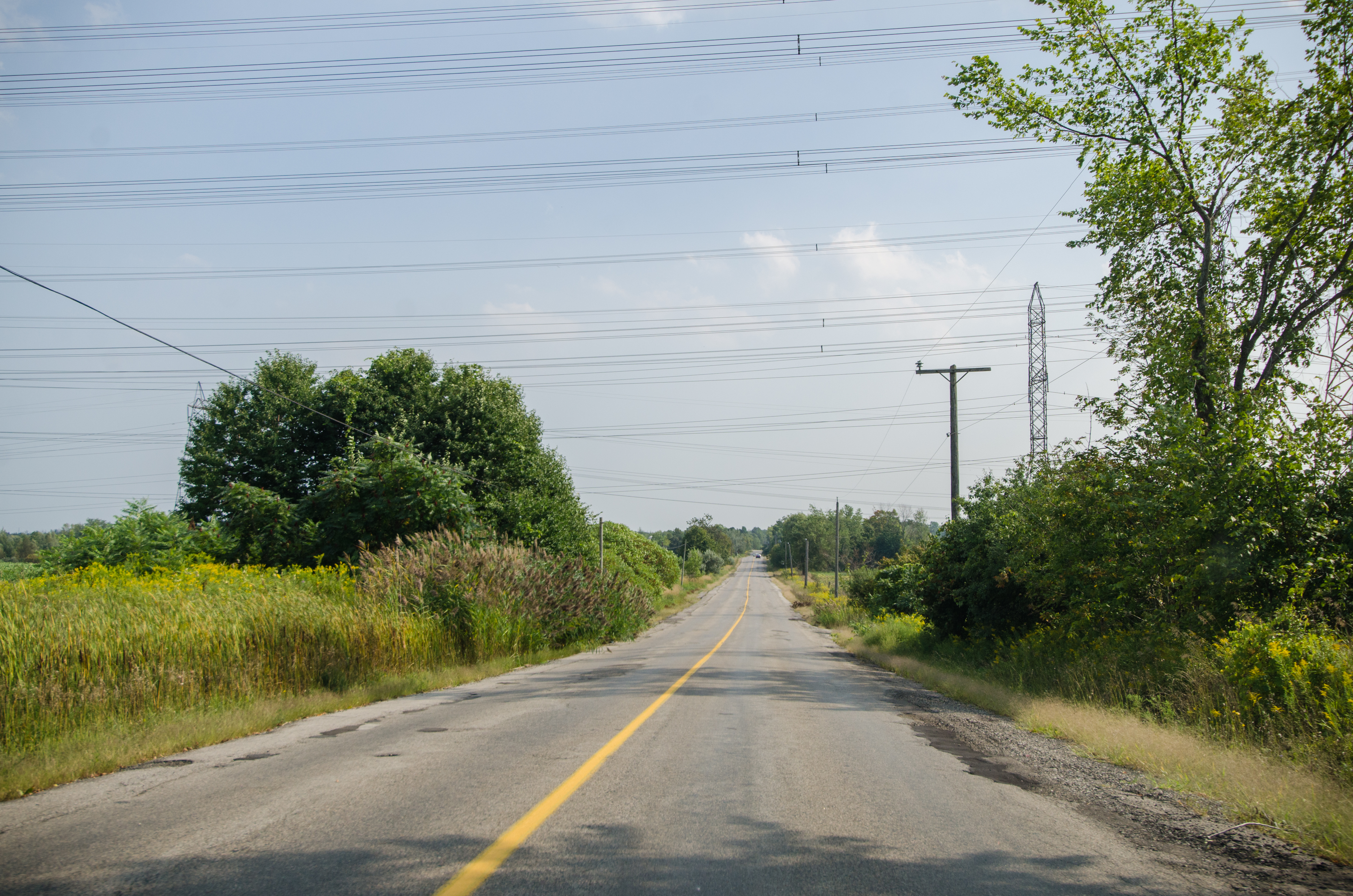
Beare Road

Beare Road is named for the Beare family, who were prominent farmers in the Hillside community of northeastern Scarborough.

=== Bellamy Road ===
Bellamy Road
- Location: Kingston Road – Progress Avenue (continues north as Corporate Drive) (continues south as Ravine Drive)

Bellamy Road, formerly Secord Road, is named for American author Edward Bellamy, who wrote Looking Backwards 2000–1887, about a utopian society. Settlers approached Scarborough Township for a parcel of land to start their own utopia. Although the request was not granted, the road along which they sought to establish their society came to be known as Bellamy Road. The CN grade separation on Eglinton Avenue, built in the early 1960s, split Bellamy Road into two unconnected sections. Consequently, the township of Scarborough renamed the sections as North and South on May 29, 1964.

Bellamy Road South begins at Kingston Road and proceeds north to just short of Eglinton Avenue. It is entirely a minor residential street. Bellamy Road North resumes opposite the southern section, just north of the CN tracks and Eglinton GO Station of the Lakeshore East Line. The northern portion of the road becomes Corporate Drive at Progress Avenue, proceeding towards the Scarborough Town Centre; while its southern portion becomes Ravine Drive at Kingston Road. Most of the northern section is residential, though the section between Ellesmere Road and Progress Avenue consists solely of multi-unit warehousing, many of which have been converted into places of worship for various faiths.

=== Beverley Street ===
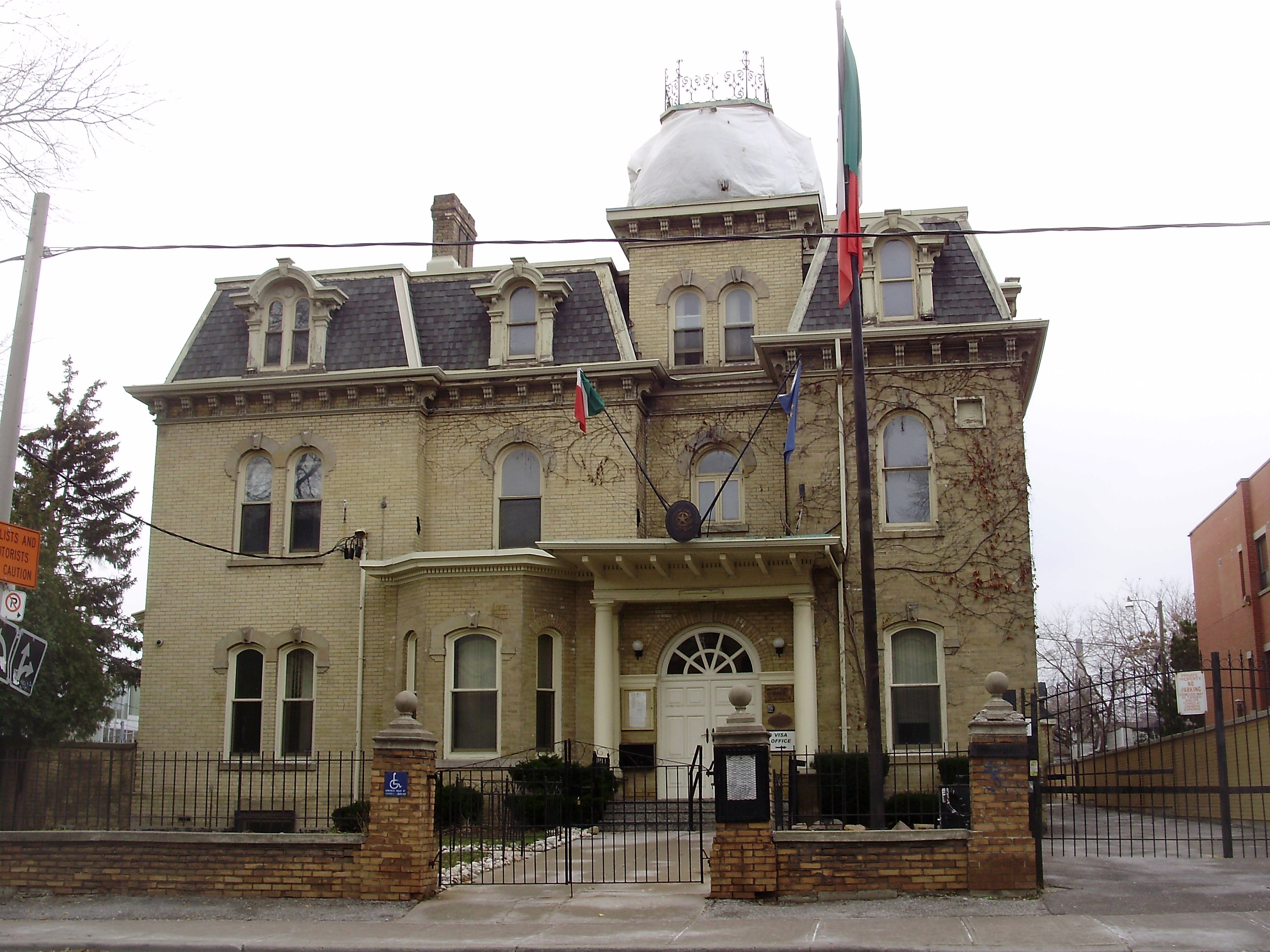
The Italian Consulate on Beverley Street in Chinatown

Beverley Street
- Location: Queen Street West – College Street (continues north as St. George St.)

Beverley Street is a southern continuation of St. George Street, located a few metres east of it. It passes by the Art Gallery of Ontario and the Italian Consulate in Chinatown.

=== Birchmount Road ===
Birchmount Road
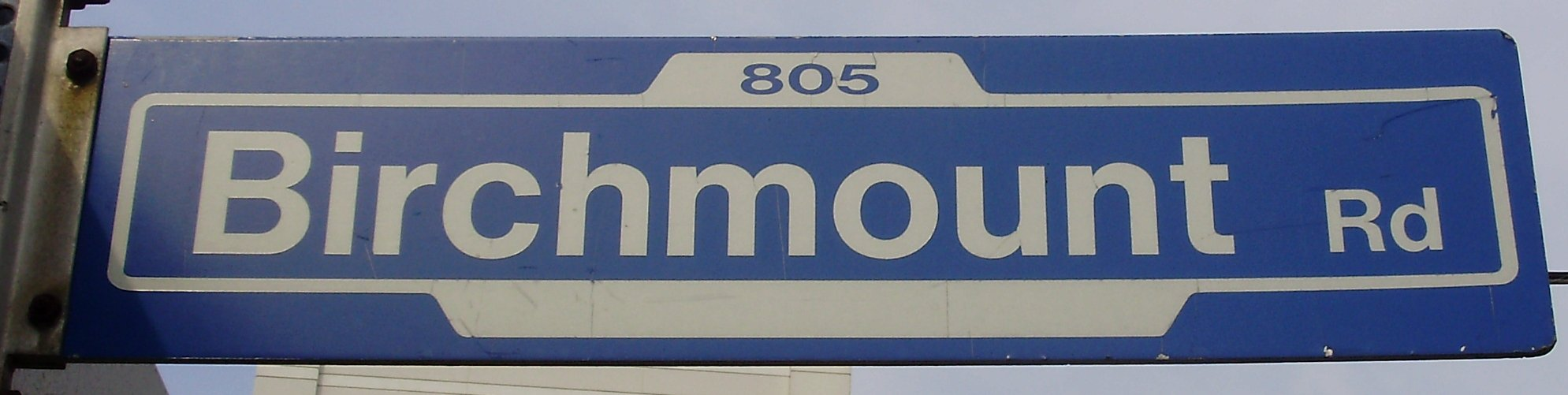
- Location: Lake Ontario – Steeles Avenue East (continues north into Markham)

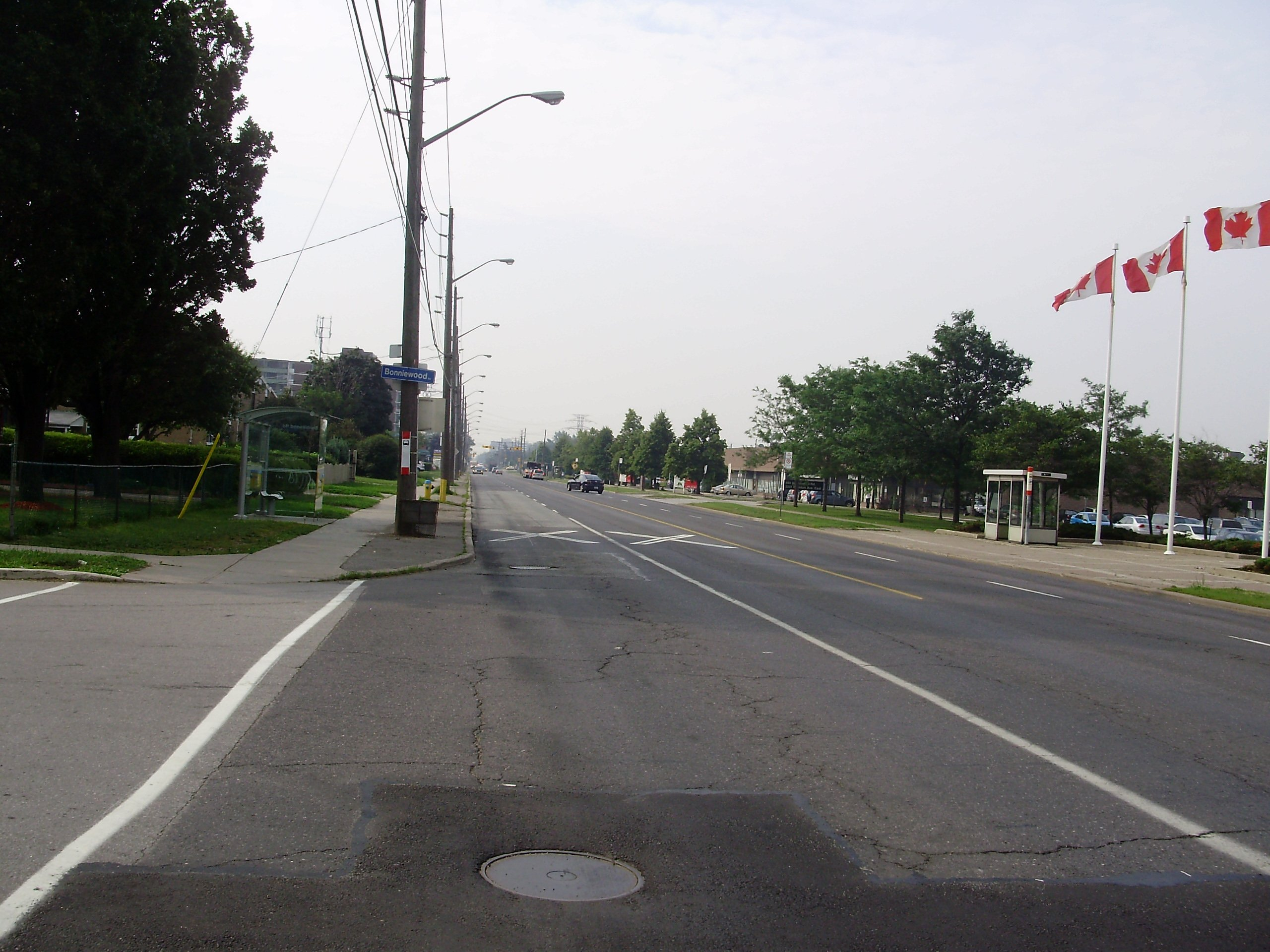
Residential and office development on Birchmount Road south of Eglinton Avenue in 2008

Birchmount Road began as a concession line laid out by the surveyors of Upper Canada. For a long time, it remained a rural and little-used route. In the 1920s, it was little more than a dirt path.

The southern part of Birchmount Road was one of the first parts of Toronto to see suburban development. This development was in the years immediately before and after the Second World War and was thus not reflective of the car-centred design of much of Scarborough. Birchmount is notable for being the terminus of the only TTC streetcar route ever to travel into Scarborough, though Line 5 Eglinton operates in Scarborough. The Birchmount Loop was for several decades the turning loop for the Kingston Road streetcar. The first lines in the region were built by the Toronto and Scarboro' Electric Railway, Light and Power Company. They were taken over by the TTC, which ran streetcars to Birchmount Loop until 1954. The loop remained in place until 1985, when a condominium was built on the site.

By the 1960s, Birchmount Road had been transformed into its current role as one of the main arterial roads for Scarborough.

Beyond Toronto in Markham, Birchmount Road continues firstly as a residential street to Denison Street, then from Denison Street to Highway 407, it cuts through commercial business parks. In 2011, the road was extended past Highway 407 to north of Enterprise Boulevard to serve as the main street of the new Downtown Markham, a planned new central downtown core to replace that city's historic, but now nodal, Markham Village. A bridge crossing the Rouge River was built to complete the road between Enterprise Boulevard and Highway 7 to tie into Village Parkway.

=== Black Creek Drive ===
Black Creek Drive
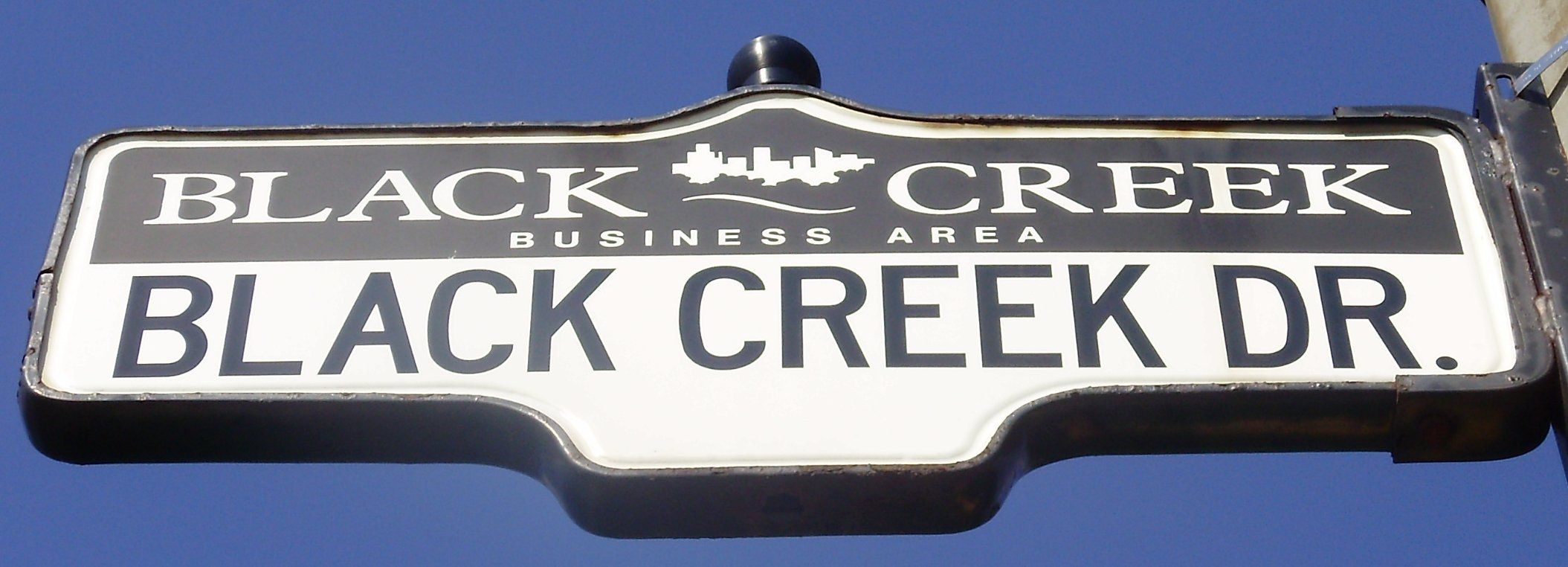
- Location: Weston Road – Jane Street (continues north as Ontario Highway 400)

Black Creek Drive was originally constructed as a southward extension of Highway 400. However, it was built as an arterial road instead, due to the opposition to extending the Spadina Expressway south of Eglinton Avenue, which in turn led to the cancellation of other expressway extensions in Toronto. The street has few intersections at Lawrence Avenue, Trethewey Drive, Todd Baylis Boulevard, Eglinton Avenue and it ends at Weston Road. The street is not served by any TTC routes. The road is named for the nearby waterway of Black Creek.

=== Brimley Road ===
Brimley Road
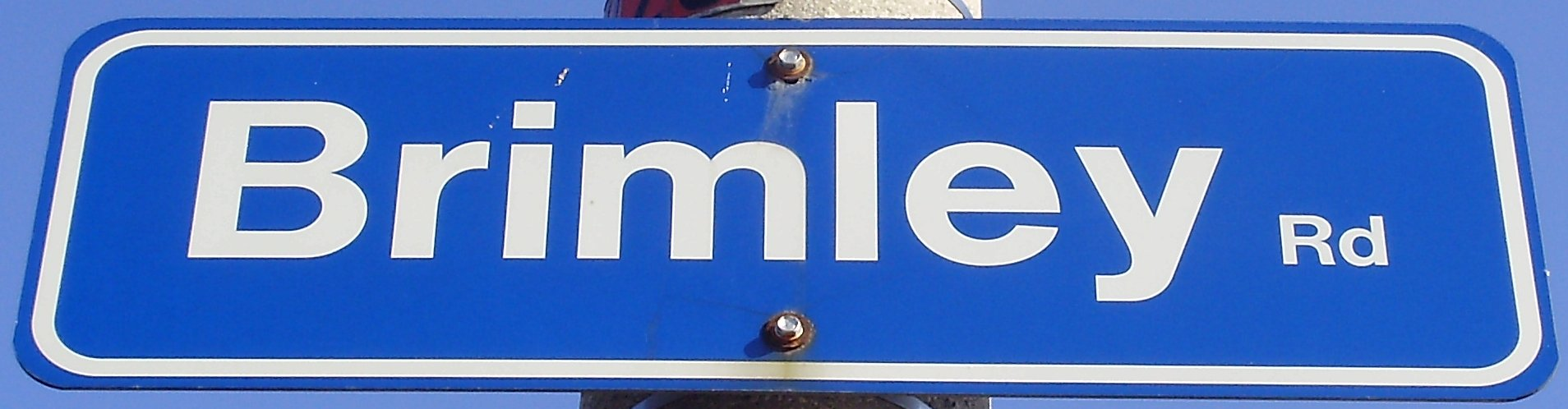
- Location: Bluffer's Park – Steeles Avenue East (continues north into Markham)

Brimley Road is of unknown origin. Beginning at Bluffer's Park at the foot of the Scarborough Bluffs, Brimley Road runs through Scarborough, past Steeles Avenue and ends at 14th Avenue in Markham. The Scarborough portion is mainly residential with small strip plazas interspersed along the route. North of Finch Avenue is Brimley Forest, a small patch of unaltered land. North of Steeles Avenue, Brimley Road weaves through the residential areas of the Milliken community of Markham, then ends at 14th Avenue and becomes Beckenridge Drive, which is a residential road.

The section south of Sheppard Avenue was once interrupted at Highway 401 but was a through road prior to the mid-1950s. An $11 million overpass and partial interchange of the freeway was built and opened on October 18, 1987, over the objections of many area residents concerned with increased traffic volume. In an attempt to address these concerns, it was initially restricted to transit buses and emergency vehicles. After widely reported public pressure, Scarborough City Council voted February 18, 1988 to open the overpass to general traffic. Proposals to modify the interchange are currently being examined as part of a larger analysis of Highway 401 through Scarborough.

=== Broadview Avenue ===
Broadview Avenue
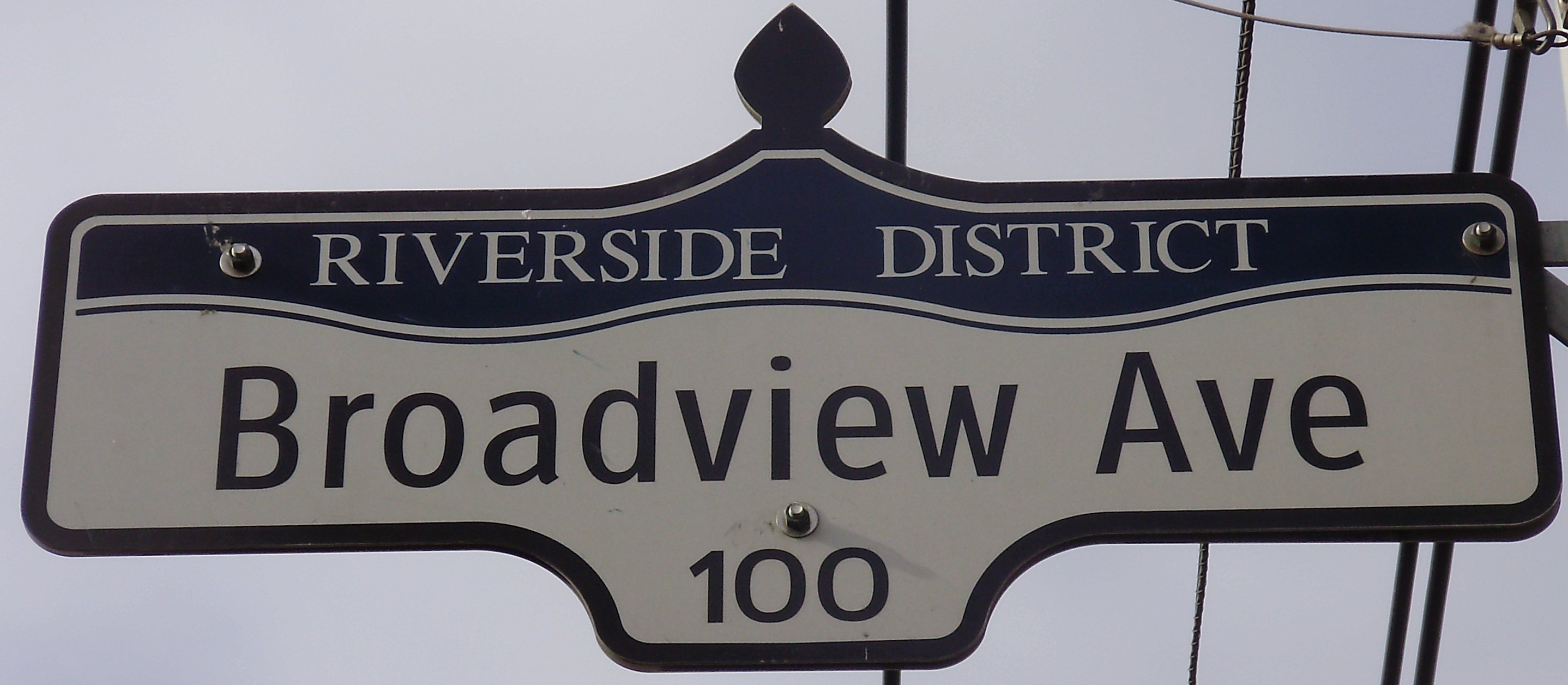
- Location: Sunlight Park Road – Fernwood Gardens (continues east as O'Connor Drive)

Broadview Avenue, known as the Mill Road or Don Mills Road (south of Queen Street to Ashbridge's Bay marsh was Scadding Street) until 1884, was constructed in 1798 by Timothy Skinner, owner of several mills in Todmorden. The name is a reference to the broad view from the crest overlooking Riverdale Park. When the section south of Queen Street became Broadview Avenue, the street to west was renamed from Smith Street to Scadding Street. The northern end at city limits was a toll booth next to the then-northern section of Winchester Street. The road was extended in 1913 and 1922 by absorbing parts of Don Mills Road as far north as O'Connor Drive. By 1912, sections south of Eastern Avenue were lost when Lever Brothers expanded their soap factory. There are plans to restore those sections as part of the city's waterfront revitalization projects.

In Toronto's East Chinatown, there are two signs at Gerrard Street East with the Cantonese name of the street "百樂匯街" (Jyutping: baak3 lok6 wui6 gaai1).

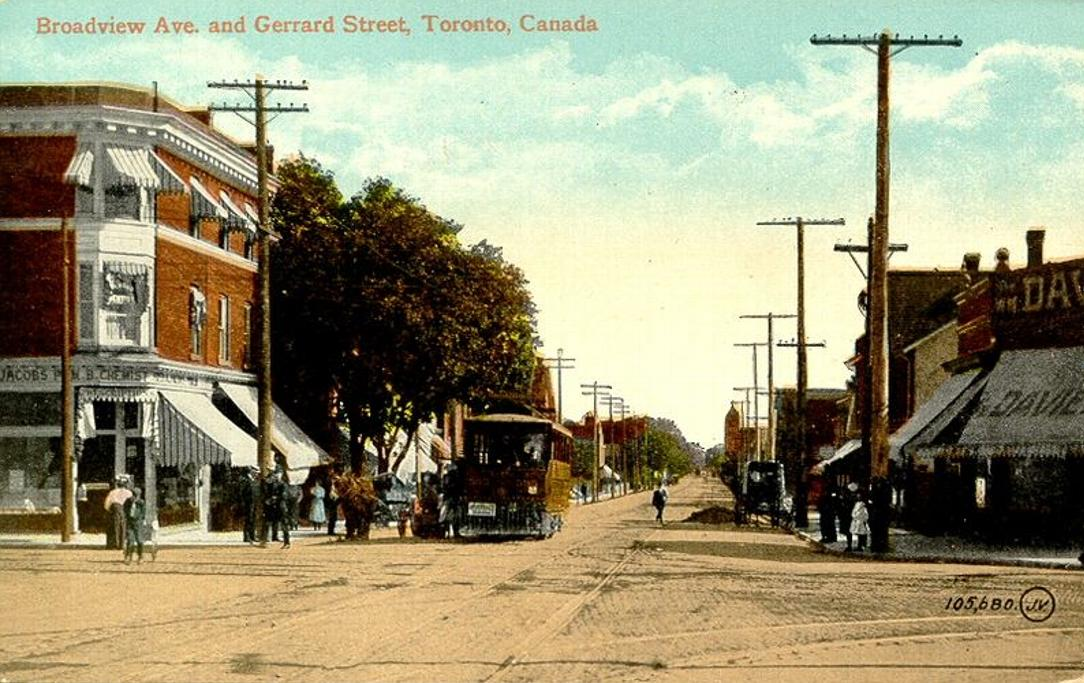
Broadview Avenue and Gerrard Street, 1910

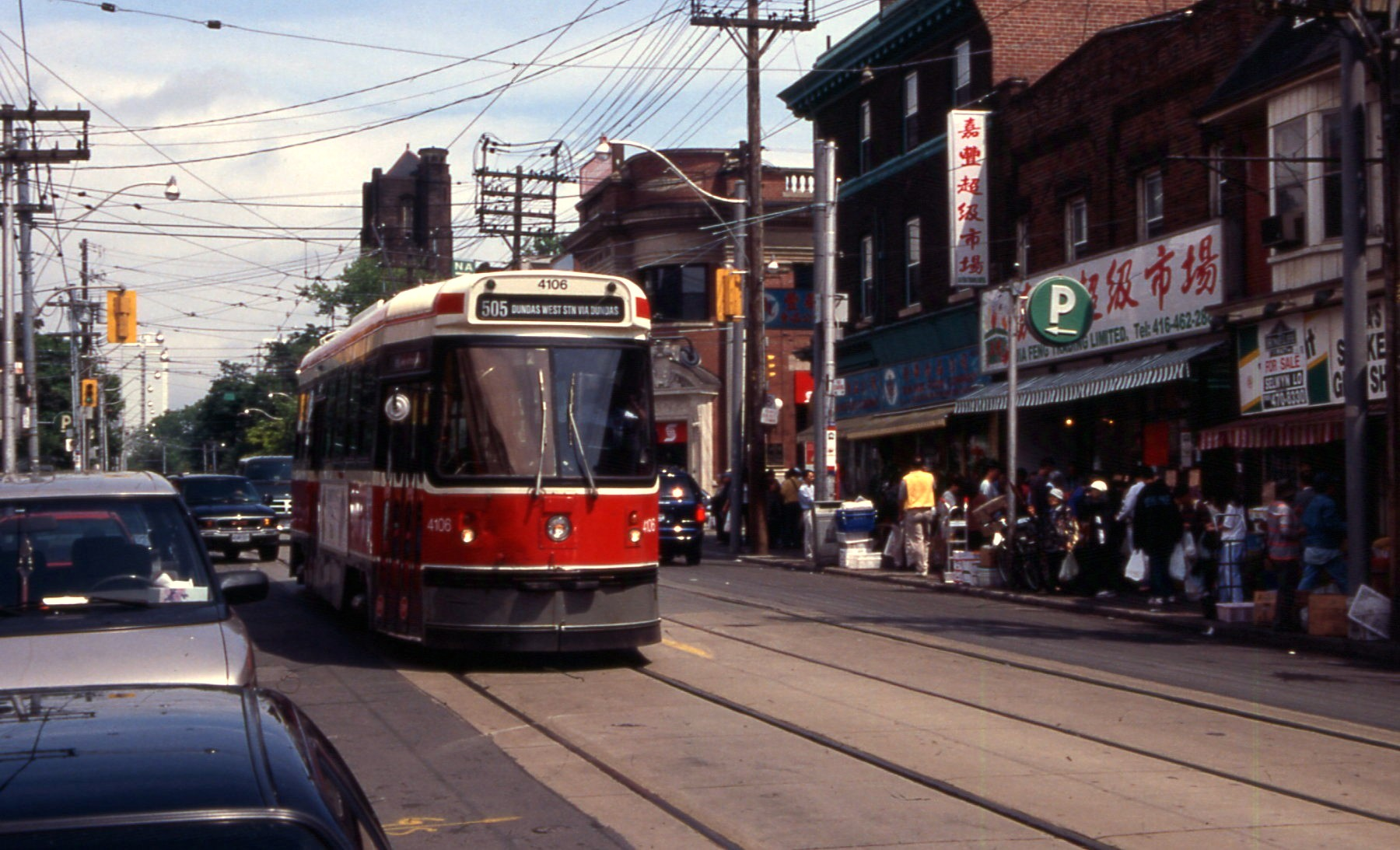
Broadview Avenue looking north towards Gerrard, 2002

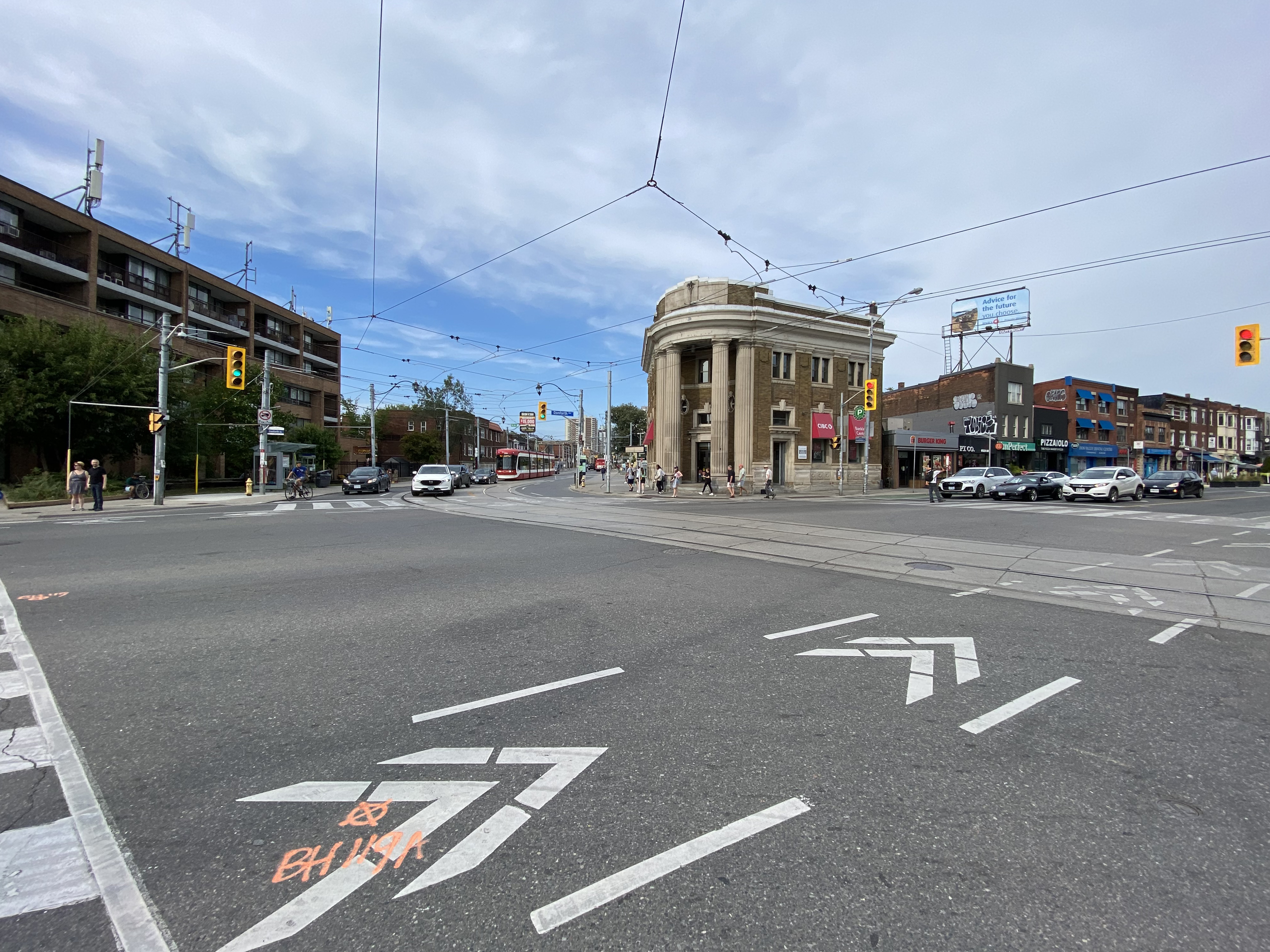
Looking south on Broadview Avenue from Danforth Avenue in 2022

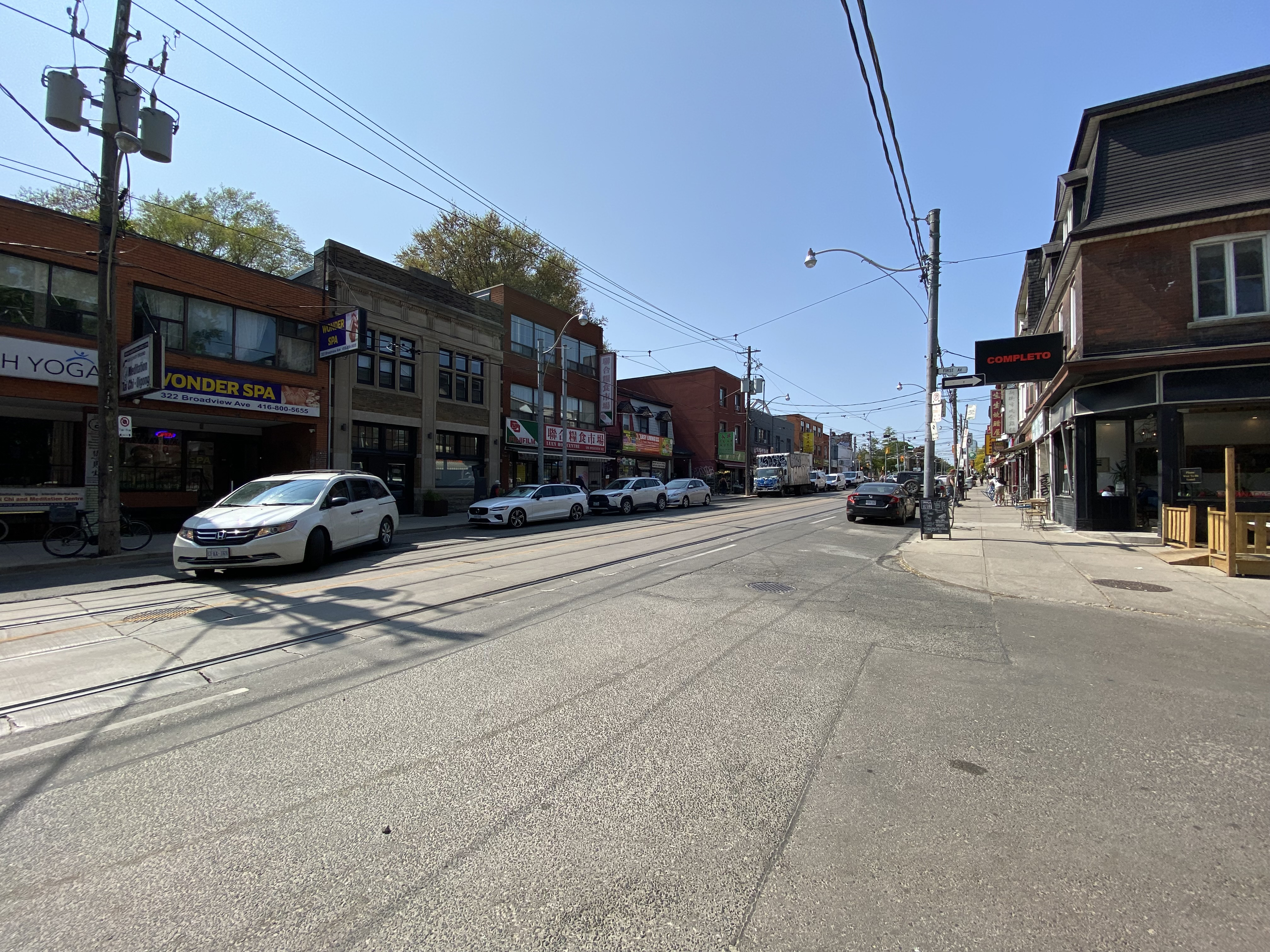
Toronto's East Chinatown in 2023

=== Brown's Line ===
Brown's Line
- Location: Lake Shore Boulevard – Evans Avenue (continues north as Highway 427)

Brown's Line was once the name by which the trail running north from Lake Ontario to Highway 9 was known. It originated as a trail, which had been blazed to define the western boundary of the 1805 Toronto Purchase and was part of Colonel Samuel Smith's Tract. The trail was eventually referred to as "Brown's Line" as the northern terminus was a small town, now known as Schomberg, but originally called Brownsville. Since the hamlet's main inhabitant was known by the surname of Brown (Yorkshire-born Joseph and Mary Brown came to the area in 1831 and acquired a 100 arces at Lot 11 Concession 3) it seemed logical that the road which transported persons to Brown's Town should be referred to as Brown's Line. There was, however, another Brownsville just south of Ingersoll, Ontario, also named for the family in that town. Since there was obviously confusion in the mail system, the logic required a name change, and Schomberg was created likely for Meinhardt Schomberg, 3rd Duke of Schomberg, a general under King William III of England. Before the construction of Highway 427, Brown's Line was part of Highway 27. Today, Brown's Line is the short southernmost stretch of the former highway, which was rebuilt into Highway 427 from the Queen Elizabeth Way to Highway 401, north of which a short section still exists, before becoming simply an arterial road unofficially named Highway 27 through to Steeles Avenue, and then continues as two regional/county roads numbered 27 past Highway 9, running to Barrie.

=== Caledonia Road ===
Caledonia Road
- Location: Bridgeland Avenue – St. Clair Avenue West (Continues south as Caledonia Park Road to Davenport Avenue)

Caledonia Road is a minor arterial road that is primarily residential south of Eglinton Avenue and between Glencairn Avenue and Lawrence Avenue, but primarily industrial between Eglinton Avenue and Glencairn Avenue and north of Lawrence Avenue. Caledonia Road has very steep valleys between Rogers Road and Eglinton Avenue. It is served by Caledonia station of both Line 5 Eglinton and GO Transit's Barrie line since February 2026.

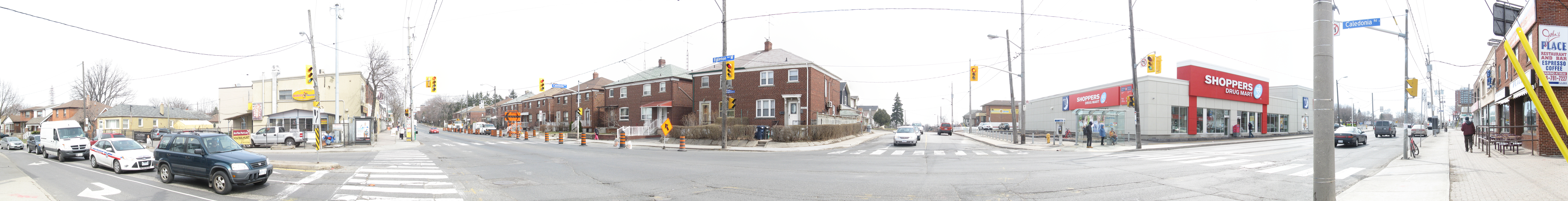
Panorama of Caledonia Road at Eglinton Avenue

=== Carlingview Drive ===
Carlingview Drive
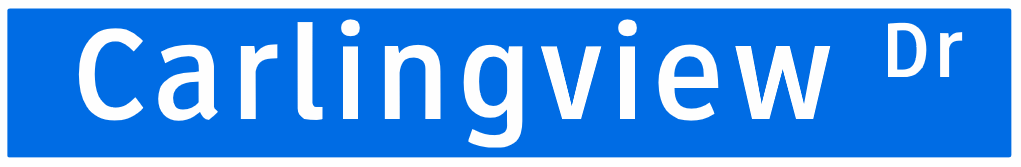
- Location: Highway 401 – North of Attwell Drive

Carlingview Drive is named for the former Carling O'Keefe (and current Molson) brewery found at the south terminus. The road is not directly named for John Carling the founder of Carling Brewery and predecessor to the Carling O'Keefe Brewery. The road winds through industrial properties in Etobicoke to the northern terminus at Woodbine Racetrack (at Entrance Road). It was also referred to as Fourth Line. The southern end of Carlingview Drive is actually a series of highway ramps:

- northbound traffic flows from an offramp from westbound Highway 401
- southbound traffic enters the eastbound Highway 401

=== Centennial Road ===
Centennial Road
- Location: Rolling Meadows – Ellesmere Road (interrupted by Highway 2A)

Centennial Road, despite travelling through an area that was developed during Canada's centennial, takes its name from the church at its intersection with Kingston Road. The church was named Centennial in honour of the 100th anniversary of the confederation of Canada. Many of the streets along or near Centennial Road are named after the Fathers of Confederation.

=== Christie Street ===
Christie Street

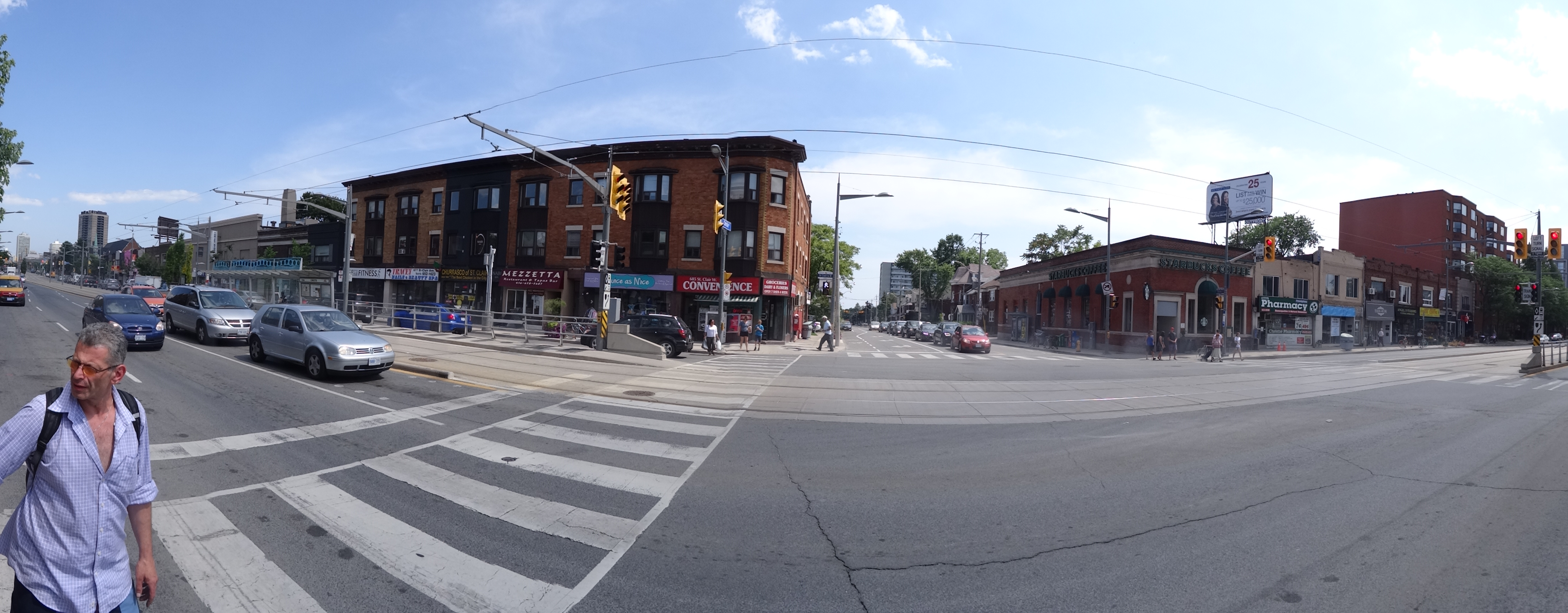
Looking south on Christie Street from St. Clair Avenue

Local folklore suggests that Christie Street is named for William Mellis Christie, founder of Christie & Brown Cookie Company. However, historical research indicates land purchased by merchant Peter McDougall, whose wife was named Christy, and maps showing "Christie Street" in 1835, over a decade before W.M. Christie's arrival in Canada.

A stretch of Bloor Street West both east and west of Christie Street is home to many of Toronto's Korean restaurants and stores. Christie Pits is a city park and baseball park located at the north-west corner of Christie Street and Bloor Street West intersection. The Toronto Maple Leafs of the Canadian Baseball League (formerly the Intercounty Baseball League) play at that baseball diamond. The area is served by Christie subway station and bus route 126 of the TTC public transportation network.

=== Church Street ===
Church Street
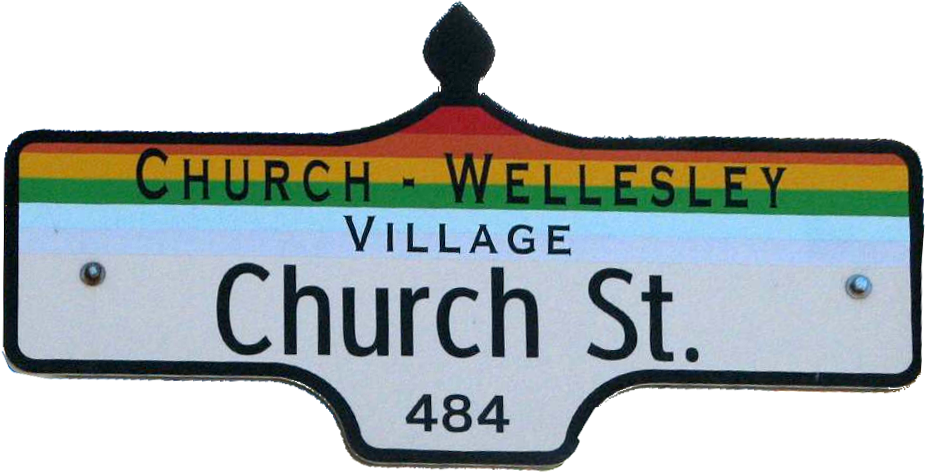
- Location: South of The Esplanade - Yonge Street (Continues north as Davenport Road)

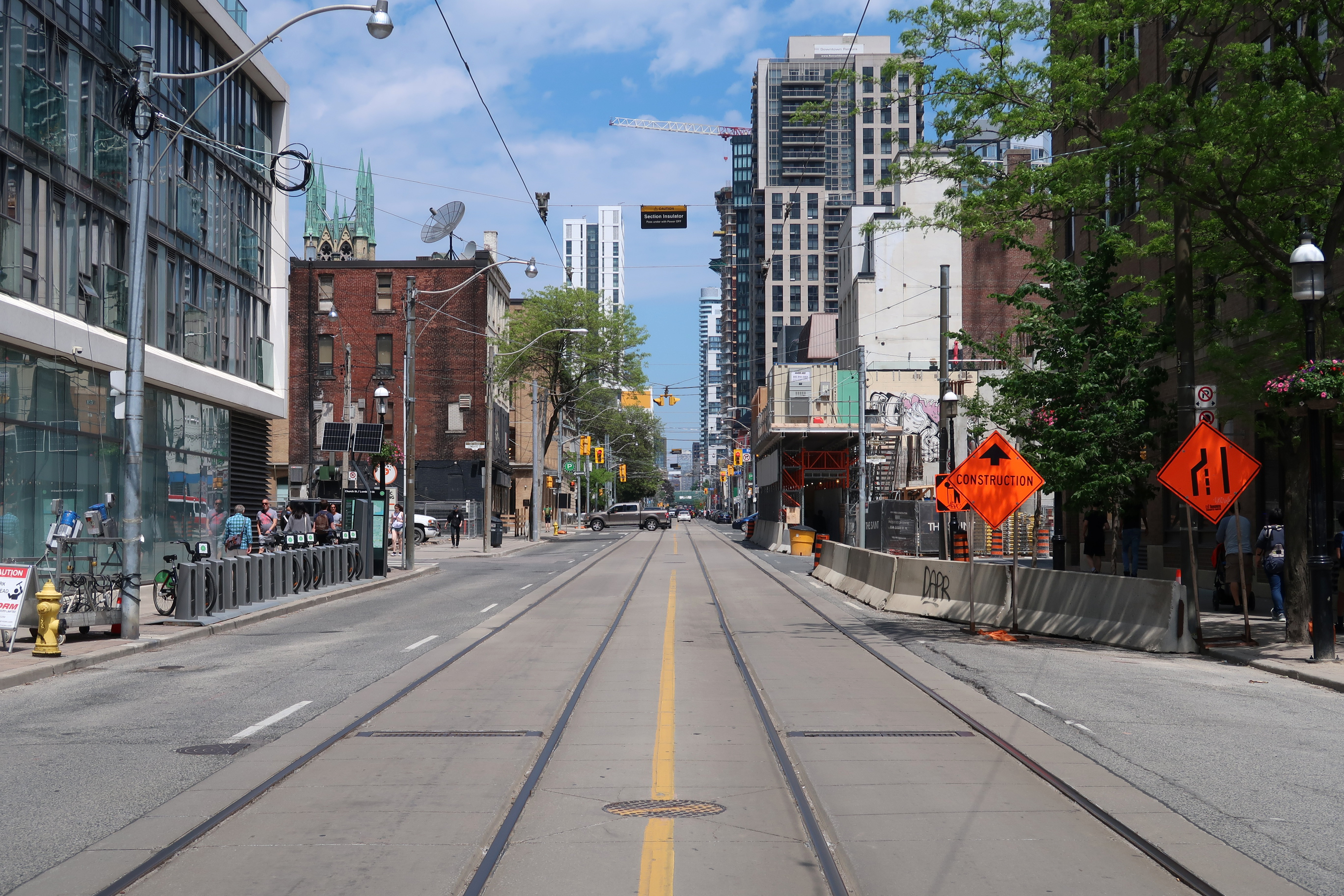
Looking north on Church Street from Adelaide Street East

Church Street is so named because where St. James Cathedral sits upon today, at King Street and Church, was the site of the first church in York, a wooden building built in 1807 and referred to simply as "the church". Three incarnations sat on the site of the current cathedral; the dedication to St. James came in 1828, four years before the construction of a new stone church. This building burnt shortly after becoming a cathedral. A new cathedral was constructed, only to burn down in the Great Fire of 1849. John Strachan, first Anglican Bishop of Toronto after 1839, rebuilt the present cathedral in 1853 (the spire was not completed until 1874) in a Gothic Revival style. The St. James Cathedral was the tallest structure in Toronto until the Royal York Hotel was completed in 1927.

At the corner of Church and Wellesley Streets is an LGBT-oriented enclave in Toronto. The area of Church Street and Wellesley Street (particularly along Church Street) is home to the annual Pride Toronto celebration. In 2014, rainbow crossings were painted at the intersections of Church and Alexander Streets and Church and Isabella Streets ahead of the WorldPride festival.

=== Conlins Road ===
Conlins Road
- Location: Military Trail - Sheppard Avenue East ()

Conlins Road was named for the Conlins family, prominent for their gravel company located in Highland Creek. It is a collector road serving the Highland Creek neighbourhood, and connecting it with nearby major roads. Conlins Road begins at Military Trail, near the University of Toronto Scarborough campus, and heads north as a residential road until reaching Ellesmere Road, where the street widens slightly and becomes a collector road. It then continues north over Highway 401 before ending at Sheppard Avenue East.

=== Coxwell Avenue ===
Coxwell Avenue
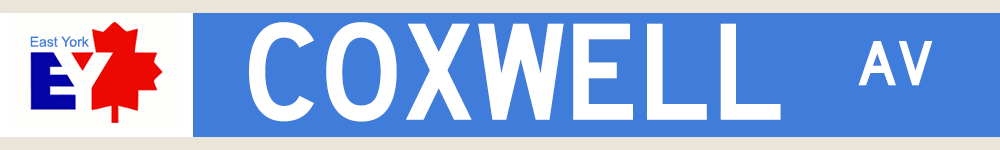
- Location: Queen Street East – O'Connor Drive (continues south as Emdaabiimok Avenue)

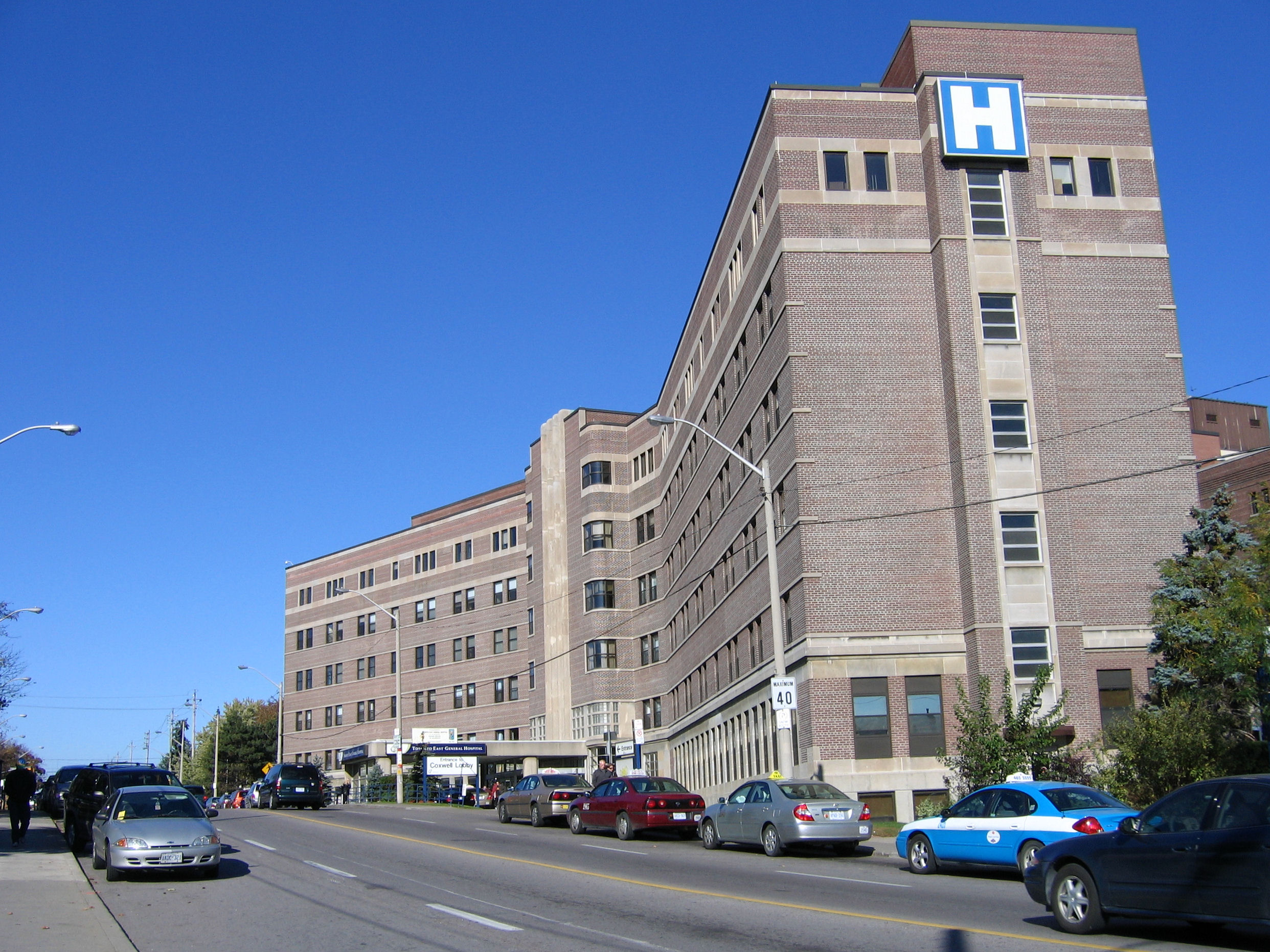
Michael Garron Hospital on Coxwell Avenue

Coxwell Avenue is named after Charles Coxwell Small, clerk of Upper Canada's Privy Council and a resident of the Berkeley House. The stretch between the intersections with both sections of Gerrard Street features shops that cater to Toronto's Indian and Pakistani communities. In 2024, a portion of said road previously known as Lower Coxwell Avenue, from Queen Street East to Lake Shore Boulevard East, was renamed to Emdaabiimok Avenue honouring and promoting Anishinaabe culture.

=== Don Mills Road ===
Don Mills Road
- Location: O'Connor Drive – Steeles Avenue East (continues north into Markham just before John Street and becomes Leslie Street)

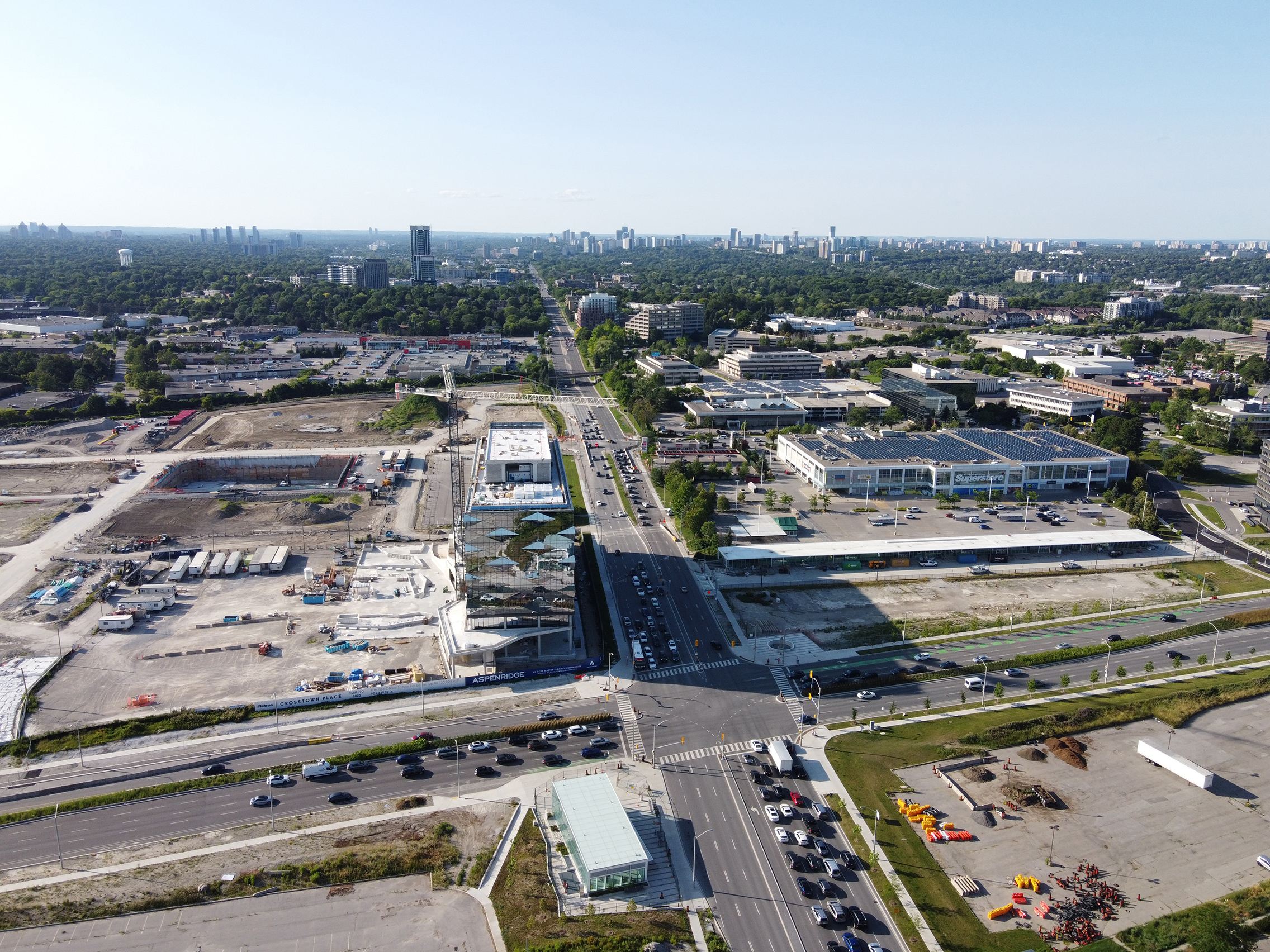
Looking north on Don Mills Road at Eglinton Avenue

Don Mills Road, known by various names over time including The Mill Road and the Don Independent Road, is named for the many saw and grist mills that established near the Forks of the Don in the early 19th century. At the time the road began at Winchester Street and Parliament Street and crossed the Don River at Riverdale Park. The road rose onto the table lands along what is now the entrance to the northbound Don Valley Parkway and followed Broadview north and O'Connor east before joining with the present-day Don Mills Road. The road ended at the Mills for a time, until farmers to the north on the land between the river valleys opened a new road to provide an easier route to carry their yields to the St. Lawrence Market. The new road cut through established parcels of land, and came to be known as the Don Independent Road. This road extended as far north as York Mills Road.

After the formation of Metropolitan Toronto, Don Mills was designated as part of the municipal network of major roads. It was widened to four lanes, then extended north over Highway 401 to Sheppard in 1964. The "peanut" was constructed shortly thereafter, and Don Mills was extended north of Steeles alongside suburban development in the 1970s. In 1987, the road was widened to six lanes alongside a recommendation to extend Leslie Street south of Eglinton to the Bayview Extension, and a proposal to try new high-occupancy vehicle lane. While Leslie Street was not extended, the HOV lanes were implemented between Overlea Blvd and Finch Avenue East.

=== Donlands Avenue ===
Donlands Avenue
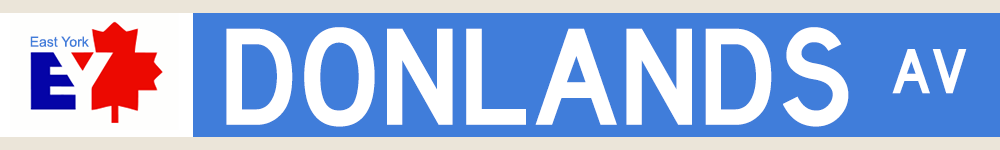
- Location: Danforth Avenue – Leaside Bridge (continues north of bridge as Millwood Road)

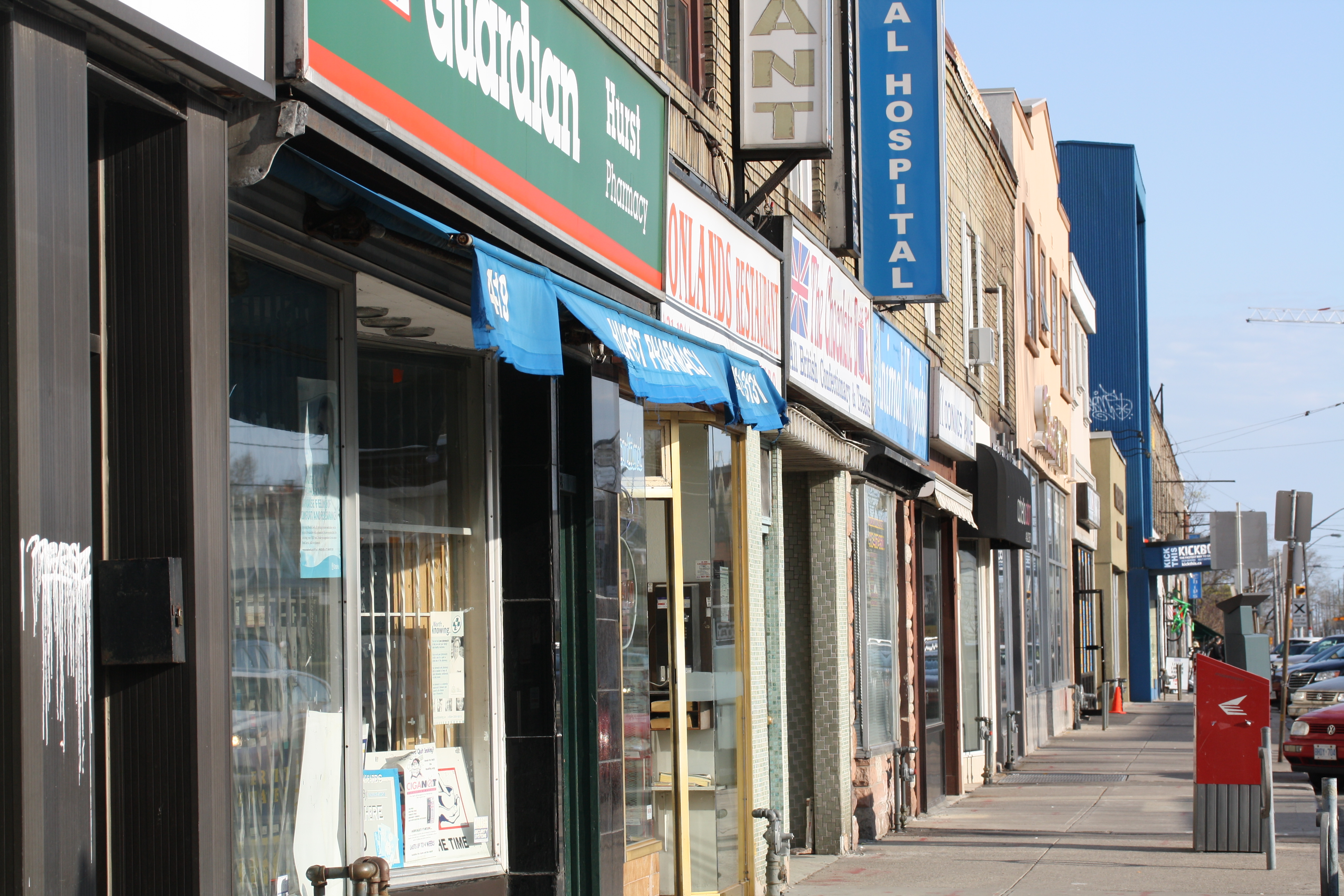
Storefronts on Donlands Avenue south of O'Connor Drive

Donlands Avenue begins at Danforth Avenue and ends at the foot of the Leaside Bridge. On the opposite side of the bridge, drivers continue on Millwood Road. It follows the same concession line as Leslie Street between the two sections. The northern section of Leslie was once named Donlands, but was renamed to Leslie Street in 1915 as the two were disconnected.

=== Dufferin Street ===
Dufferin Street
- Location: British Columbia Drive – Steeles Avenue West (interrupted by Downsview Airport) (continues north into Vaughan)

Dufferin Street, known as the Side Line until 1876, was renamed in honour of Governor General Frederick Temple Blackwood, Lord Dufferin. Dufferin served as Governor General between 1872 and 1878, and presided over the opening of the first Canadian National Exhibition in 1878. Dufferin Street begins at Exhibition Place and travels north into Vaughan. The road is interrupted between Wilson Avenue and Sheppard Avenue West by Downsview Park. Dufferin Street was disjointed at Queen Street West by a railway, a detour famously known as the Dufferin Jog. Following decades of negotiation, construction began in 2007 on removing the jog by excavating a tunnel beneath the active tracks. This tunnel was completed and opened to traffic on November 10, 2010.

=== Galloway Road ===
Galloway Road
- Location: Guildwood Parkway - North of Lawrence Avenue East

The road is named for the Galloway family and settler Ignatius Galloway who began farming in the area along Concession Road D.

=== Greenwood Avenue ===
Greenwood Avenue
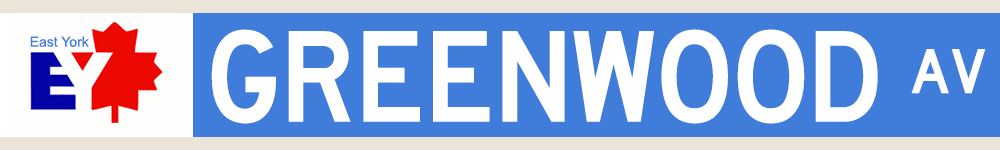
- Location: Queen Street East – O'Connor Drive

Greenwood Avenue, originally Greenwood Lane, was named after the Greenwood family, who were market gardeners and carriage makers. John (d. 1866) and Kate Greenwood were owners of the Puritan Tavern at the corner of Queen Street and Greenwood Lane. The area was home to over a dozen brickmaking factories in the 19th century, including one whose excavations can still be detected at Greenwood Subway Yard and in Greenwood Park at the intersection with Dundas Street.

=== Highway 27 ===
(see Brown's Line and Ontario Highway 27)

Highway 27
- Location: Highway 427 – Steeles Avenue West (continues north into Vaughan)

=== Islington Avenue ===
Islington Avenue
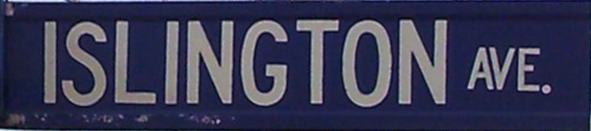
- Location: Lake Shore Boulevard West – Steeles Avenue West (continues north into Vaughan)

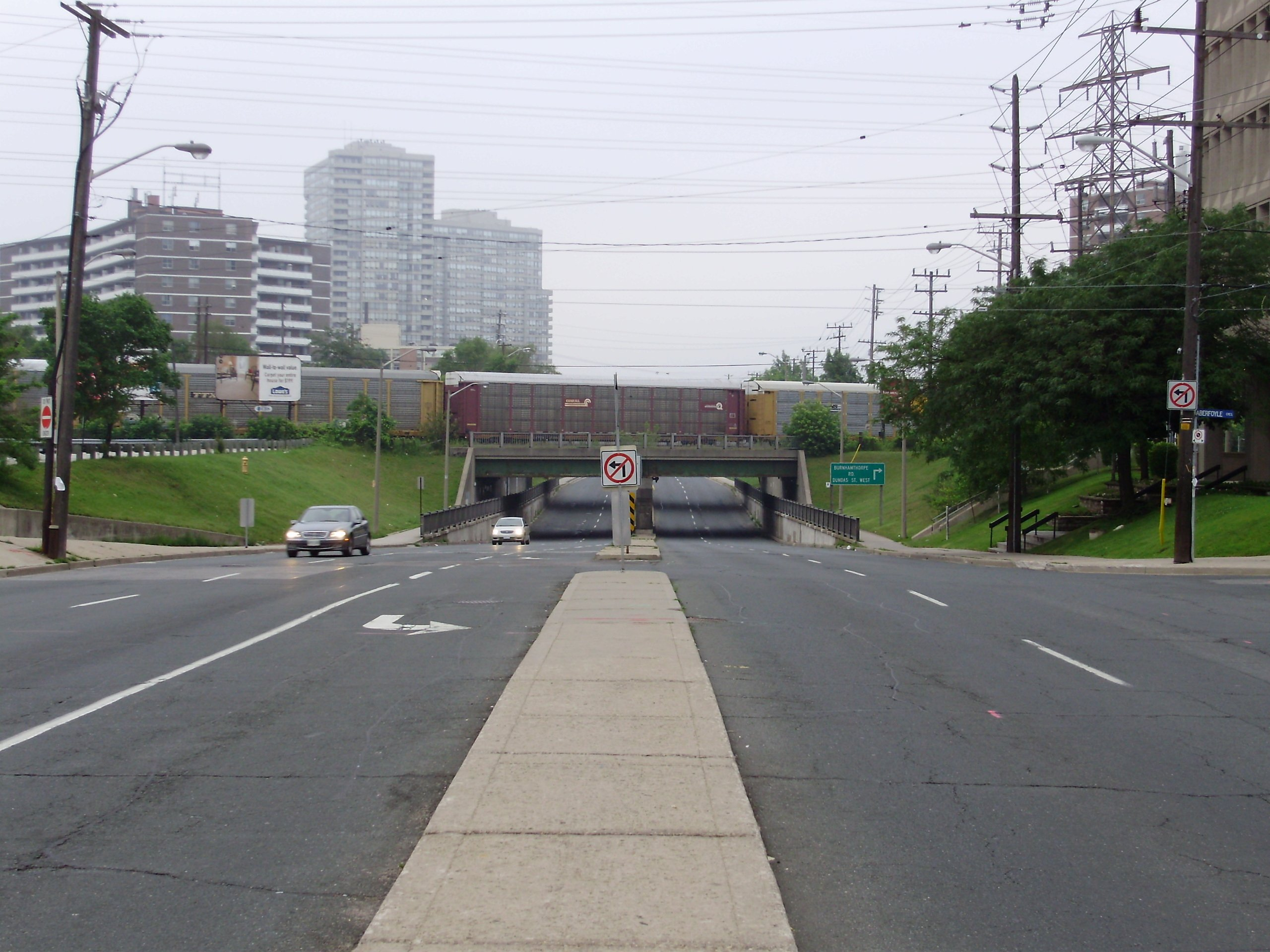
Just north of Bloor Street West, Islington Avenue is bridged by the CPR midtown line.

Islington Avenue is named for the village it passed at Dundas Street. The village of Islington used to be known as Mimico, and was often confused with a second village of that name in Etobicoke on Lake Ontario and which had obtained a post office called Mimico in 1857. In 1859, in order to obtain their own post office, residents of the Mimico on Dundas Street held a meeting to select a new name in Thomas Smith's Inn (located on the southwest corner of Dundas Street and today's Islington Avenue.) When the attendees could not reach unanimous agreement on a new name, they invited Smith's wife, Elizabeth, into the meeting and asked her to rename the village. She selected Islington, after her birthplace near London, England.

Islington Avenue begins at Lake Shore Boulevard West in New Toronto, and progresses north to Steeles Avenue West, where it crosses into Vaughan in York Region as York Regional Road 17 and prior to 1998 as York Regional Road 7. The road is mostly suburban in nature, passing through largely residential sections of Etobicoke.

=== Jameson Avenue ===
Jameson Avenue
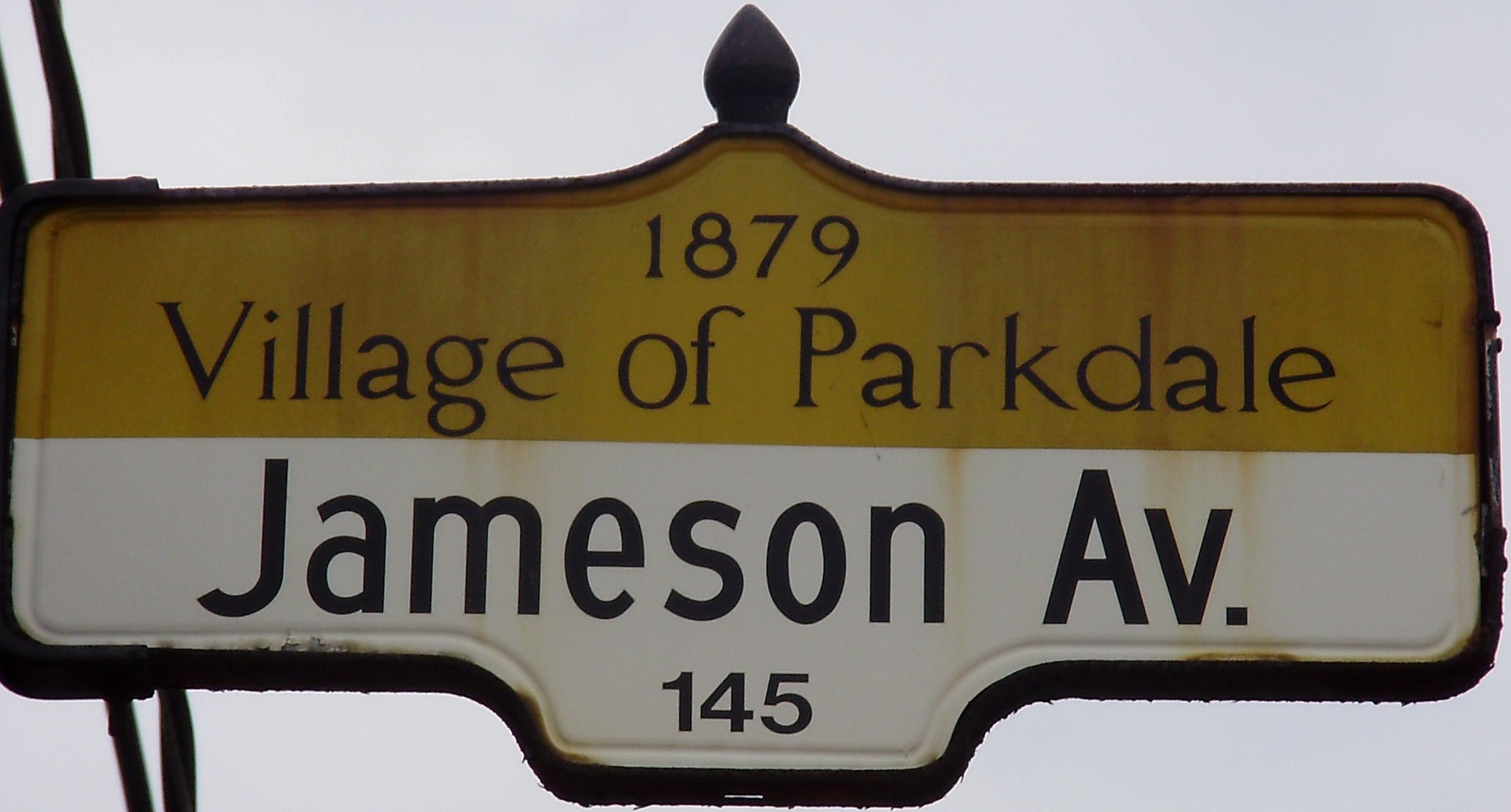
- Location: Lake Shore Boulevard West – Queen Street (continues north as Lansdowne Avenue via Queen Street)

Jameson Avenue is named for Robert Sympson Jameson, Attorney General for Upper Canada in the late 1830s. Jameson bought land south of Queen Street between the second and third concession sideroads (Dufferin and Parkside today) in the late 1840s. Jameson Avenue was built through his property when it was subdivided by the growing city. The road begins at Lake Shore Boulevard West, where access is provided to the Gardiner Expressway. The road crosses the expressway and travels north through Parkdale between rows of apartment buildings. Jameson Avenue ends at Queen Street West; the traffic signal is coordinated with the southern terminus of Lansdowne Avenue, nearby to the east.

=== Jane Street ===
Jane Street
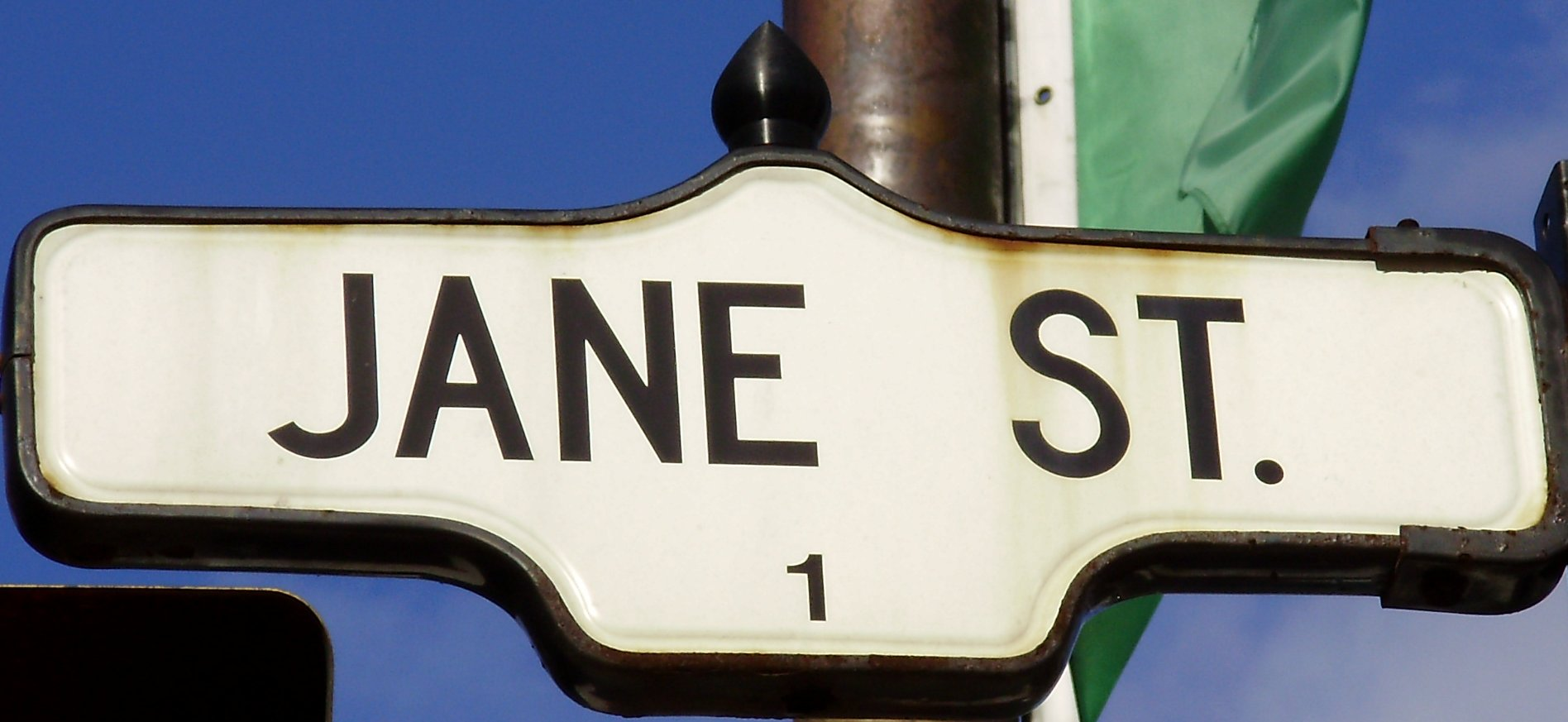
- Location: Bloor Street West – Steeles Avenue West (continues north into Vaughan)

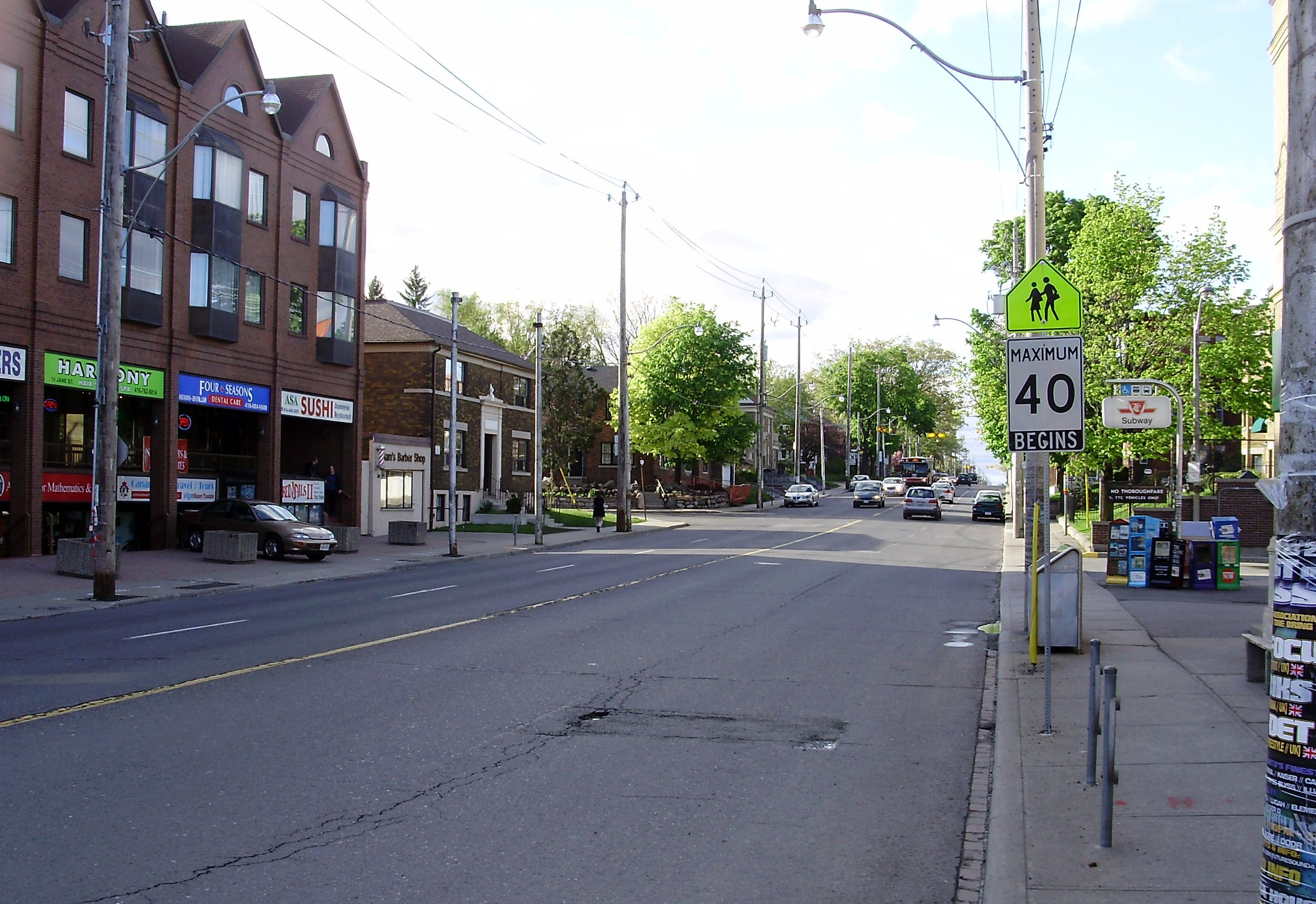
Looking north on Jane Street from Bloor Street

Jane Street begins at Bloor Street and continues north into Vaughan to near the Holland River in King Township. It was named after Jane Barr by her husband James. They immigrated from Glasgow in 1907, and a few years later, James became a real estate developer north of Toronto. James named numerous streets in the development after his children, but the most important was named after his wife Jane. Originally, the street continued south to Lake Ontario with a sinuous course, but that section was redesignated as South Kingsway after Bloor Street was extended west across the Humber River (where it originally ended) by being realigned into a reverse curve which incorporated a short length of the southern segment of Jane, severing it from the section north of Bloor.

The Toronto Transit Commission operates Jane subway station at Jane and Bloor Street on Line 2 Bloor–Danforth. Before the subway opened, this intersection was the western terminus of the Bloor streetcar line. Proposed in the 2007 Transit City plan was the Jane LRT, a light rail line to run entirely along Jane through the city from the Jane subway Station and north into Vaughan. North of Steeles in Vaughan, the Line 1 Yonge–University subway parallels the street up to Highway 7, with stations at Highway 407 (Highway 407 station) and Highway 7 (Vaughan Metropolitan Centre) This section of the line is the only part of the subway system located outside of Toronto proper.

Vaughan Mills and Canada's Wonderland are on Jane Street in Vaughan.

The title character of the Barenaked Ladies song "Jane" is Jane St. Clair, and is named after the intersection of Jane and St. Clair Avenue. Steven Page recalls that co-writer Stephen Duffy saw the intersection on a map and remarked that it sounded like the most beautiful intersection in the world; "I didn't have the heart to tell him it wasn't".

One of Toronto's most notable suburban intersections is Jane and Finch, which is directly served by Line 6 Finch West LRT.

=== Jarvis Street ===
Jarvis Street
- Location: Queen's Quay – Charles Street ()

Jarvis Street recognizes the Jarvis family, who lived on land north of Queen Street and centred on Jarvis Street between 1824 and 1846. William Jarvis was Provincial Secretary and Registrar of Records between 1792 and his death in 1817. His son, Samuel Jarvis, won the last duel held in Toronto when he mortally wounded his neighbour and rival John Ridout. He was arrested as a result, but later acquitted, after which he took over his father's position. The increasing debt of the family led Samuel to sell off the property beginning in 1846. His house, Hazel Burn, was demolished to make way for Jarvis Street. Mutual Street was established at the same time on the property line between the former rivals.

Jarvis Street begins at Queen's Quay north of the Lake Ontario shoreline. It travels north to one block south of Bloor Street, where most traffic is siphoned on to Mount Pleasant Road. Jarvis previously extended to Bloor Street, but was truncated on August 26, 2009. The section between Charles Street and Bloor Street was renamed Ted Rogers Way.

=== Jones Avenue ===
Jones Avenue
- Location: Danforth Avenue – Queen Street East

Jones Avenue is an arterial road located between Danforth Avenue and Queen Street and is the main road serving Blake-Jones and Leslieville neighbourhoods.

=== Keele Street ===
Keele Street
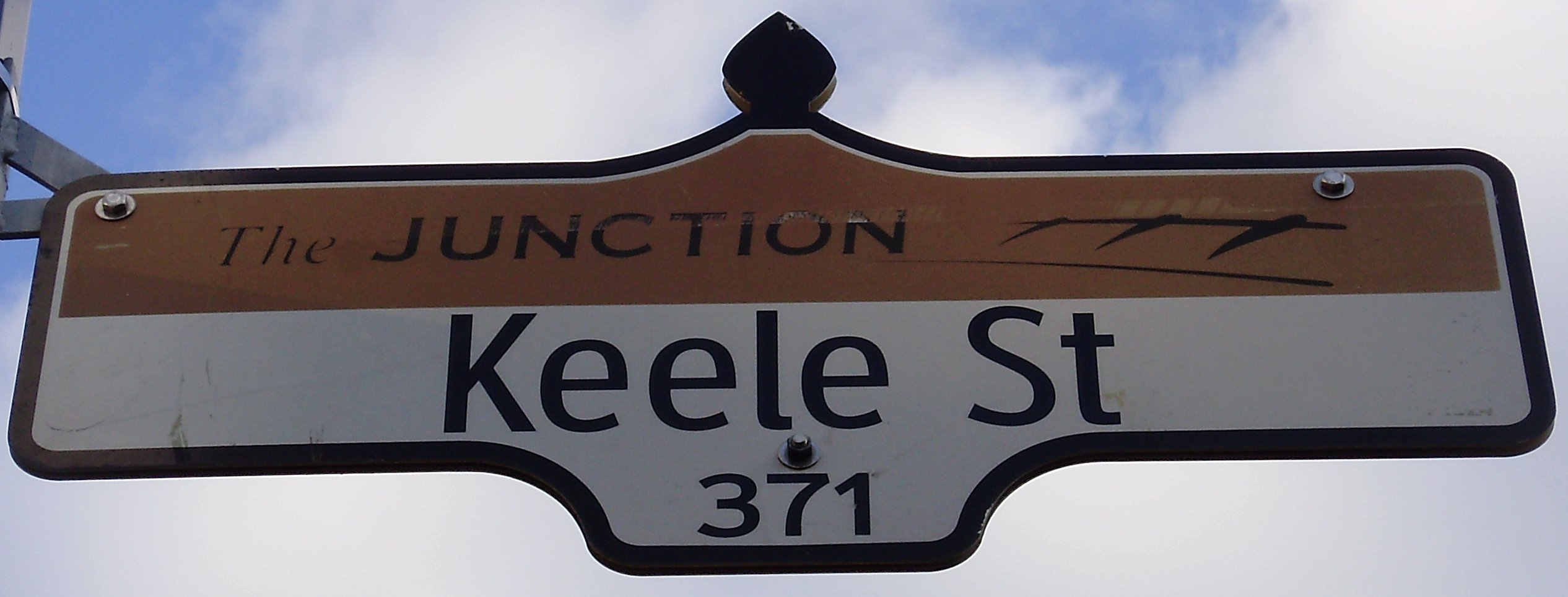
- Location: Bloor Street – St. Clair Avenue; South of Lavender Road – Steeles Avenue (continues north into Vaughan)

Keele Street is named for lawyer William Keele. William owned land across the road from John Scarlett at Dundas and Keele Streets, gradually expanding his acreage in the mid-19th century. William opened the Carleton Race Course in 1857, which held the first Queen's Plate in 1860.

Keele Street has two jogs within Toronto: one between St. Clair Avenue and Rogers Road and another one block north of Eglinton Avenue.

=== Kennedy Road ===
Kennedy Road
- Location: Highview Avenue – Steeles Avenue East (continues north into Markham)

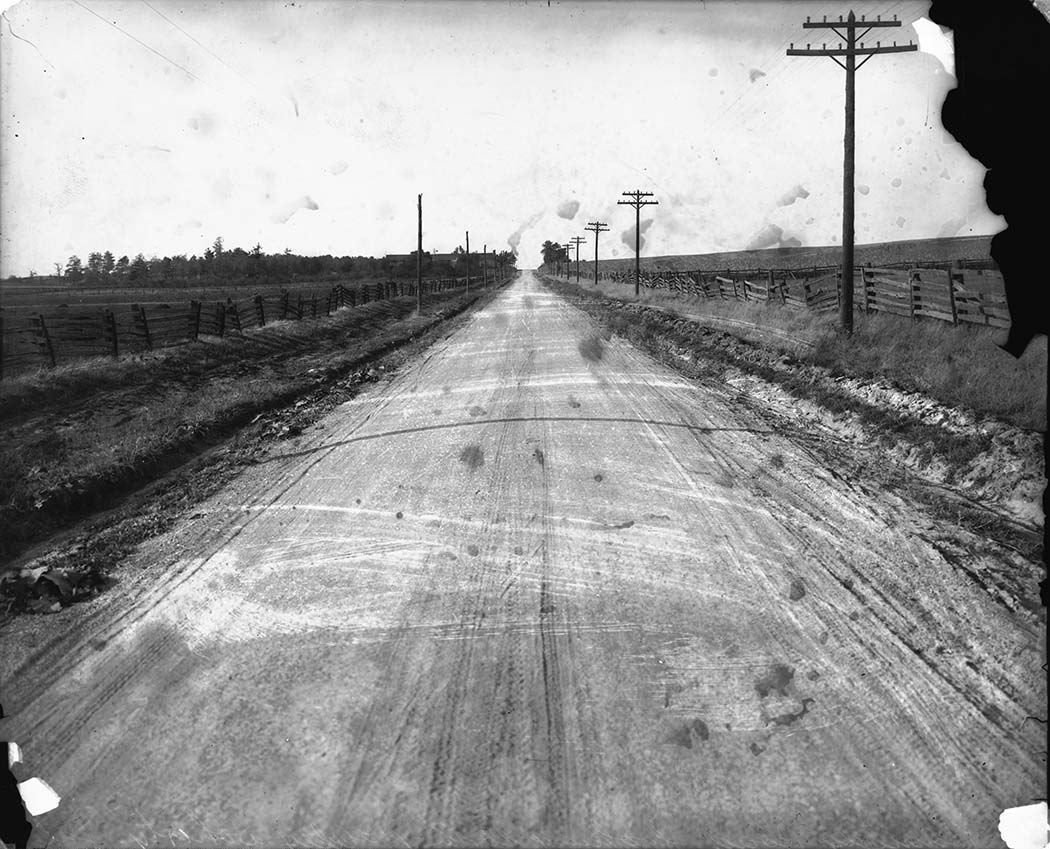
Kennedy Road, south of Ellesmere Road, c. 1925

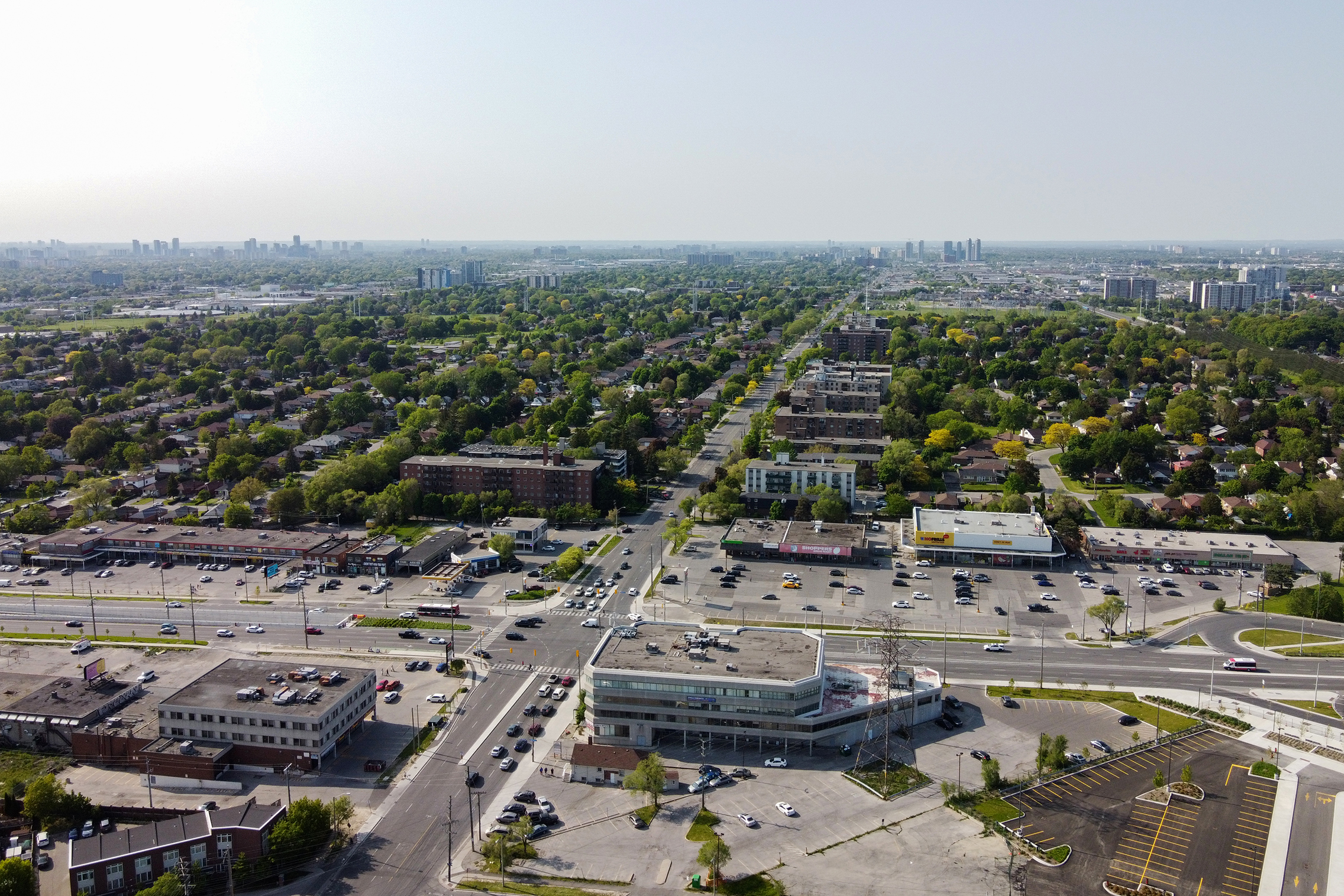
Kennedy Road at Eglinton Avenue East (2023)

Kennedy Road is named for the Kennedy family, one of the many early farming settlers in the 18th and 19th centuries (to which Premier Thomas Laird Kennedy belonged, but who settled in what is today Mississauga, where another Kennedy Road is named after him), who settled along the early concession road. According to Robert Bonis, the road is named for settler and friend of David Thomson named James Kennedy. It is also linked to Private John Kennedy of the 3rd Regiment of the York Militia (now Queen's York Rangers (1st American Regiment)) who was granted 200 acres (0.81 km^{2}) of land near Kennedy Road and Ellesmere Road. Later Kennedys acquired land further north (Samuel and William Kennedy had 100 acres at Kennedy and Sheppard) and Lyman Kennedy became Reeve of Scarborough Township from 1896 to 1901.

The Toronto section of the road is mainly residential with high-rise apartment buildings. However, there is a section between Lawrence Avenue East and north of Sheppard Avenue East, which is dominated by commercial plazas and malls, including Kennedy Commons.

North of Steeles Avenue, Kennedy Road continues as York Regional Road 3 north to shore of Lake Simcoe through Markham, Whitchurch-Stouffville, and East Gwillimbury. Before renaming, it was signed as 6th Line. Sections from Steeles Avenue East to north of Denison Street and north of Highway 407 to just south of 16th Avenue were diversions from the original roadway. The latter was created due to opposition to proposed widening of the section running in historic Unionville in the 1960s, which is now referred to as Main Street Unionville (as well as a laneway to the east of the Main Street). The former is now called Old Kennedy Road and Fresno Court. The road is cut off north of Davis Drive in Newmarket due to the Bendor and Grave Tract (York Regional Forest), resuming north of Herald Road to Lake Drive East on the shore of Lake Simcoe in Georgina.

=== Kipling Avenue ===
Kipling Avenue
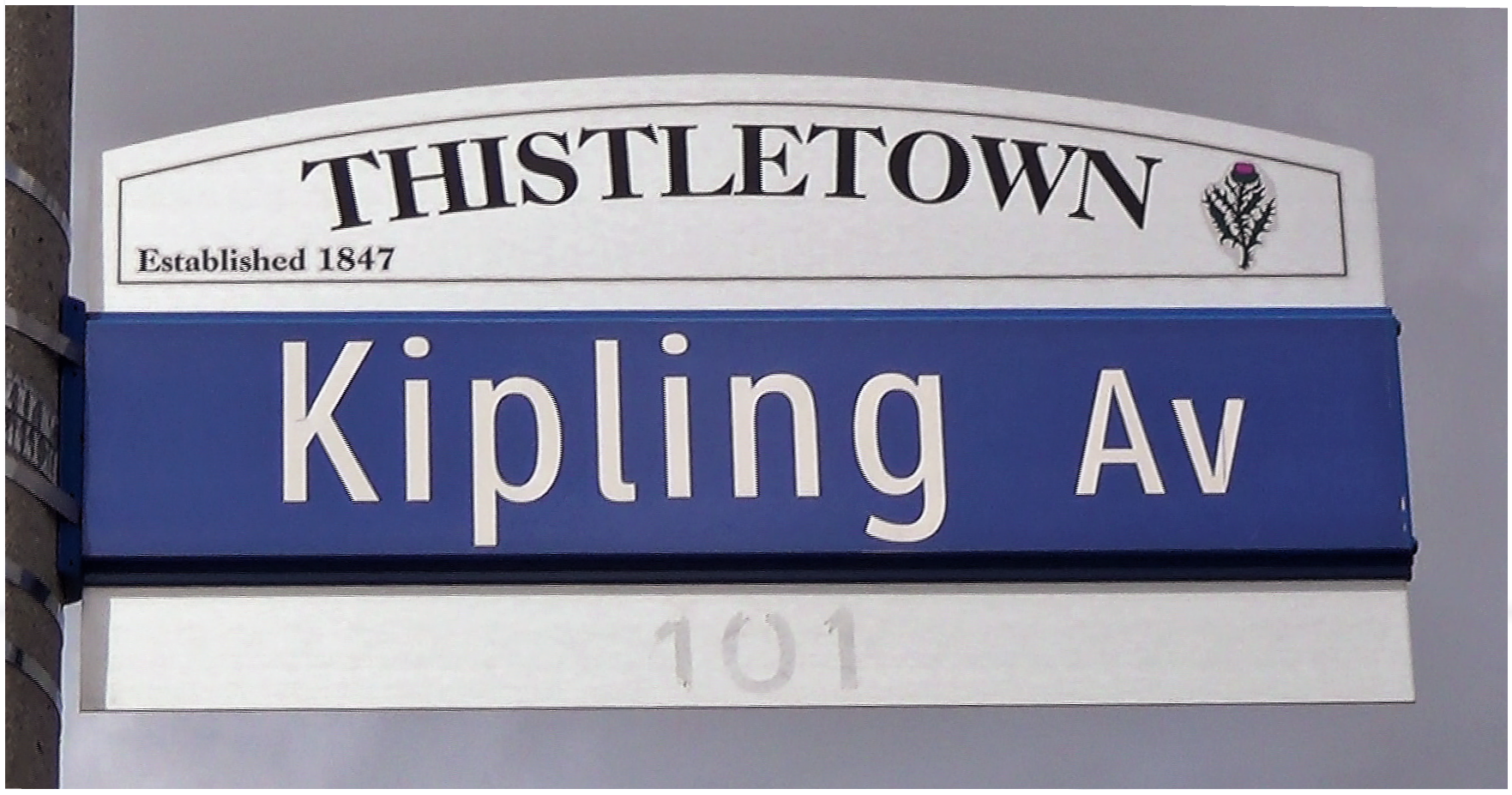
- Location: Lake Shore Boulevard West – Steeles Avenue West (resumes south of Highway 7 in Vaughan)

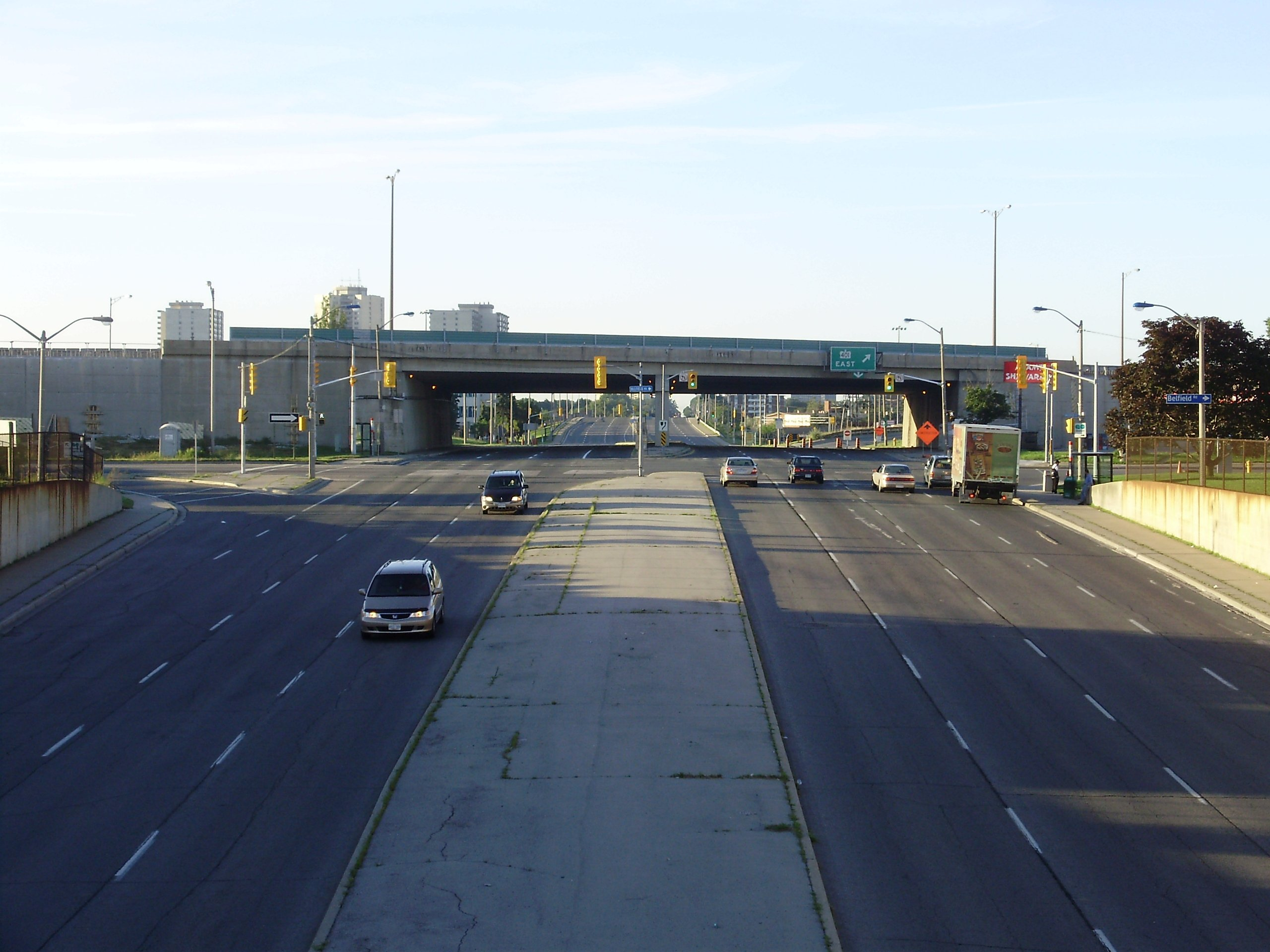
Highway 409 above Kipling Avenue

Kipling Avenue is rumoured to be named after Rudyard Kipling, author of The Jungle Book. Kipling was scheduled to read at the Woodbridge Fair in 1907, but was forced to cancel at the last moment for reasons of health; it is said that the road to Woodbridge, thereto referred to as Mimico Street, was named in honour of the anticipated author. The road was named by 1908, but may have been named earlier in honour of a local farmer with that last name.

=== Laird Drive ===
Laird Drive
- Location: Millwood Road – Glenvale Boulevard (continues southeast as Millwood Road)

Looking south on Laird Drive from Eglinton Avenue in 2013 before the construction of Laird station

The source of the origin of Laird Drive is disputed.

One theory is that the street takes its name from Robert Laird Borden, Prime Minister of Canada between 1911 and 1920. Borden, whose middle name is his mother's maiden name, led the country through the First World War.

Another theory is that the name comes from Alexander Laird, a Scottish-born banker, and general manager of the Canadian Bank of Commerce in 1907. He played a large role in the creation of Leaside, where Laird Drive is found.

=== Lansdowne Avenue ===
Lansdowne Avenue
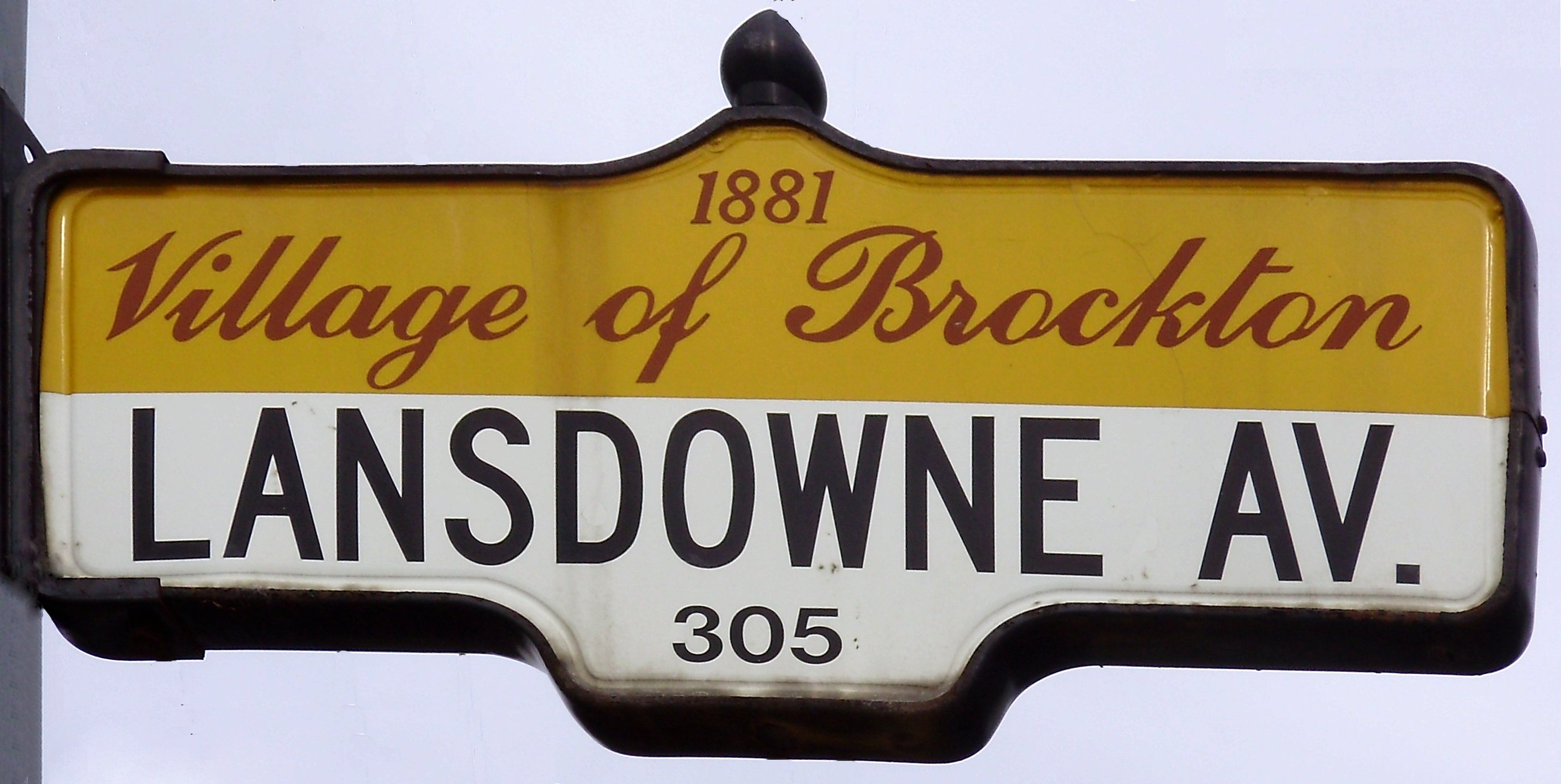
- Location: Queen Street – St. Clair Avenue West (continues south as Jameson Avenue via Queen Street)

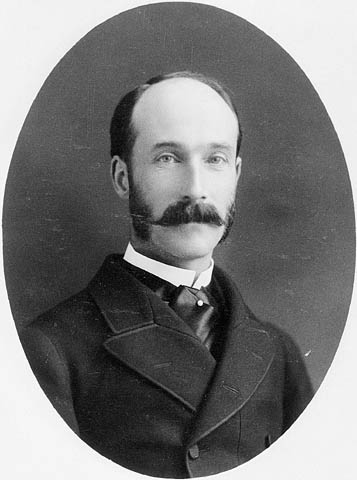
Marquis of Lansdowne

Lansdowne Avenue formerly known as North Jameson Avenue. It was renamed by the Parkdale village council in 1883 to honour the new Governor General, Henry Petty-Fitzmaurice, 5th Marquess of Lansdowne, who served between 1883 and 1888. Lansdowne Avenue begins at Queen Street West, a short distance east of the northern terminus of Jameson Avenue. It passes beneath the Kitchener GO line, meets Dundas Street West and College Street, then passes Lansdowne Subway Station at Bloor Street West. The road continues north past Dupont Street, then passes beneath the CPR Midtown line before ending at St. Clair Avenue West. A short segment of Lansdowne Avenue runs between Wingold Avenue and Glengrove Avenue approximately grid north of the rest of Lansdowne Avenue.

=== Leslie Street ===
Leslie Street
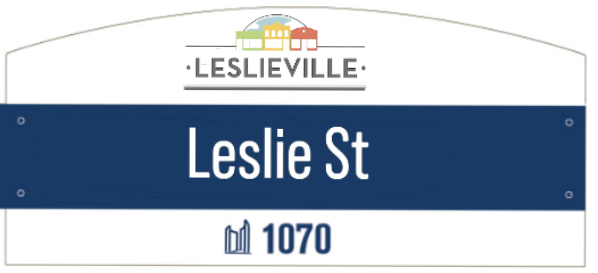
- Location: Unwin Avenue – Ivy Avenue, Wicksteed Avenue - Vanderhoof Avenue, Eglinton Avenue East - Steeles Avenue East (resumes north of John Street in Markham via Don Mills Road)

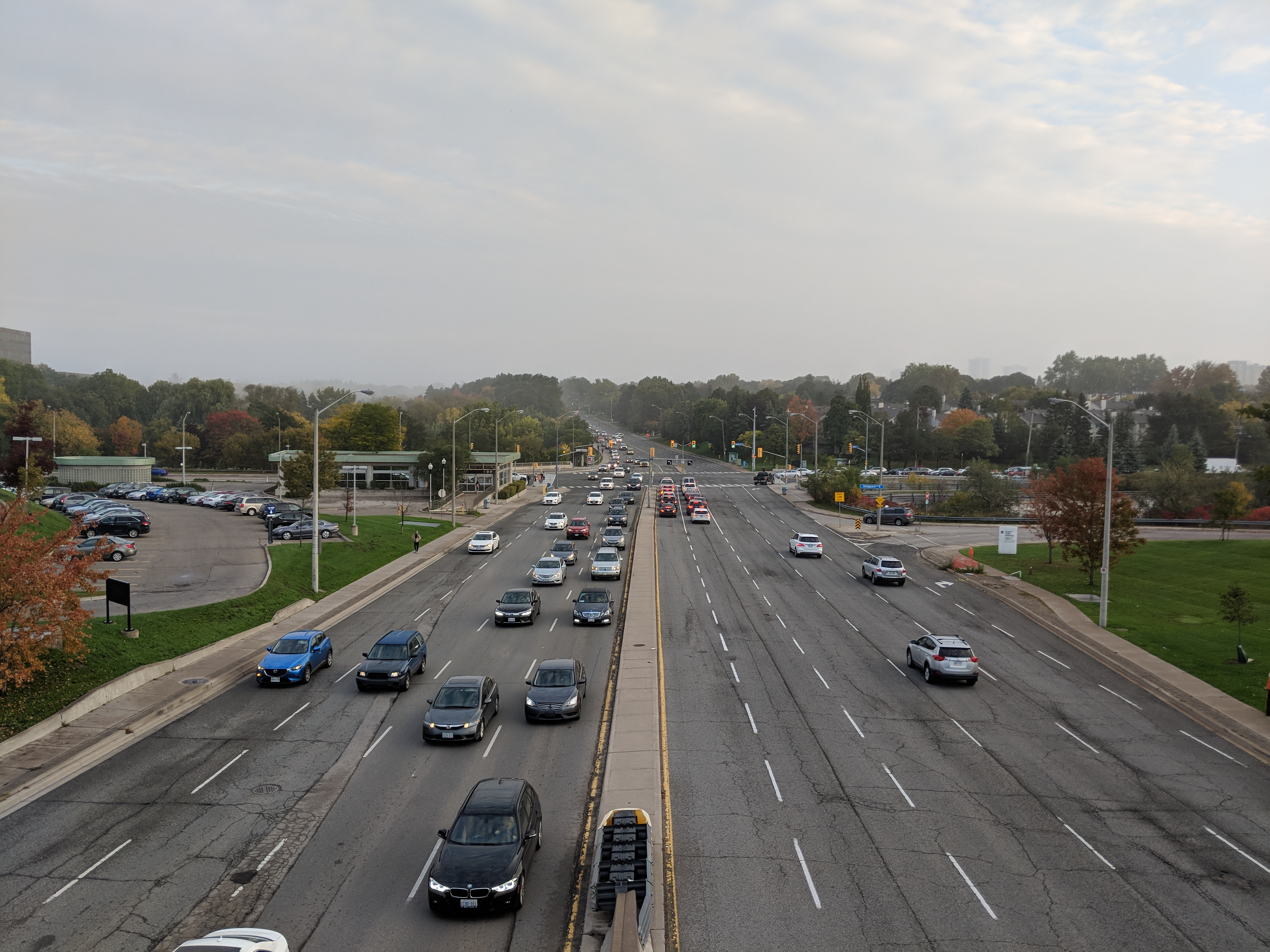
Leslie and Sheppard intersection in North York

Leslie Street was the second concession line, laid about 13,200 ft (4,000 m) east of Yonge Street. It was named for nursery owner George Leslie, who owned a store, Toronto Nurseries, on Queen Street in Leslieville.

Leslie Street, which has four separate sections, begins at Lake Ontario on the Leslie Street Spit. It continues north to the railway tracks north of Gerrard Street East, where the first segment ends just north of Ivy Avenue. Donlands Avenue, which runs from the north side of the railway tracks to north of O'Connor Drive (travels northwest to meet with Pape Avenue to become Millwood Road), used to be another segment of Leslie. The second segment is a single-block long side street between Wicksteed Avenue and Vanderhoof Avenue in the Leaside's industrial area. It is separated from the third segment by the Ernest Thompson Seton parklands.

The third segment begins at Eglinton Avenue near E.T. Seton and Wilket Creek Park. It continues to Steeles Avenue, where it leaves Toronto and enters York Region.

=== Main Street ===
Main Street
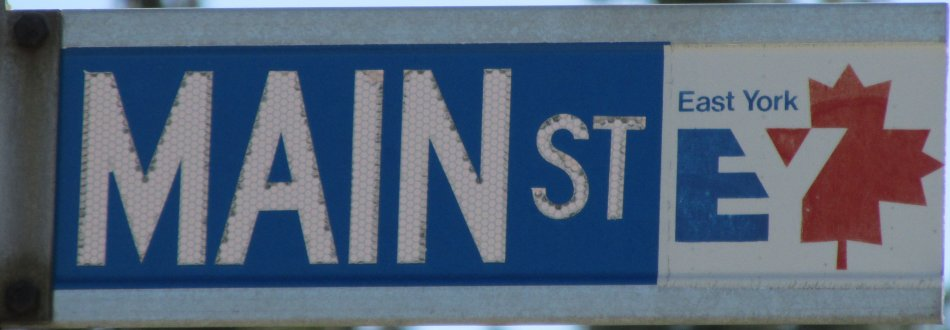
- Location: Kingston Road - Hamstead Avenue

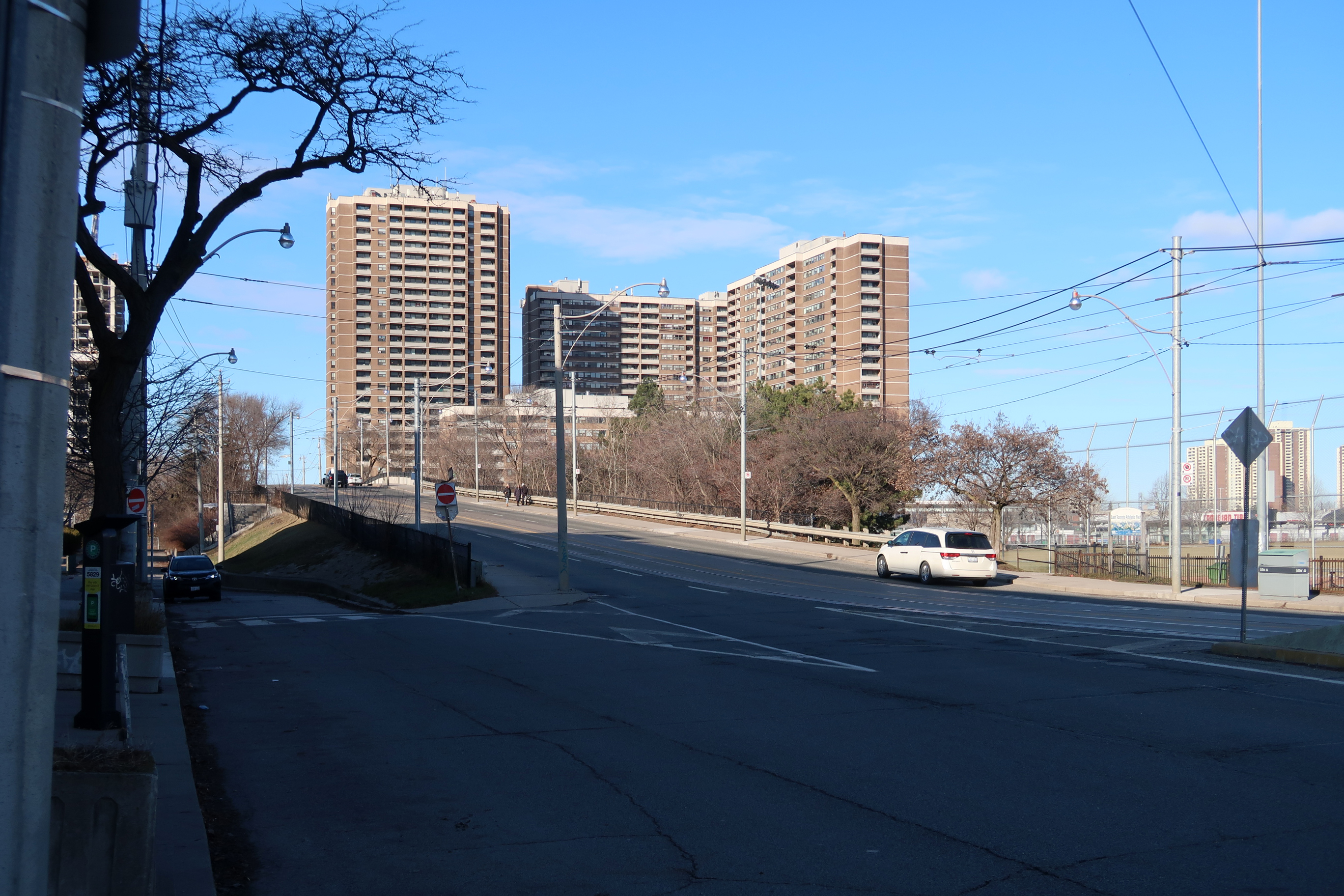
Main Street looking north from Upper Beaches

Main Street used to be the central street of the independent town of East Toronto. The Toronto Transit Commission's Main Street subway station is located at its intersection with Danforth Avenue as well as GO Transit's Danforth GO Station on the Lakeshore East line.

=== Markham Road ===
Markham Road
- Location: Hill Crescent – Steeles Avenue East (continues north into Markham)

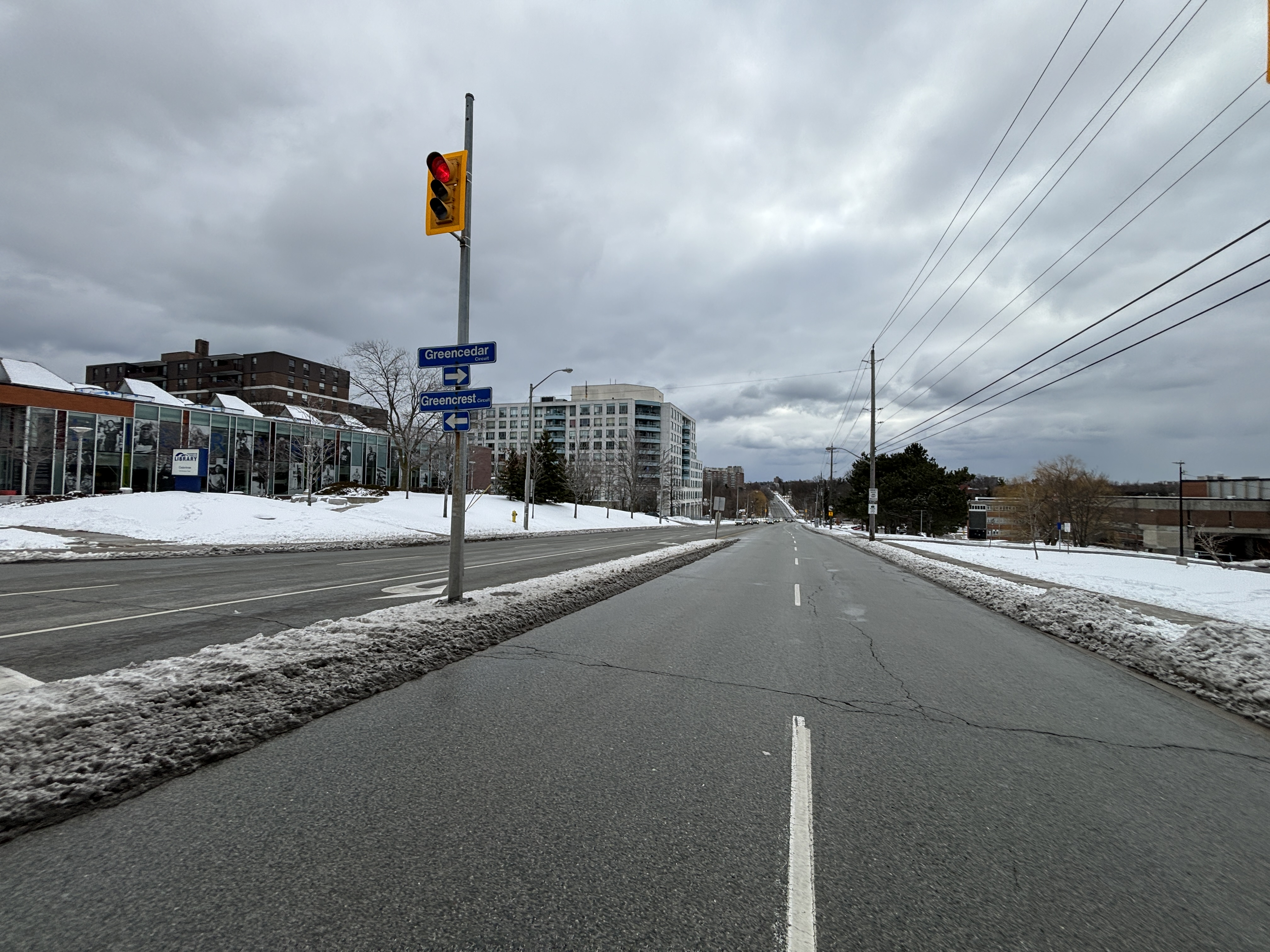
Markham Road near Toronto Public Library - Cedarbrae

Originally the Markham and Scarborough Plank Road, the concession line that led to the town of Markham was an early plank road. Existing first between the Danforth Road (now Painted Post) and the town, it was later extended south to Kingston Road and north to Stouffville. Alongside the construction of the Toronto Bypass (now Highway 401), Highway 48 was extended south, from near Beaverton, to where Markham Road would intersect the new "superhighway". It was originally intended to be upgraded to a freeway that would wrap around the eastern side of Lake Simcoe and end in Orillia or north of Sutherland. However, with the construction of the Don Valley Parkway, a routing running along or parallel to Woodbine Avenue would ultimately be chosen, becoming Highway 404. The Toronto Transit Commission's 102 Markham Rd provides service along the length of the road. It operates from Warden station on Line 2 Bloor–Danforth and terminates at Steeles Avenue in Toronto, and on its 102D branch terminates at Major Mackenzie Drive in Markham.

Markham Road begins at Hill Crescent, south of Kingston Road. It proceeds through Scarborough to Steeles Avenue East, but continues into York Region, where it is also designated as York Regional Road 68. Between Eglinton Avenue and Lawrence Avenue, the road crosses the Highland Creek ravine; one of the only crossings of the ravine not bypassed by a high-level bridge. South of Sheppard Avenue, most of the route is abutted by a mix of apartments and commercial strip plazas. North of Sheppard is occupied entirely by expanses of industrial land. North of Steeles and south of Highway 407 is occupied by residential, big box stores, and plazas. Between Highway 407 and Sixteenth Avenue, it is named Main Street Markham in Markham Village, that city's historic, original downtown. The Markham Road name ends at Major Mackenzie Drive.

=== Marlee Avenue ===
Marlee Avenue
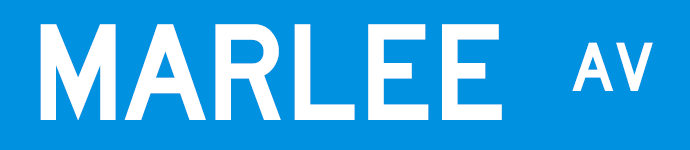
- Length: 2 km (1.2 mi)
- Location: Eglinton Avenue West – Lawrence Avenue West (Continues north to Lawrence Allen Centre)

Marlee Avenue used to be known as Lyon Avenue (southern segment in York) and Woodmount Avenue (northern segment in North York). The name was changed in 1953 at the request of Bernice Stein, who lived at 184 Woodmount Avenue. It is named for Mrs. Stein's niece. In addition, after the name change, both segments were connected and straightened. Marlee Avenue connects Eglinton Avenue West with Lawrence Avenue West to the west of Allen Road. At its northern end, it has a terminating vista of Lawrence Allen Centre.

=== Martin Grove Road ===
Martin Grove Road
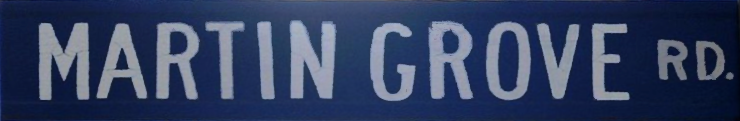
- Location: Bloor Street West – Steeles Avenue West (continues north into Vaughan and ends at Highway 27)

Martin Grove Road is an artery commencing at Bloor Street West but not becoming a major road until it intersects with Burnhamthorpe Road. It continues north until it ends at Highway 27 north of the city. The road was once called the Second Concession but became the current name around 1950. It is believed that the road was named after a local fruit merchant. However, there are no clear references found to prove this.

=== McCowan Road ===
McCowan Road
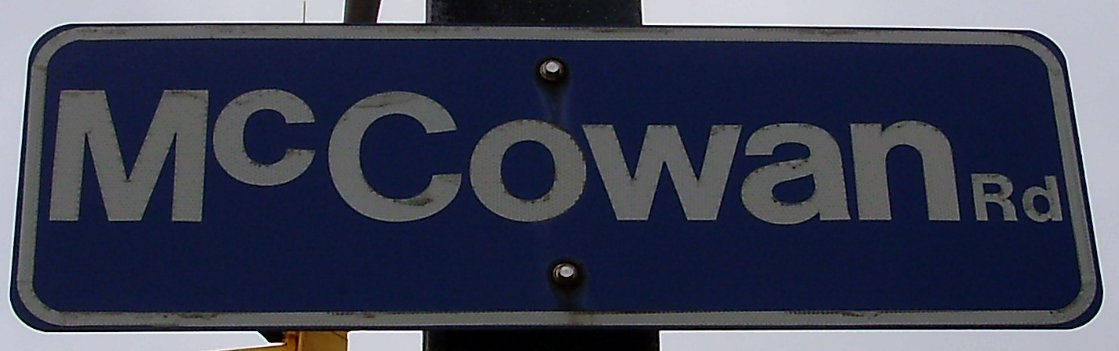
- Location: Kingston Road – Steeles Avenue East (continues south as Cathedral Bluffs Drive; north into Markham; interrupted by Highland Creek)

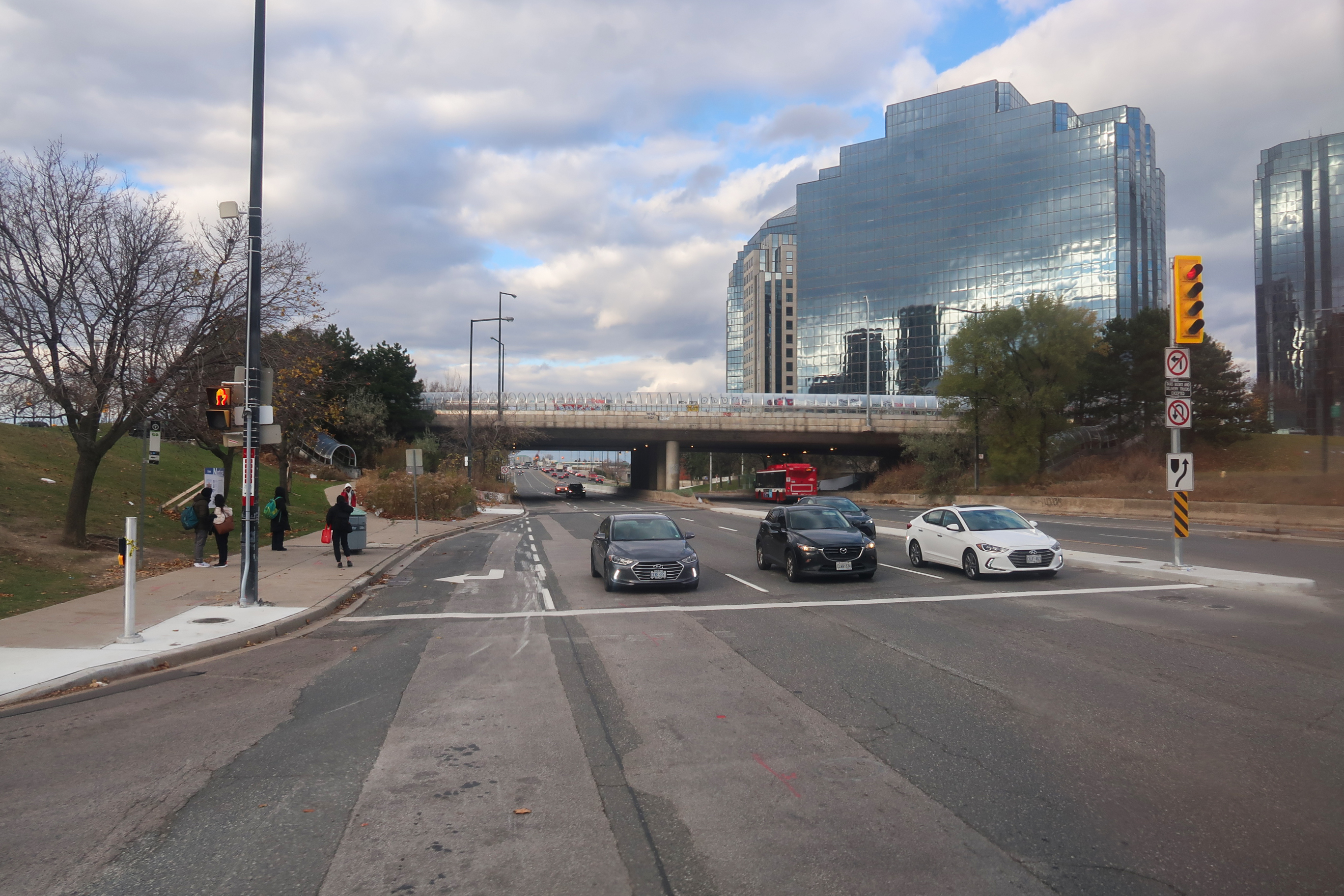
The elevated guideway of the closed Line 3 Scarborough passes above McCowan Road

McCowan Road is named after James McCowan, the first of the McCowan family who immigrated from Scotland, who established the McCowan family farm near the Scarborough Bluffs in 1833. The street, the former Lot 22, sometimes referred to as 7th Concession Road in Markham and later McCowan's Sideroad, was officially renamed McCowan Road by Scarborough Township in 1956.

McCowan Road begins at Kingston Road and briefly breaks north of Eglinton Avenue, before continuing again at the north end of Danforth Road and extending north to Steeles Avenue and into York Region as Regional Road 67. Before renaming it was signed as 7th Line in Markham. The brief 375-metre (1,230 ft) break north of Eglinton Avenue is because of Highland Creek and is occupied by McCowan Park and John McCrae Public School. Through traffic is carried by Danforth Road for a greater distance, about 1,750 metres (1.75 km; 5,740 ft), between a point 325 metres (1,066 ft) south of Lawrence Avenue and Eglinton Avenue. When the Scarborough Town Centre complex was opened in 1973, an interchange with Highway 401 was constructed. The Line 3 Scarborough rapid transit line, which opened in 1985, but closed in 2023, crosses McCowan on an elevated guideway at the complex. North of Sheppard Avenue, the Canadian Pacific Railway Toronto marshalling yards extend to McCowan at the west, and stretch east of Markham Road.

=== Meadowvale Road ===
Meadowvale Road
- Location: Lawrence Avenue East – Plug Hat Road

Meadowvale Road is primarily a residential route in Scarborough. It is the site of the Toronto Zoo north of Sheppard Avenue. North of the zoo, Meadowvale Road crosses through Toronto's only rural region, which includes farmland, large section of plain fields, forests, and wildlife.

=== Middlefield Road ===
Middlefield Road
- Location: McCowan Road – Steeles Avenue (continues north into Markham)

The concession occupied by Bellamy Road is interrupted by Highway 401 and the CP Agincourt Marshalling Yard. Streets such as Havenview Road (Sheppard Avenue East to Invergordon Avenue) and Shorting Road (north of Nugget Avenue at CPR Agincourt Yard to Sheppard Avenue East) form a part of the original alignment; however, they themselves are also discontinuous. The concession resumes south of Finch Avenue as Middlefield Road turning west to avoid the railyard towards McCowan Road where it continues as Huntingwood Drive west to Victoria Park Avenue. The CPR Yard built from 1959 to 1964 has permanently ended any connecting of Bellamy Road with Middlefield Road. Middlefield continues north from Steeles into Markham terminating at 14th Avenue.

=== Midland Avenue ===
Midland Avenue
- Location: Lake Ontario – Steeles Avenue East (continues several metres north into Markham)

Looking north on Midland from Eglinton

Midland Avenue was known as Church Street until 1882, when it was renamed for the Midland Railway Company in 1882. Only two years later, the Midland Railway would be purchased by the Grand Trunk Railway

Schools serve in the area are John A. Leslie Jr. Public School, Scarborough Centre for Alternative Studies (formerly Midland Avenue Collegiate Institute), St. Joan of Arc Catholic Academy (formerly Tabor Park Vocational School), St. Albert Catholic School, Bendale Business and Technical Institute, Agincourt Collegiate Institute, and Monsignor Fraser College Midland Campus (formerly Our Lady of Good Counsel Catholic School).

North of Steeles, Midland now ends in a cul-de-sac next to the former Miliken Public School, but the City of Markham has already planned a short extension of the road in a northwest direction (requiring the expropriation of properties along the proposed extension) to Old Kennedy Road at Sunrise Drive to provide improve traffic flow and future re-development of the area.

=== Morningside Avenue ===
Morningside Avenue
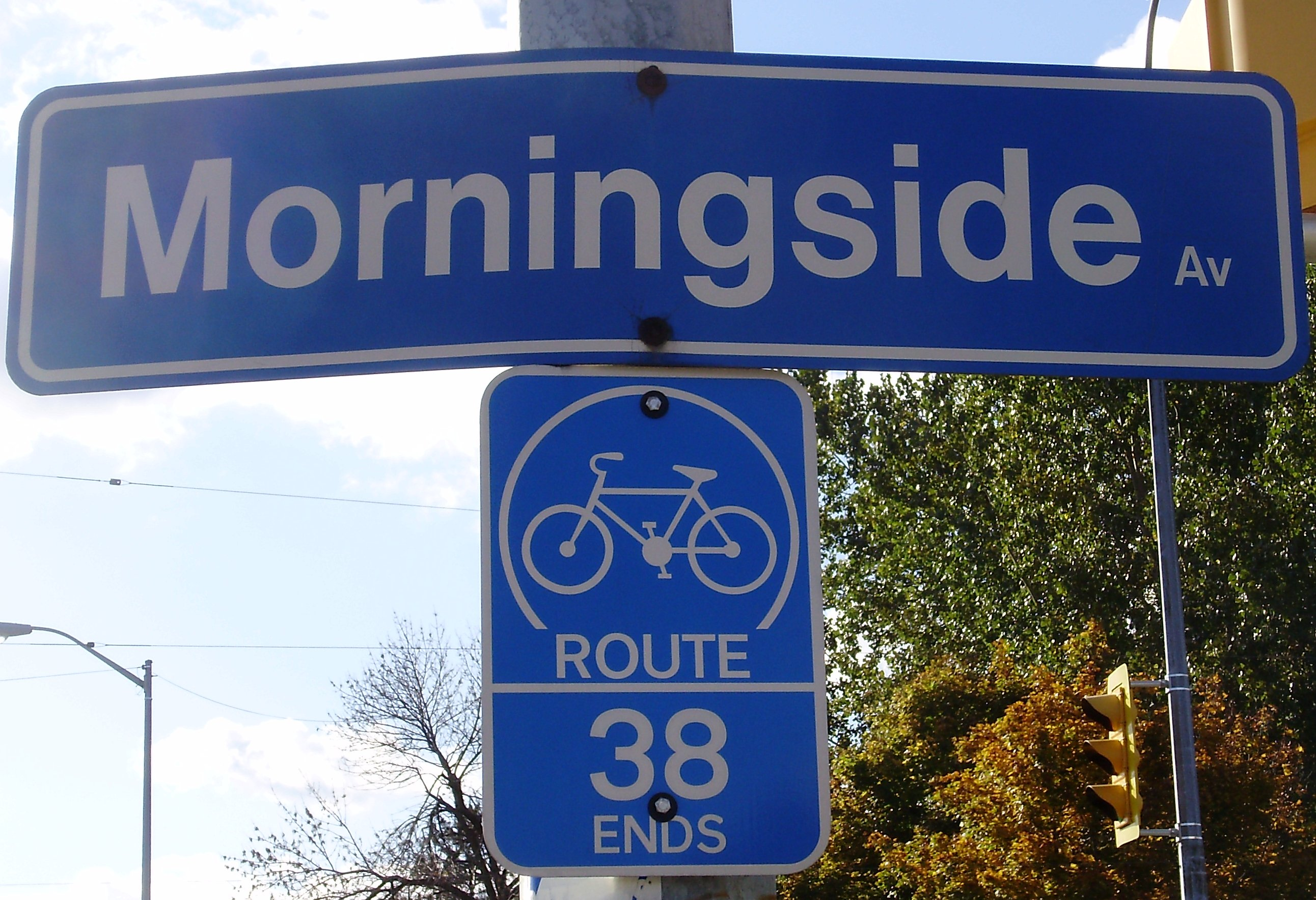
- Location: Guildwood Parkway - McNicoll Avenue ()

Morningside Avenue is a suburban arterial road within Scarborough. It runs north from Scarborough Bluffs overlooking Lake Ontario to McNicoll Avenue near the Rouge River valley.

=== Morrish Road ===
Morrish Road
- Location: Kingston Road - Highway 401 ()

Morrish Road is a residential street that is about 2 km long. The southernmost part intersects with Kingston Road while the northernmost part is cut off by Highway 401. Morrish Road is likely linked to William D. Morrish (1886–1939), who operated the William D. Morrish General Store at Morrish Road and Kingston Road. Morrish is the father of former Toronto City Councillor Ken Morrish.

=== Mount Pleasant Road ===
Mount Pleasant Road
- Location: Charles Street – Doncliffe Drive (continues south as Jarvis Street)

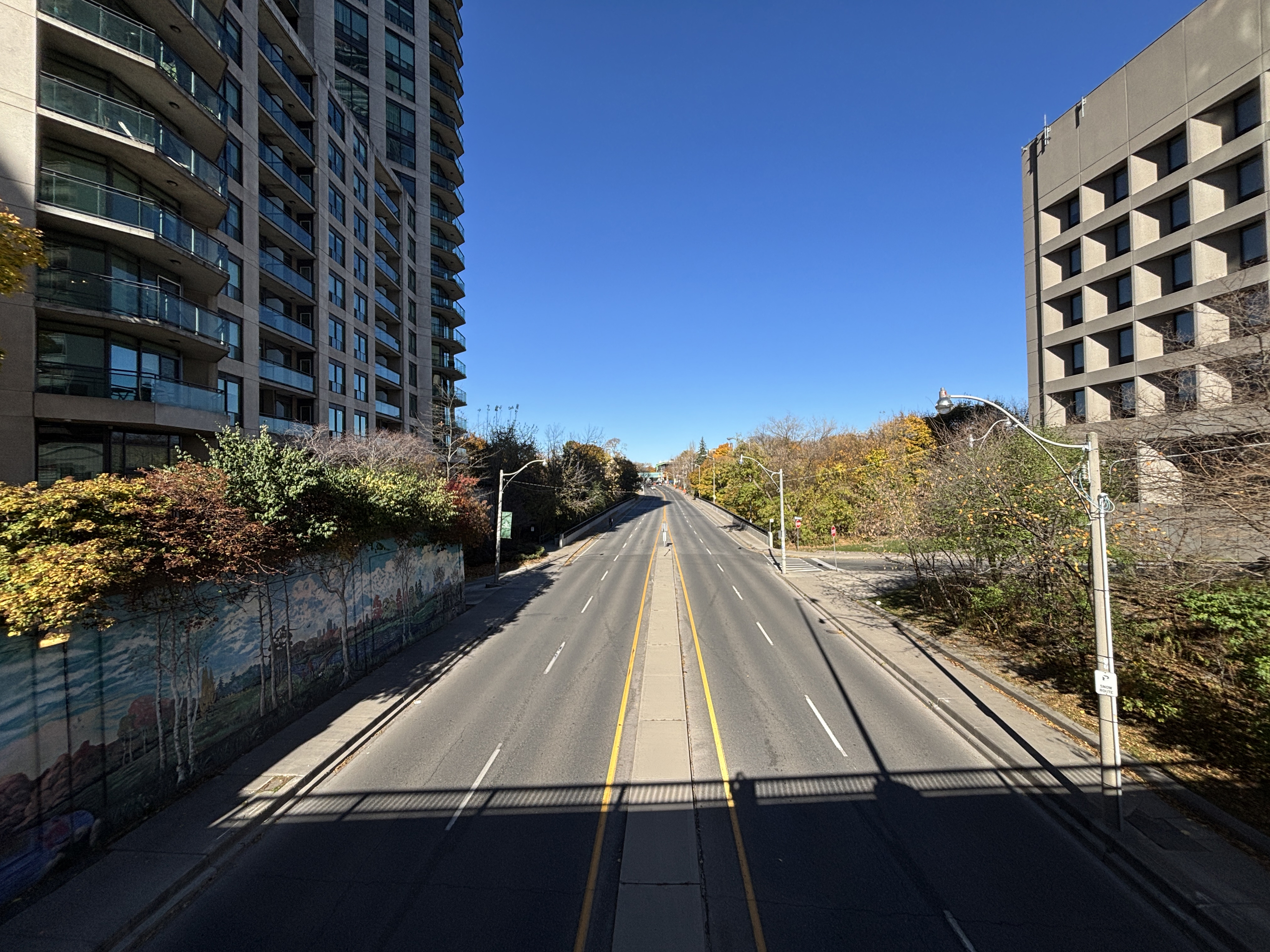
Mount Pleasant Road view from Bloor Street East

Mount Pleasant Road was named after the cemetery which it passes through when it was constructed in the late 1910s. The road follows the course of several earlier streets, many of which it assumed, including Kinsman Avenue (1918), Sidmouth Avenue (1920) and Hilda Avenue (1935). In the late 1940s, Mount Pleasant Road was extended south to its current terminus. This was initially referred to as the Clifton Road Extension, and is considered Toronto's first expressway.

Mount Pleasant Road begins at the northern terminus of Jarvis Street, one block south of Bloor Street East. It passes through the communities of Rosedale, Moore Park and Lawrence Park and crosses the Rosedale Ravine, Yellow Creek and Blythwood Ravine. The road ends near the Doncrest bus loop at Glen Echo Drive.

=== Neilson Road ===
Neilson Road
- Location: Rouge Valley Centenary – Oasis Road

Neilson Road was likely named for the settler Alexander Neilson, who arrived in Scarborough in 1824. Neilson is a brother to a prominent farming family that was located west of McCowan Road, north of Kingston Rd. that lived in a house called “Maplehurst”, b.1899.

Before the development of Morningside Heights, Neilson Road ended on Passmore Avenue where sections of the route north of Finch have been broken off into the extension of Morningside Avenue, along with the parts exist today as Raponi Circle and Oasis Bouelvard.

=== Oakwood Avenue ===
Oakwood Avenue
- Location: Eglinton Avenue West - Davenport Road ()

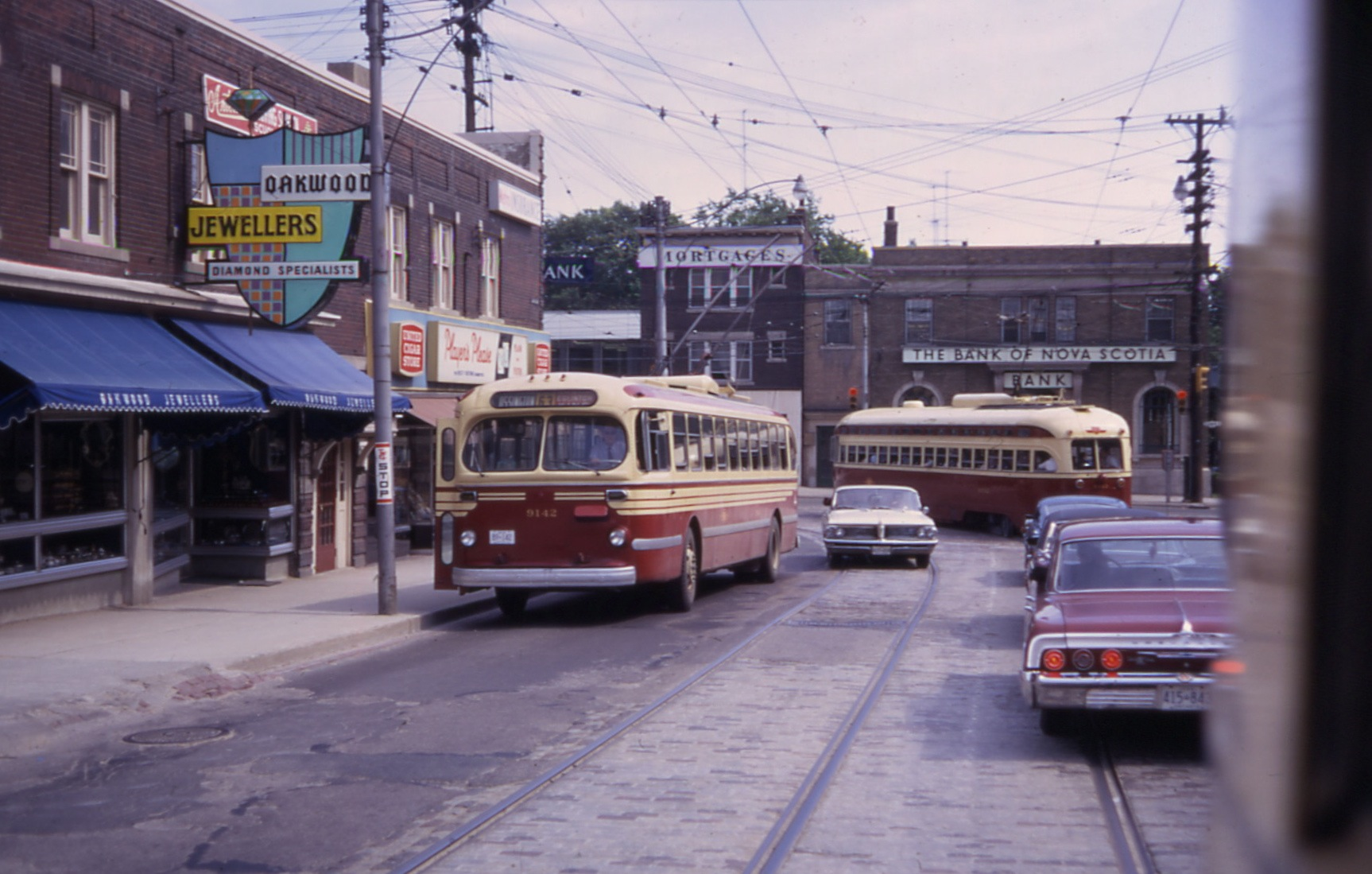
Looking south on Oakwood Avenue towards St. Clair, 1968

Oakwood Avenue is named for the settlement that grew just north of its intersection with St. Clair Avenue West. It goes through the neighbourhood of Oakwood Village.

=== Orton Park Road ===
Orton Park Road
- Location: Lawrence Avenue East – Ellesmere Road

Orton Park Road was named by Evelyn J. Lea and his wife, Constance Nicholson, after the Nicholson estate near Cumberland, England, which was also named Orton Park.

=== Ossington Avenue ===
Ossington Avenue
- Length: 3.5 km (2.2 mi)
- Location: Queen Street West – Davenport Road (Continues south as Lower Ossington Avenue)

Ossington Avenue is named for the estate of the Denison family in Nottinghamshire. John Denison moved to York and built Brookfield House at a corner on Dundas Street, which is now the intersection of Queen Street West and Ossington Avenue. Dundas Street then followed what is now Queen Street West and then Ossington Avenue, obstructed by the valley of Garrison Creek. Ossington Avenue was later built north from the present corner of Ossington and Dundas to Bloor Street West. The section between Bloor Street and Davenport Road was formerly known as Lancaster Road. South of Dundas, the street has become a popular destination for nightlife, and it is particularly popular amongst the hipster subculture.

=== Pape Avenue ===
Pape Avenue
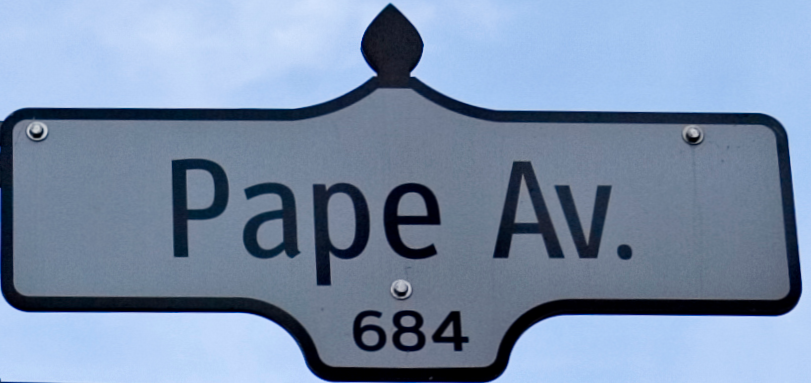
- Location: Millwood Road - Eastern Avenue (continues north of the Leslie Bridge and is renamed Millwood Road)

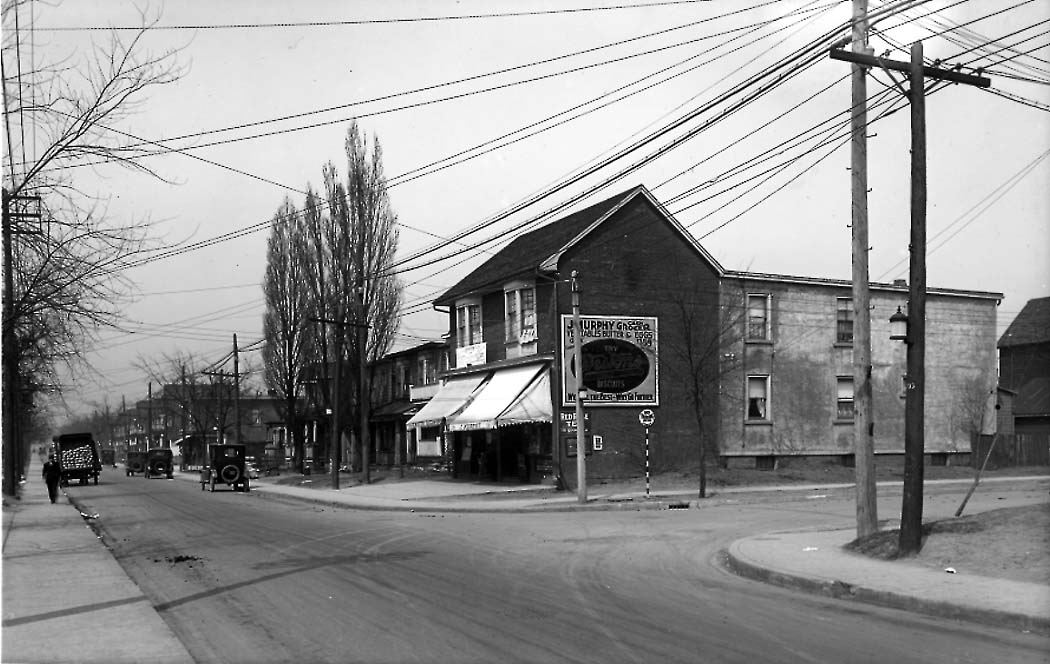
Looking north on Pape Avenue at Lipton Avenue, 1927

Pape Avenue is a road that begins at Eastern Avenue, and continues north to Gerrard Square, where it is interrupted by the rail corridor. It resumes on the opposite side of the rail lines and continues north, crossing Danforth Avenue and ending at an intersection with Donlands Avenue at the south side of the Leaside Bridge. This road has HOV lanes north of Danforth Avenue. It was named after Joseph Pape, a market gardener who emigrated to Canada from England in 1853. His son, James Pape, owned land south of Gerrard Street and what was then Robinson (now Pape), and was an alderman for St. Lawrence Ward.

=== Parkside Drive ===
Parkside Drive
- Location: Lake Shore Boulevard West – Bloor Street West (continues north as Keele Street)

Parkside Drive was a portion of Keele Street until 1921, when it was renamed by the City of Toronto. John Howard sold his estate to the city in 1873 to use as a public park.

Parkside Drive begins at Lake Shore Boulevard West. Passing beneath the Gardiner Expressway and The Queensway, the road travels north alongside High Park, which lies to the west. At Bloor Street West, Parkside Drive becomes Keele Street. The entirety of the road is residential, with houses to the east side of the road.

Residents have raised concerns about speeding motorists on the street, especially after a fatal crash killed two, near The Queensway. In response, the city has reduced the speed limit, added two traffic lights and a speed camera. The City further intends to reduce through traffic to two lanes and add a cycling lane.

=== Parliament Street ===
Parliament Street
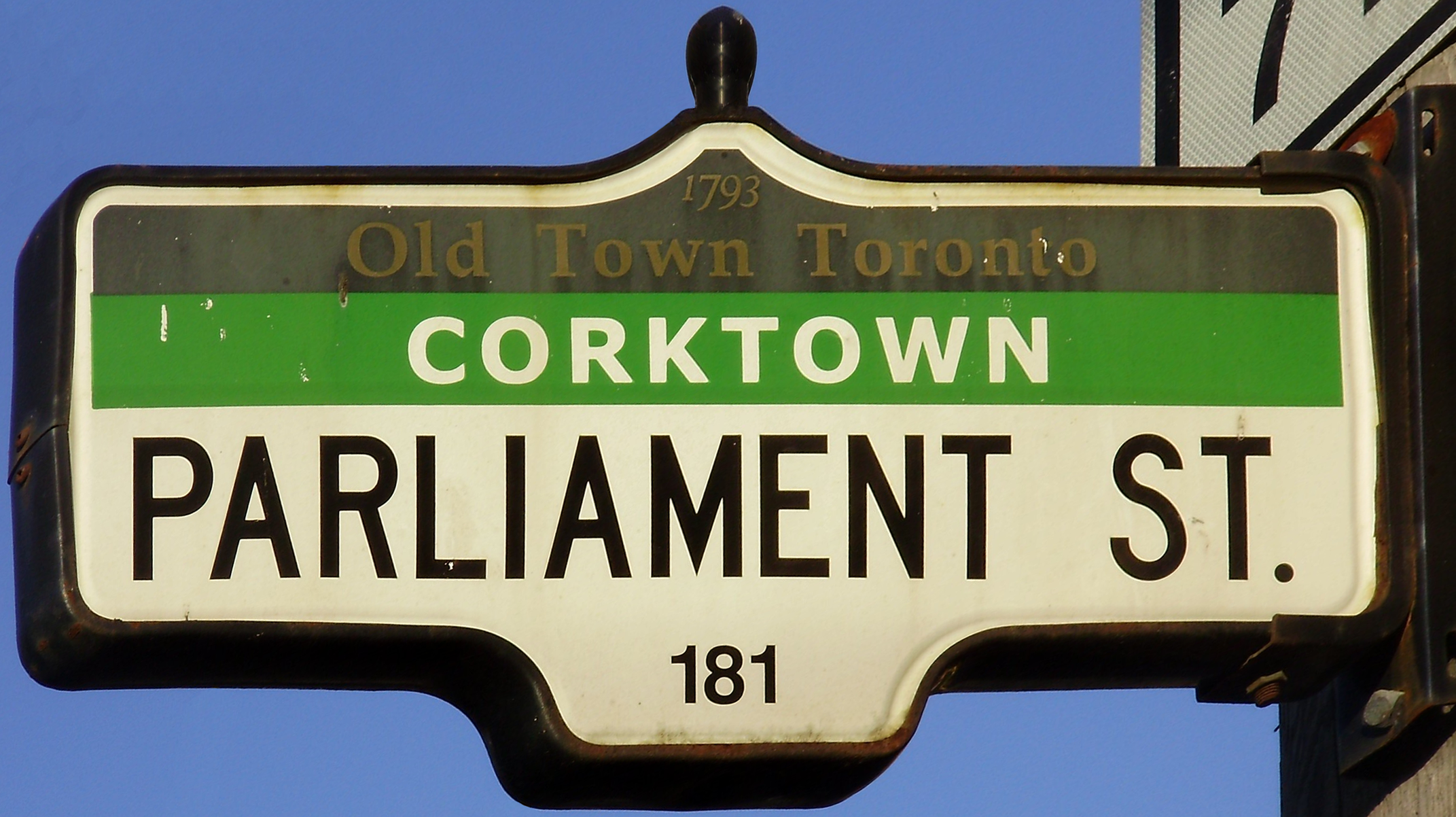
- Location: Queens Quay East – Bloor Street East (continues south as Queen's Quay)

Parliament Street was the site of the original Parliament Buildings of Upper Canada, constructed on Front Street between Berkeley and Parliament by 1797 under the orders of John Graves Simcoe. The buildings, planned as one building with two wings, were not completed and in 1813 were destroyed by the invading American army. Parliament Street begins at Lake Shore Boulevard East, where it continues southwest as Queen's Quay, and travels north along the eastern outskirts of downtown Toronto. The road ends at Bloor Street East between the Rosedale and Sherbourne phases of the Prince Edward Viaduct. Prior to the construction of the viaduct, Parliament Street ended at Hayter Street.

=== Pharmacy Avenue ===
Pharmacy Avenue
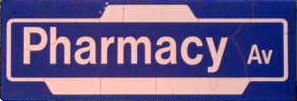
- Location: Danforth Avenue – Steeles Avenue East (continues north to Markham as Esna Park Drive and Rodick Road)

Pharmacy Avenue likely takes its name from a local pharmacy, beyond which no information is available. The road is cut off at Ontario Highway 401 in the 1950s but as a sideroad for farms the roadway was connected.

North of Steeles in Markham, the road becomes Esna Park Drive, then the road turns and runs west at Alden Road until meeting Woodbine Ave, after which it becomes John Street. After its turn west, when continuing north it becomes Rodick Road, which it continues as until after 16th Avenue where it turns west and ends on Woodbine Avenue.

=== Port Union Road ===
Port Union Road
- Location: Lake Ontario – Kingston Road (continues northwest as Sheppard Avenue East)

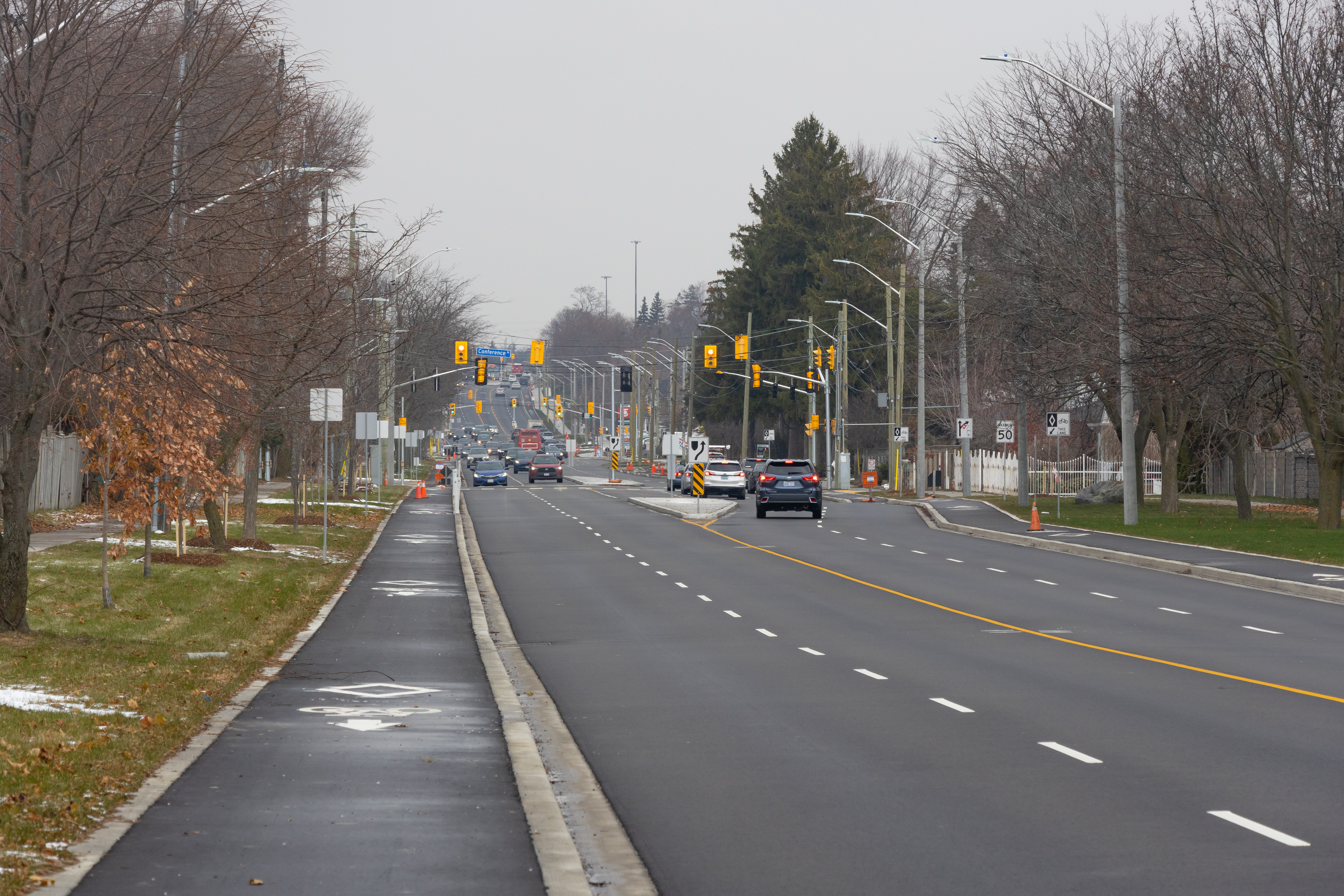
Looking north along Port Union Road, 2025

Port Union Road is a residential artery that carries traffic from Sheppard Avenue East at Kingston Road southwards to south of Lawrence Avenue East into Port Union Waterfront Park. It was named after the Port Union neighbourhood, which was originally a hamlet within Pickering until 1974.

=== Queen's Park ===
Queen's Park
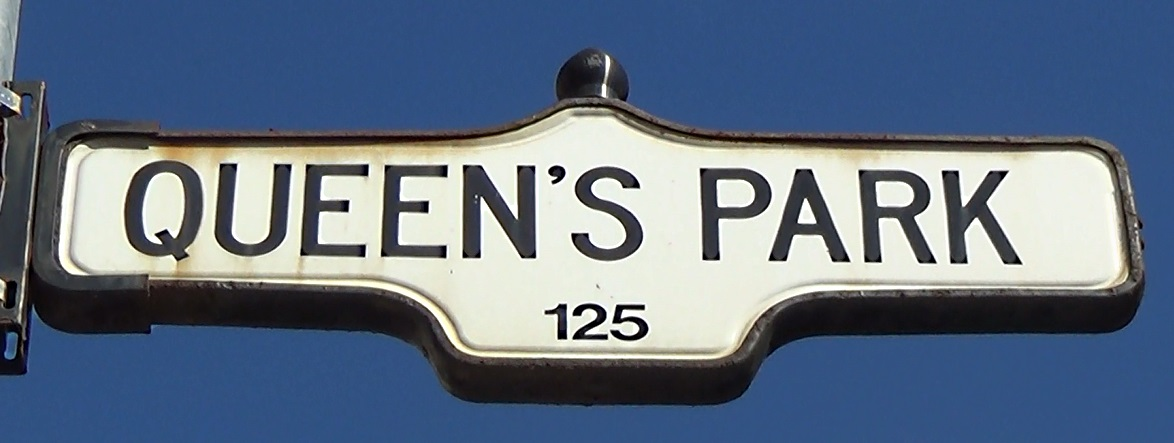
- Location: Queen's Park Crescent – Bloor Street (continues south as Queen's Park Cres.; north as Avenue Road)

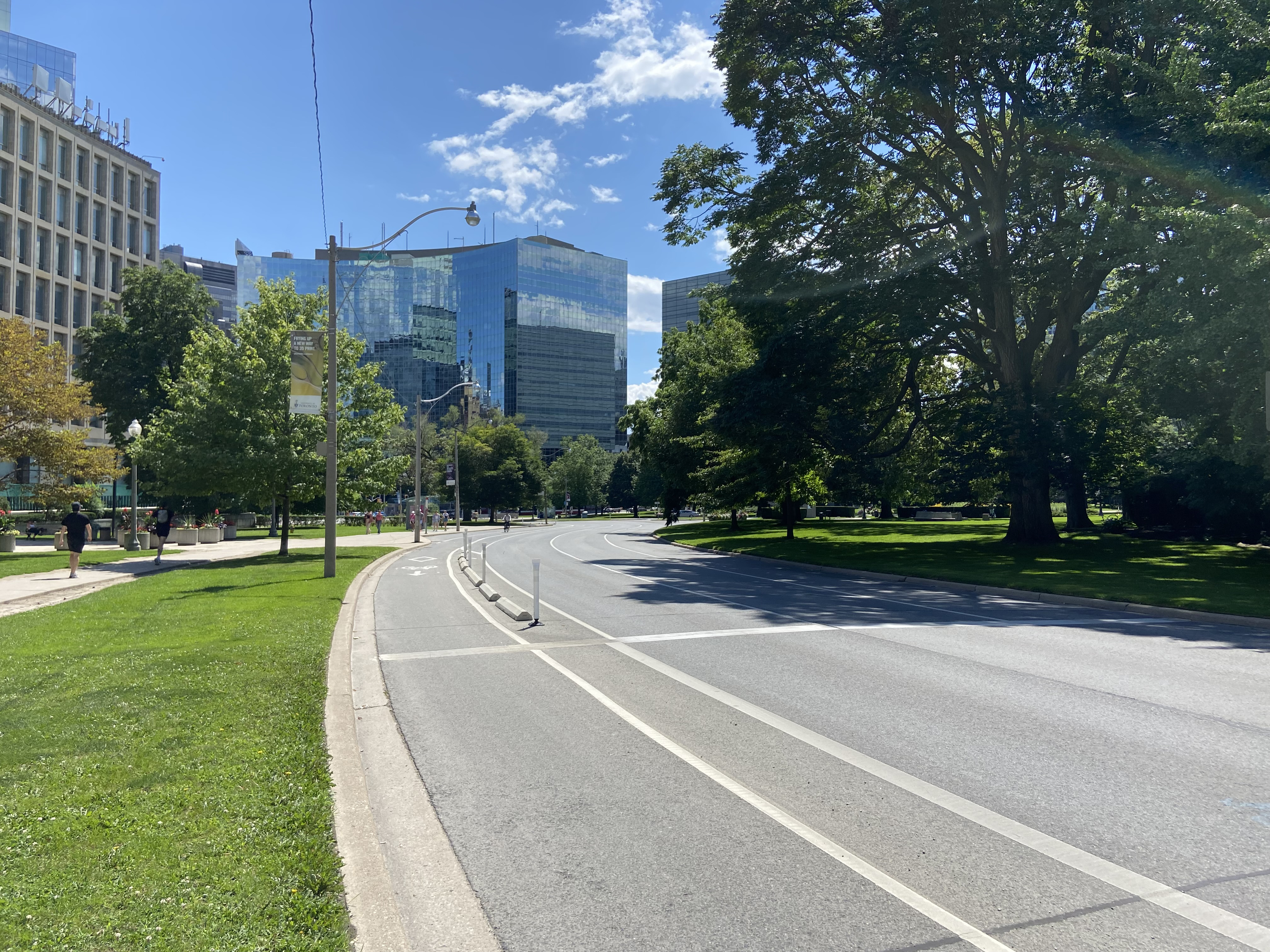
Queen's Park Crescent East

Queen's Park is a very short but important arterial street forming the link between University Avenue and Avenue Road. The street begins at the northern convergence of the east and west arms of Queen's Park Crescent, which together form two one-way streets around the namesake Queen's Park, and the Ontario Legislative Building. (The street known as "Queen's Park" is therefore actually just to the north of the physical area called Queen's Park.) The Royal Ontario Museum is located on the street. Note that the street is known simply as "Queen's Park", and has no suffix as part of its official name.

=== Reesor Road ===
Reesor Road
- Location: Old Finch Avenue – Steeles Avenue East (continues north into Markham)

Reesor Road is a small single lane road that travels north from Old Finch Avenue on the north end of Toronto Zoo north into farmland, woodlots, private homes and parts of Rouge National Urban Park to Steeles Avenue East. The road was created from earlier surveys of Scarborough with the remaining sections south of Old Finch assumed by Morrish Road and Dean Park Road. Road continues north of Steeles as an arterial road to 19th Avenue before becoming Tenth Line to merging with York-Durham Line south of Bloomington Road. Reesor Road in Markham is a municipal road maintained by the City of Markham (and Town of Whitchurch-Stouffville as Tenth Line) and not a York Regional Road. Reesor Road is named after the Reesor family that settled and farmed the area along the road in Scarborough and Markham. Thomas Reesor, son of Christian Reesor and Esther Hoover was born in Scarborough and became involved in settling Russian Mennonites in Manitoba and in Reesor, Ontario near Cochrane.

=== Renforth Drive ===
Renforth Drive
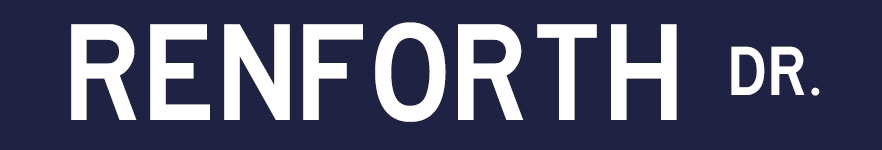
- Location: Bloor Street West – Carlingview Drive (continuing as International Blvd.)

Renforth Drive name's origin is unknown, but was part of the Fourth Concession that now also includes parts of Carlingview Drive and Humberline Drive. Most of the road near Highway 401 incorporates the southern terminus of the former Indian Line and forms a short section of the boundary with Mississauga.

=== Roncesvalles Avenue ===
Roncesvalles Avenue
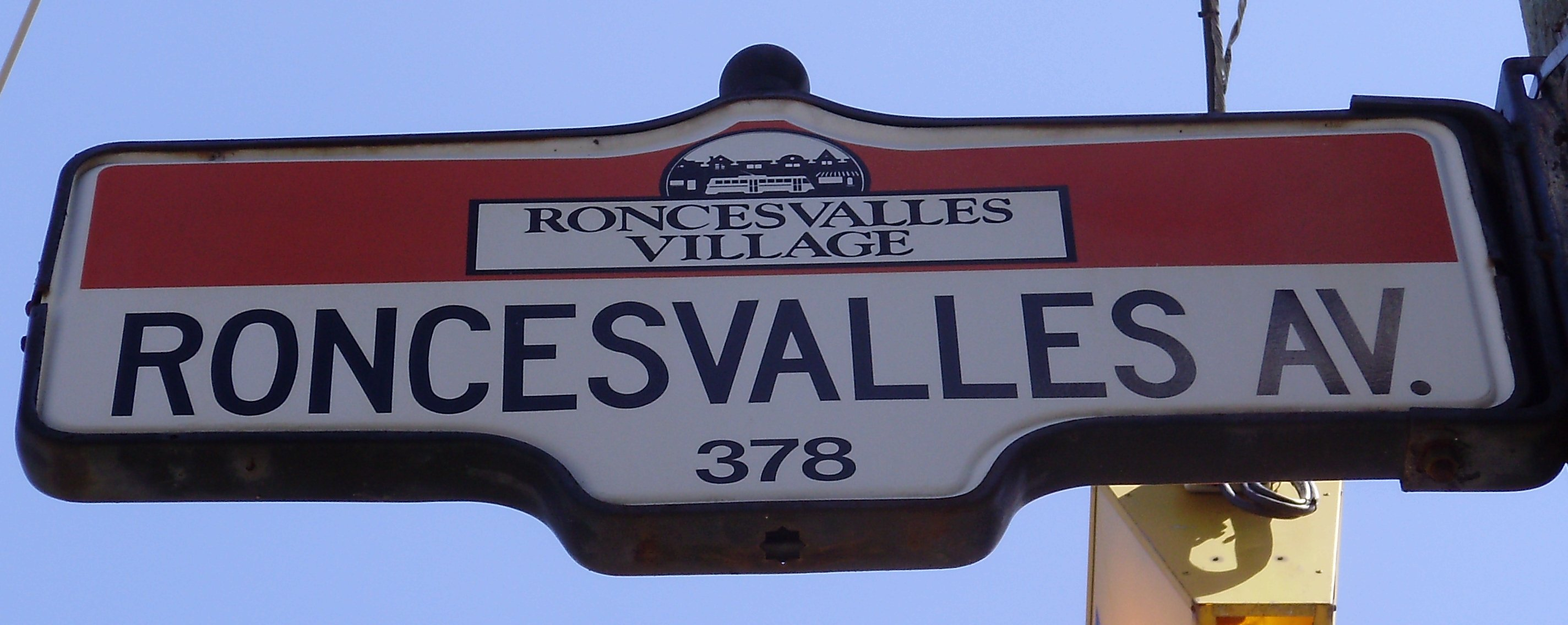
- Length: 1.8 km (1.1 mi)
- Location: The Queensway / Queen Street – Dundas Street West (continues north as Dundas Street south as King Street)

Roncesvalles Avenue was named by or in honour of Colonel Walter O'Hara, who fought in the Peninsular War and owned large land grants that were eventually subdivided to form Parkdale. The name originates from a village in northern Spain near the border with France, where O'Hara fought a battle against Napoleon I. Roncesvalles begins at an intersection with The Queensway, Queen Street and King Street and travels north to Dundas Street West.

=== Royal York Road ===
Royal York Road
- Location: South of Lake Shore Boulevard West – Dixon Road (continues north as St. Phillips Road)

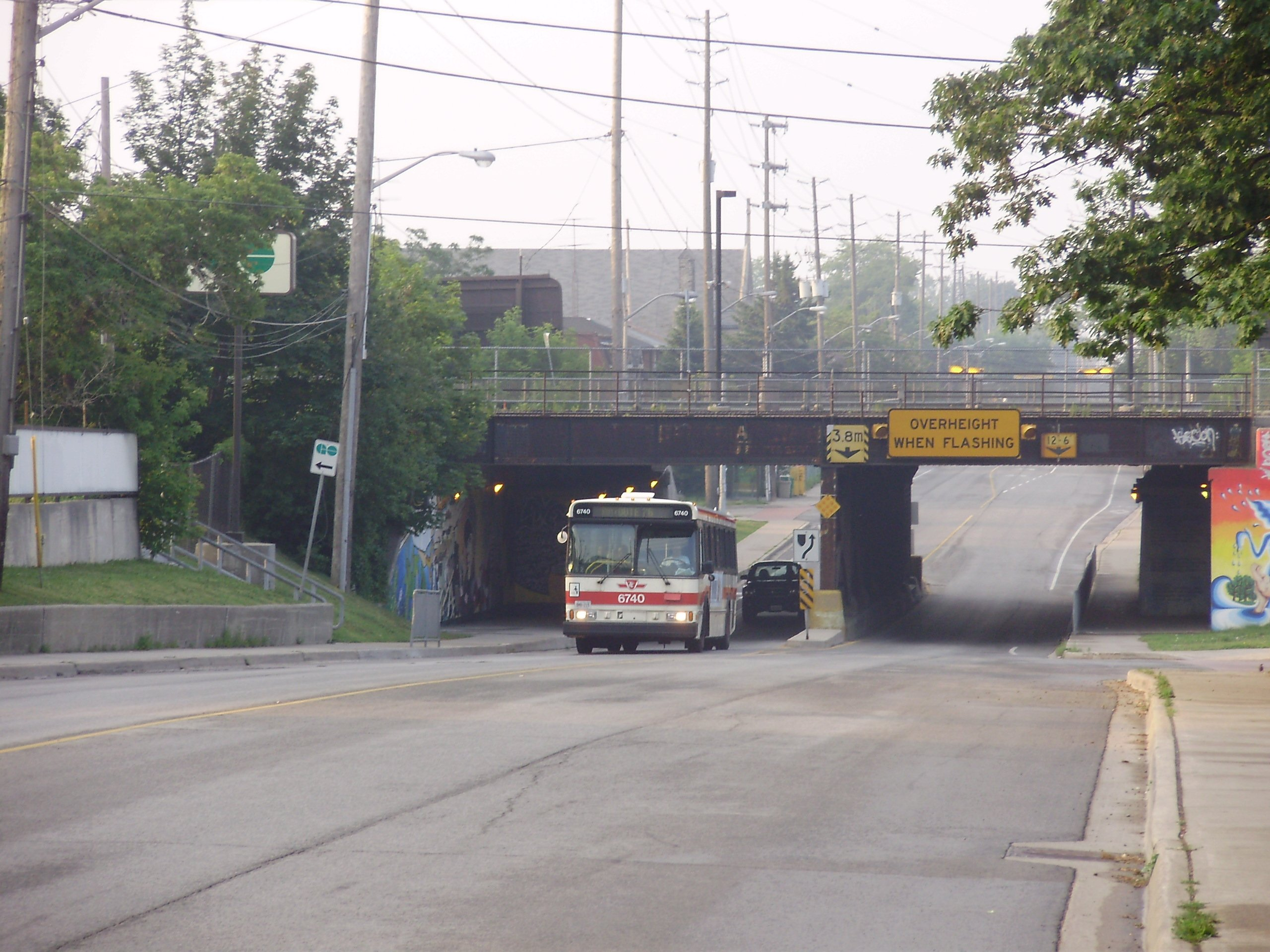
Looking south on Royal York Road from Judson St. The view of the CNR bridge was over Church Street which ended at Lakeshore Road, and was later changed to Royal York Road. Judson Rd. was previously named Main Street.

Royal York Road was named for the original destination of the drive, which was the Royal York Golf Course, now St. George's. The course was built as an added attraction for the hotel guests. The entrance to the club was changed to Islington Avenue after the Royal York Hotel sold the course.

=== Runnymede Road ===
Runnymede Road
- Location: North of St. Clair Avenue West - Morningside Avenue (Continues north to Gaffney Park Trail)

Runnymede Road is named for the house of John Scarlett, built at the corner of Dundas and Keele in 1838. Runnymede is a field in England, southwest of London, where the Magna Carta was signed in 1215.

=== Scarborough Golf Club Road ===
Scarborough Golf Club Road
- Location: Hill Crescent – Ellesmere Road

Scarborough Golf Club Road was named after the Scarboro Golf and Country Club (established in 1912), though the road's name reflects the full spelling of the former city's name. The club is located along the Highland Creek valley astride the road. Scarborough Golf Club Road begins at Hill Crescent and travels north to Ellesmere Road.

=== Scarborough-Pickering Townline ===
Scarborough-Pickering Townline
- Maintained by: City of Pickering
- Length: 2.7 km (1.7 mi)
- Location: Steeles Avenue East – Finch Avenue East

Scarborough-Pickering Townline, also known as Toronto-Pickering Townline, serves as one of the eastern boundaries between Toronto and Pickering. The road is managed by the City of Pickering and not the City of Toronto. The road is a still a rural route for local traffic (mostly farms) due to the shortness of the road. The entire length is single lane in each direction with no curbs and unpaved shoulders. The only traffic light is found at the junction with Steeles Avenue East and Taunton Road and stop signs at Finch Avenue East; these are the only controlled intersections on the length of the road. Toronto-Pickering Townline continues north of Steeles as York-Durham Line (York Regional Road 30 / Durham Regional Road 30). The unassumed road clearance south of Finch Avenue connects with Port Union Road at Island Road (rest of road north bends north of Highway 401 to meet with Sheppard Avenue was built outside of original road survey).

=== Scarlett Road ===
Scarlett Road
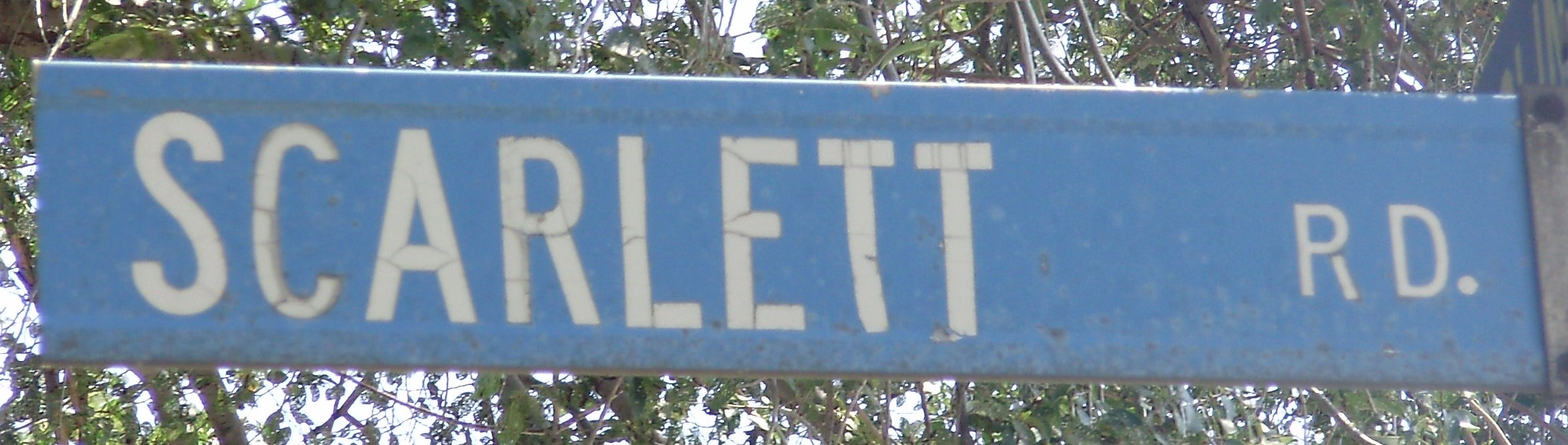
- Location: Dundas Street West – north of Lawrence Avenue West (continues west as Dixon Road)

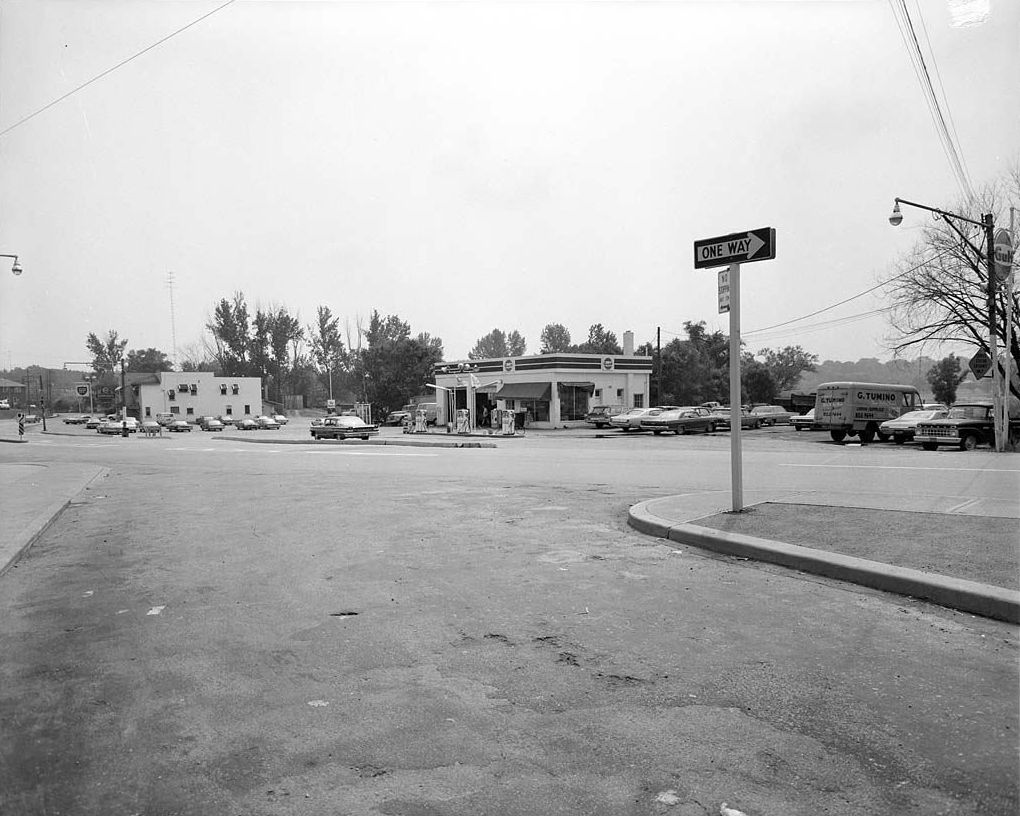
Looking south on Scarlett Road from Old Scarlett Road, 1970

Scarlett Road is named for John Scarlett, who moved to Upper Canada in 1808 and owned several square kilometres of property northwest of Bloor and Keele Streets. "Scarlett's Road" was opened along the route of the Toronto Carrying-Place Trail north of his property. The road begins at Dundas Street West immediately south of the CPR crosstown rail line. It connects with the western terminus of St. Clair Avenue, then progresses north alongside the Humber River to north of Lawrence Avenue West, where it curves to the west and becomes Dixon Road.

=== Sewells Road ===
Sewells Road
- Location: Old Finch Avenue - Steeles Avenue East

Sewells Road is a small single-lane road that travels north from Old Finch Avenue through farmland, woodlots and private homes to Steeles Avenue East. The street is named for Joseph Sewell (1785–1870), an early pioneer in the Hillside area of Scarborough.

=== Sherbourne Street ===
Sherbourne Street
- Location: Front Street – Bloor Street East (Continues north of Bloor Street West as Sherbourne Street North to South Drive.)

Sherbourne Street was named by Samuel Ridout in 1845 after the town in Dorset, England; the Ridout family emigrated from Sherborne. Sherbourne has Cycle tracks on the south side of Bloor Street West to Front Street West, and has bike lanes between Bloor Street West and Elm street.

=== Spadina Avenue/Spadina Road ===
Spadina Avenue Spadina Road
- Location: Queens Quay West - Bloor Street (Spadina Avenue); Bloor Street - Davenport Road, Austin Terrace - Eglinton Avenue West, Chaplin Crescent - New Haven Drive (Spadina Road)

Spadina Avenue, and its extension north of Bloor Street, Spadina Road, originally pronounced "spa-dee-nuh", are named after the estate of Dr. William Baldwin. After a fire and two complete reconstructions, this estate has since become the Spadina House. The Baldwins held many important positions in the early government of York, having several streets named after them (including Baldwin Street). William planned Spadina Avenue as the driveway to his new estate in 1818, and laid the street in 1836 with the unusual width of two chains (132 feet), double the width of any street laid to that date. It was eventually extended north and over the Nordheimer Ravine to the village of Forest Hill, and thereafter to Eglinton Avenue. Its southern terminus is at the edge of Lake Ontario.

Spadina has been transformed many times, once almost to a depressed expressway known as the Spadina Expressway, which was cancelled by Ontario Premier Bill Davis in 1971 after extensive protesting. Casa Loma was built next to the Spadina House in the early 20th century.

=== St. George Street ===
St. George Street
- Location: College Street – Dupont Street (continues south as Beverley Street)

St. George Street is named after local resident Quetton St. George. This street passes through the University of Toronto's St. George campus, which is named for the street.

=== University Avenue ===
University Avenue
- Location: Front Street – College Street (continues north as Queen's Park Crescent)

University Avenue shares its origins with College Street as one of the two private entrances to King's College (now the University of Toronto) opened in 1829. King's College was chartered by Henry Bathurst, 3rd Earl Bathurst two years earlier. Both roads were known as College Avenue. In an attempt to create a stately elegant driveway to the college, the road was cut 120 feet wide and lined with chestnut trees and ornamental fences. A gatehouse designed by John Howard sat at the entranceway at present-day Queen and University. The road quickly became an obstacle to the growing city, and the gates surrounding it were torn down in 1859.

As part of a depression relief program, university was extended south of Queen Street to meet York Street at Front beginning in 1929.

=== Victoria Park Avenue ===
Victoria Park Avenue
- Location: Queen Street East – Steeles Avenue East (continues north into Markham)

Victoria Park Avenue was named after a park which once ran alongside the road. The park was named in honour of Queen Victoria. Until the 1960s, Victoria Park Avenue only extended as far north as Danforth Avenue; the swamps of Taylor-Massey Creek blocked further progress until they were drained during the construction of Line 2 Bloor–Danforth. The road north of St. Clair Avenue formed part of Dawes Road until then. Victoria Park Avenue begins at Queen Street East, north of the R. C. Harris Water Treatment Plant. It climbs the western edge of the Scarborough Bluffs and travels through a residential neighbourhood to Gerrard. North of Gerrard, the density of the surrounding development increases; though detached homes exist throughout the length of the road, businesses and apartment blocks are far more common. Victoria Park ends north of Steeles Avenue East at Denison Avenue in Markham.

=== Warden Avenue ===
Warden Avenue
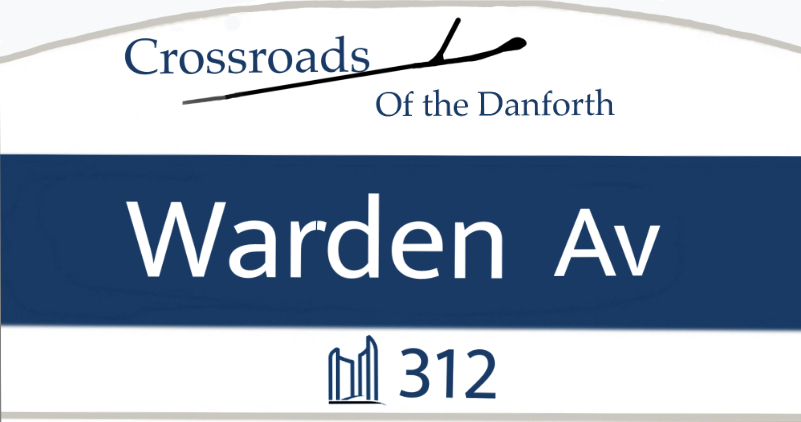
- Location: Lake Ontario – Steeles Avenue East (continues north into Markham)

Warden Avenue, formerly Wardin Avenue, is an arterial road in Scarborough. The original spelling of Wardin refers to the Wardin Park subdivision built in 1912 Scarborough. Warden begins south of Kingston Road at the former Toronto Hunt Club and travels north to Steeles Avenue East, where it continues into Markham as York Regional Road 65. Before renaming, it was signed as 5th Line in Markham. Although the section south of Danforth Avenue is mostly detached residential housing, the majority of Warden Avenue north of Danforth is industrial or commercial.

=== Weston Road ===
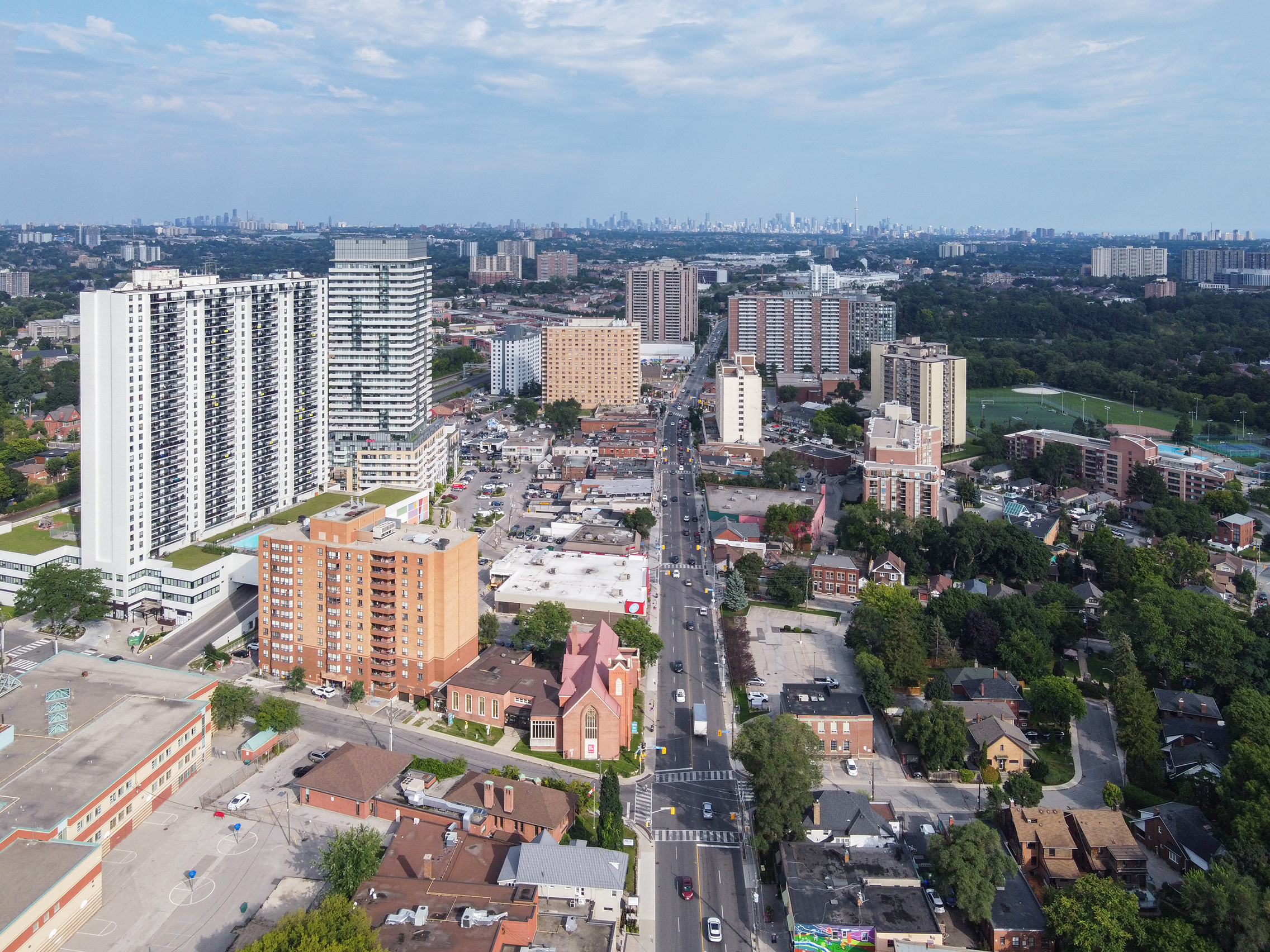
Aerial view of Weston Road in 2024

Weston Road
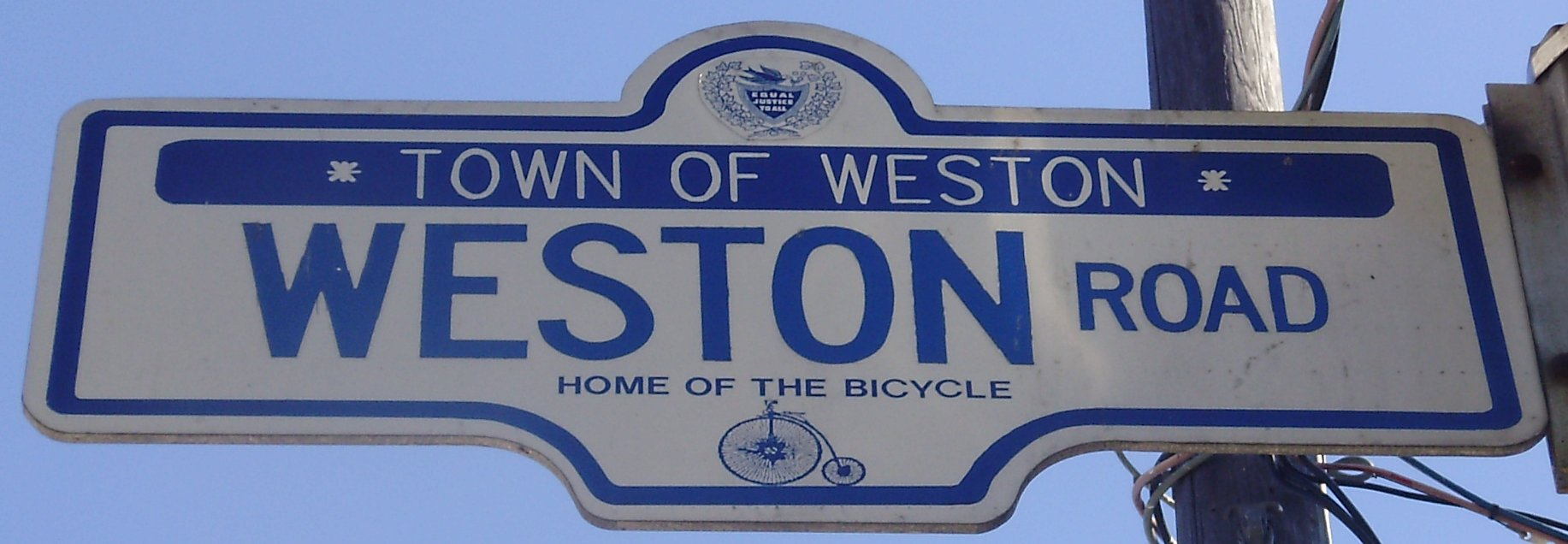
- Location: St. Clair Avenue West – Steeles Avenue West (continues south as Keele Street north into Vaughan)

Weston Road is a north–south route from St. Clair Street north-west to the north of Highway 401 where it then proceeds directly north into Vaughan. The road was first cleared in the early 1800s to connect Toronto to Weston, then further north-west. It was a toll road (the Weston Plank Road) from the 1840s. The village of Weston was built where the road met the Humber River and industry was built along the shores.

=== Willowdale Avenue ===
Willowdale Avenue
- Location: Glendora Avenue (interrupted by Wilket Creek) – Steeles Avenue East (continues into Markham)

Named for the area of Willowdale, Toronto, which was originally the postal village of Willow Dale. The area's name was provided by David Gibson, who was one of the original settlers in the area and influenced by Willow trees in the area when petitioning for the creation of the post village designation.

=== Woodbine Avenue ===
Woodbine Avenue
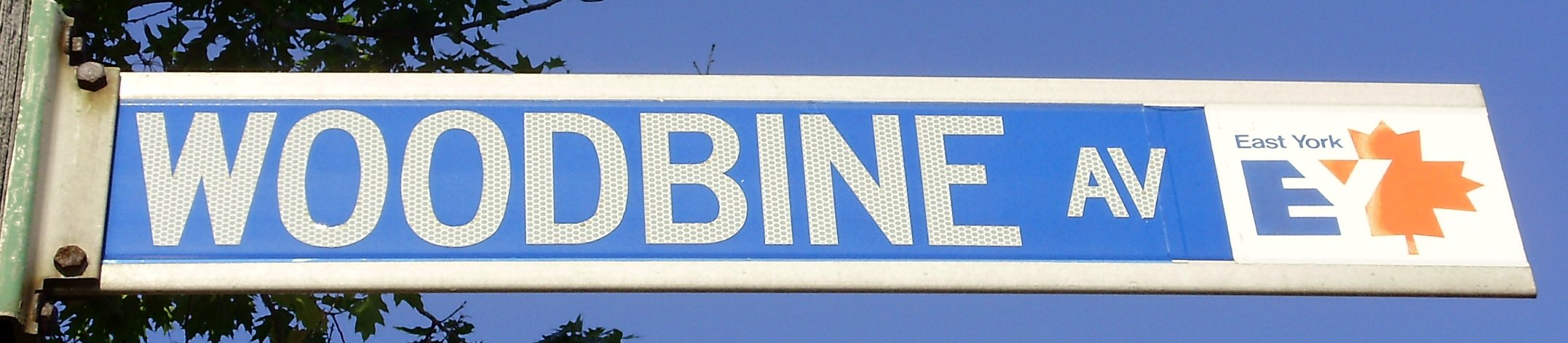
- Location: Lake Shore Boulevard East – O'Connor Drive (resumes north of Steeles Avenue in Markham)

Woodbine Avenue is an arterial road laid out in the 1830s at about the time Toronto was founded. It begins just north of Lake Ontario in the Beaches district of Toronto. It proceeds north ending at O'Connor Avenue at the Don River valley. Another section exists north of Toronto from Steeles Avenue into York Region. The Markham section was once referred to as Don Mills Road (not to confused with the road in Toronto) and 4th Concession Road. A section north of Lawrence Avenue to Steeles Avenue was built but replaced by the Don Valley Parkway and Ontario Highway 404. The original Woodbine Racetrack existed near its southern terminus for over a century and held numerous King's Plates until a new Woodbine track was built in Etobicoke. The track continued as Greenwood Raceway and eventually closed. William J. Howell, owner of the original track had a hotel, Woodbine House, on Yonge Street which was likely origin of the street's name. Part of the site of the old track is now today Woodbine Park, while another section is housing.

=== Yonge Street ===
Yonge Street
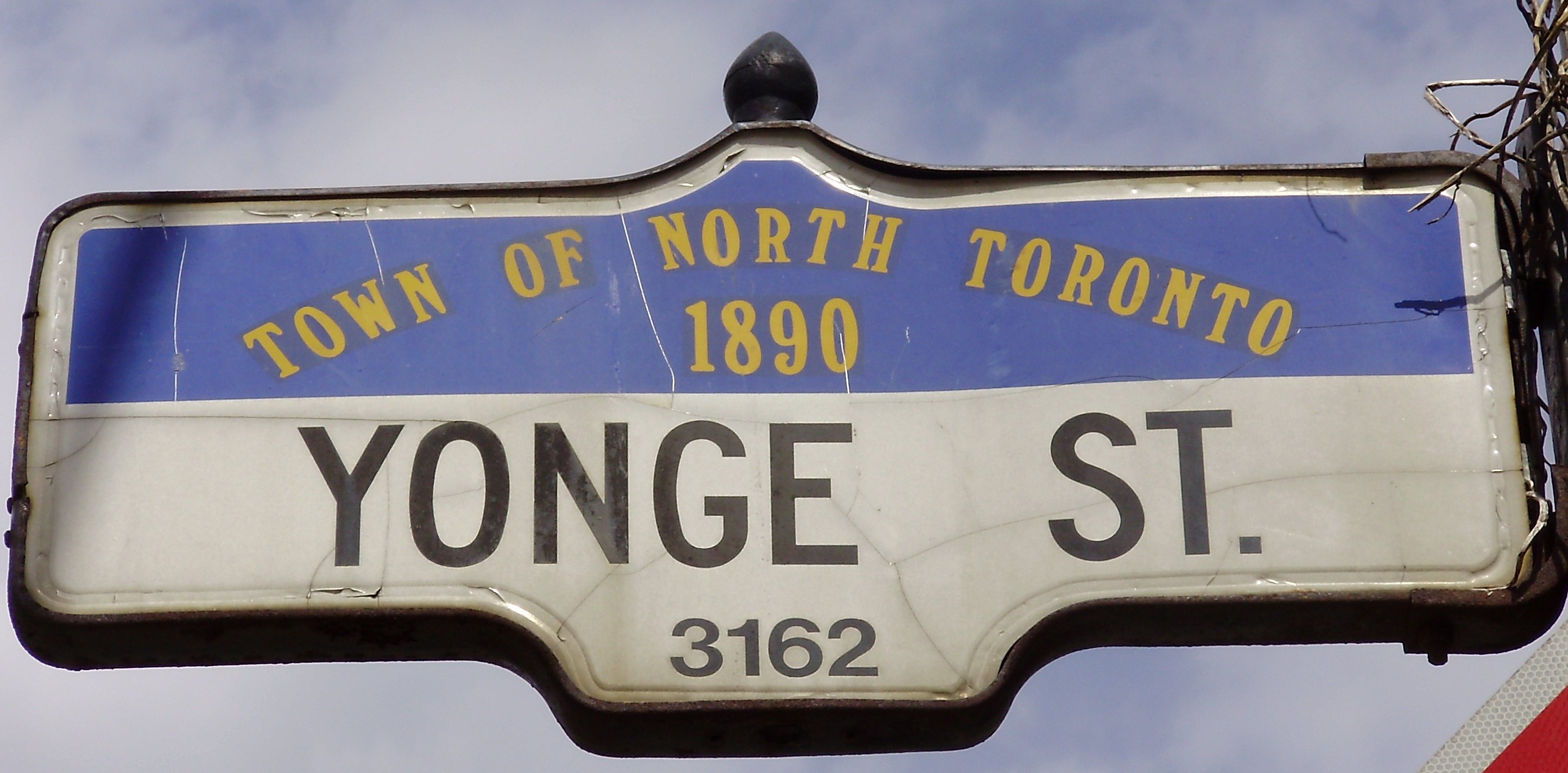
- Location: Queen's Quay – Steeles Avenue (continues north into Vaughan and Markham)

Governor John Graves Simcoe named the road Yonge Street, after Sir George Yonge, secretary of war in the British Cabinet and a family friend.

North of Steeles Avenue, Yonge continues through York Region, as the border of Markham and Vaughan south of Highway 407, and the primary road through Richmond Hill. It then continues through Aurora and Newmarket, before spurring off of the former stretch of Highway 11 and eventually breaking in the Holland Marsh just north of Queensville Sideroad. Yonge Street then starts up again at the intersection with an unnamed road and then continues north to Ravenshoe Road, just west of Keswick, where it finally ends.

== See also ==
- Lists of roads in Toronto
  - List of east–west roads in Toronto
  - List of contour roads in Toronto
  - List of notable streets in Toronto
