= North Toronto =

Coordinates: 43.711°N 79.389°W

- Neighbourhood
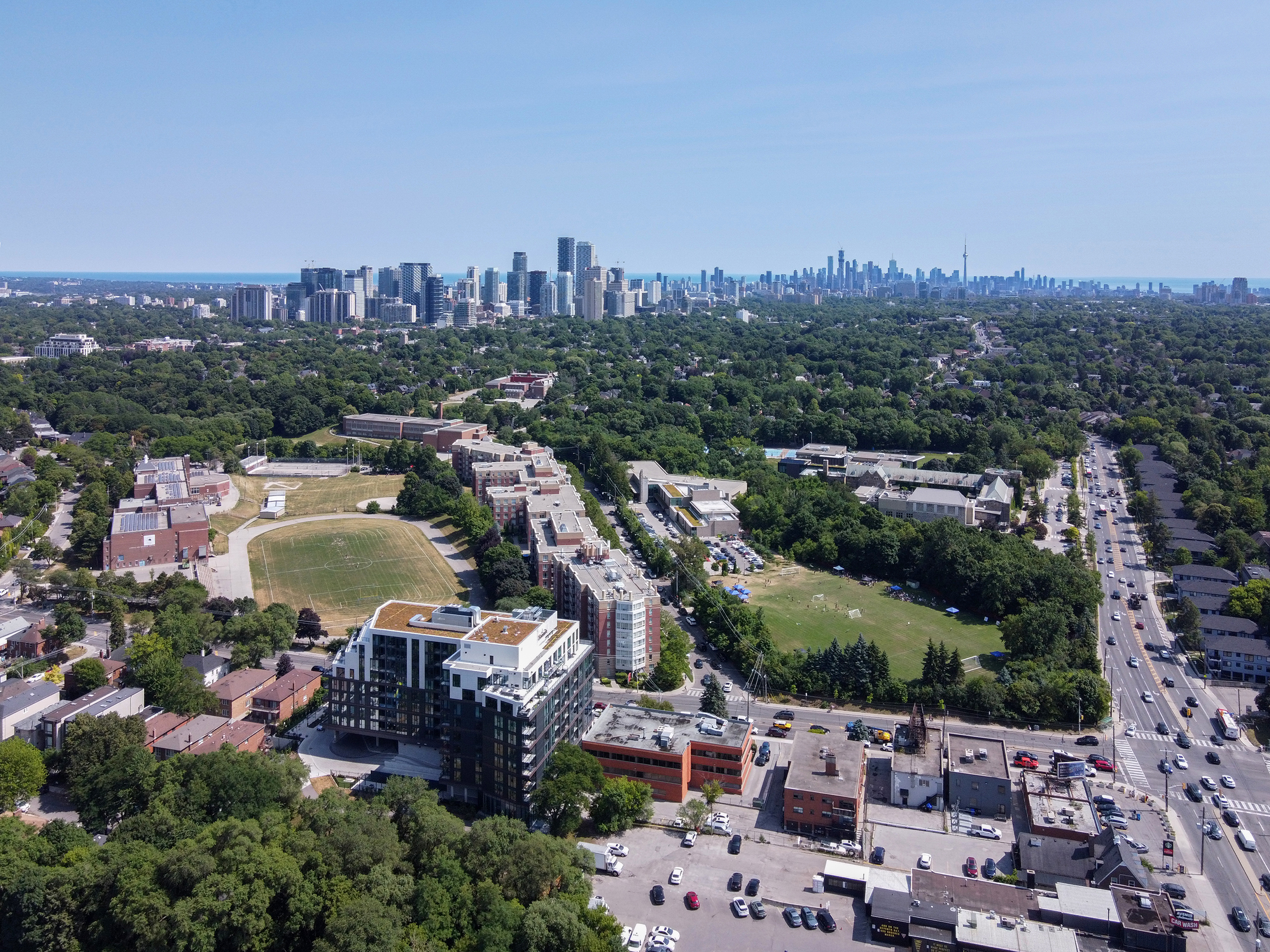
- View of Lytton Park in North Toronto

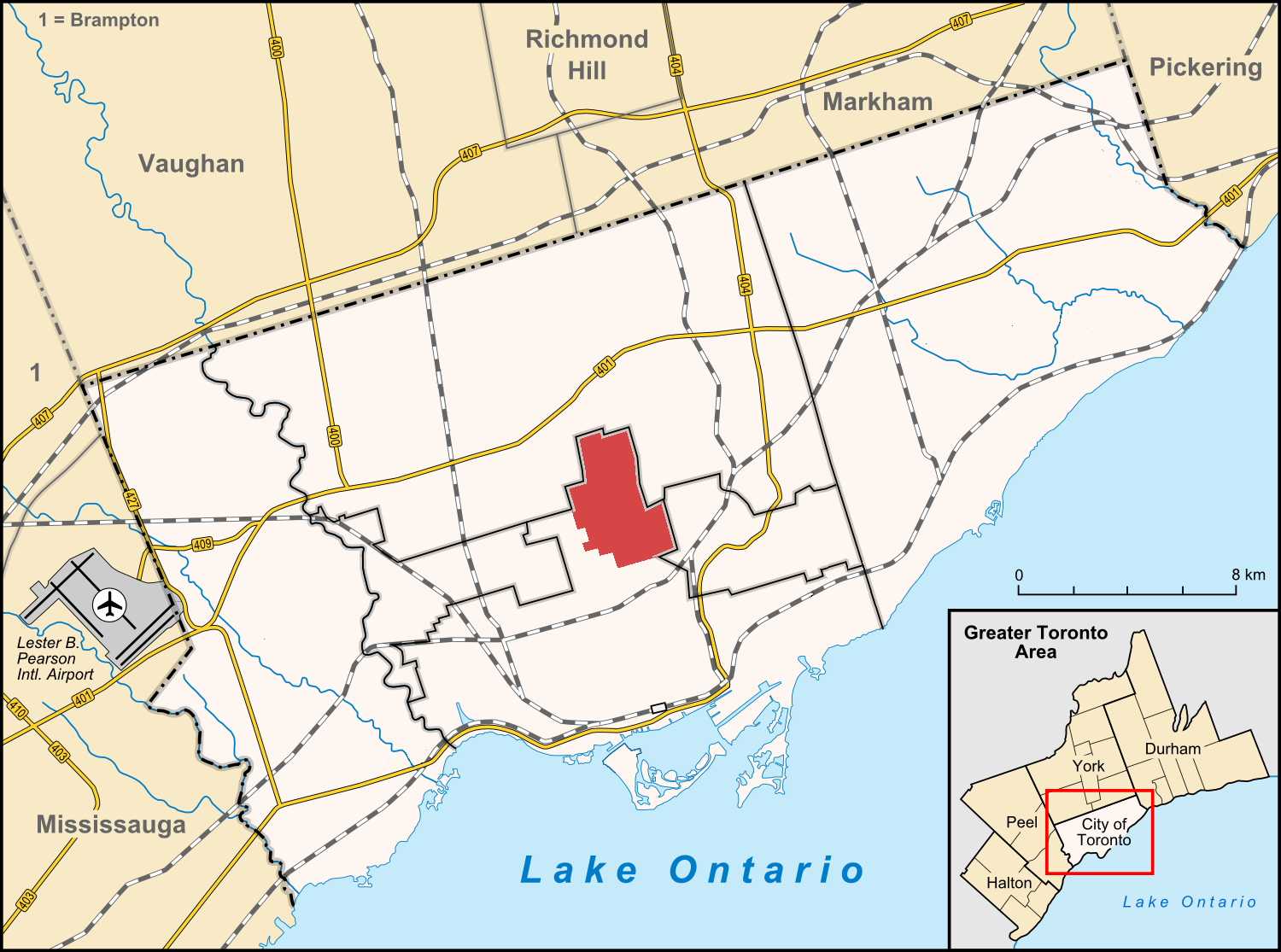
- Location of North Toronto in Toronto
- Country: Canada
- Province: Ontario
- City: Toronto
- Community: Toronto
- Incorporated: 1890 Town of North Toronto by amalgamating Bedford Park, Eglinton and Davisville
- Annexed: 1912 into Toronto

North Toronto is a former town and informal district located in Toronto, Ontario, Canada. The Town of North Toronto was incorporated in 1890 by consolidating the villages of Bedford Park, Eglinton and Davisville. The town was annexed by Toronto in 1912. The name is still used to refer to the area in general, although Yonge–Eglinton and Midtown Toronto are officially used.

The former town was bounded on the south by Moore Avenue east to Bayview Avenue, north to Eglinton Avenue, west to Bruce, north to Fairfield, west to the west boundary of Mount Hope Cemetery, then north to north of Glen Echo, west to Yonge, north to north of McNairn Avenue, then west to a line just west of Elm Road. The boundary continues south to just north of Glenview Avenue and Avenue Road, then west to a line with Proudfoot Avenue, then south to just north of Briar Hill, then south on Castlewood to Roselawn, then south on Latimer to Eglinton Avenue. The boundary continues east on Eglinton to Elmsthorpe, then south to the former rail line south of Chaplin Crescent, then east to Yonge.

== Origins ==
Federal census population history of North Toronto
Year	Pop.	±%
1901	1,852	—
1911	5,362	+189.5%
Source: Statistics Canada

Toronto's Yonge streetcar line was then extended along Yonge Street through North Toronto, replacing the Metropolitan line, the former radial railway service. North Toronto soon emerged as a popular streetcar suburb, with the area becoming completely developed by the 1940s. The streetcar was replaced in 1954 by the Toronto Transit Commission's Yonge subway as far as Eglinton Avenue and a trolleybus running north from there, which was replaced in turn by a subway extension in 1973. Today North Toronto is a relatively affluent community, and very popular with young families.

== Character ==
The neighbourhood has had a mixed-density design for some time, but this is rapidly changing to a greater density with the construction of residential condominium buildings in the area. The southern part of the neighbourhood is densely populated, with the entire section between Yonge Street and Mount Pleasant Road south of Davisville Avenue built up with high rise apartment buildings. More recently, condo buildings have further added to this density, especially south of Merton Street (backing onto historic Mount Pleasant Cemetery). Additional condo developments have begun on Mount Pleasant Road, and the existing medium-rise dwellings southeast of Yonge and Eglinton have been joined by developer Minto's Quantum towers of 37 and 54 stories.

Mount Pleasant Cemetery serves as a major green space for the southern end of the neighbourhood. South of the cemetery are trails in two ravines of the former Mud Creek and Yellow Creek, which lead to the Don River. On the north side of the cemetery is the Beltline Trail, a heavily used pedestrian and cycling path on the route of a former railway line. The Belt Line Railway was a short-lived commuter route in the 1890s. It was subsequently purchased by Canadian National Railway and used for freight until service was discontinued in the 1960s. The path goes northwest to Eglinton Avenue, then curves west, and ends at the William R. Allen Road, known locally as the Allen Expressway. Other green spaces includes Eglinton Park just west of Yonge Street and Alexander Muir Memorial Gardens at Yonge Street and Lawrence Avenue, which connects to Sherwood Ravine Park and Sunnybrook Park to the east.

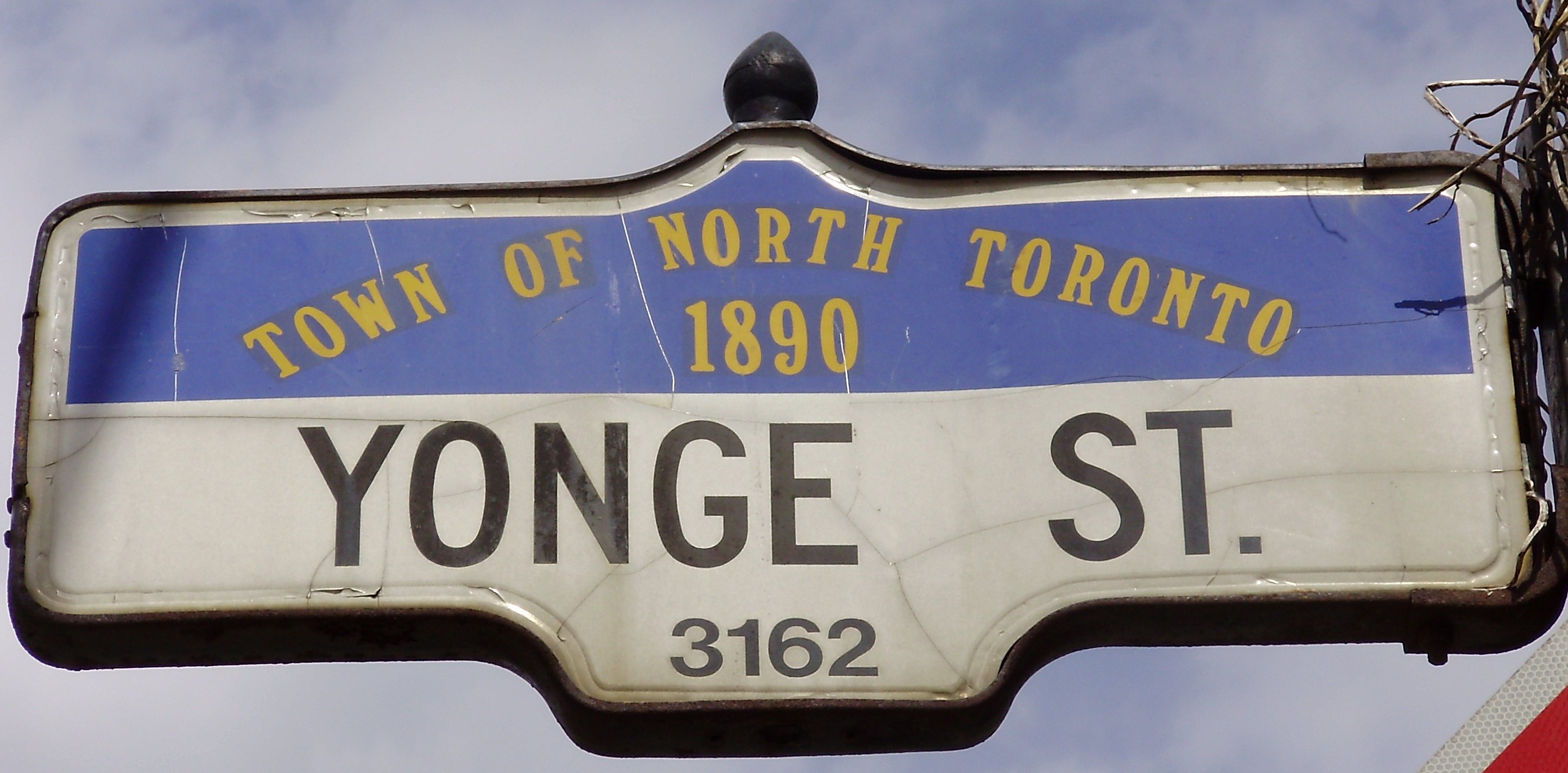
Street sign designed in honour of North Toronto

North Toronto is served by north–south commercial strips on Yonge Street, Mount Pleasant Road, and Bayview Avenue, and an east–west strip on Eglinton Avenue. These offer an array of shopping and dining aimed primarily at the local market, and as with many main streets in Toronto neighbourhoods, are largely given to small, locally owned shops in free-standing buildings. The corner of Yonge and Eglinton features the Yonge Eglinton Centre complex, which includes a shopping mall, multiplex cinema, and both office and residential towers; and Canada Square, an office complex with a small shopping concourse and another, older multiplex. Both are connected to Eglinton subway station. The headquarters of Canadian Tire, TVOntario, RioCan, Heart and Stroke Foundation and the Toronto Transit Commission are located in North Toronto.

Libraries can be found on Bayview Avenue, at Yonge and Lawrence, and near Yonge and Eglinton, along with a children's-focused library on Mount Pleasant. There are two community centres in North Toronto; Central Eglinton Community Centre, at Eglinton and Redpath, offers a wide variety of programs and services for caregivers & young children, adults. and people 50+. North Toronto Memorial Community Centre is located at Eglinton Park (Eglinton Avenue and Oriole Parkway). What was once North America's largest bridge club, Kate Buckman's, was on Mount Pleasant near Eglinton for many years until its closure in 2007; the Toronto Bridge Club is on St. Clair near Yonge. The Toronto Camera Club finds its home on Mount Pleasant Road near Millwood Road.

== Neighbourhoods ==
North Toronto is composed of a number of distinct neighbourhoods. It has more recently also become synonymous with Midtown.

- Allenby
- Bedford Park
- Chaplin Estates
- Davisville Village
- Lawrence Park
- Lytton Park
- Wanless Park
- Yonge–Eglinton

== See also ==
- TTC Davisville, Eglinton, and Lawrence stations
