= Yonge Eglinton Centre =

Office complex in Toronto

Coordinates: 43.707245°N 79.39903°W

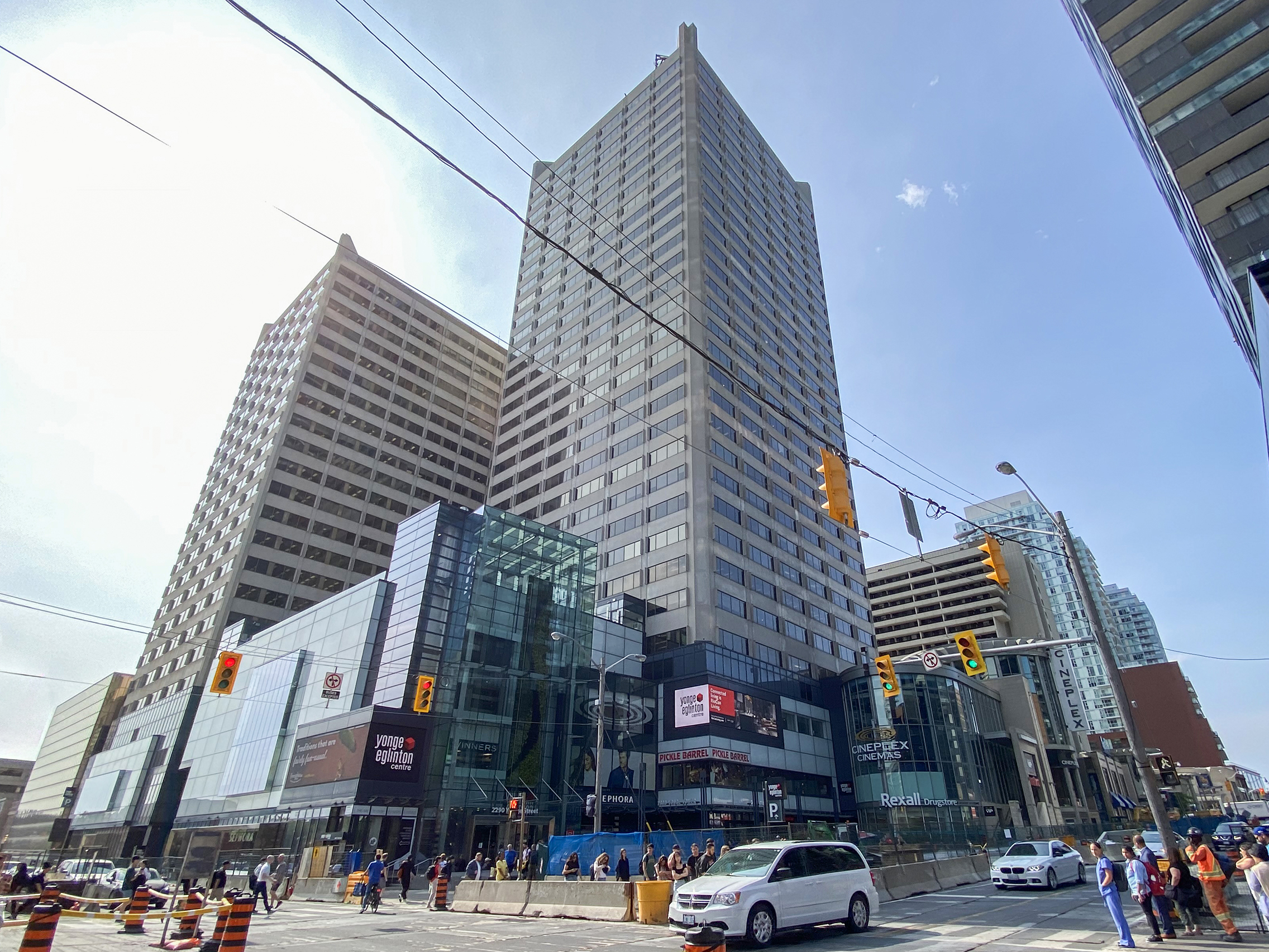
The towers of the Yonge Eglinton Centre

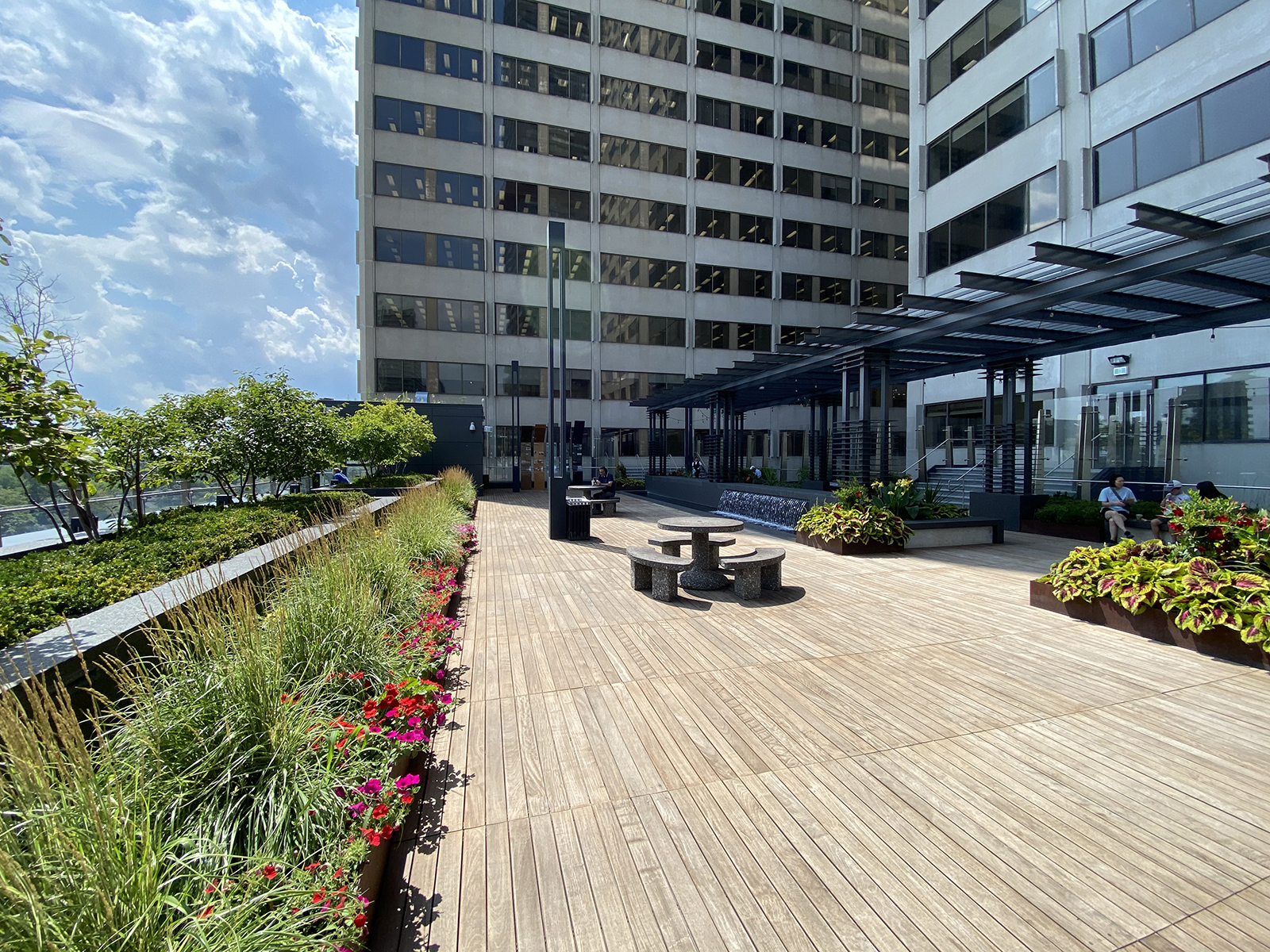
Rooftop patio

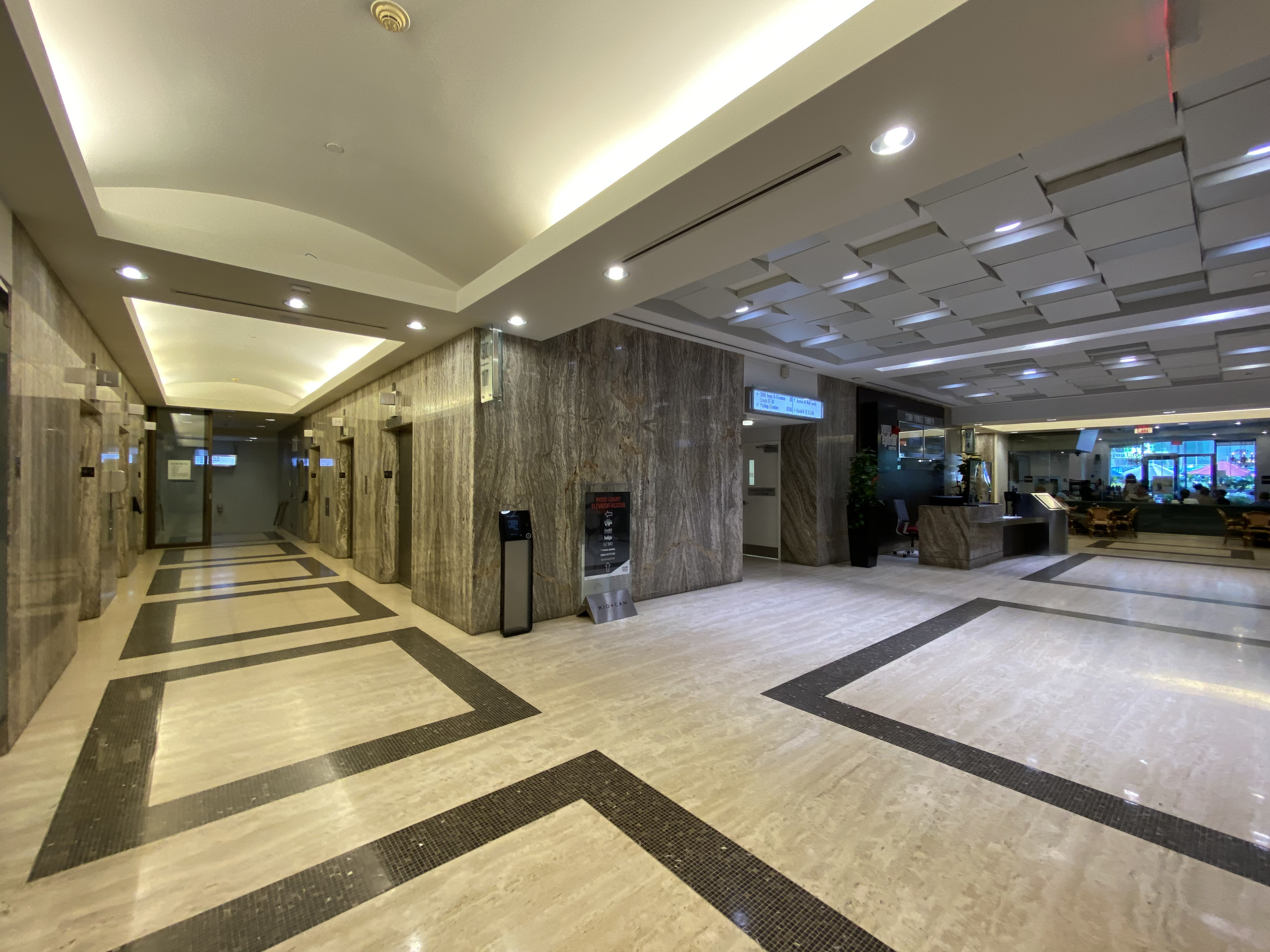
Office lobby

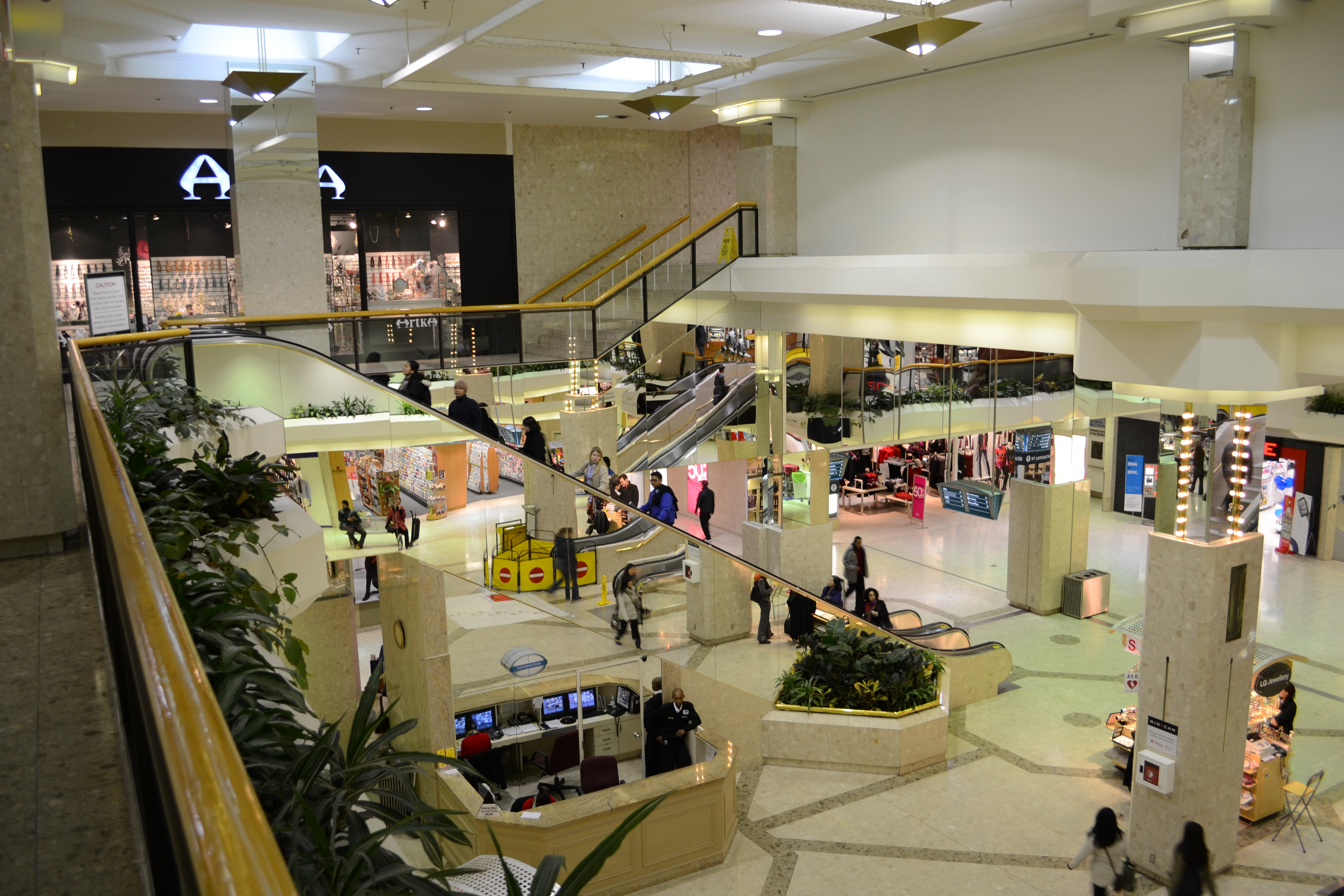
Arcade before renovation

Yonge Eglinton Centre is a complex comprising two office buildings situated on the northwest corner of Yonge and Eglinton in Toronto, Ontario, Canada, along with a small shopping concourse. It is located across the street from Canada Square and, at the time of its construction, was one of only a few large office towers north of Bloor Street. It is connected via an underground tunnel to Eglinton subway station.

AA revitalization project completed in 2016 added seven floors to 2300 Yonge Street and five floors to 20 Eglinton Avenue West, and also involved re-cladding the towers with curtain wall glass. A new publicly-accessible rooftop patio and green wall were also installed.

== History ==
Construction began in the early 1970s through a partnership between Greenwin and Horizon developers, and involved the demolition of a Dominion supermarket, an F.W. Woolworth store, and several residential homes to the west.

The project was completed in several phases. The first phase involved constructing a 23-storey rental apartment building at 411 Duplex Avenue, followed by the development of 20 Eglinton West and half of the retail concourse.

Phase Two involved completing the remaining retail space across the entire block and constructing the second office tower at 2300 Yonge Street.

The final phase involved building a large rental apartment complex at 33 Orchardview.

== Buildings ==
=== 2300 Yonge Street ===
The tower is anchored by the complex owners, RioCan, who relocated their head office to Tower I in 2007. The building houses many offices and retail shops in the lobby, and provides TTC subway access via a concourse-level tunnel.

2300 Yonge Street
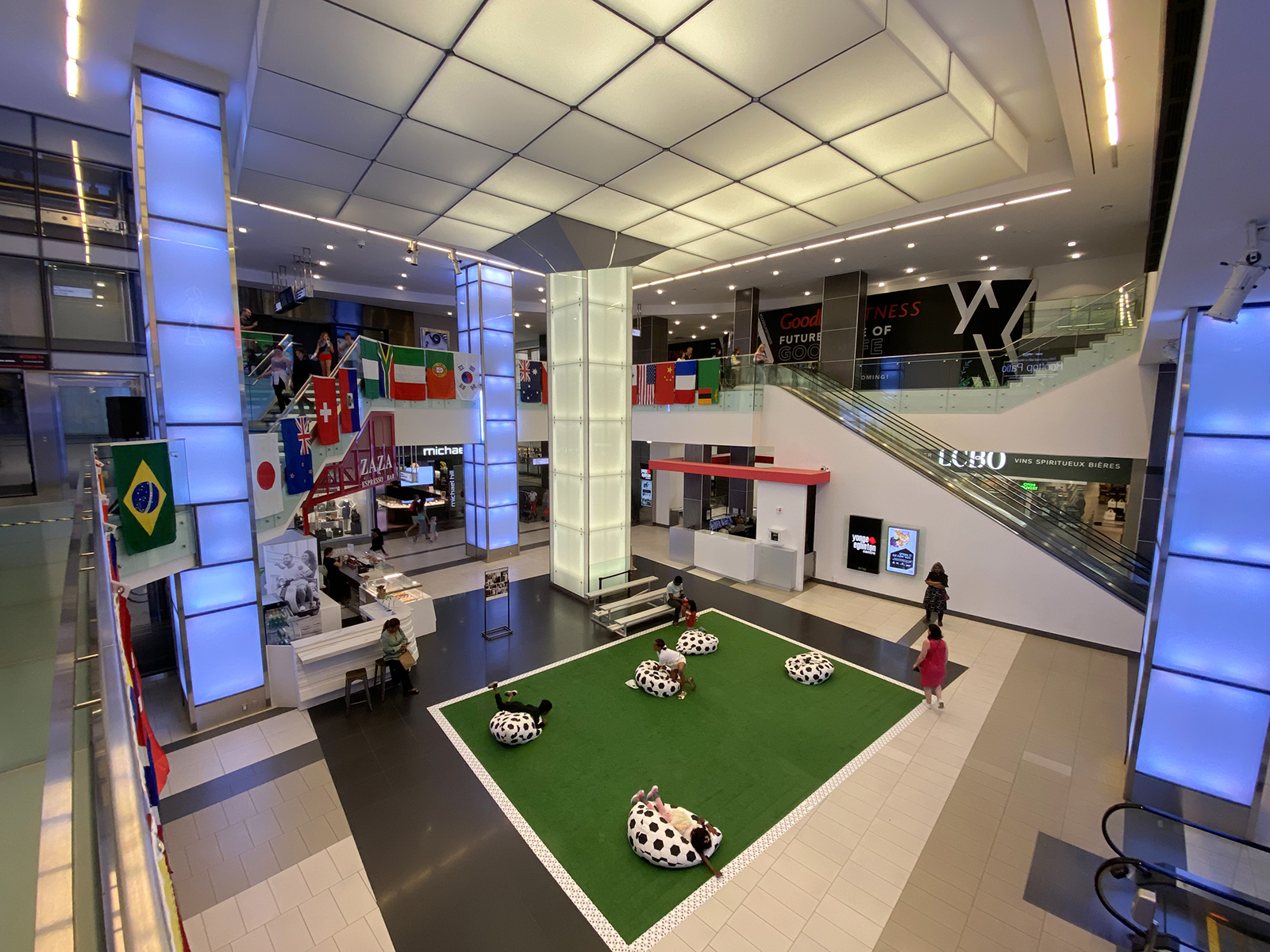
- RioCan Yonge Eglinton Centre
- Interactive map of the 2300 Yonge Street area
- Alternative names: Yonge Eglinton Centre I

General information
- Type: Commercial offices
- Location: Toronto, Ontario
- Completed: 1974
- Owner: RioCan Real Estate Investment Trust

Height
- Top floor: 30

Technical details
- Floor count: 30
- Lifts/elevators: 12

Design and construction
- Architect: Kenneth R Cooper

=== 20 Eglinton Avenue West ===
20 Eglinton Avenue West
- Interactive map of the 20 Eglinton Avenue West area
- Alternative names: Yonge Eglinton Centre II

General information
- Type: Commercial offices
- Location: Toronto, Ontario
- Completed: 1974
- Owner: RioCan Real Estate Investment Trust

Height
- Top floor: 22

Technical details
- Floor count: 22

Design and construction
- Architect: Kenneth R Cooper

=== Retail Complex ===
There are three levels for retail space below the towers. The Yonge Eglinton Centre houses over 65 stores and services:

- The Fresh Tea Shop
- Winners
- GoodLife Fitness
- Cineplex VIP
- Pickle Barrel
- Indigo Books
- Urban Outfitters
- Metro - originally as Dominion which occupied the site before the complex was built
- HSBC - changed to RBC after HSBC pulled out of Canada and sold retail arm in 2024
- Rexall
- Sephora
- Tim Hortons

In 1973, T. Eaton Company opened one of its Horizon discount department stores at the property. The space was converted to a regular Eaton's store upon the closure of the Horizon chain in January 1978; the Eaton's store closed in the 1990s. Floor space is now used by Winners, Pickle Barrel and GoodLife Fitness.
