= Eglinton Park =

Public park in Toronto

- A building in the middle of the park

- Location within Toronto
- Type: Public Park
- Location: Toronto, Ontario
- Coordinates: 43°42′28″N 79°24′20″W
- Created: 1926
- Operator: City of Toronto
- Public transit: Eglinton station

Eglinton Park is a public park located in the North Toronto neighbourhood of Toronto, Ontario, Canada, a few blocks west of the Eglinton Subway Station. It is bounded on the south end by Eglinton Avenue West, on the north by Roselawn Aveunue. The other two sides of the park have houses backing onto the park; Oriole Parkway on the west side, and Edith Drive on the east.

The park has two baseball diamonds, soccer fields, a splash pool, and a kids playground. Outdoor tennis courts are turned into skating rinks in the winter. Also located in the park is the North Toronto Community Memorial Centre with an indoor pool, outdoor pool, water slides, gymnasium, walking track, and exercise rooms. There is also an indoor skating rink.

== History ==
- Eglinton or Pears park is situated on the original site of the Davisville and Carlton Brick Company (later changed to Davisville and Eglinton Brick Manufacturing Co.), owned and operated by James Pears. 1885 James Pears purchases the site. The Pears family were well-known brickmakers during the late 1800’s and early 1900’s. James’ father, Leonard Pears, owned the Carlton Brick Company and his brother, William, was the president of the Ontario Paving Brick Company
- 1923 the City of Toronto purchased 22.8 acres from James Pears for $140,000. The park was called "The North Toronto Athletic Field", but was commonly called Pears Park by the area residents
- 1929 the park was renamed to "Eglinton Park" after the 13th Earl of Eglinton of Ayrshire, Scotland. Since 1929 the City has made several purchases adjacent to the original land
- There are two versions of the origin of the name “Eglinton”:

 - it was adopted from a medieval tournament held in the castle of the 13th Earl of Eglinton in August 1839;   
 - after the War of 1812, many veterans were given small land grants in what is now the Yonge-Eglinton area. The Earl of Eglinton opened his purse to these men, and in gratitude, they gave his name to the district (Jackes’ version)  

- 1998 The Heritage Community Garden is created within the park

== See also ==
- Eglinton Country Park, North Ayrshire, Scotland, also named after the 13th Earl of Eglinton
