= Yonge–Eglinton =

- Central business district
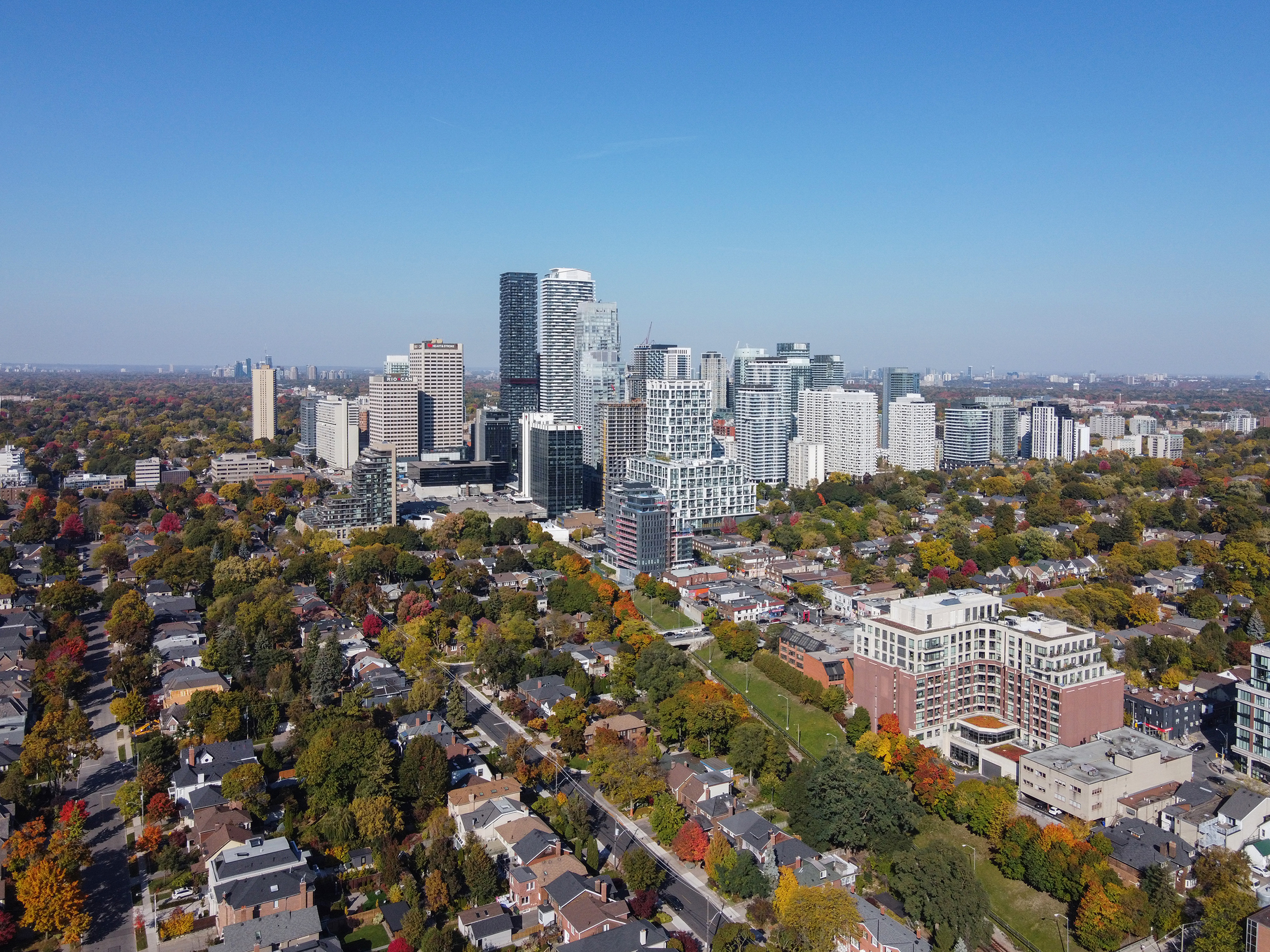
- Aerial view of Yonge and Eglinton in 2024

- Location within Toronto
- Coordinates: 43.70675°N 79.39833°W
- Country: Canada
- Province: Ontario
- City: Toronto

Population
  - Total: 25,057
- Time zone: UTC-05:00 (EST)
  - Summer (DST): UTC-04:00 (EDT)

Yonge–Eglinton is a neighbourhood in Toronto, Ontario, Canada, centred around the intersection of Yonge Street and Eglinton Avenue. It is the central section of Midtown Toronto, one of four central business districts outside Downtown Toronto. The City of Toronto defines its boundaries as Briar Hill Avenue to the north, Yonge Street to the east, Frobisher Avenue and a line in that direction west to Elmsthorpe Avenue, then north to Eglinton Avenue, east to Avenue Road and north to Briar Hill.

According to a survey conducted in 2017 by Toronto Life, it was the highest-ranked neighbourhood in Greater Toronto with regards to housing, crime rate, transit, health, entertainment, people and employment. It is geographically central to the city of Toronto and surrounded by a number of the country's highly affluent neighbourhoods, including Forest Hill, Lytton Park and Lawrence Park. The median income sits at $108,543, which is 24% higher than the Ontario average.

== History ==
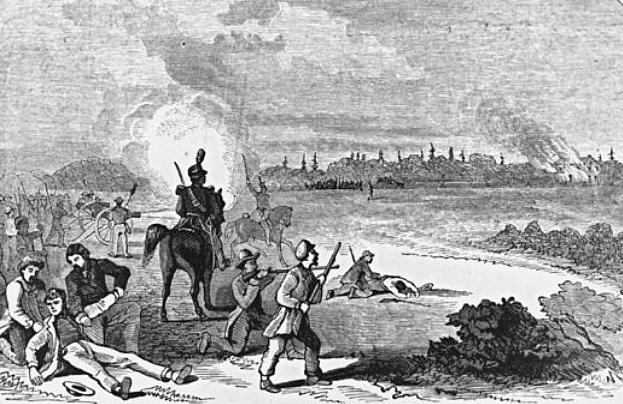
In 1837, a revolutionary insurrection was crushed on Yonge Street, just north of Eglinton Avenue, by British regulars and the Canadian militia.

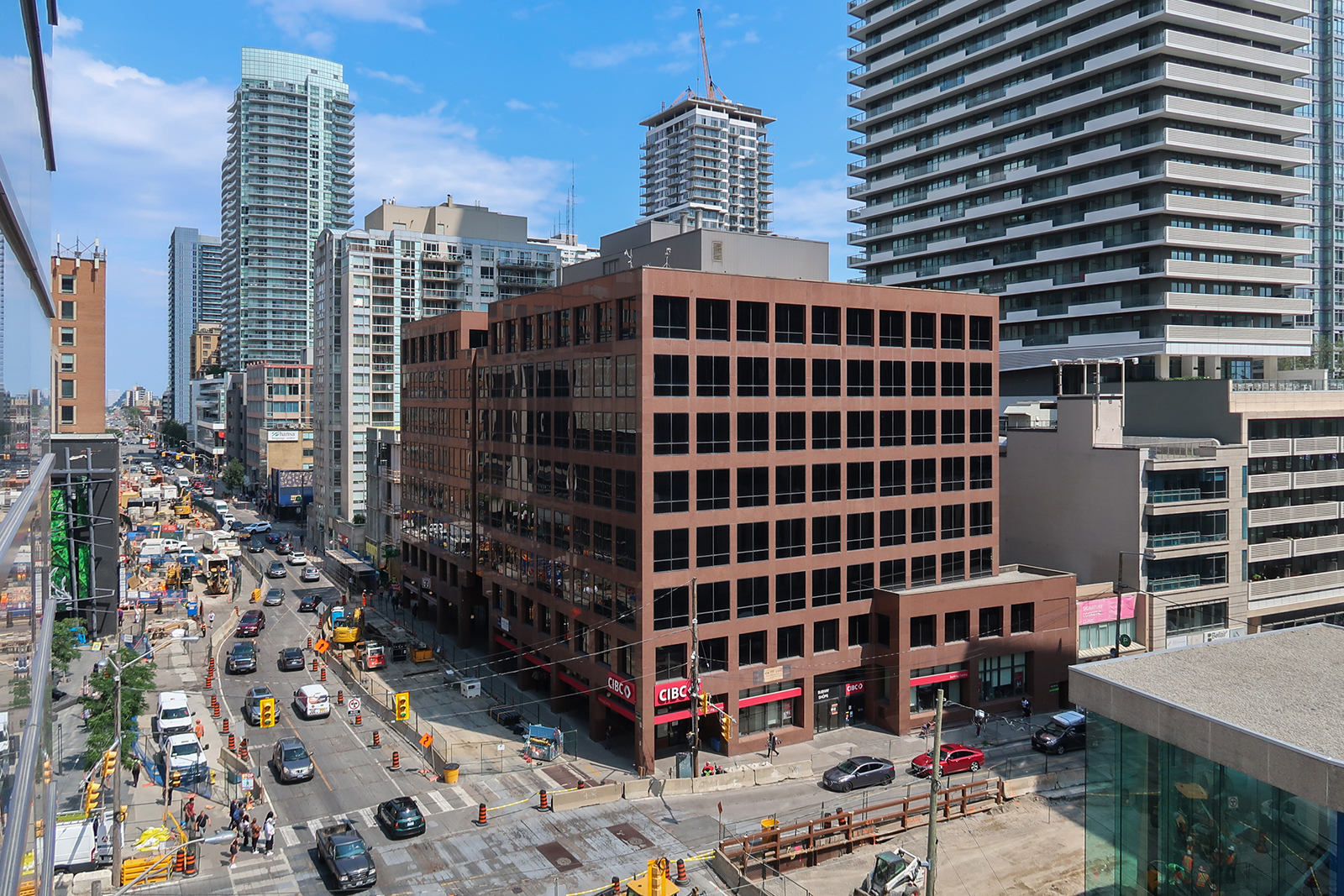
Construction works in Yonge and Eglinton during 2023

The neighbourhood was first settled by Europeans in the early nineteenth century, who founded the farming village of Eglinton. The area was part of the largest cattle grazing region in Upper Canada. The region was the first in North America to extend the use of cowbells to all cattle. Prior to this, it had been standard practice for a cowbell to be attached to only the best and leading piece of livestock. To honour this proud and storied heritage, the City of Toronto government named a local street "Cowbell Lane." In 1837, the Battle of Montgomery's Tavern took place just north of the Yonge Street and Eglinton Avenue intersection.

In 1884, the Metropolitan Street Railway began operating a horse-drawn streetcar route on Yonge Street from Toronto to the village. Rapid housing development soon followed. As the population grew the area was incorporated in 1890 into the town of North Toronto. North Toronto was then annexed to Toronto in 1912. In 1922, the Yonge streetcar line was extended north to replace the Metropolitan line passing Eglinton Avenue to terminate at Glen Echo Road. In 1954, the Yonge subway line opened its first twelve stations with its north terminus at Eglinton and remained so until 1973 when the line was extended north to York Mills. In 2026, a new light rail line, Line 5 Eglinton, opened. It runs along Eglinton Avenue from Mount Dennis station to Kennedy station, with a stop at the existing Eglinton subway station to provide a transfer between Line 5 and Line 1.

== Economy ==
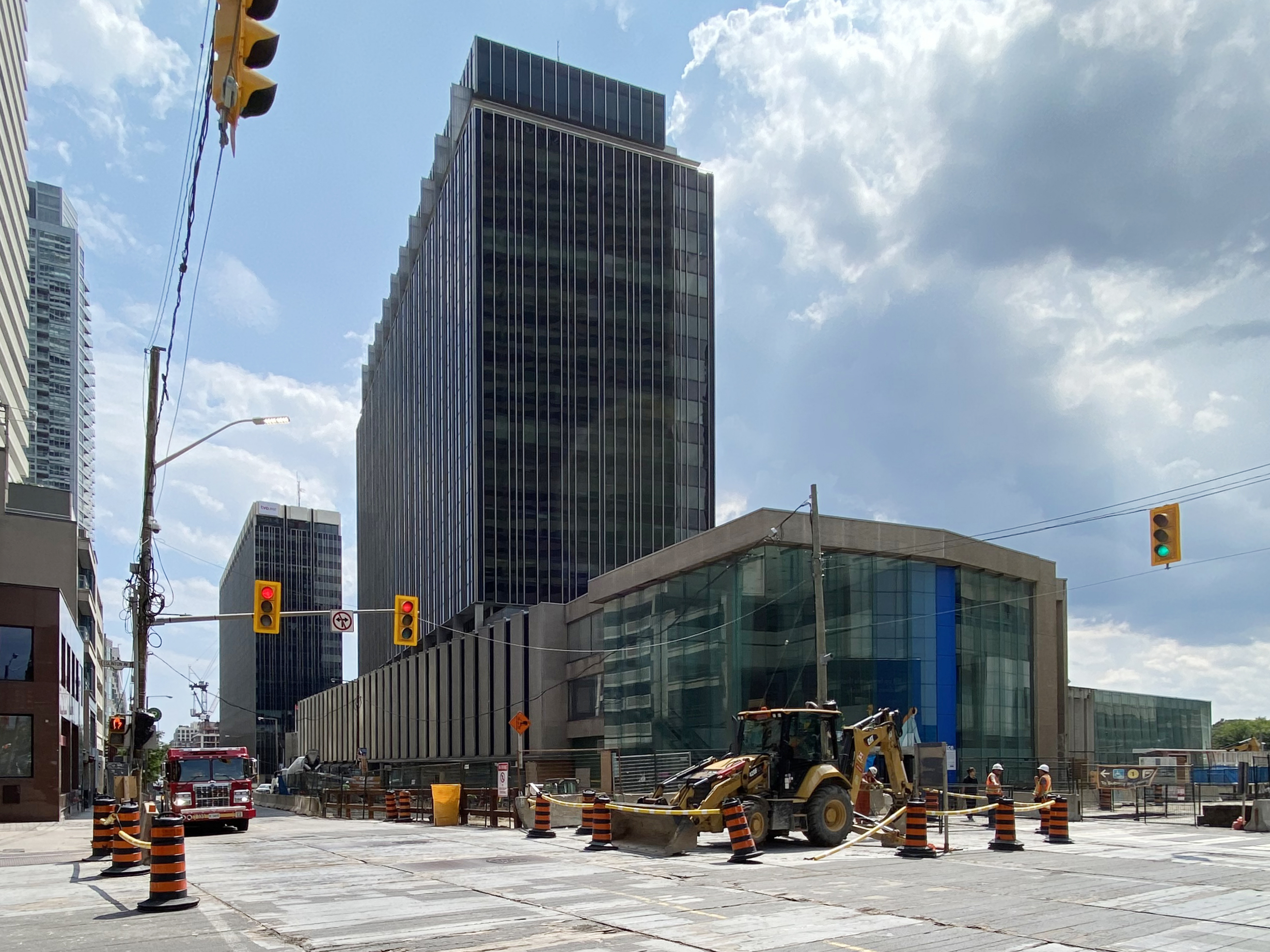
Canada Square is a corporate office complex located at Yonge and Eglinton.

A number of businesses have their corporate headquarters at the intersection, including Canadian Tire, TVOntario and the Heart and Stroke Foundation of Ontario. Canada Square is an office tower complex at the intersection holding other corporate offices.
