= Lytton Park =

- Neighbourhood
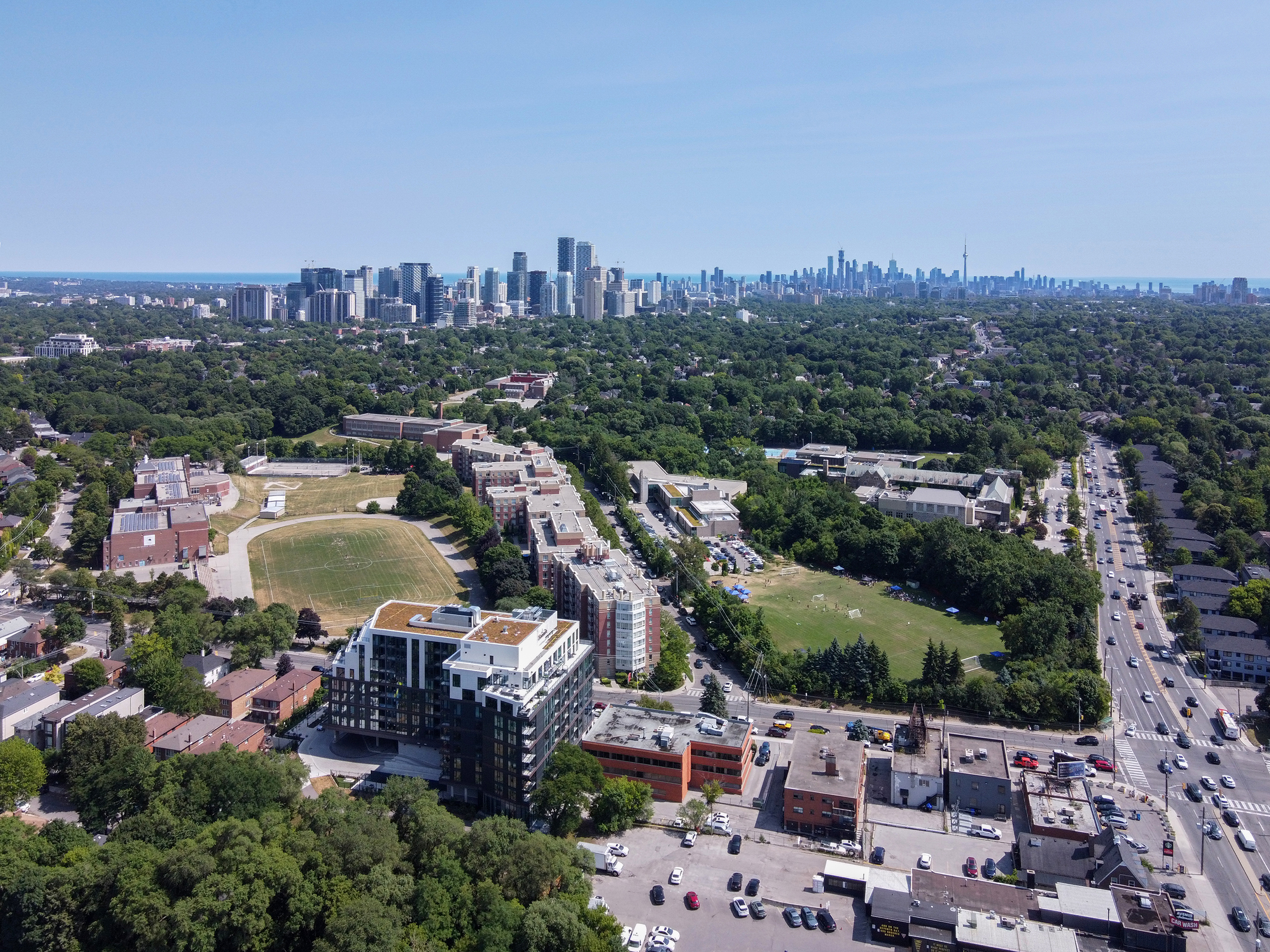
- Aerial view of Lytton Park in 2025

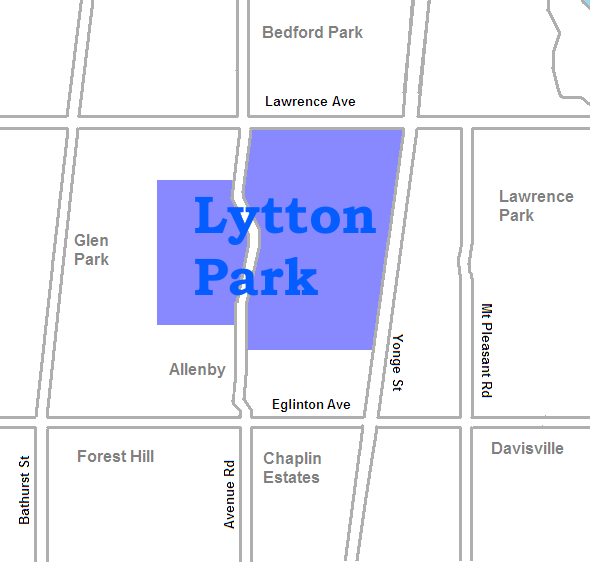
- Vicinity

- Location within Toronto
- Coordinates: 43.717829°N 79.407833°W
- Country: Canada
- Province: Ontario
- City: Toronto

Lytton Park is a neighbourhood in Toronto, Ontario, Canada. It is located in the "North Toronto" municipality, within the former city of Toronto (Old Toronto). The neighbourhood is centered on 'Lytton Park' (hence the name). Its boundaries include: Mona Drive to the west, Yonge Street to the east, Lawrence Avenue West to the north and Briar Hill Avenue to the south.

== History ==
Lytton Park originally started out as a rural suburb of Toronto, part of North Toronto. In 1886, the Metropolitan Street Railway (Toronto) decided to service this small area. Upon realizing that the land value in this region would go up when the railway was installed, the Railway company purchased a huge amount of farmland near their railway station on Glengrove Avenue. Two years later, the residential `boom` of this neighbourhood started. In 1912, the district was annexed into the City of Toronto. From then on, this area morphed into what it is today, with its many schools, parks, and shops.

== Architecture ==
Lytton Park predominantly features Georgian and Tudor Style houses. Many of these houses were built from 1890 to 1930. Houses in Lytton Park are situated on large lots with lush, manicured gardens. There is an abundance of mature trees that line the streets providing a shady "canopy" in the summer and creating a picturesque snowy effect in the winter. Recently, many houses in Lytton Park have become subject to extensive renovations or have been totally rebuilt, transforming the neighborhood architecture.

== Transportation ==
Most Lytton Park residents are within walking distance of bus routes that run along Yonge Street and Avenue Road (142 Downtown/Avenue Road Express; 61 Avenue Road North). The Lawrence and Eglinton subway stations, part of the Yonge-University-Spadina line, are also within walking distance from most parts of the neighbourhood.

Highway 401 is within a five- to ten-minute drive from Lytton Park, accessible via Yonge Street and Avenue Road. As well, the Financial District is within a fifteen-minute drive from the neighbourhood.

== Education ==
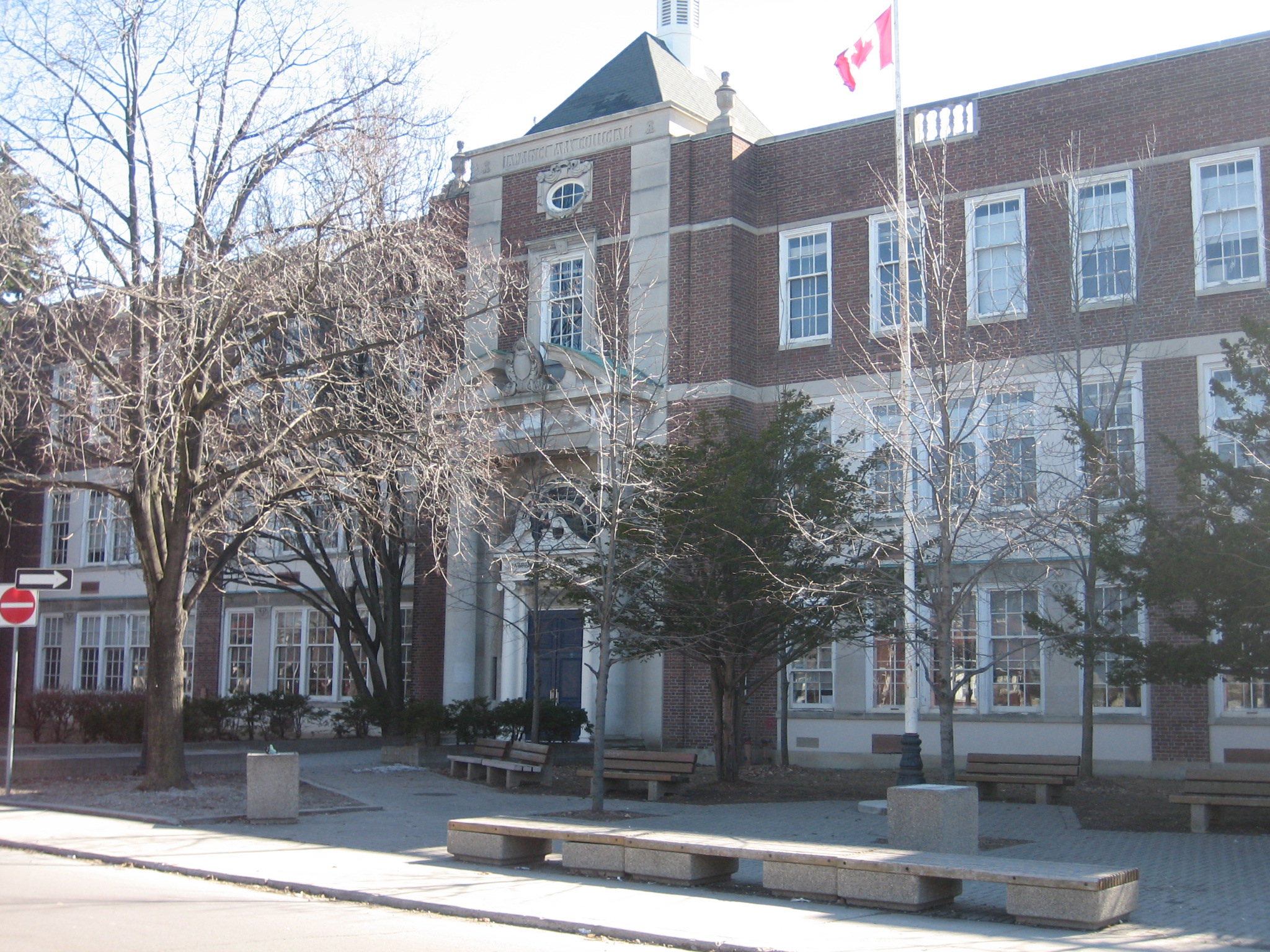
Located in Lytton Hill, Lawrence Park Collegiate Institute is a public secondary school operated by the Toronto District School Board.

Secular English-oriented public schools in Lytton Park are operated by the Toronto District School Board. In addition to the Toronto District School Board, three other publicly funded school boards operate in Toronto. The publicly funded English-oriented separate schools in Toronto are operated by the Toronto Catholic District School Board. Secular French-oriented public schools are provided by Conseil scolaire Viamonde, whereas French-oriented public separate school are provided by Conseil scolaire catholique MonAvenir. However, the latter three school boards do not operate a school in Lytton Hill. Public schools in the area include:

- John Ross Robertson Junior Public School
- Glenview Senior Public School
- Lawrence Park Collegiate Institute

Two private schools also operate in the area, Havergal College and St. Clement's School. Both institutions provide elementary and secondary levels of education.

== Gallery ==
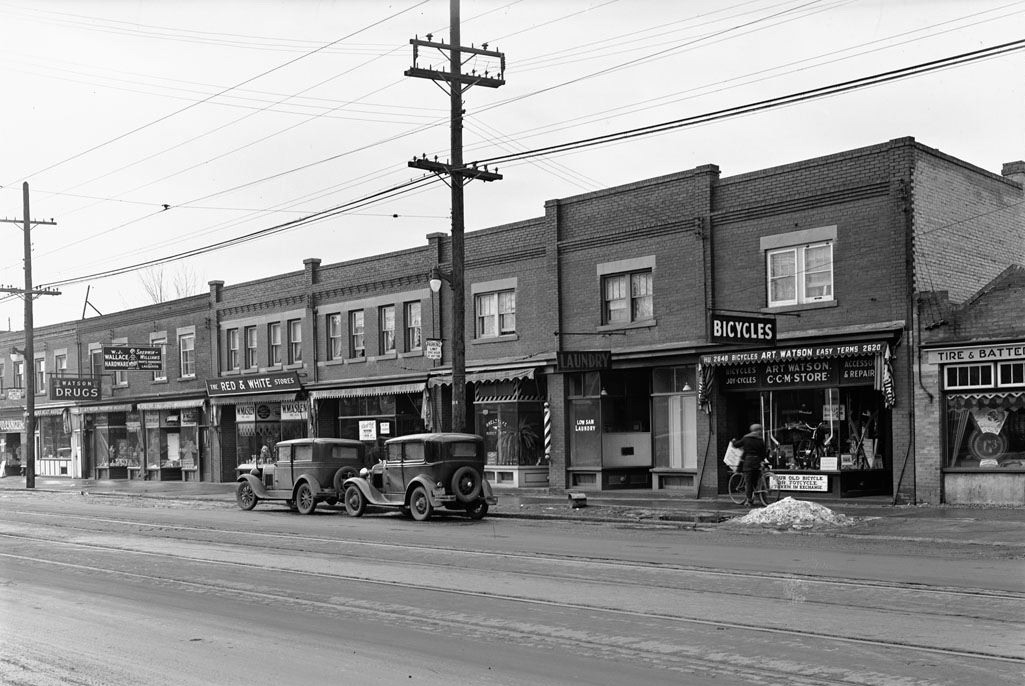
Yonge Street in 1935, south of Craighurst Ave.

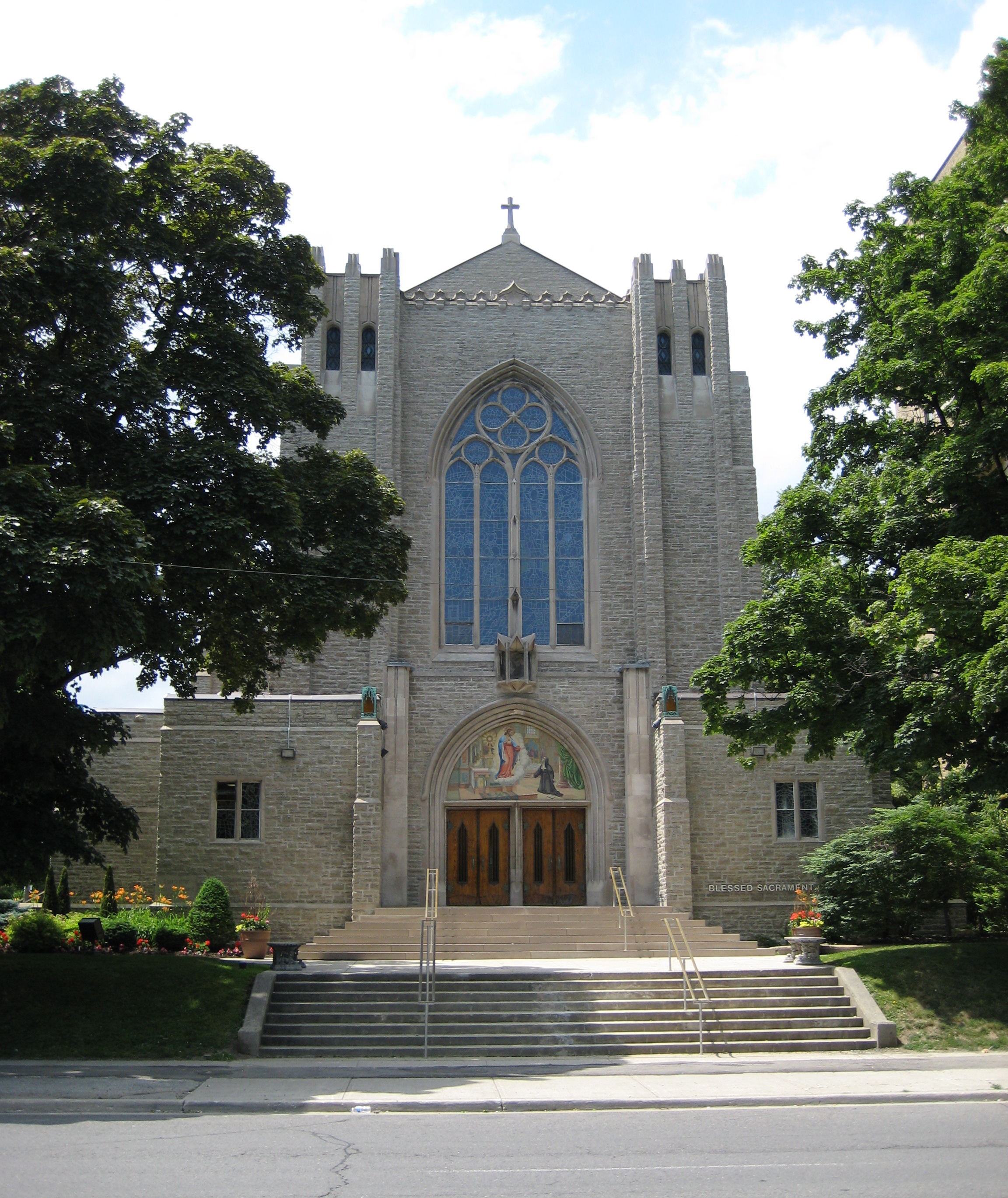
Blessed Sacrament Roman Catholic Church

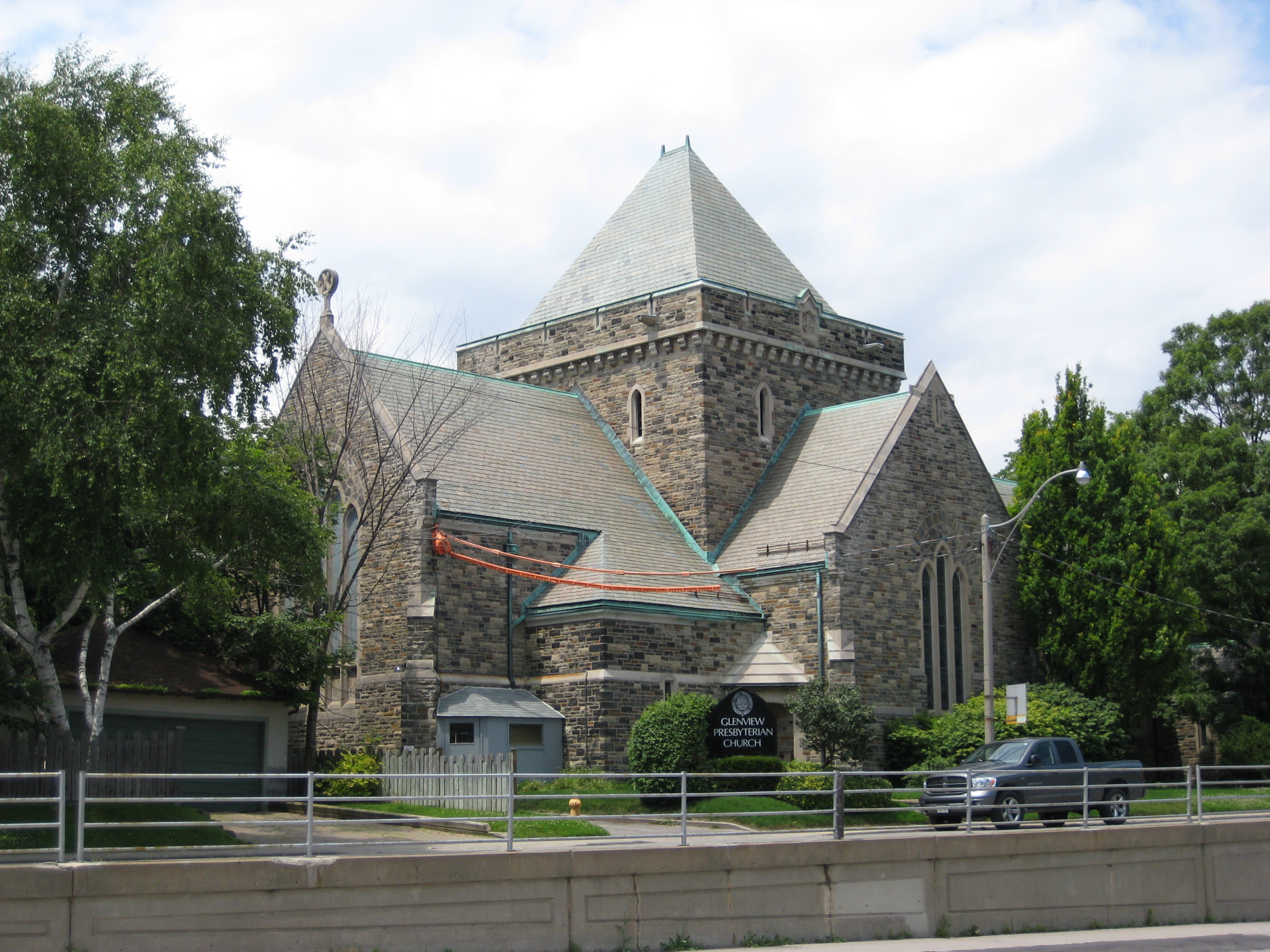
Glenview Presbyterian Church

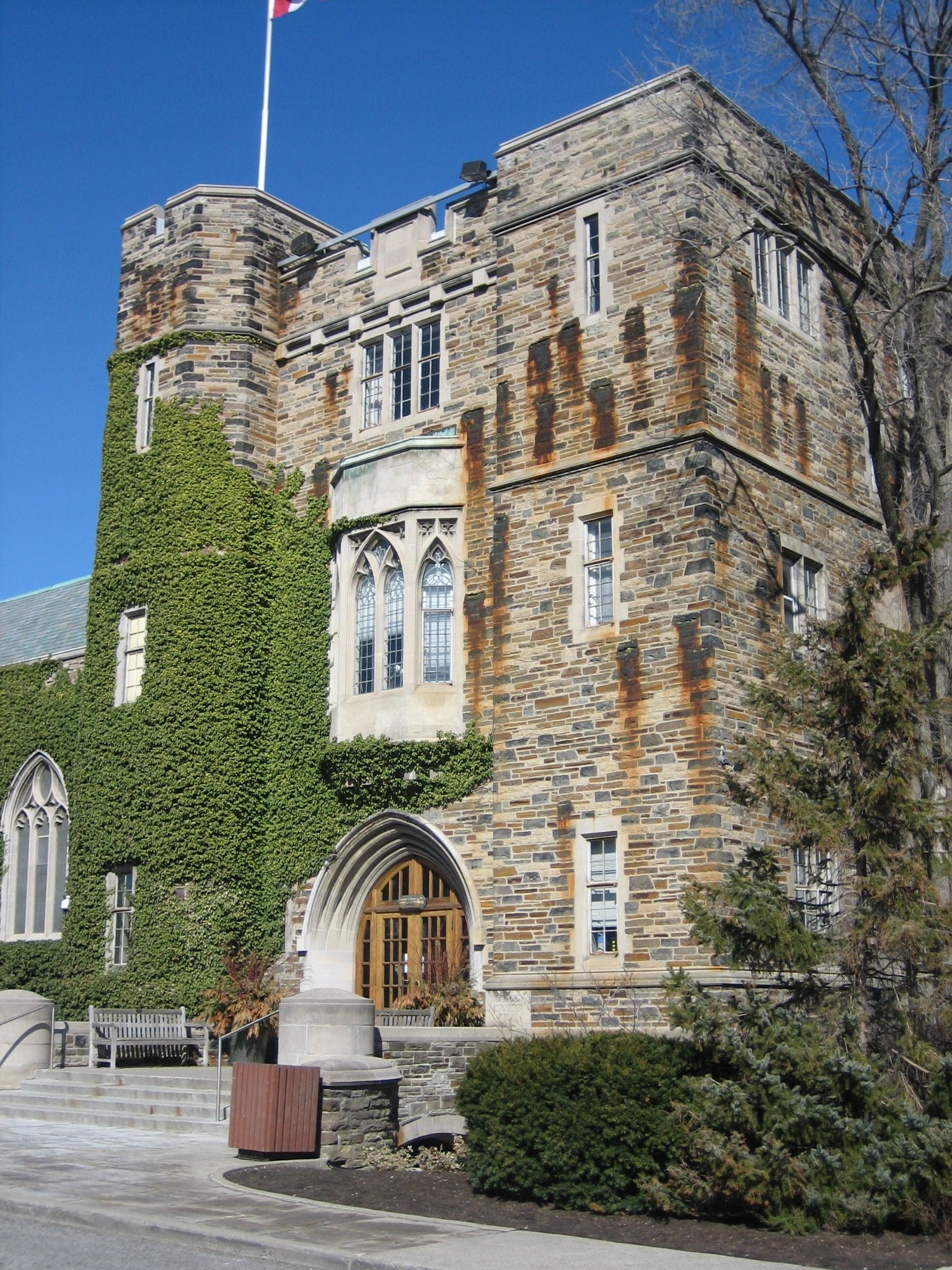
Havergal College

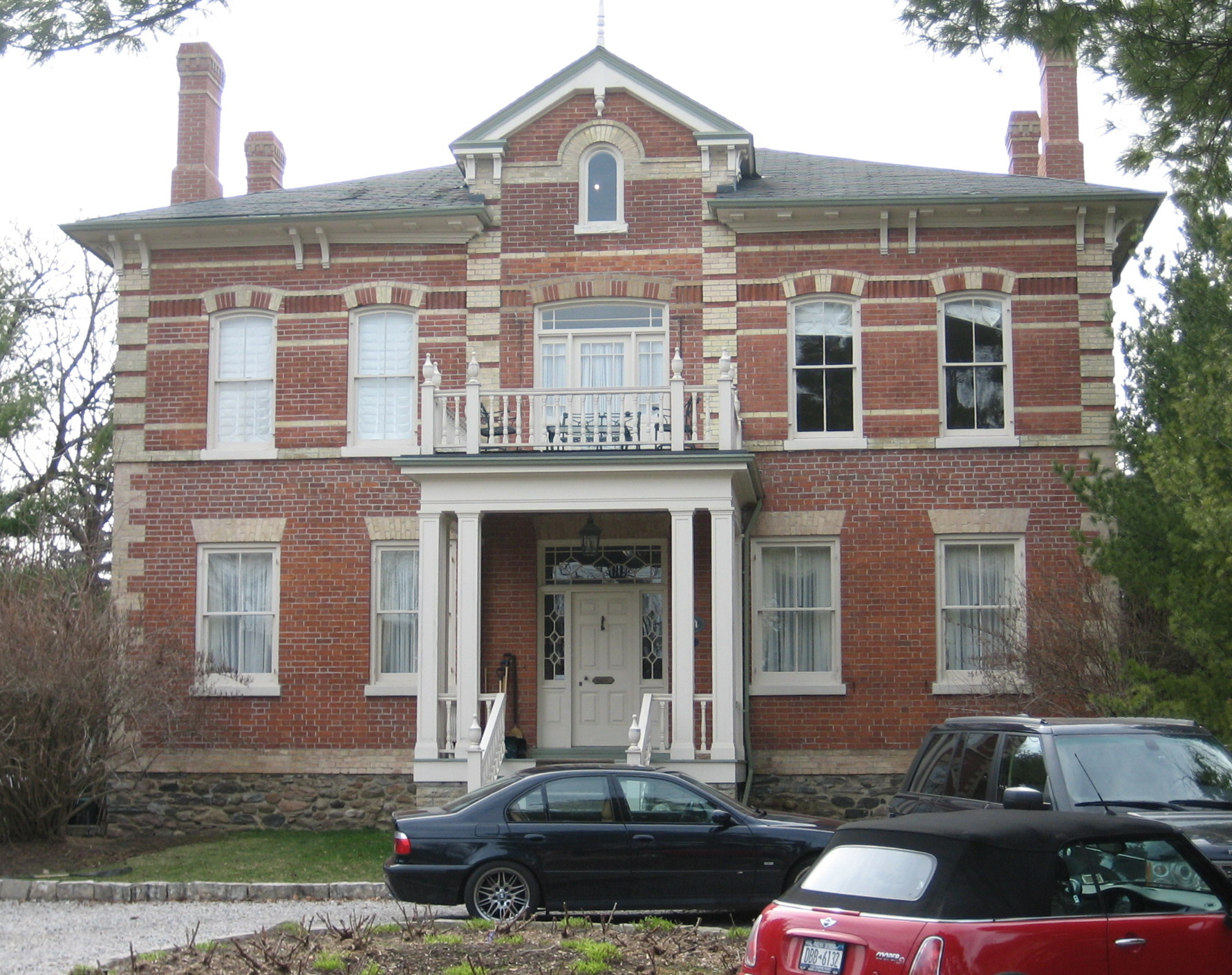
Historic Snider House at 744 Duplex Avenue
