= Lawrence Park Collegiate Institute =

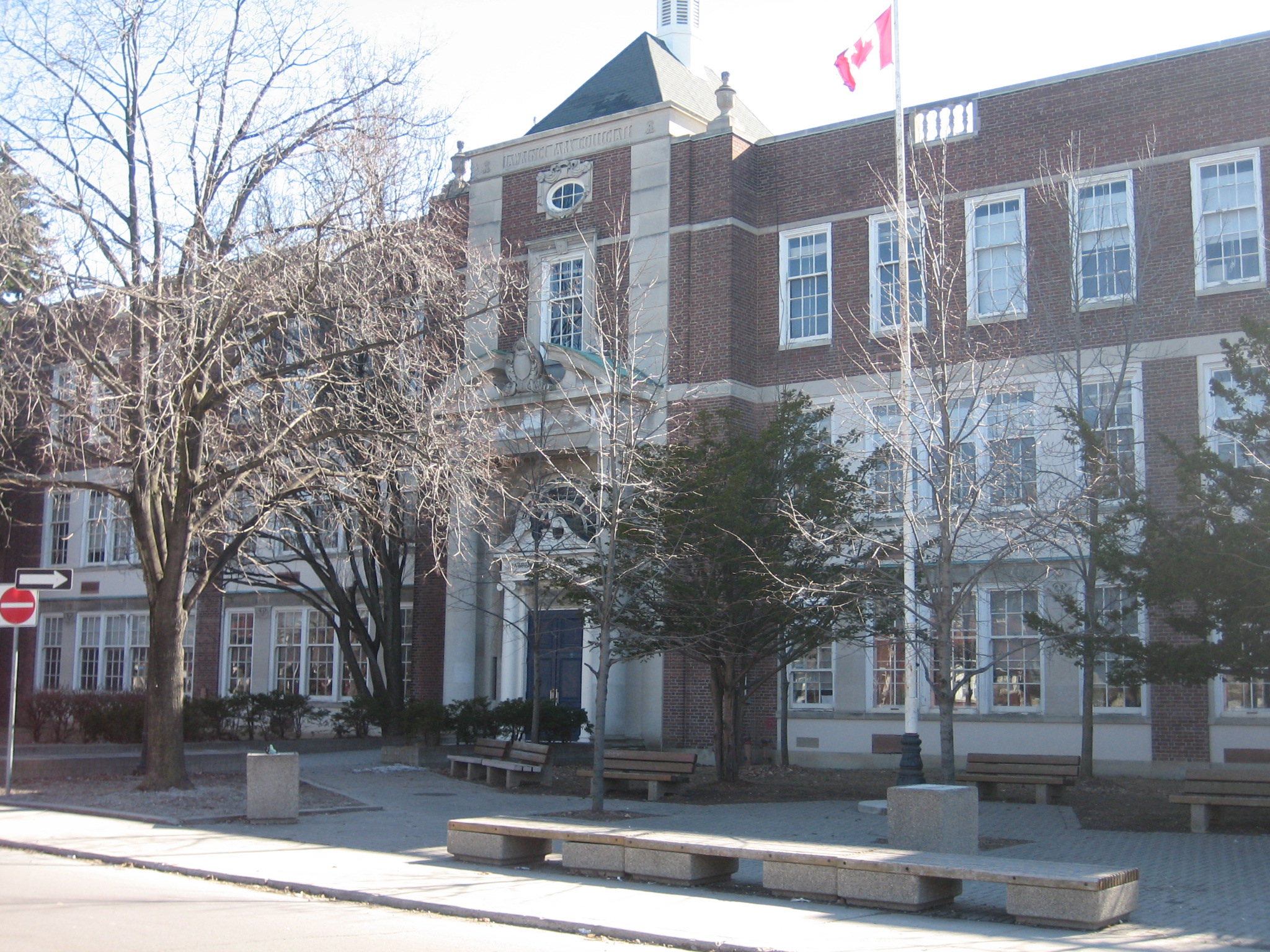
- Lawrence Park C.I. entrance

Location
- 125 Chatsworth Drive; Toronto, Ontario, M4R 1S1; Canada; 43.7221°N 79.4103°W

Information
- School type: High School
- Motto: Amor Doctrinae Floreat (Let the love of learning flourish)
- Founded: 1936
- School board: Toronto District School Board (Toronto Board of Education)
- Superintendent: Cassandra Alviani-Alvarez
- Area trustee: Shelley Laskin
- Principal: Lorraine Sutherns
- Grades: 9 - 12
- Enrolment: 1167 (2019-2020)
- Language: English, French Immersion, Extended French
- Schedule type: Semestered
- Colours: Gold and Blue
- Mascot: Panther
- Team name: Lawrence Park Panthers
- Website: www.lawrenceparkcollegiateinstitute.ca
- Last updated: April 17, 2025

Lawrence Park Collegiate Institute is a semestered, public high school institution with over 1,267 students enrolled. The school is located in Toronto, Ontario, Canada. It teaches grades 9 through 12 and is operated and governed by the Toronto District School Board. Until 1998, the school was part of the former Toronto Board of Education.

The school is located in the Lytton Park neighbourhood. The majority of students come from the surrounding Bedford Park, Lytton Park, North Toronto, and Lawrence Park areas. The closest TTC subway station is Lawrence station.

== History ==
Lawrence Park Collegiate was founded in 1936. Charles W. Robb was the school's first principal and went on to become the Superintendent of Secondary Education for Toronto. The current principal is Lorraine Sutherns.

== Drama ==
Lawrence Park has a very large and active Drama Council that is responsible for various events at the school. The council plans and runs the Remembrance Day assembly. Each year the council runs United Artists for a Cause, a performing arts night that includes music, drama and a fashion show. Lawrence Park is one of few schools that enters 2 plays in the NTS (formerly Sears) drama festival in addition to hosting the festival. In 2025, one of its submitted productions for NTS, "Kaleidoscope" (originally written by Ray Bradbury), advanced to the provincials level, winning a Mira Award for Sound Design and Production.

Each year, there is a school play performed for hundreds of people including Arsenic and Old Lace (2016), Departures and Arrivals (2017) and Anne of Green Gables (2018). Dramatic productions take place in a very large and recently upgraded auditorium with a new LED lighting system installed in 2017. "Masquerade," a school magazine, showcases the music, drama and visual arts programs at Lawrence Park Collegiate.

== Notable alumni ==
- Liam Hicks professional baseball player

== See also ==
- Education in Ontario
- List of secondary schools in Ontario
