= Canada Square (Toronto) =

Office building complex in Toronto, Ontario, Canada

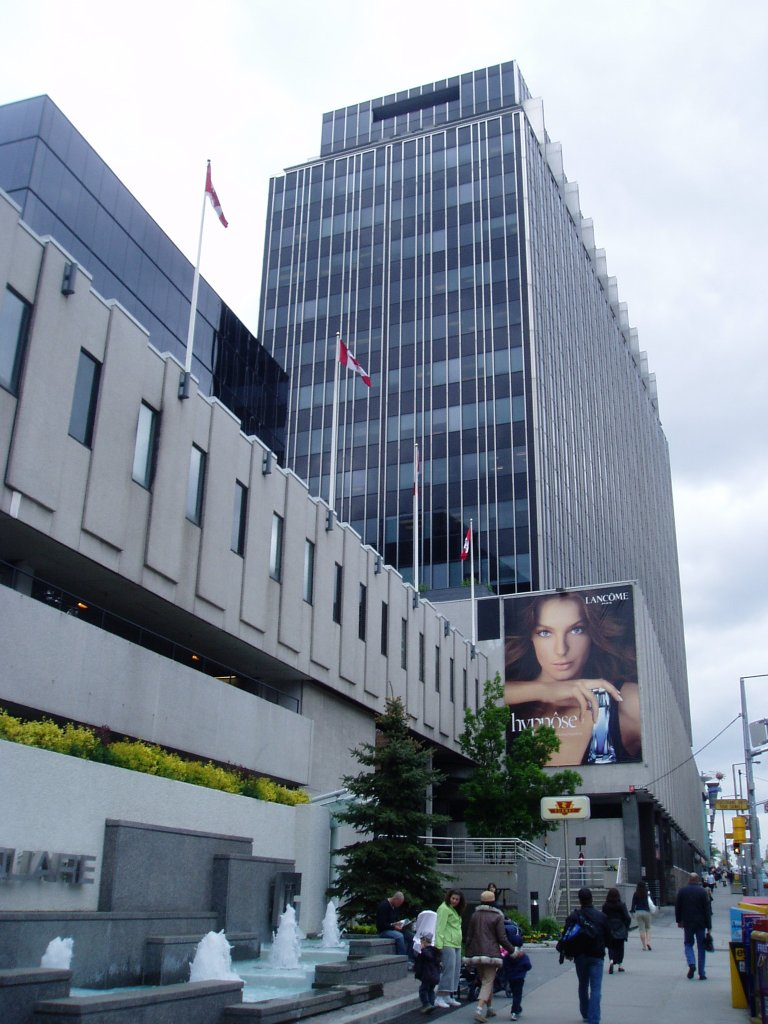
- Facing north on Yonge Street at 2190 Yonge (left) and 2200 Yonge (middle)
- Interactive map of the Canada Square area

General information
- Type: Commercial offices
- Location: Toronto, Ontario, 2200/2190/2180 Yonge Street, Toronto, ON, M4S 2C6
- Coordinates: 2200 Yonge: 43.70603°N 79.39850°W; 2190 Yonge: 43.70541°N 79.39862°W; 2180 Yonge: 43.70465°N 79.39817°W
- Completed: 2200 Yonge: 1962; 2190 Yonge: 1987; 2180 Yonge: 1972

Technical details
- Floor count: 2200 Yonge: 17; 2190 Yonge: 6; 2180 Yonge: 18
- Floor area: 2200 Yonge: 259,397 square feet (24,099 m^{2}); 2190 Yonge: 151,021 square feet (14,030 m^{2}); 2180 Yonge: 402,277 square feet (37,373 m^{2})

Design and construction
- Architect: Kenneth Raymond Cooper

Canada Square is a complex of three interconnected office buildings located at Yonge and Eglinton in Toronto, Ontario, Canada, including a small shopping concourse. The two main towers are examples of International Style.

The complex's largest tenant is Canadian Tire, which has offices in all three buildings and its head office at 2180 Yonge Street. It is located right next to entrances to the Eglinton station on the Line 1 Yonge-University subway line, and it is also served by the Line 5 Eglinton light rail line.

== Buildings ==
=== 2200 Yonge Street ===
2200 Yonge Street is located directly above the Toronto Transit Commission's Eglinton station and has connecting passages to the station as well as to the Yonge Eglinton Centre across the street. The building was built in 1962 and has 17 floors. It has 259,397 square feet (24,099 m^{2}) of space. The building's major tenants are Canadian Tire, Procom Consultants, and the headquarters of the YMCA of Greater Toronto.

=== 2190 Yonge Street ===
2190 Yonge Street was built in 1987 with 6 floors and 151,021 square feet (14,030 m^{2}) of space. Its major tenant is Canadian Tire. It also previously had a Cineplex movie theatre which closed after the end of business on October 24, 2021.

=== 2180 Yonge Street ===
2180 Yonge Street was built in 1972 with 18 floors and 402,277 square feet (37,373 m^{2}) of space. Its major tenants are Canadian Tire's head office and TVO.

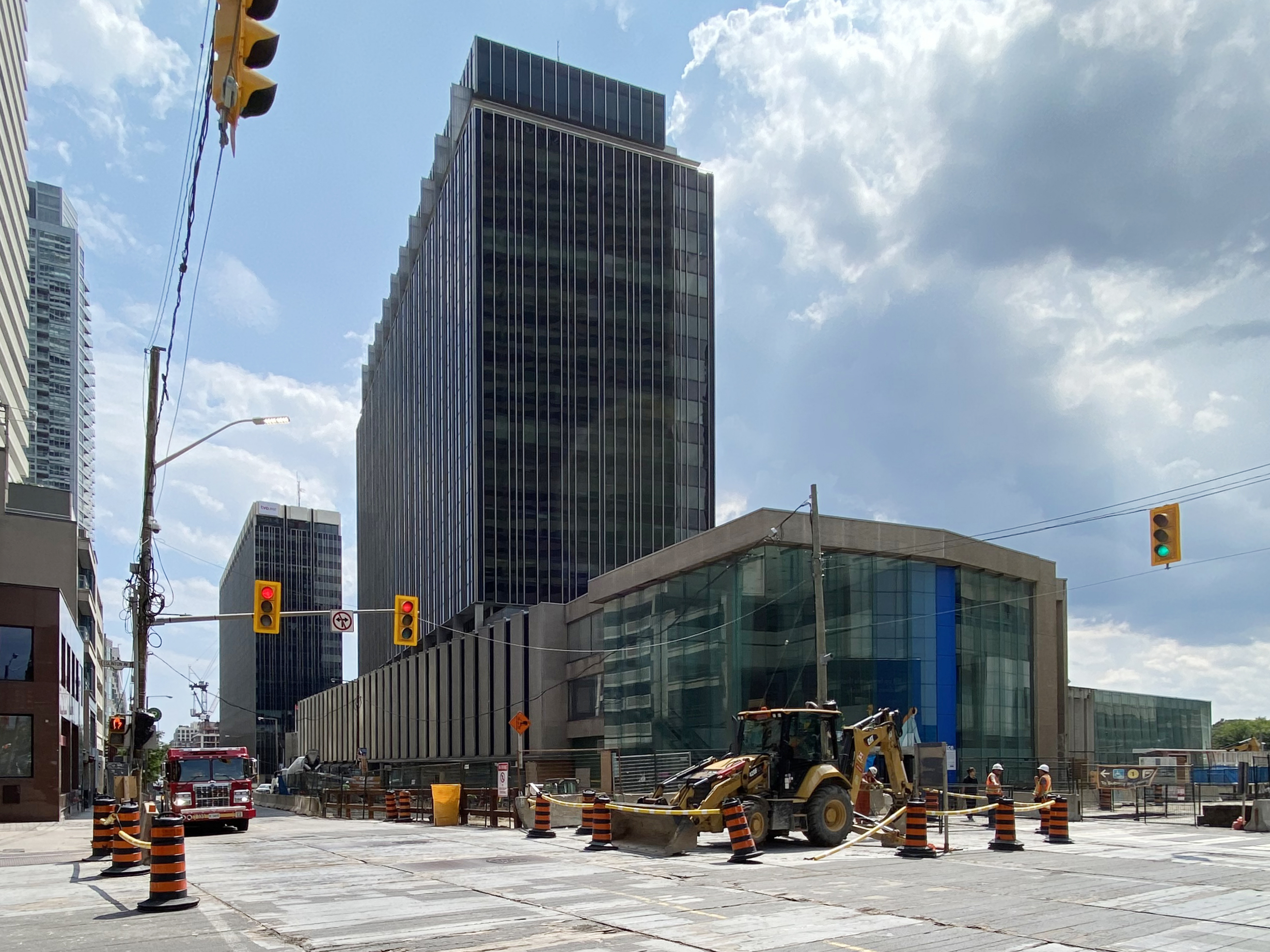
Exterior of 2200 Yonge St

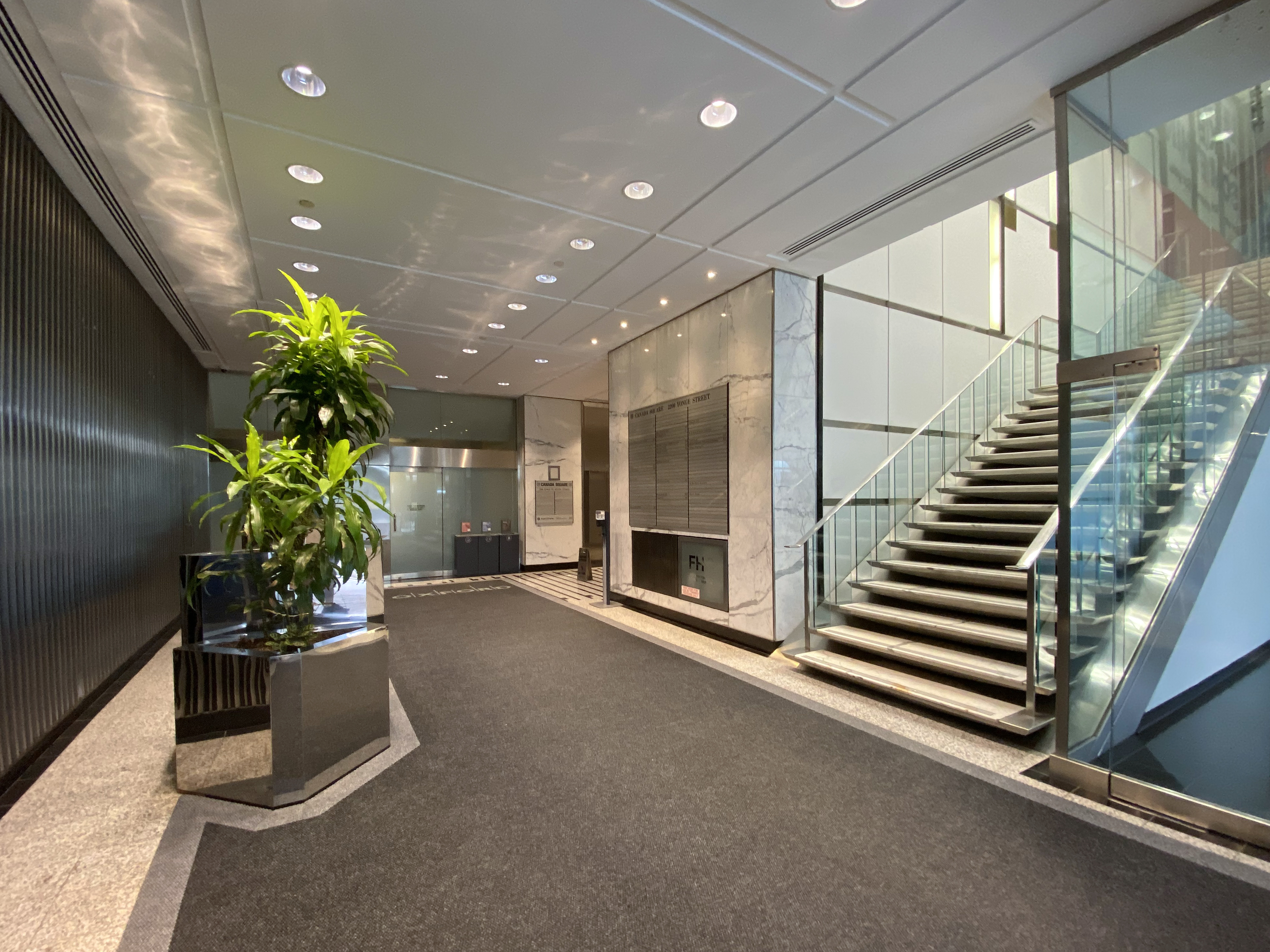
2200 Yonge St office lobby

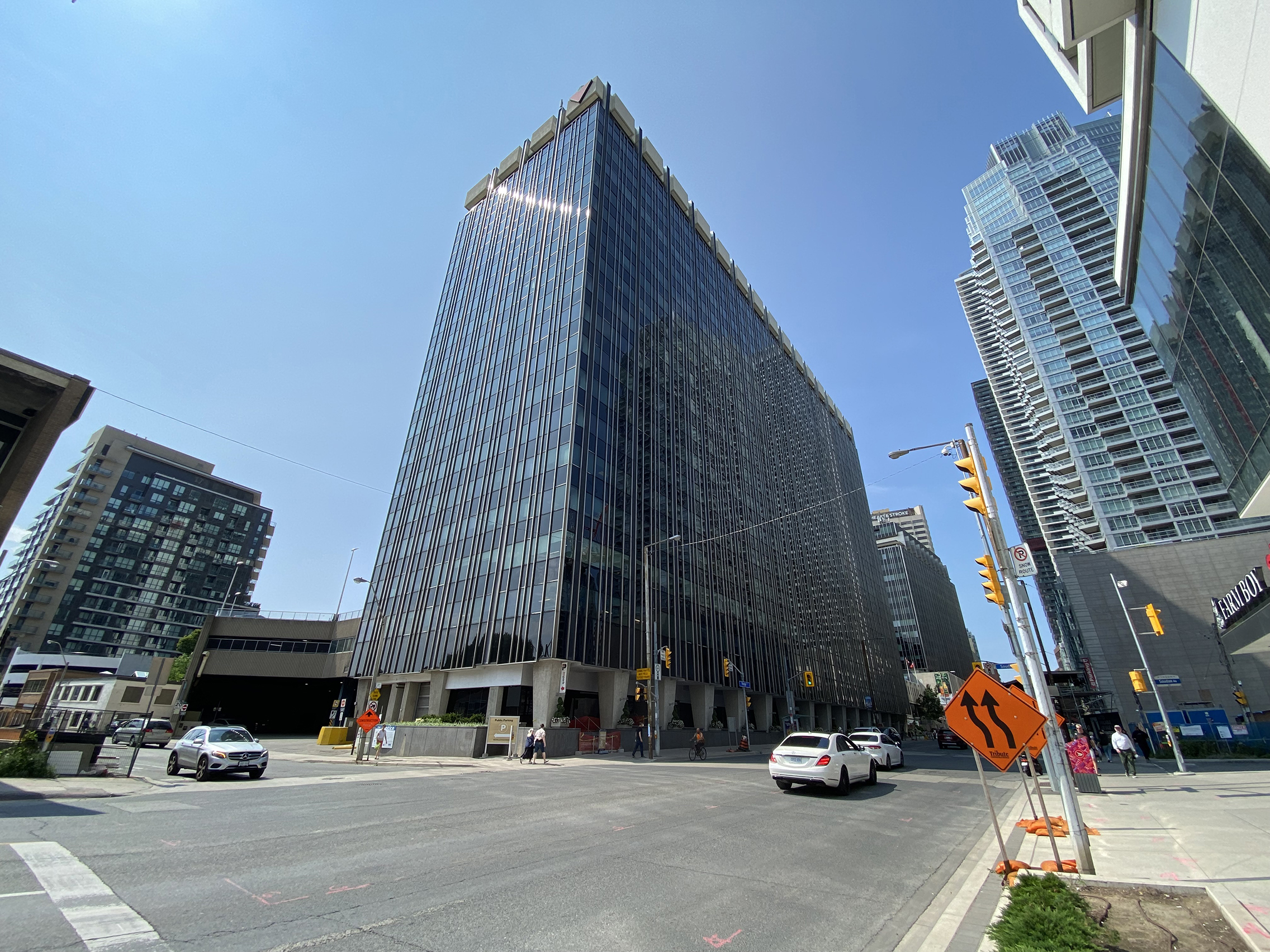
Exterior of 2180 Yonge St
