= Eglinton station =

Toronto subway station

Eglinton
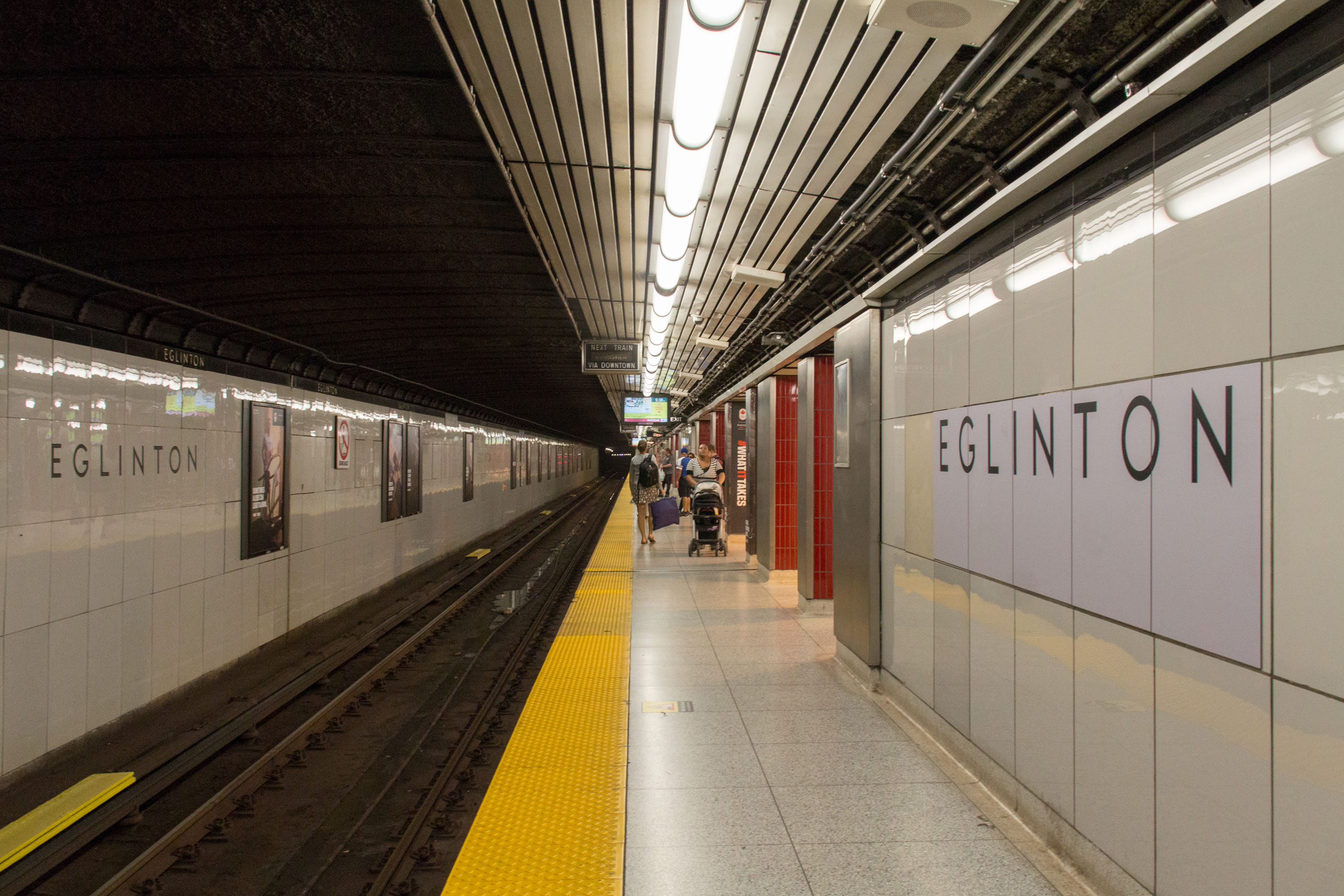
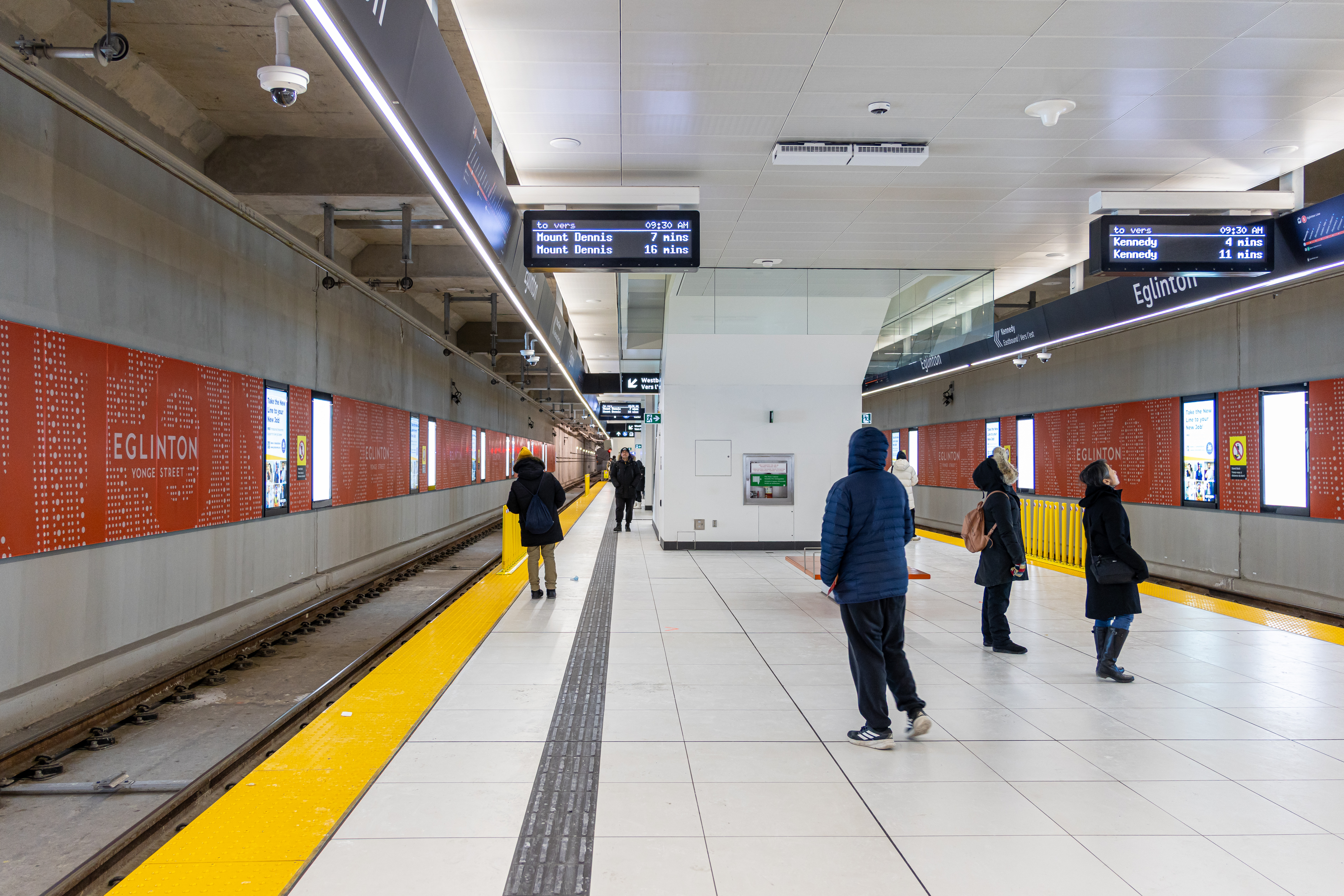
- Line 1 platform Line 5 platform

General information
- Location: 2190 Yonge Street; Toronto, Ontario; Canada
- Coordinates: 43°42′22″N 79°23′55″W
- Platforms: Centre platform
- Tracks: 2 (Line 1); 2 (Line 5)
- Connections: TTC buses: 13 Avenue Rd; 34 Eglinton; 61 Avenue Rd North; 74 Mount Pleasant; 97 Yonge; 103 Mount Pleasant North; 320 Yonge; 334 Eglinton; 354 Lawrence East

Construction
- Structure type: Underground
- Accessible: Yes
- Architect: Arcadis (Line 5)

Other information
- Website: Official station page

History
- Opened: March 30, 1954; 72 years ago (Line 1); February 8, 2026; 8 months ago (Line 5)
- Rebuilt: 2004 (Line 1); 2023 (Line 1)

Passengers
- 2023–2024: 60,814
- Rank: 7 of 70

Services
Preceding station	Toronto Transit Commission	Following station
Davisville towards Vaughan	Line 1 Yonge–University	Lawrence towards Finch
Avenue towards Mount Dennis	Line 5 Eglinton	Mount Pleasant towards Kennedy
Location

Eglinton is a Toronto subway station serving Line 1 Yonge–University and Line 5 Eglinton in Toronto, Ontario, Canada. Located on Eglinton Avenue, it is situated in the centre of the Yonge–Eglinton neighbourhood in Midtown Toronto. Eglinton station is the seventh busiest station of the Toronto Transit Commission (TTC).

== Description ==
=== Station levels ===
The station has six levels:

- Level 1: Street
- Level 2: Concourse
- Level 3: Line 1 platform, east intermediate concourse, west intermediate concourse
- Level 4: Upper concourse
- Level 5: Lower concourse
- Level 6: Line 5 platform

The concourse on level 2 is part of the original 1954 station. At its north end, customers must pass through a set of fare gates to access the Line 1 platform (level 3) below. The concourse connects with the station's bus terminal and a secondary entrance at the south end. It also has several shops.

Level 3 is divided into three sections: the Line 1 platform, east intermediate concourse and west intermediate concourse. Both sections of the intermediate concourse are slightly lower than the Line 1 platform level. There is no horizontal pathway between the three sections of level 3. On the east and west concourses, customers must pass through fare gates to proceed to the upper concourse (level 4).

The upper concourse (level 4) runs under the Line 1 tracks and platform, and gives access to both the Line 1 and Line 5 platforms on levels 3 and 6 respectively. Passengers must descend to the lower concourse (level 5) to be able to access Line 5 (level 6) if they are on level 4.

=== Bus terminal ===
The Eglinton station bus terminal is located at the south side of the station. The terminal's platforms and bus loop lie mostly within the building of a former bus garage. There is a station entrance and waiting room at the northeast corner of the bus terminal. From this entrance, passengers can descend to the Line 1 platform, and from the waiting room passengers can walk along a passageway connecting the bus terminal to the upper concourse just above the Line 1 platforms. Platforms on the south side of the terminal serve eastbound bus routes while those on the northside serve westbound routes. Buses can enter the terminal from either Berwick Avenue or Duplex Avenue.

=== Entrances ===
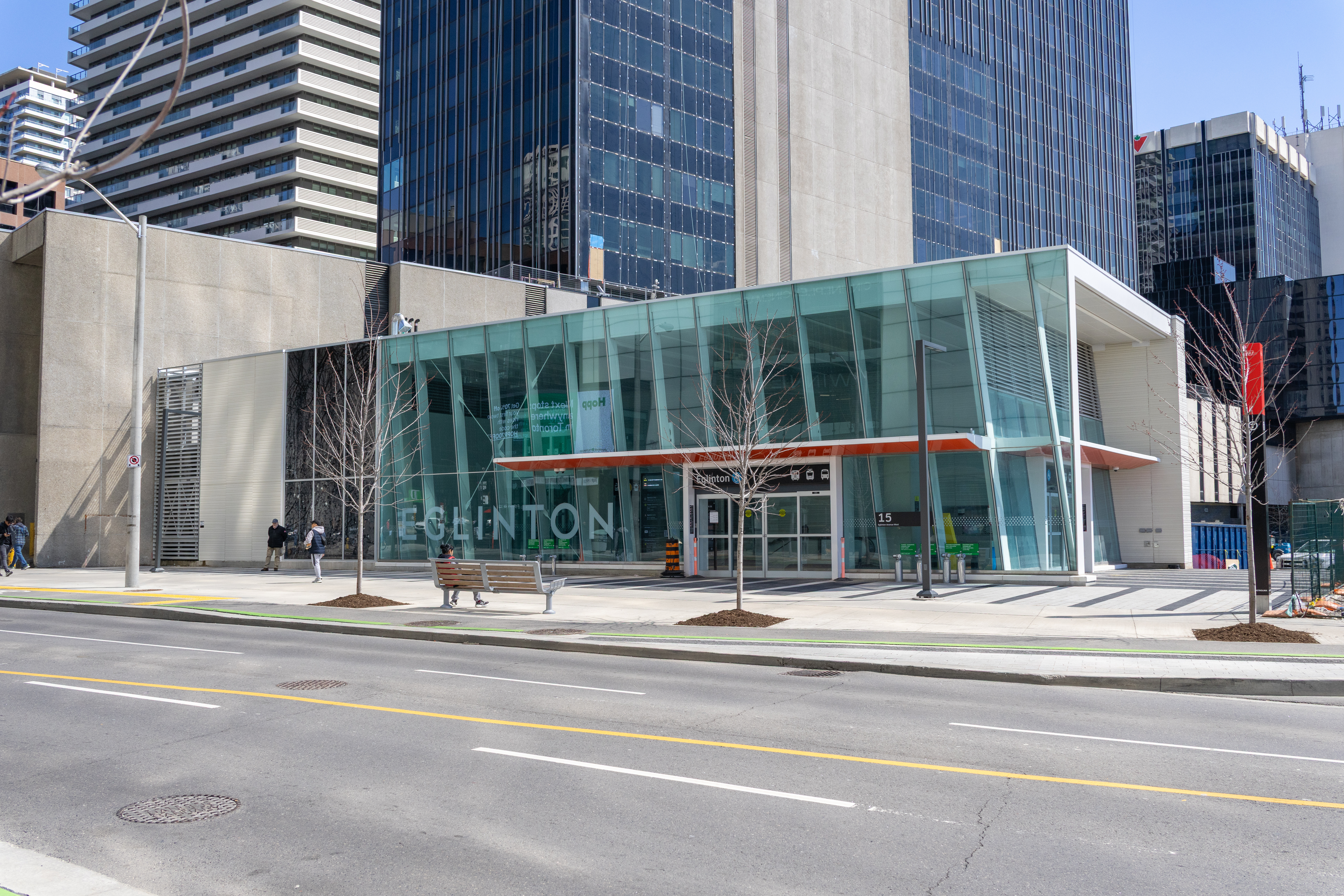
The southwest entrance to Eglinton station, constructed as part of the Line 5 project

There are six entrances to the station in the surrounding area:

- An entrance at the southwest corner of Yonge Street and Eglinton Avenue (Canada Square)
- An accessible entrance adjacent to and on the west side of the "Canada Square" entrance
- An entrance at the southeast corner of Yonge Street and Eglinton Avenue, at the CIBC
- An accessible entrance from the basement food court of Yonge Eglinton Centre at the northwest corner of Yonge Street and Eglinton Avenue
- An accessible entrance from e-Place just east of the northeast corner of Yonge Street and Eglinton Avenue
- An accessible entrance on Yonge Street, north of Berwick Avenue, which leads directly to the bus platform level

=== Public art ===
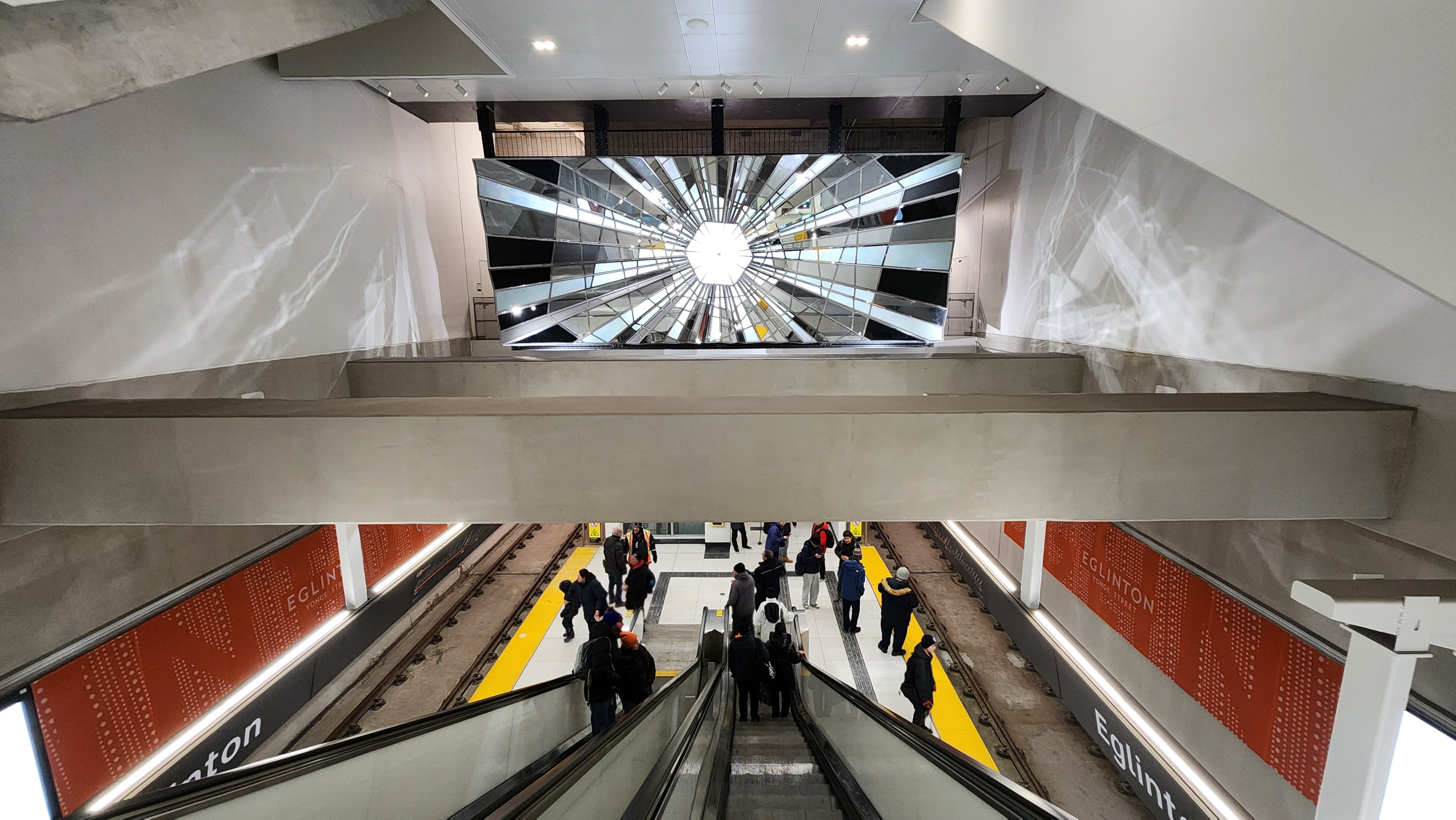
Light from Within, public art by Rodney LaTourelle and Louise Witthöft, over the escalators to Line 5

As part of a program to install artworks at six of the stations along Line 5 Eglinton, Eglinton station features an artwork titled Light from Within by artists Rodney LaTourelle and Louise Witthöft. The artwork is installed above the escalators leading down to the Line 5 platform. The 13-ton panel is made of mirrored glass tiles and is inspired by minerals, crystals and gemstones evoking the "subterranean nature of rapid transit", according to the artists.

=== Line 1 features ===
The Line 1 platform is part of the original 1954 station, making Eglinton station the only one of the original 1954 subway stations (Eglinton to Union on Line 1) to retain its original vitreous marble wall tiles. The other 1954 stations used similar wall tiles, with variations in colour schemes, but these were replaced due to deterioration.

The Line 1 tracks approach the station from the south in an open cut before going underground at the Berwick Portal immediately before the station. Here the tracks divide sharply to go either side of the island platform. There is a diamond crossover at this location, from when the station was the terminus of the line to reverse trains. North of the station, the line swings to the east, to run directly under Yonge Street in a bored tunnel.

=== Line 5 features ===
The Line 5 platform level is the deepest level of the station complex and has an island platform. Beyond the station and the diamond crossover to the east, the line runs in bored tunnels.

== History ==
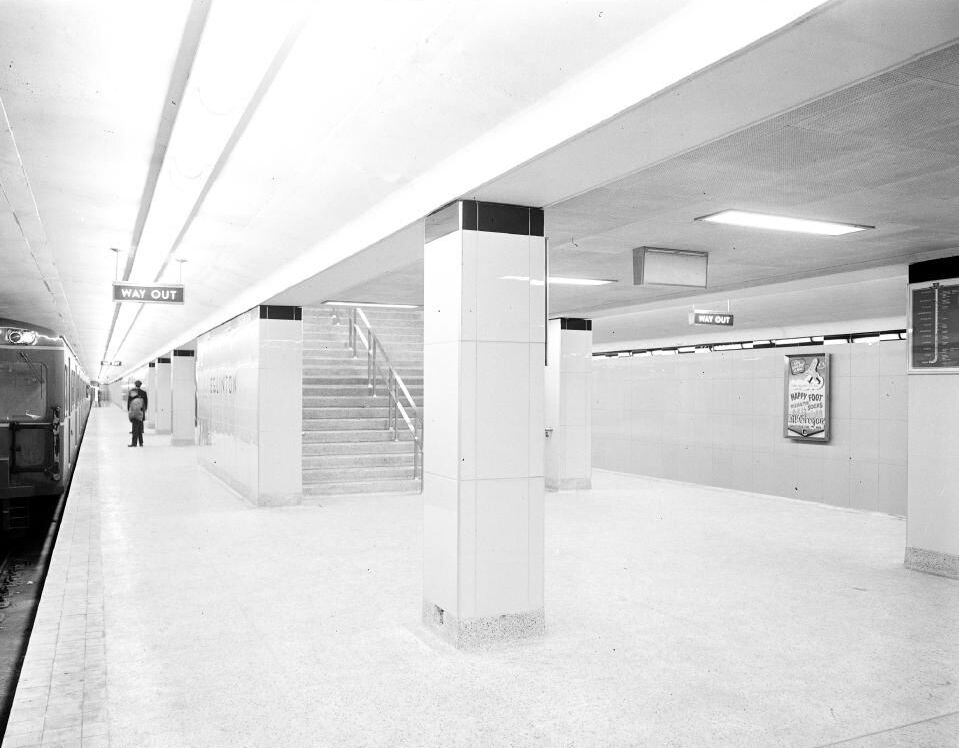
Subway platform in 1954

Eglinton station opened in 1954 as the northern terminus of the original Yonge subway line, today the eastern arm of Line 1 Yonge–University. In 1954, the Yonge subway ran from Eglinton station to Union station, and replaced the Yonge streetcar line. Eglinton station sits on the site of the former Eglinton Carhouse, a streetcar facility opened in 1922, partly closed in 1951 to construct the subway line, and fully closed in 1954.

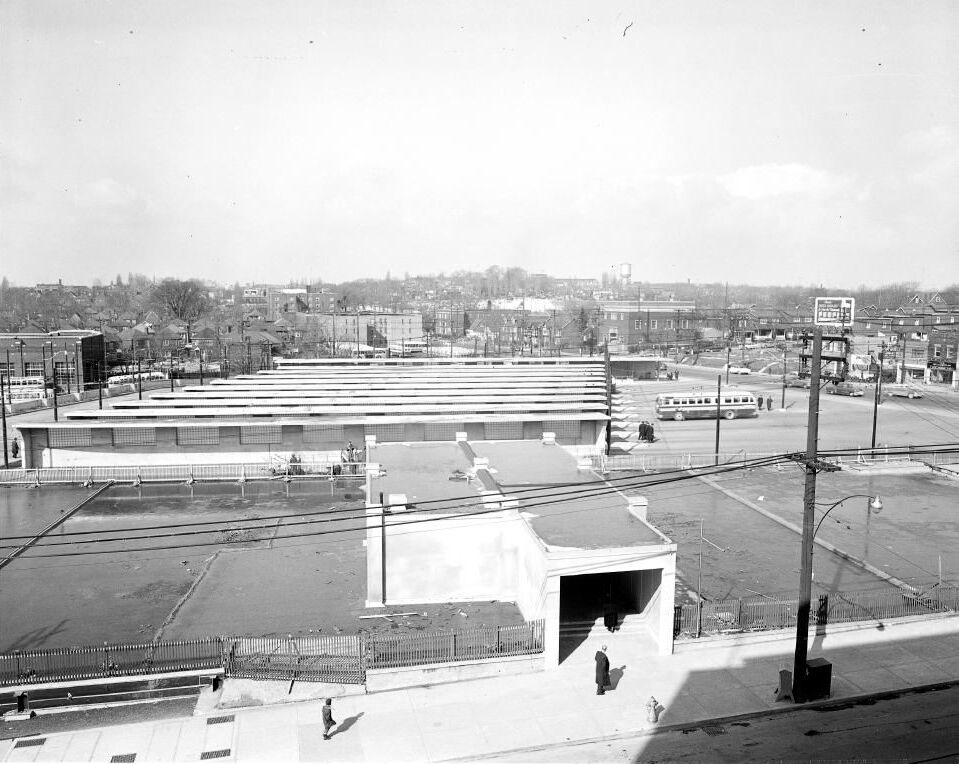
Original bus terminal platforms in 1954

When opened in 1954, Eglinton station had a different bus terminal from what exists today. Eglinton's first bus terminal was located at the south side of Eglinton Avenue, just north of the current bus terminal. It initially had nine parallel bays within the fare-paid zone, each with a covered platform and staircases leading down to an east–west, underground concourse. There was also a platform 10 outside the fare-paid zone. In 1963, platforms 11–13 were added on the west side of platform 10 to handle increasing suburban traffic. The bus terminal had its own street entrance facing Eglinton Avenue at the north end of platform 10, about 50 metres east of Duplex Avenue.

With its opening in 1954, Eglinton station was served by the TTC trolley bus system, with service to neighbourhoods north of Eglinton Avenue. One bay was for 97 Yonge trolley buses to Glen Echo Loop, and two bays were for 61 Nortown trolley buses with separate bays for eastbound and westbound trips. The Nortown route was U-shaped serving Mount Pleasant Road east of the station, and Avenue Road to the west. The Eglinton garage, at the site of today's Eglinton station bus terminal, serviced trolley buses as well as diesel buses.

In 1973, Line 1 was extended to York Mills station and Eglinton station ceased to be a terminal station. Along with the extension, a pocket track was installed on the north side of the station to reverse some Line 1 trains. Also with the extension, Glen Echo Loop was closed and the Yonge trolley bus route was converted to diesel. This left Nortown as the only trolley bus route serving Eglinton station.

In 1991, the Nortown trolley bus route was converted to diesel, ending trolley bus service at Eglinton station.

The adjacent Eglinton bus garage, which was located south of the bus terminal, was closed and relocated to the new facility on Comstock Road on the former Scarborough Van Assembly site in 2002.

In 2004, the original bus terminal from 1954 was closed because of safety concerns over its aging infrastructure. A replacement bus terminal was opened in the former bus garage just south of the old bus terminal.

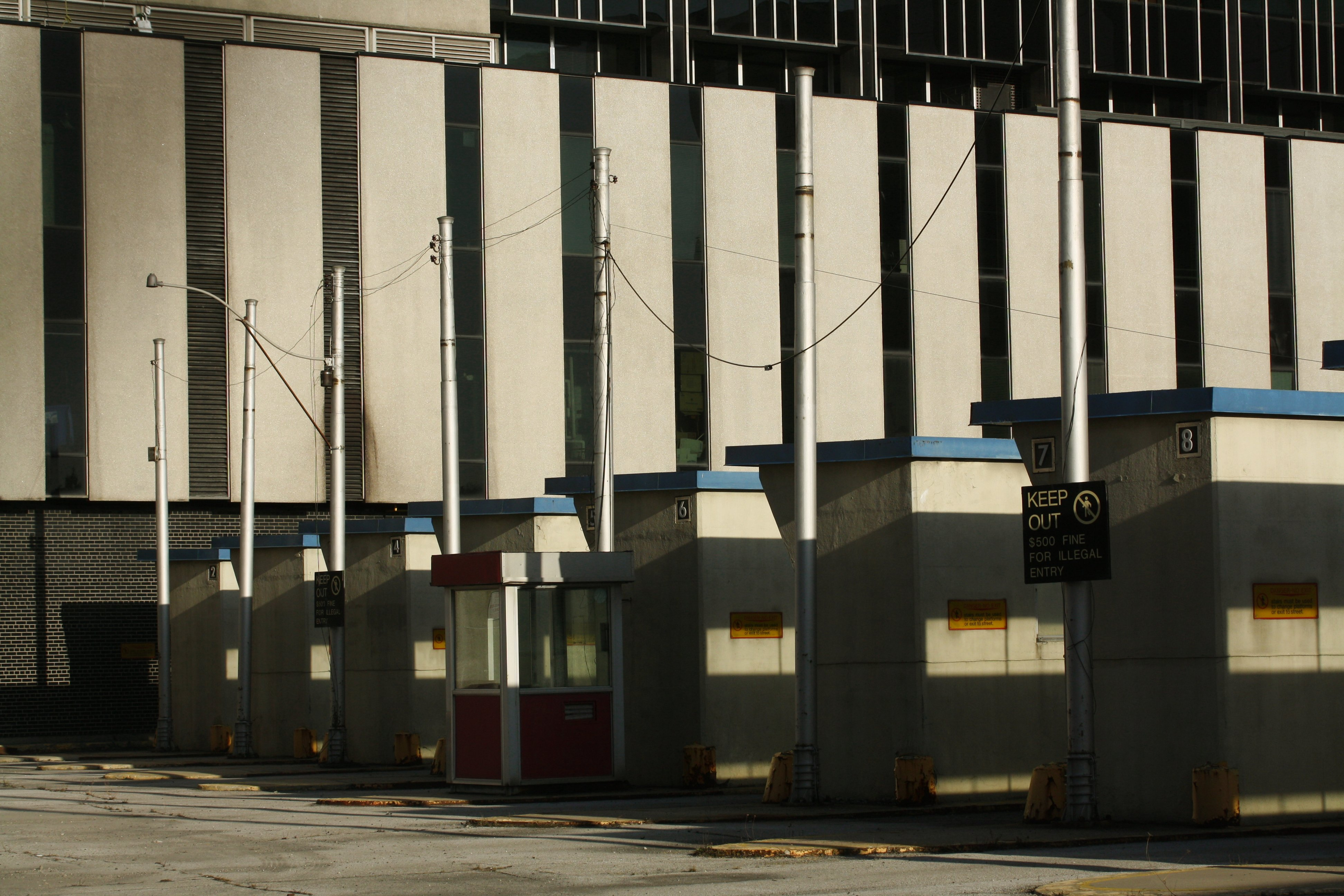
The original open air bus platforms were reached by individual stairwells from the concourse.

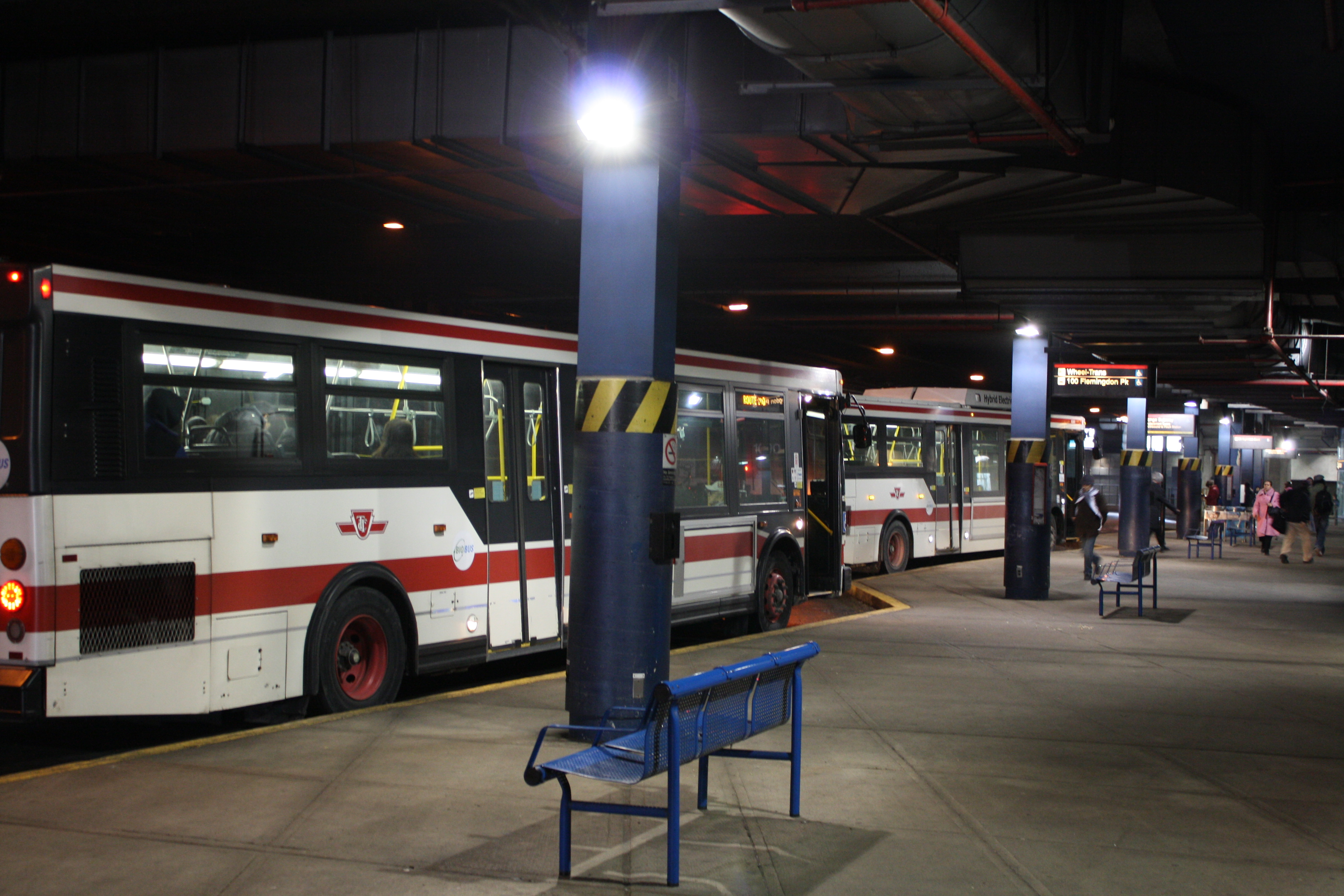
The new bus bay area is located at ground level under the Canada Square building.

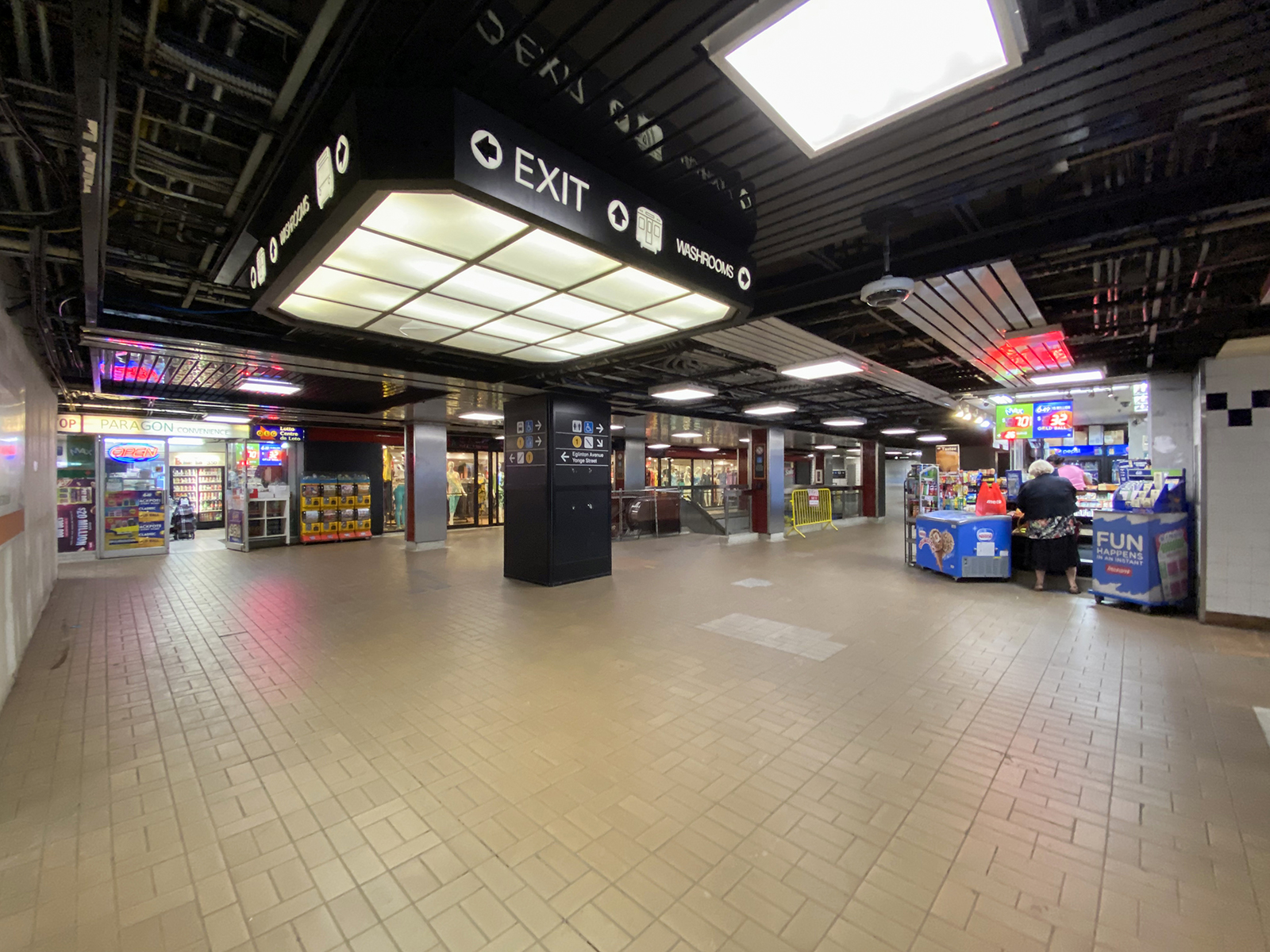
Eglinton station concourse in 2023

In 2004, this station became accessible with the addition of elevators, and also with the closure of the old bus terminal which had required passengers to use stairs to reach the buses.

In 2016, the original bus terminal from 1954 was demolished to make way for construction of Line 5.

On November 17, 2016, Eglinton became the last station on Line 1 to be Presto enabled.

In October 2021, automatic train control (ATC) was extended to Eglinton station. On May 14, 2023, the northern platform extension on Line 1 opened. ATC had been adjusted the previous day so that trains stopped 24 metres (79 ft) further north. The southern 24 metres of the platform was closed off for passenger boarding and disembarking.

Until the opening of Line 5, Eglinton station had a simpler three-level configuration consisting of street level, concourse level (now the upper concourse) and the Yonge subway platform level. Until 2017, there were four entrances at each of the corners at the intersection of Yonge Street and Eglinton Avenue. The main entrance was at the southeast corner, with tunnels connecting the other entrances to the concourse level. (These tunnels were all closed for demolition and replacement as part of the station expansion for Line 5.) The fare gates were at the entrance to the concourse, and both the concourse and connecting bus terminal were in the fare-paid zone.

=== Line 5 construction ===
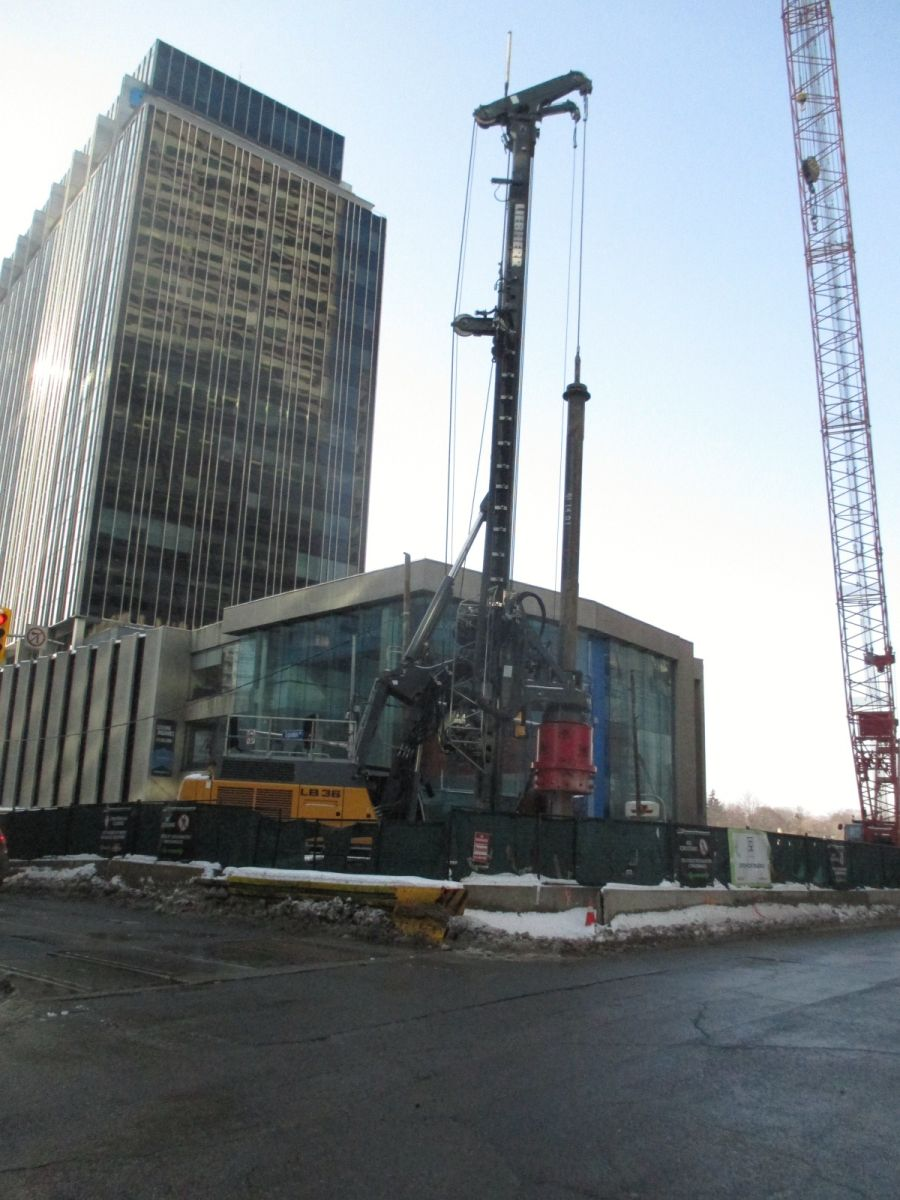
Machine boring holes for Line 5 station sidewalls at existing station entrance in February 2018

Twenty-four weekend closures of Line 1 at Eglinton station were scheduled for 2018 alone for construction activities related to Line 5. The first closure was scheduled for February 10 and 11, 2018.

Structures constructed at Eglinton station as part of the Line 5 project were:

- Main entrance to Line 5 located just west of the existing and retained station entrance at the southwest corner of Eglinton Avenue and Yonge Street
- Replacement entrances at the northwest, northeast and southeast corners of the intersection of Yonge Street and Eglinton Avenue connecting to underground concourses
- Line 5 platforms with rails laid 22 metres (72 ft) below ground
- Separate lower concourse for Line 5 at a lower level than the Line 1 platform
- Northward extension of the existing Line 1 platform, providing room for escalator/elevator access down to the Line 5 concourse level
- Emergency exit and ventilation shaft at 7 Eglinton Avenue East in a four-story structure to also be used as a Salvation Army church
- Facility services building located over the Line 1 portal at Berwick Avenue, housing a ventilation capable of emergency smoke extraction

In November 2013, the TTC originally proposed to shift the current Line 1 platform approximately 70 metres (230 ft) northward of its current location. Such a change would have allowed smoother flows of passenger traffic between the platforms for Lines 1 and 5, and avoided a situation where all transferring passengers are bottlenecked by only one transfer path, similar to the busy Bloor–Yonge station. The pocket track at the north end of the station would have had to be abandoned. However, this proposal was modified by March 2018 to shift the Line 1 platform north by only 24 metres (79 ft), allowing the pocket track to be retained. In the new area there will be an elevator and escalators down to the Line 5 concourse. At the south end of the platform, the elevator and stairs to the south station entrance would be retained but the platform edge would be walled off in this area. The northern platform extension opened on May 14, 2023.

Line 5 Eglinton opened on February 8, 2026, along with the new upper and lower concourse levels.

== Nearby landmarks ==
There are several high-rise buildings at or near the corner of Yonge Street and Eglinton Avenue. Built directly over the station is the Canada Square Complex, which is home to TVOntario studios and the head offices of Canadian Tire. Yonge Eglinton Centre is at the northwest corner of Yonge and Eglinton. Further south is the residential Minto Midtown. Another nearby destination is Eglinton Park, west of Eglinton station.

== Surface connections ==
TTC routes serving the station include:

Eglinton station surface transit connections
Bay number	Route	Name	Additional information
1	Spare		
2	97C	Yonge	Southbound to Union station
3	13A	Avenue Rd	Southbound to Queen's Park
3	13B	Avenue Rd	Southbound to Gerrard Street
4	61	Avenue Rd North	Northbound to Highway 401
4	Wheel-Trans		
5	Spare		
6	34	Eglinton	Westbound to Mount Dennis station
7	34	Eglinton	Eastbound to Kennedy station
8	103	Mount Pleasant North	Northbound to Doncliffe Drive
9	74	Mount Pleasant	Southbound to St. Clair station
N/A	97A	Yonge	Northbound to Steeles Avenue and southbound to St. Clair station (Vehicles do not enter the station)
N/A	97B	Yonge	Northbound to Steeles Avenue via Yonge Boulevard and southbound to St. Clair station via Yonge Boulevard (Vehicles do not enter the station)
N/A	320	Yonge	Blue Night service; northbound to Steeles Avenue and southbound to Queens Quay (Vehicles do not enter the station)
N/A	334A	Eglinton	Blue Night service; eastbound to Kennedy station and westbound to Renforth Drive and Pearson Airport (Vehicles do not enter the station)
N/A	334B	Eglinton	Blue Night service; eastbound to Finch Avenue East and Neilson Road via Morningside Avenue and westbound to Mount Dennis station (Vehicles do not enter the station)
N/A	354	Lawrence East	Blue Night service; eastbound to Starspray Boulevard

== See also ==
- Yonge–Eglinton
