= Fairbank, Toronto =

Fairbank
- Neighbourhood
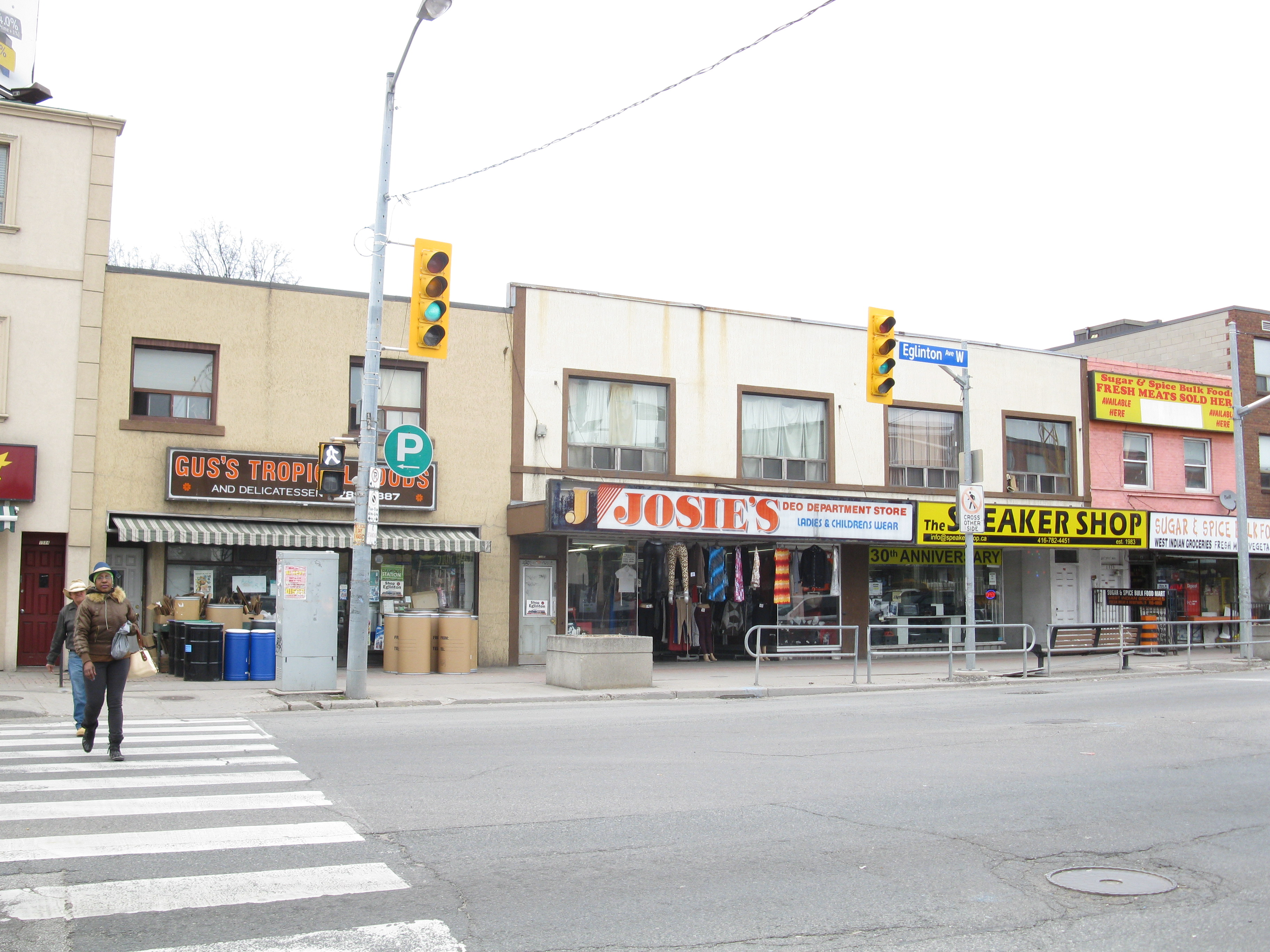
- View of Fairbank from Oakwood and Eglinton Avenue before the construction of Oakwood station

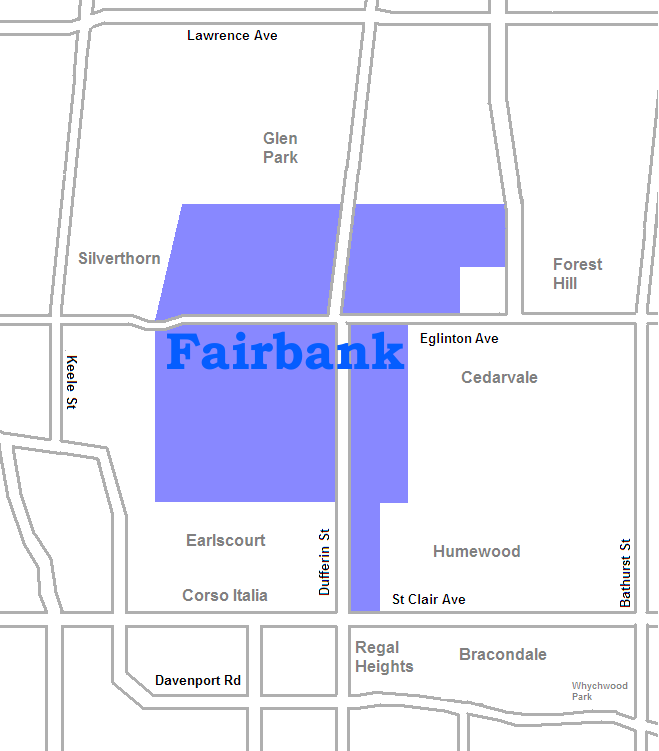
- Vicinity

- Location within Toronto
- Coordinates: 43°41′44″N 79°27′00″W
- Country: Canada
- Province: Ontario
- City: Toronto
- Established: 1850 (York Township)
- Established community: 1891 (Postal village)
- Changed municipality: 1998 Toronto from York

Fairbank is a neighbourhood in Toronto, Ontario, Canada. The area is centred on the intersection of Dufferin Street and Eglinton Avenue West. Fairbank includes the neighbourhoods of Briar Hill–Belgravia (North of Eglinton Avenue West) and Caledonia–Fairbank (South of Eglinton Avenue West). The western border is the CNR lines. The northern and southern borders are the former borders of the City of York and the eastern border is Dufferin Street (Oakwood Village).

== History ==
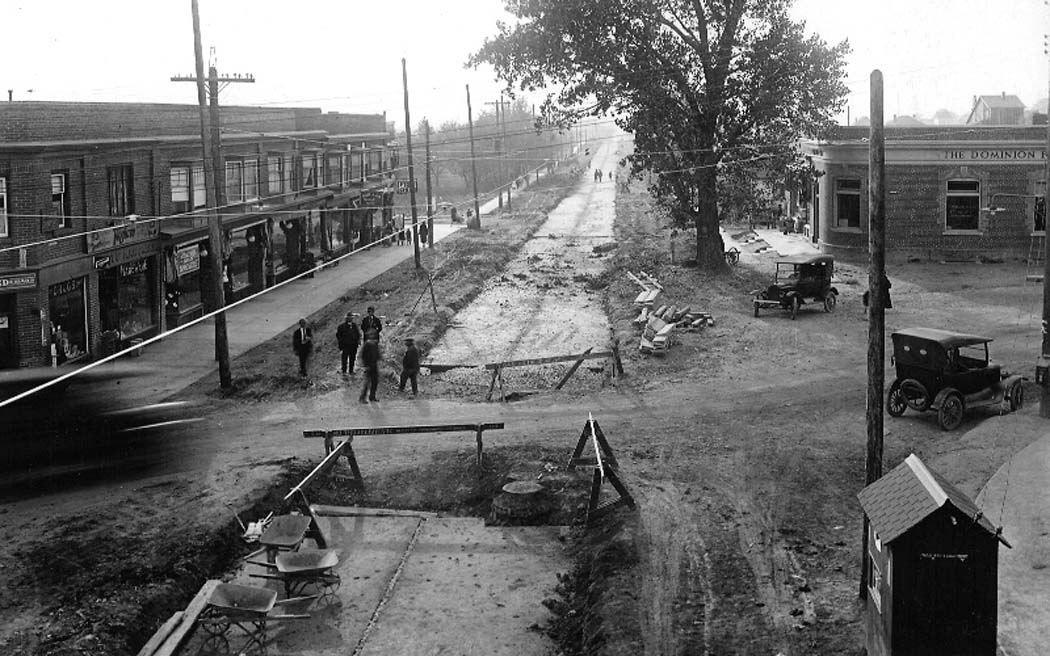
View of Fairbank from Dufferin Street and Eglinton Avenue, 1924.

The area began at the Fairbank Postal Village at the intersection of Vaughan Road (an early settler's street crossing through farmland on the way to Vaughan Township) at Eglinton and Dufferin Street. The postal village name was derived from the Fairbank Farm owned by English settler Matthew Parsons (and named by his father-in-law Jacob Mackay).

St Hilda's Anglican church (St. Hilda's Retirement Residence, added in 1975) was built at the Fairbank intersection, although a cul-de-sac was later created at the northern end of Vaughan Road to simplify the Eglinton and Dufferin intersection when Eglinton Avenue began to develop as a commercial street with many mid-rise apartment buildings.

== Character ==
The neighbourhood has many rolling hills and steep, climbing streets. To the west, Prospect Cemetery separates Fairbank from development along the railway. Most of the neighbourhood as it exists today was planned in the interwar years (1920s & 1930s) with mostly small single family 2 and 1½ storey detached homes on north-south residential streets. Eglinton Ave. is organized into two BIAs: Fairbank Village and York-Eglinton. St. Clair Avenue to the south is organized into two BIAs: 'Corso Italia' and 'St. Clair Gardens'. The neighbour historically acts an extension of Corso Italia - having a heavy Italian influence, however is now heavily influenced and inhabited by Portuguese immigrants.

=== Districts ===
This neighbourhood contains several named areas:

- Caledonia covers the area along Caledonia Rd west of Prospect Cemetery and east of the railroad tracks. For demographic purposes the city has titled the neighbourhood Caledonia-Fairbanks. As of the 2006 Canadian Census, the total population of the Caledonia-Fairbank area was 3335, and as of the 2011 National Household survey, it was said to be 3230.
- North Fairbank is the area north of Eglinton and west of Dufferin.
- Belgravia is the portion of the neighbourhood east of Dufferin, north of Eglinton, and south of the former Belt Line, where the tracks have been removed as part of the York Beltline Trail. Belgravia has seen significant gentrification in recent years. It has become one of the most popular areas for first time buyers and families, because of its proximity to both the Subway Line and the Eglinton LRT Line that is anticipated to open in 2025. Belgraiva has a mix of older homes and newly built homes. It was voted one of the best places in Toronto to invest in real estate.
- Briar Hill is the area north of Belgravia and the Belt Line. The area's inhabitants are diverse; there is a very large Roman Catholic base, and Italian, Russian, and Portuguese are widely spoken as home languages. More than half of the immigrant population of Briar Hill-Belgravia arrived after 1981, with a majority of immigrants in 1996 and 2001 arriving from the Philippines, with Tagalog becoming a major immigrant language of the neighbourhood.
- Fairbank Village is the Business Improvement Area along Eglinton Ave. W. from Dufferin St. to Chamberlain Ave., as well as along Dufferin St. from Hunter Ave. to Schell Ave.
- York-Eglinton is the Business Improvement Area Along Eglinton Ave East of Dufferin St and extends to Marlee Ave.
- Eglinton West is a stretch of multicultural retail stores and restaurants along Eglinton.

=== Landmarks ===
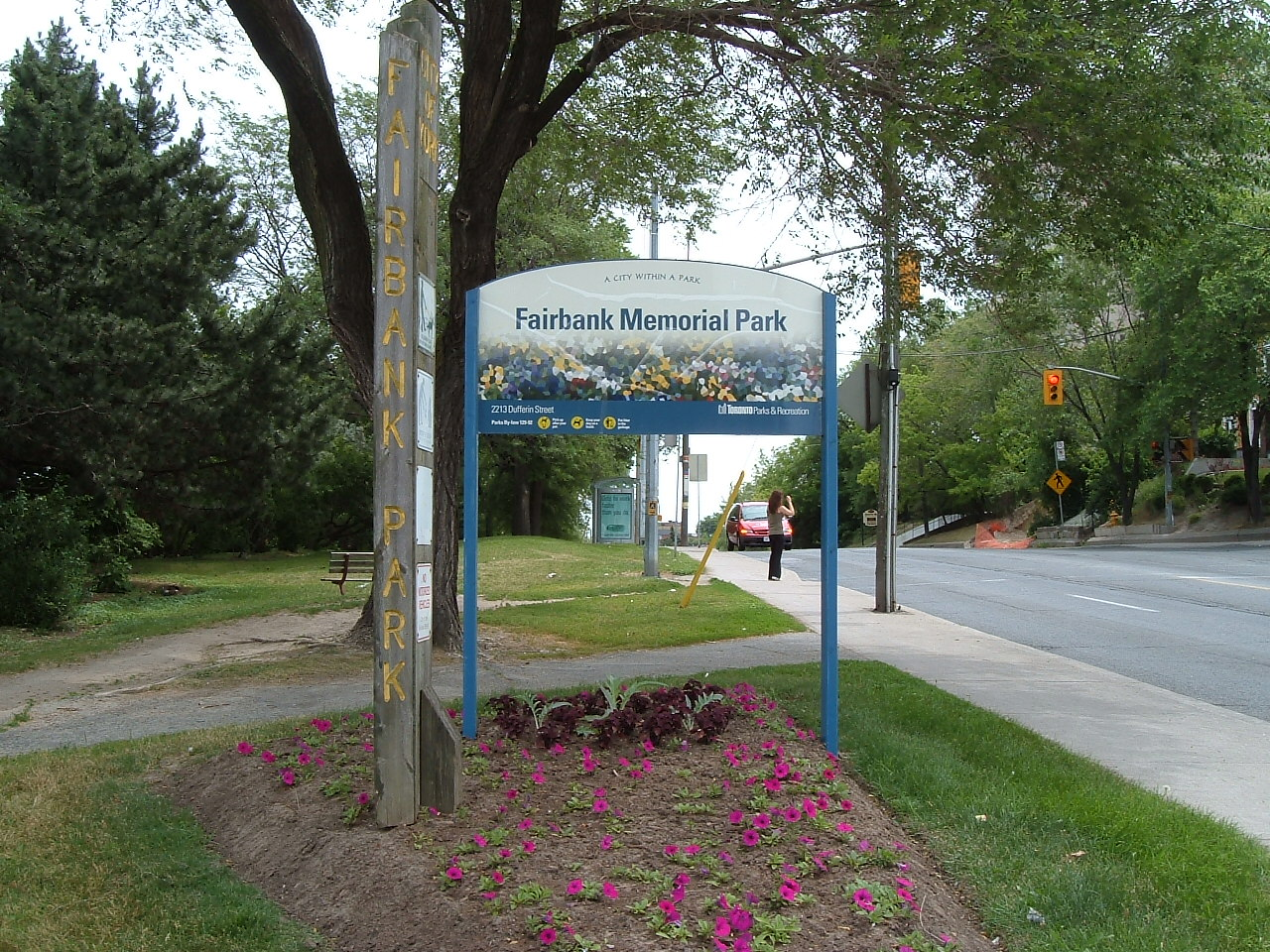
Fairbank Memorial Park is a major park in the neighbourhood.

- The main park is the Fairbank Memorial Park - built on land from Professor Dr. William Charles Gwynne (Gwynne Estate)
- Fairbank Memorial Park Community Centre
- Prospect Cemetery - opened for first burial in 1890 on William Sheilds farm
- Fairbank United Church 2750 Dufferin Street - built 1889 as Methodist Church and dates back to earlier church in 1844; became United Church in 1925

== Demographics ==
According to the 2006 census, the majority of the neighbourhood's population is Roman Catholic (over 65%), and there are a large number of people who speak Portuguese and Italian, with many recognizable ethnic influences in the neighbourhood. As of the 2011 National Household survey, the population was divided into 37% Portuguese, 6% Italian, 2% Spanish, with the remaining 55% being of other Southern European origins, compared to the 75% of Portuguese reported in the 2006 census. The neighbourhood is inhabited mostly by first generation Canadians (76%).

== Education ==
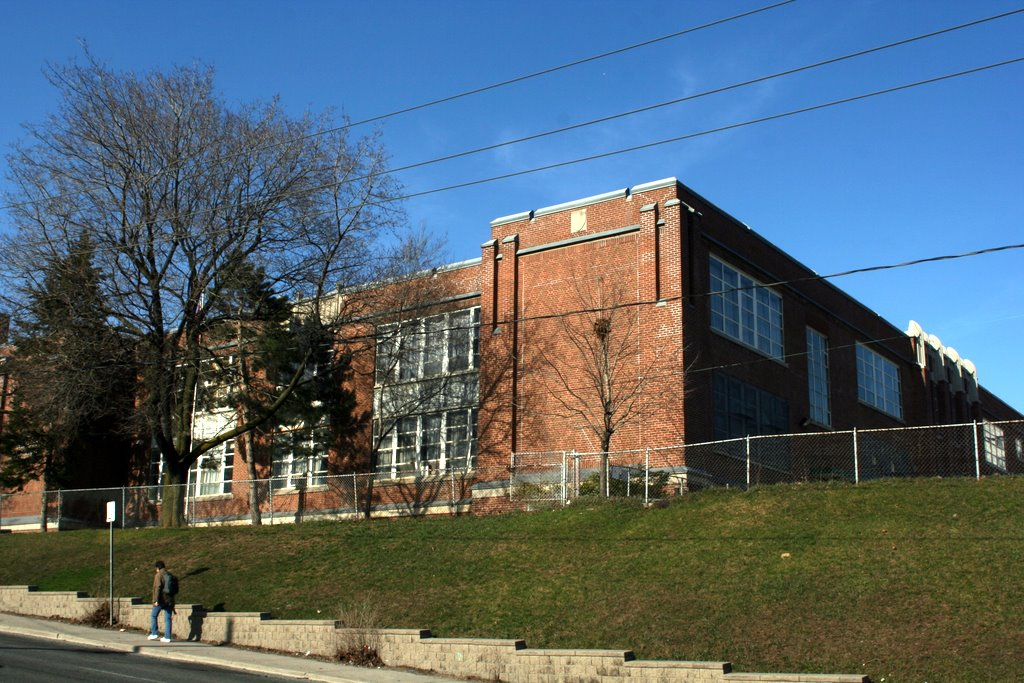
Lycée Français de Toronto is a French-language private school in Fairbank.

The Toronto District School Board operates public anglophone secular schools. The Toronto Catholic District School Board operates public anglophone Catholic schools. The Conseil scolaire Viamonde operates public secular Francophone schools serving the area. The Conseil scolaire de district catholique Centre-Sud operates public Catholic Francophone schools serving the area. Schools in the area include:

- Fairbank Memorial Community School
- FH Miller Junior Public School
- Fairbank Public School, a TDSB school
- St. John Bosco Catholic School
- D'Arcy McGee Catholic School
- St. Thomas Aquinas Catholic School
- DB Hood Community School had been converted to the Lycée Français de Toronto, a private French school

== Transportation ==
Toronto Transit Commission (TTC) bus routes that serve this neighbourhood include the 18 Caledonia, 29 Dufferin, 47 Lansdowne, 109 Ranee, and 929 Dufferin Express during regular hours, and for night service, 329 Dufferin and 334 Eglinton West. Currently, the nearest subway stations on Line 1 Yonge-University are Glencairn and Cedarvale stations, and the nearest Line 5 Eglinton stations are Caledonia, Fairbank and Oakwood stations.

== See also ==
- List of neighbourhoods in Toronto
