= Fairbank station =

Toronto subway station

Fairbank
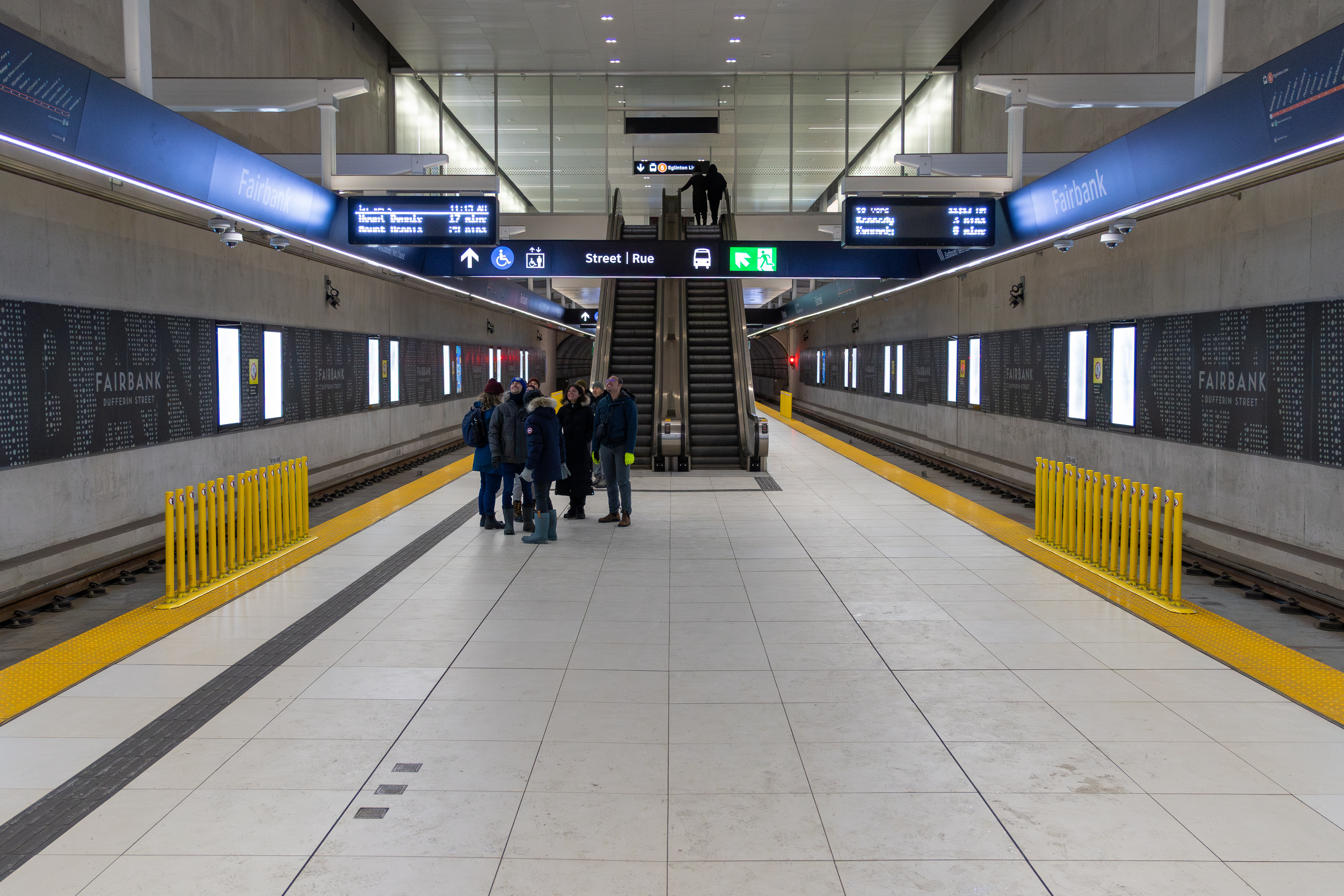
- Fairbank station platform

General information
- Location: 1815 Eglinton Avenue West, Toronto, Ontario; Canada
- Coordinates: 43°41′44″N 79°27′00″W
- Owner: Metrolinx
- Platforms: Centre platform
- Tracks: 2
- Connections: TTC buses: 29 Dufferin; 34 Eglinton; 329 Dufferin; 334 Eglinton; 929 Dufferin Express

Construction
- Structure type: Underground
- Accessible: Yes
- Architect: Daoust Lestage

History
- Opened: February 8, 2026; 9 months ago

Services
Preceding station	Toronto Transit Commission	Following station
Caledonia towards Mount Dennis	Line 5 Eglinton	Oakwood towards Kennedy
Location

Fairbank is an underground Toronto subway station on Line 5 Eglinton in Toronto, Ontario, Canada. It is located in the Fairbank neighbourhood at the intersection of Dufferin Street and Eglinton Avenue West. Destinations include Fairbank Memorial Park.

== Description ==
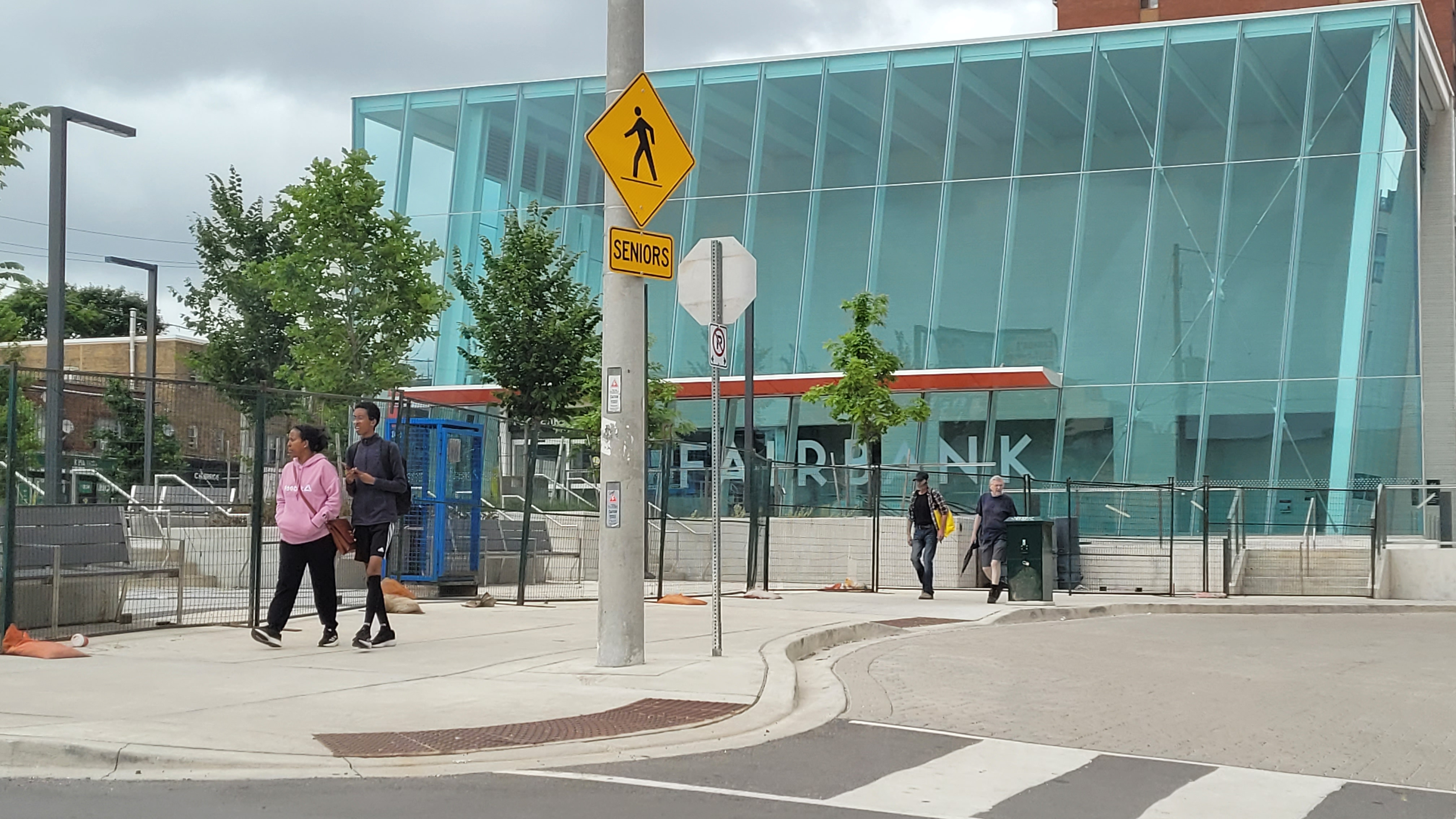
Main entrance prior to opening in June 2024

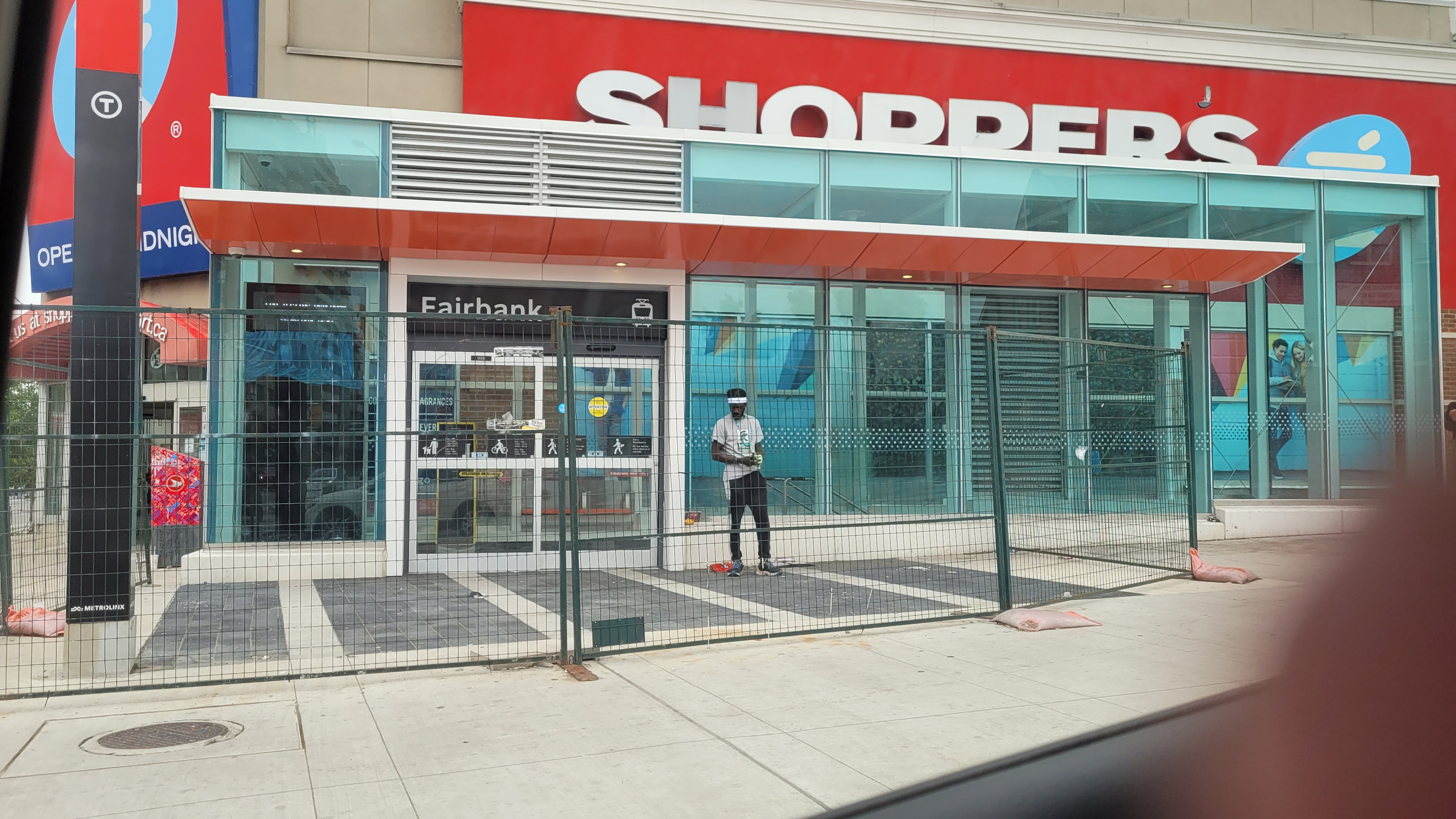
Secondary entrance prior to opening in June 2024

The main entrance replaces the Esso gas station on the east side of St. Hilda's Park, at the southeast corner of Dufferin Street and Eglinton Avenue. A secondary entrance is located on the northwest corner, where a right-turn slip road was removed to provide the necessary space. A third structure, for mechanical and venting purposes, replaces a storefront near the southwest corner. Fairbank station includes a decorative exterior plaza having grass, a misting feature, 14 shade trees, 15 benches and ten bicycle parking spaces. Retail space is located beside the main entrance. It will be suitable for community events.

=== Architecture ===
The station was designed by Daoust Lestage, following an architectural concept designed by architects gh3* from Toronto and Daoust Lestage Lizotte Stecker from Montreal. As with other stations on Line 5, architectural features include natural light from large windows and skylights, steel structures painted white, and orange accents (the colour of the line).

=== Station naming ===
During the planning stages for Line 5 Eglinton, the station was given the working name Dufferin, which was identical to the existing Dufferin station on Line 2 Bloor–Danforth. In 2015, a report to the TTC Board recommended giving a unique name to each station in the subway system (including Line 5 Eglinton). Thus, the LRT station was renamed Fairbank after the Fairbank neighbourhood rather than the intersecting Dufferin Street.

== Surface connections ==
The following bus routes serve Fairbank station:

Route	Name	Additional information
29A/C	Dufferin	Northbound to Wilson station
29A	Dufferin	Southbound to Exhibition Place (Dufferin Gate)
29C	Dufferin	Southbound to Exhibition Place (Princes' Gate)
34	Eglinton	Westbound to Mount Dennis station and eastbound to Kennedy station
929	Dufferin Express	Northbound to Wilson station and southbound to Exhibition Place (Dufferin Gate)
329	Dufferin	Blue Night service; northbound to Steeles Avenue West and southbound to Exhibition Place (Princes' Gate)
334A	Eglinton	Blue Night service; eastbound to Kennedy station and westbound to Renforth Drive and Pearson Airport
334B	Eglinton	Blue Night service; eastbound to Finch Avenue East and Neilson Road via Morningside Avenue and westbound to Mount Dennis station
