= Oakwood station =

Oakwood can refer to rapid transit stations on two different systems:

- Oakwood tube station, a London Underground subway station
- Oakwood station (Toronto), a Toronto subway station in Toronto, Canada
