= Jamaican diaspora =

Ethnic group

- The national flag of Jamaica

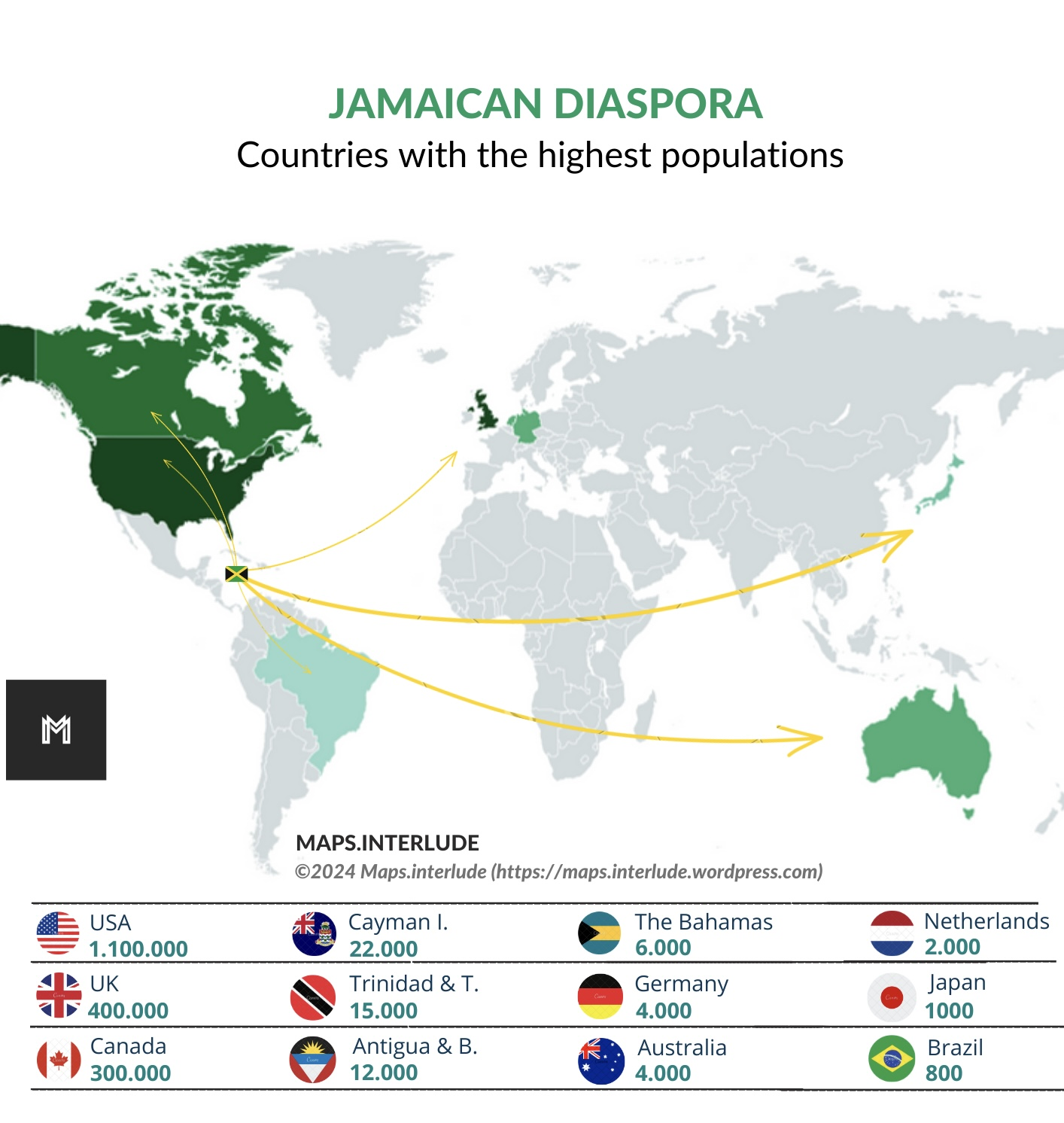

Total population
- ~2,000,000 (~1,300,000 Jamaican-born)

Regions with significant populations
- United States: 1,100,000+
- United Kingdom: 400,000
- Canada: 309,000

The Jamaican diaspora refers to the body of Jamaicans who have left the country of Jamaica, their descendants, and to a lesser extent the subsequent developments of their culture. Jamaicans can be found in the far corners of the world, but the largest pools of Jamaicans, outside of Jamaica itself, exist in the United States, United Kingdom, Canada, the Cayman Islands and all across the Caribbean Coast of Central America, namely Panama, Cuba, Costa Rica, Nicaragua and Honduras.

== Reasons for emigration ==
Early instances of Jamaican emigration were motivated by employment opportunities abroad. During the economic transition from slavery to wage labor, Indian-Jamaican migration to former slave industries (like sugar production) allowed select Black Jamaicans to find work in more skilled industries and to attain higher social statuses. Jamaicans of various skill levels supplied labor internationally, especially during the two phases of the Panama Canal's construction in the 1880s and 1910s. Job opportunities aimed at Jamaicans in Britain starting with post-war reconstruction in the 1940s, and unemployment during the 1950s, both of which continued following the country's independence in 1962, and slow economic growth at home also influenced increased Jamaican emigration. Ample immigration opportunities in Canada, the US and Britain also helped, providing Jamaicans with a thriving community of their kinsmen to join.

== Emigration patterns ==
In the late 20th and early 21st century close to a million Jamaicans have emigrated, especially to the United States, the United Kingdom, and Canada. Though this emigration appears to have been tapering off somewhat in recent years, the great number of Jamaicans living abroad has become known as the "Jamaican diaspora". Most Jamaican emigrants have followed a path first to the UK. Many who do not remain in the UK move on to other Commonwealth countries such as Canada. Jamaican emigrants also migrate directly to the United States, Canada, other Caribbean nations, Central & South America mainly in Panama and Colombia. There has also been emigration of Jamaicans to Cuba and to Nicaragua.

=== United Kingdom ===
The United Kingdom, and in particular London and Birmingham, have a strong Jamaican diaspora. An estimated 4% of Londoners and 3.5% of Brummies are of wholly or partly Jamaican heritage. Many are now at least second, if not third or fourth-generation Black British Caribbeans. Currently the fastest growing ethnic minority group in Britain is the mixed race category, with the mixed black & white Caribbean category (many of whom are half Jamaicans) being the single largest mixed ethnic minority.

Jamaicans first started migrating to Britain in the 1950s. After World War 2, Great Britain experienced a massive labor shortage. To solve this problem they invited people from the West Indies, mostly Jamaicans, to migrate to Britain. This lasted from 1948 to 1971. These people are known as the Windrush Generation, named after the first ship that carried passengers from Jamaica to the UK, Empire Windrush.

One of the largest and most famous Jamaican expatriate communities is in Brixton, South London. More large Jamaican communities in London are Tottenham in North London, Hackney in East London, Harlesden in North-West London and both Croydon & Lewisham in South London. The highest concentration of Jamaicans are more precisely in the South London boroughs of Lambeth, Lewisham & Croydon.

On the last bank holiday of the year during late August the Annual Notting Hill Carnival takes place in west London which is the second biggest street party in the world after Rio Carnival. It spans areas of north-west London such as North Kensington, Ladbroke Grove, Kensal Green and of course Notting Hill. Many other Caribbean nations have large communities in this part of London such as Trinidad and Tobago, Barbados and Antigua. The Caribbean community including many Jamaicans are involved in the Carnival which starts on Saturday and finishes late on Monday. Jamaicans have many food stalls, soundsystems and floats involved in the procession. Well over a million Londoners come to Notting Hill on the Monday. There is also a much smaller carnival called the Tottenham Carnival which takes place in Tottenham during June, approximately 40,000 people attend. Other Jamaican communities include the areas of St Pauls in Bristol, Chapeltown in Leeds, Moss Side, Longsight and Hulme in Manchester, Toxteth in Liverpool, Burngreave in Sheffield, Handsworth, Ladywood, Lozells, and Aston in Birmingham, and St Ann's, Top Valley, and Basford in Nottingham.

=== United States ===
Throughout the 1920s, Jamaican-U.S. migration was circular, with Jamaicans returning to home after working abroad. Immigration restrictions from the Immigration and Nationality Act of 1952 possibly influenced increases in Jamaican migrants over-staying contract limits. Jamaican-U.S. emigration increased dramatically during the 1960s, primarily of skilled Jamaican nurses. Possible factors behind this increase include high U.S. labor demand for nurses and medical workers during the 1960s, a shift in emigrant destinations after restrictions from the British Commonwealth Immigrants Act 1962, and the American Immigration and Nationality Act of 1965 favoring higher skilled Jamaicans and other West Indians.

Concentrations of expatriate Jamaicans are large in a number of cities in the United States, including New York City, Buffalo, Miami, Atlanta, Orlando, Tampa, Baltimore, Washington, D.C., Philadelphia, Hartford, Providence, Boston, Houston and Los Angeles. Westchester County and nearby Stamford also have significant Jamaican ex-pat communities.

New York City is home to a large Jamaican diaspora community. The Brooklyn communities are centred along Flatbush, Nostrand and Utica Avenues in the neighborhoods of Prospect Heights, Fort Greene, Clinton Hill, Park Slope, Bensonhurst, Lefferts Gardens, Flatbush, East Flatbush, Crown Heights, Kensington, Midwood, Bushwick, Bedford–Stuyvesant, Brownsville, East New York, Canarsie and Flatlands. Flatbush, Nostrand and Utica Avenues feature miles of Jamaican cuisine, food markets and other businesses, nightlife and residential enclaves. Jamaican communities in Bronx neighborhoods are Wakefield, Eastchester, Baychester. The borough of Queens also has a Jamaican diaspora presence.

In New York City a large percentage of the Jamaican High School & College graduates are associated with their High School Alumni organizations which are unified into the Union of Jamaican Alumni Associations (USA) Inc http://ujaausa.org/.

=== Canada ===
In Toronto, the Jamaican community is also large, with a metropolitan population of approximately 200,330 (3.4%). Jamaican populated areas of the city are located in the neighbourhoods of Rexdale in Etobicoke; Jane and Finch, Downsview and Lawrence Heights in North York; Malvern and West Hill in Scarborough; Regent Park, Alexandra Park, and Parkdale in Old Toronto; and Weston, Mount Dennis, Silverthorn and Oakwood–Vaughan in York, which also includes a Little Jamaica district that is identifiable along Eglinton Avenue West. In recent years, many Jamaicans have been moving out to suburbs such as Mississauga, Brampton and Ajax. The Jamaican community has had an influence on Toronto's culture. Caribana (the celebration of Caribbean culture) is an annual event in the city. The parade is held downtown on the first Saturday of August, shutting down a portion of Lake Shore Boulevard. Jamaica Day is in July, and the Jesus in the City parade attracts many Jamaican Christians. Reggae and dancehall are popular among Toronto's youth, of various ethnic backgrounds.

Outside the Greater Toronto Area, cities such as Montreal, Ottawa and Hamilton also have sizable Jamaican communities.

=== Other locations ===
More recently many resort- and wild-life-management-skilled Jamaicans have been trending emigration toward such far-flung nations as Australia, New Zealand (especially in Wellington and, to a lesser extent, Auckland), Mexico, Guatemala, El Salvador, Peru, Ecuador, Chile, Argentina, Venezuela, Liberia, Taiwan, Japan, Malaysia and Indonesia.

Jamaica continues to have a severe problem with barrel children - those left with family members (primarily grand parents) or selected guardians, by parents seeking a better life abroad. The term "barrel children" refers to the common practice of shipping goods, gifts and necessities in shipping barrels to these children (and family members). Once the parents become financially or legally stable, the children usually join the parents abroad.

== Statistics ==
=== United Kingdom ===
Around 800,000 Britons are of Jamaican origin. Located especially in London, Birmingham, Luton, Nottingham, Liverpool, Manchester, Leeds, Sheffield and Slough and Bristol.

=== United States ===
Around 1,171,915 people of Jamaican origin live in the United States, mostly concentrated in New York City (416,000), Pennsylvania, New Jersey, Connecticut, Rhode Island, Massachusetts, Delaware, Maryland, Virginia, North Carolina, Georgia and Florida.

Legal immigrants from Jamaica to the United States, 1986-2010
1986–1990	113,245
1991–1995	90,731
1996–2000	82,682
2001–2005	76,280
2006–2010	104,436
Total	467,374

=== Canada ===
Around 309,000, especially in the Toronto metropolitan area (around 200,000), other parts of Southern Ontario, Quebec and Alberta.
