= Palisadoes Foundation =

Non-profit organization

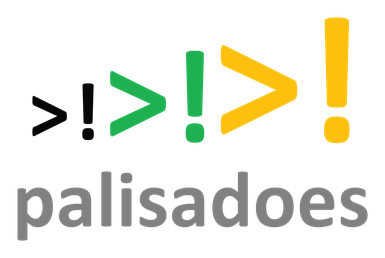
- Palisadoes Foundation logo
- Formation: 2016
- Type: Non-governmental organization, Non-profit organization, 501(c)(3) organization
- Purpose: STEM Education
- Location: Cupertino, California
- Region served: Caribbean
- Methods: Outreach
- Website: www.palisadoes.org

The Palisadoes Foundation is a non-profit organization based in Cupertino, California, US, founded in 2016 by members of the Jamaican diaspora and The Jamaica Diaspora Technology Taskforce to promote the use of information technology in Jamaica.

== Activities ==
The Palisadoes Foundation participates in a number of activities in accordance with its mandate to support STEM education in Jamaica.

=== The Calico Challenge ===
In 2016 the Palisadoes Foundation began the Calico Challenge, a program where software engineering students in Jamaican universities are awarded an internship to work on open-source software projects over the summer under the guidance of an industry mentor. Students are paid a stipend based on the achievement of predefined goals. Sponsors have included the JPS Foundation.

The Palisadoes Foundation also works closely with the Jamaica Computer Society in promoting and managing the Calico Challenge in Jamaica.

=== Open Source Repository ===
The Palisadoes Foundation's GitHub repository stores the open source software that is created and modified by its volunteers and student interns.

=== Equipment Donations ===
In 2018, the Palisadoes Foundation donated computer server equipment to the University of the West Indies, Mona, Jamaica and the University of Technology, Jamaica.
