= Orbitor station =

Bus rapid transit station in Mississauga, Ontario, Canada

Orbitor
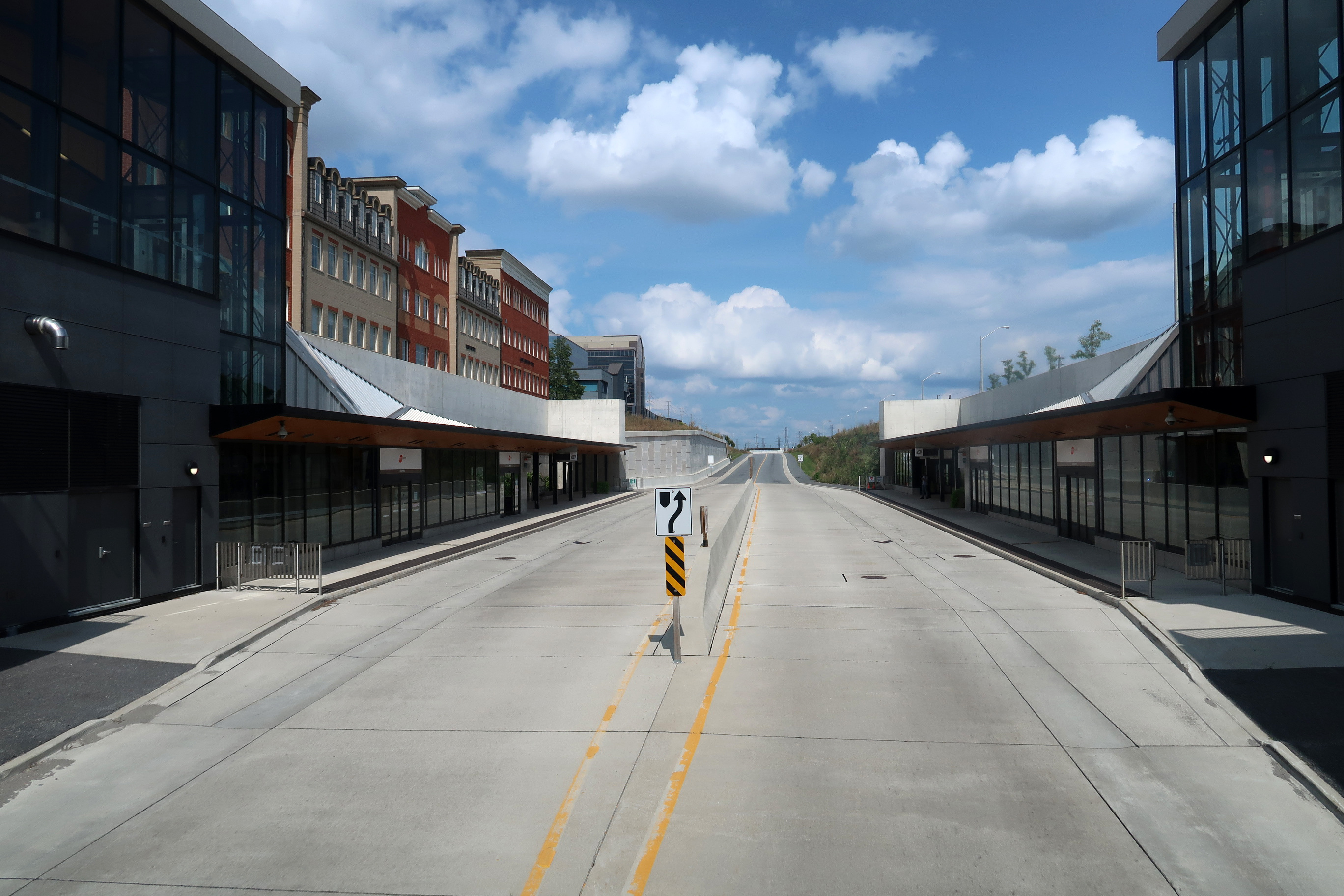

General information
- Location: 5015 Orbitor Drive; Mississauga, Ontario; Canada
- Coordinates: 43°39′23″N 79°35′54″W
- Owner: City of Mississauga
- Operator: MiWay
- Platforms: 2
- Connections: MiWay buses: 35 Eglinton; 107 Malton Express; 109 Meadowvale Express; 135 Eglinton Express

Construction
- Accessible: yes

History
- Opened: 1 May 2017

Services
Preceding station	Metrolinx	Following station
Spectrum toward Winston Churchill	Mississauga Transitway	Renforth Terminus
Location

Orbitor is a bus rapid transit station on the Mississauga Transitway in Mississauga, Ontario, Canada. It is located along the north side of Eglinton Avenue at Orbitor Drive.

Spectrum and Orbitor opened on 1 May 2017.
