= Oakwood Village =

- Neighbourhood
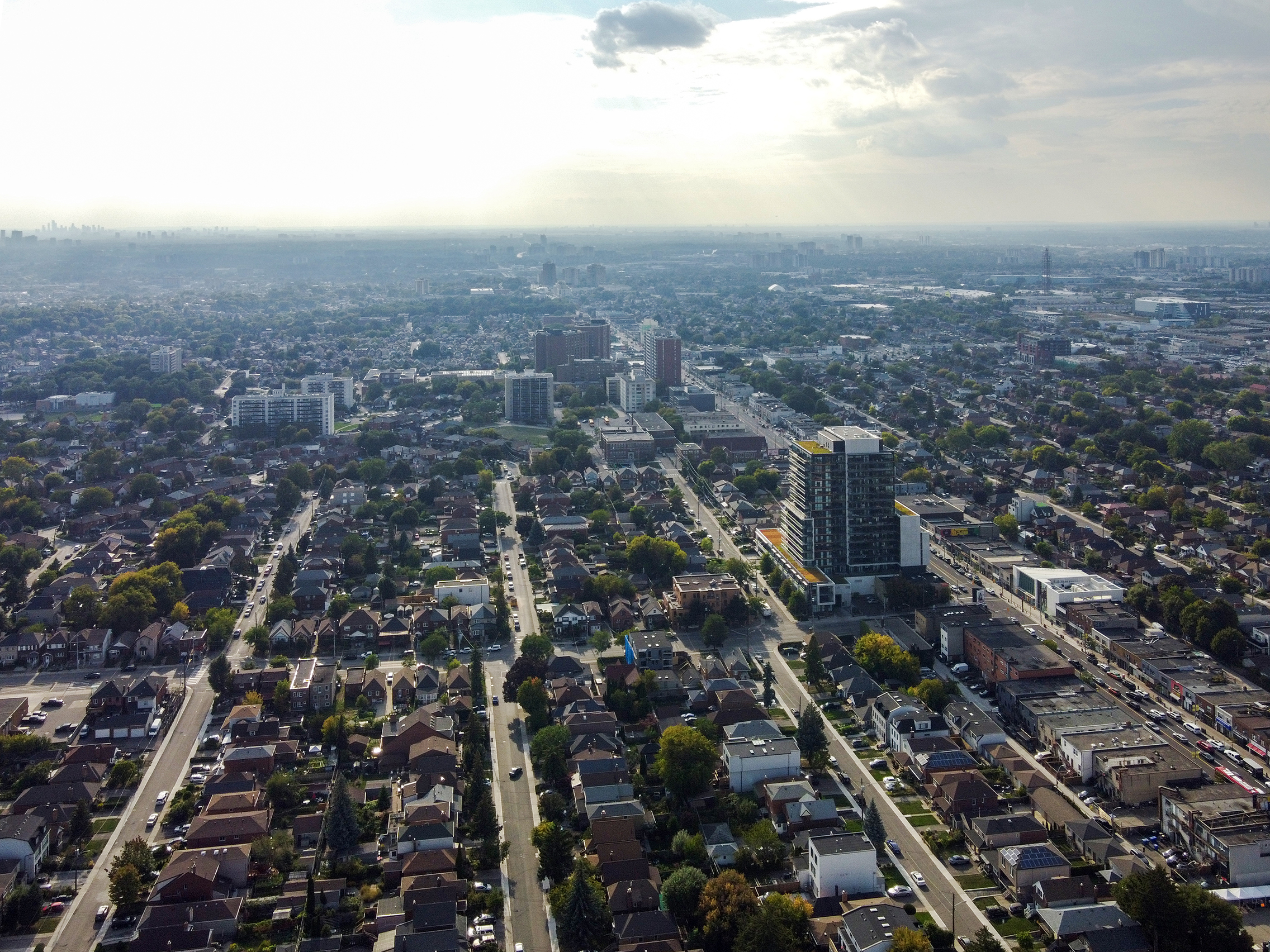
- Aerial view of Oakwood-Vaughan near Eglinton Avenue West in 2025

- Location within Toronto
- Coordinates: 43°41′33″N 79°26′27″W
- Country: Canada
- Province: Ontario
- City: Toronto
- Established: 1850 (York Township)
- Changed municipality: 1998 Toronto from York

Government
  - MP: Julie Dzerowicz (Davenport)
  - MPP: Marit Stiles (Davenport)
  - Councillor: Josh Matlow (Ward 12 Toronto—St. Paul’s)

Population (2016)
  - Total: 21,210
  - Density: 9,511/km^{2} (24,630/sq mi)

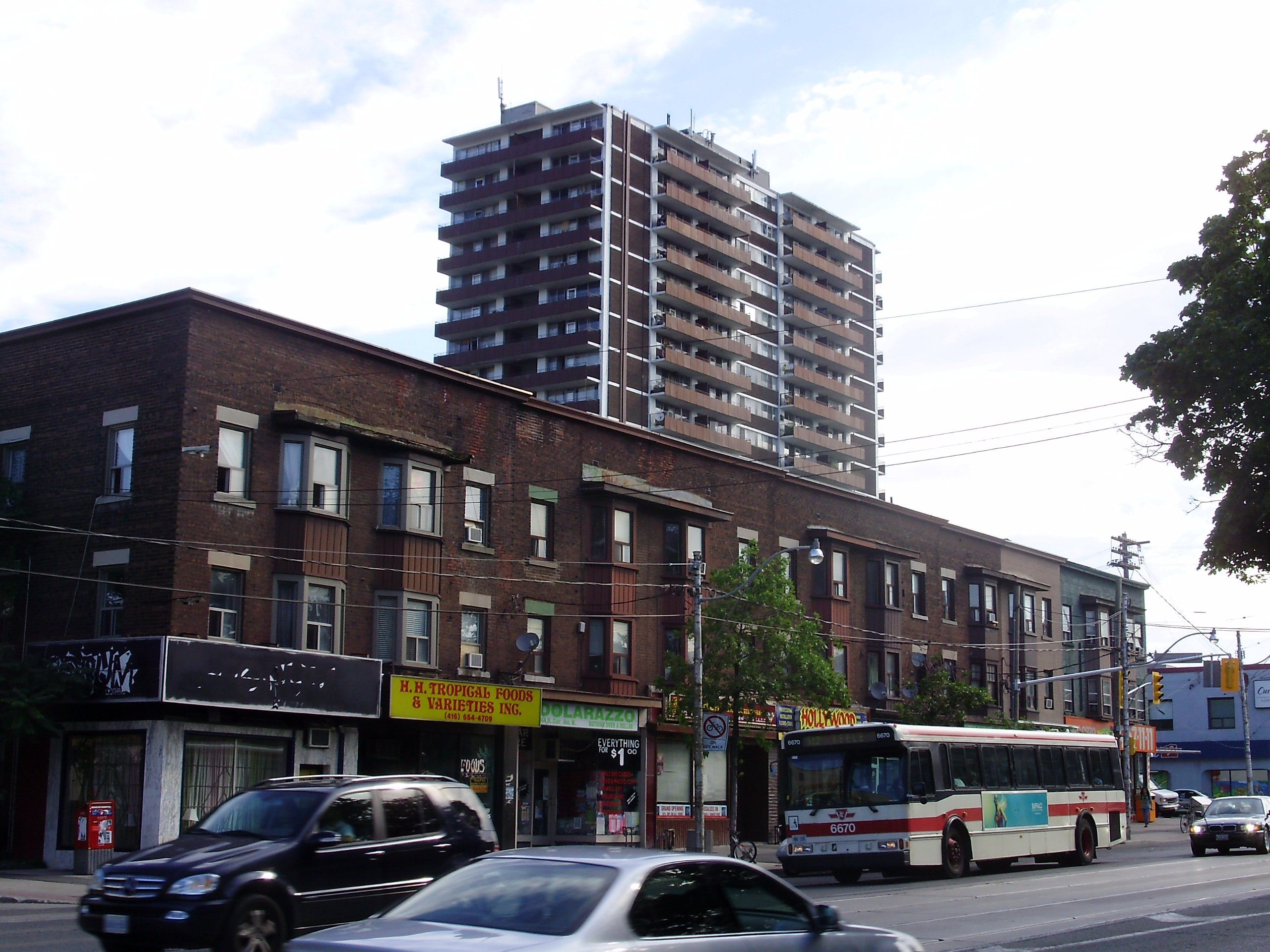
View of Oakwood-Vaughan from Oakwood and St. Clair Avenue

Oakwood Village, formerly known as Oakwood–Vaughan, is a neighbourhood in Toronto, Ontario, Canada. Located in the former inner suburb of York, the neighbourhood is a Business Improvement Area (BIA); it has an annual arts festival and a public library built in 1997.

The neighbourhood, commonly known as OV, is bordered by Eglinton Avenue West to the north (Briar Hill–Belgravia), Dufferin Street to the west (Caledonia–Fairbank), St. Clair Avenue West to the south (Corso Italia and Bracondale Hill), and Winona Drive to the east (Humewood–Cedarvale). Oakwood–Vaughan was part of the former City of York before the amalgamation of Toronto in 1998. The neighbourhood's northern half is nicknamed Five Points for the intersection of Oakwood Avenue, Vaughan Road, and Belvidere Avenue. The western half was called Northcliffe and is more recently known as Northcliffe Village.

== Character ==
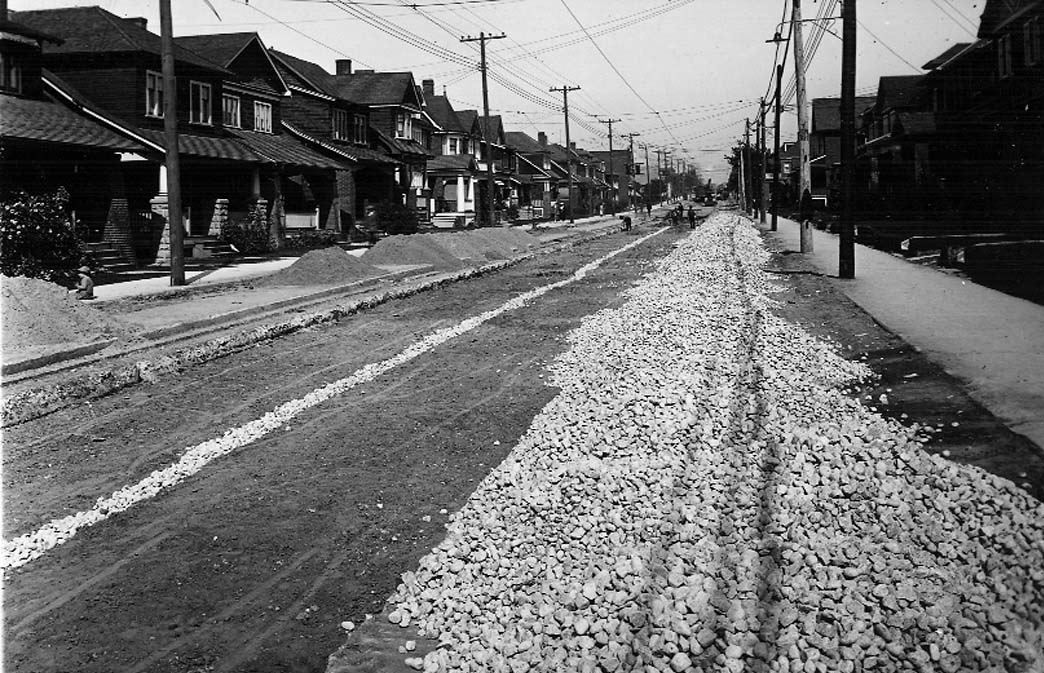
View of Oakwood–Vaughan from Oakwood Avenue, north of St. Clair Avenue, in 1924. The area was initially developed as a streetcar suburb.

Oakwood developed as a streetcar suburb of Toronto. Stephen Rogers constructed one of the first houses (on a 2.0-hectare (5-acre) plot) in this neighbourhood at what is now Rogers Road and Oakwood Avenue. The main streets of Oakwood–Vaughan are Oakwood Avenue, Vaughan Road, Rogers Road (named after Stephen Rogers), Dufferin Street, Eglinton Avenue West and St. Clair Avenue West. These main streets (aside from Vaughan Road) generally demarcate borders with other York and old City of Toronto neighbourhoods or borders of the sub-neighbourhoods and neighbourhoods (Five Points, Northcliffe Village) previously mentioned. A portion of Little Jamaica is located on the northern border of the neighbourhood, situated along the south side of Eglinton Avenue West between Oakwood Avenue and Marlee Avenue.

North of Vaughan Road and east of Oakwood Avenue, this part of the neighbourhood has a set of one-way streets that acts as a maze for motorists.

=== Political boundaries ===
Oakwood–Vaughan's municipal status/boundaries has changed on several occasions. One of the most significant changes was the result of an amalgamation in 1998. Formerly part of the City of York, York became part of the larger City of Toronto, along with Etobicoke, Scarborough, and North York—all cities in their own right—and the Borough of East York on January 1, 1998.

Municipally, the area has a complex history and its boundaries have changed several times. Since the 1998 amalgamation, from Dufferin Street to Winona Drive and north of Rogers Road up to Eglinton Avenue (and beyond), it is a small part of Ward 15: Eglinton—Lawrence. The eastern part of the neighbourhood (east of Oakwood Avenue) also extends into Ward 21: St. Paul's. Residents west of Oakwood Avenue and south of Rogers Road reside in Ward 17: Davenport. A visual representation of the wards is provided for reference.

Provincially, the political boundaries have also changed, as recently as in the 2007 provincial election where it was designated part of the St. Paul's riding. Until 2009, MPP Michael Bryant represented the residents. Bryant stepped down in early 2009, and Eric Hoskins won a by-election, becoming the new MPP. Residents living east of Oakwood Ave. are part of the St. Paul's provincial riding. The official website, however, has an outdated map from 2005, and so lists the area, incorrectly, as part of the Davenport riding.

Federally, the area is also part of St. Paul's riding and is represented by MP Dr. Carolyn Bennett.

== Culture ==
There are several organizations in the Oakwood–Vaughan area that are working to effect positive change and are trying to counteract the negative, often stereotypical, media coverage of the area. The Oakwood Village BIA, founded in 2009, is actively trying to beautify the area and attract vibrant businesses.

Another organization is the Oakwood Village Community Association (formerly 5 Points Community Action) that was founded in 2005. 5 Points Community Action originally took its name from the "5 Point" intersection of Oakwood Ave., Vaughan Rd., and Belvidere Ave.

While there are several outstanding issues to be tackled, the group has coordinated and completed several community projects to strengthen connections between neighbours, politicians, police, and community agencies. A community garden, located at the corner of Belvidere and Oakwood Avenues, was completed with funding from Clean & Beautiful City.

Another project, a striking mosaic, is located on the south side of Belvidere Avenue, on the community garden's retaining wall. This was completed in partnership with Art Starts. The mosaic illustrates the motif of 'roots' and has “welcome” in many different languages, including Polish, Hebrew, Italian and Portuguese, among others.

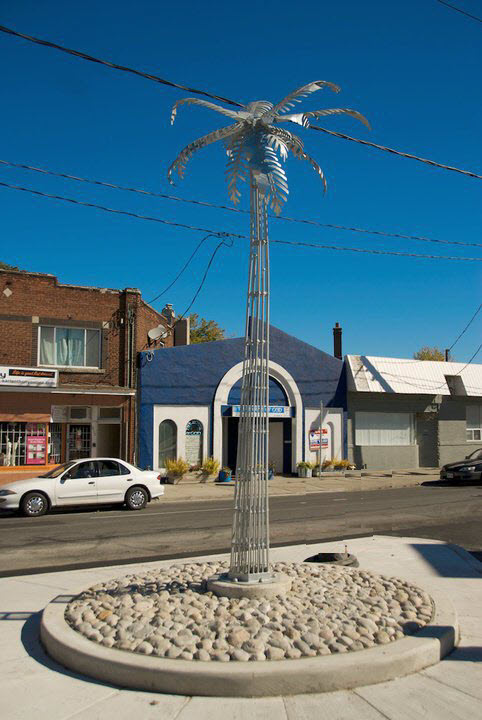
The Oakwood Village Transit Island features a 4.88-metre (16.0 ft) metal palm tree erected in October 2010.

A more recent project was an art installation that was completed in partnership with Clean & Beautiful City and the City of Toronto. The newly reconstructed Oakwood Village Transit Island, located directly at the corner of Oakwood and Vaughan, was completed in October 2010. Standing tall in this oasis is a 4.88 metres (16.0 ft) steel palm tree that represents the strong roots put down by the residents of Oakwood Village. The palm tree, which can be found throughout the world's warmer nations, is a symbol of unity—the coming together of the many diverse groups in the Oakwood–Vaughan community. However, the tree generated local controversy, as a political hopeful stated that it cost the city $350,000 to erect. The actual cost of the tree was $4,200.

=== Festivals ===
The Oakwood Village Arts Festival, held annually in June, is brings the community together around arts by providing a public platform for local artists and musicians. As a curated festival revolving around the theme of village, this event features theatre, dance, music, creative writing, art exhibits, interdisciplinary works and public discussions.

The area is also home to the Arlington Village Project, along the western border with Humewood-Cedarvale, which works to create more positive community building and connecting events in the area. Starting in 2010, the project has organized outdoor fairs.

=== Landmarks ===
Built in 1936, the former Mount Zion Apostolic Church of Canada is one of the hundreds of apostolic churches in Toronto. It was relocated to North York.

== Demographics ==
Estimates of ethnic origin by world region in Oakwood Village:

- 61% European
- 18% Southeast & East Asian
- 13% Other North American
- 10% Caribbean
- 8% Central, South & Latin American
- 7% African
- 4% South Asian
- 3% West Central Asian & Middle Eastern
- 1% North American Indigenous
- <1% Oceania

The above estimates are based on the 2016 Canadian census; respondents to the census can identify with more than one ethnic origin, so the above figures can sum to more than 100%.

Estimates of Household Mean Income:

- One-person households: $38,036
- Two-or-more person households: $78,464

== Education ==
The public school districts serving the community are Toronto District School Board (secular anglophone), Toronto Catholic District School Board (Catholic anglophone), Conseil scolaire Viamonde (secular francophone), and Conseil scolaire de district catholique Centre-Sud (Catholic francophone).

High schools

- Oakwood Collegiate Institute, at the southwest corner of Oakwood Avenue and St. Clair Avenue. The school is technically located in the Regal Heights neighbourhood enclave of Corso Italia/Davenport, south of Oakwood–Vaughan, but serves students from both neighbourhoods.

Former high schools

- Vaughan Road Academy, at Vaughan Road between Alameda Avenue and Winona Drive, closed in 2017. It offered the IB Diploma Programme when it was open.

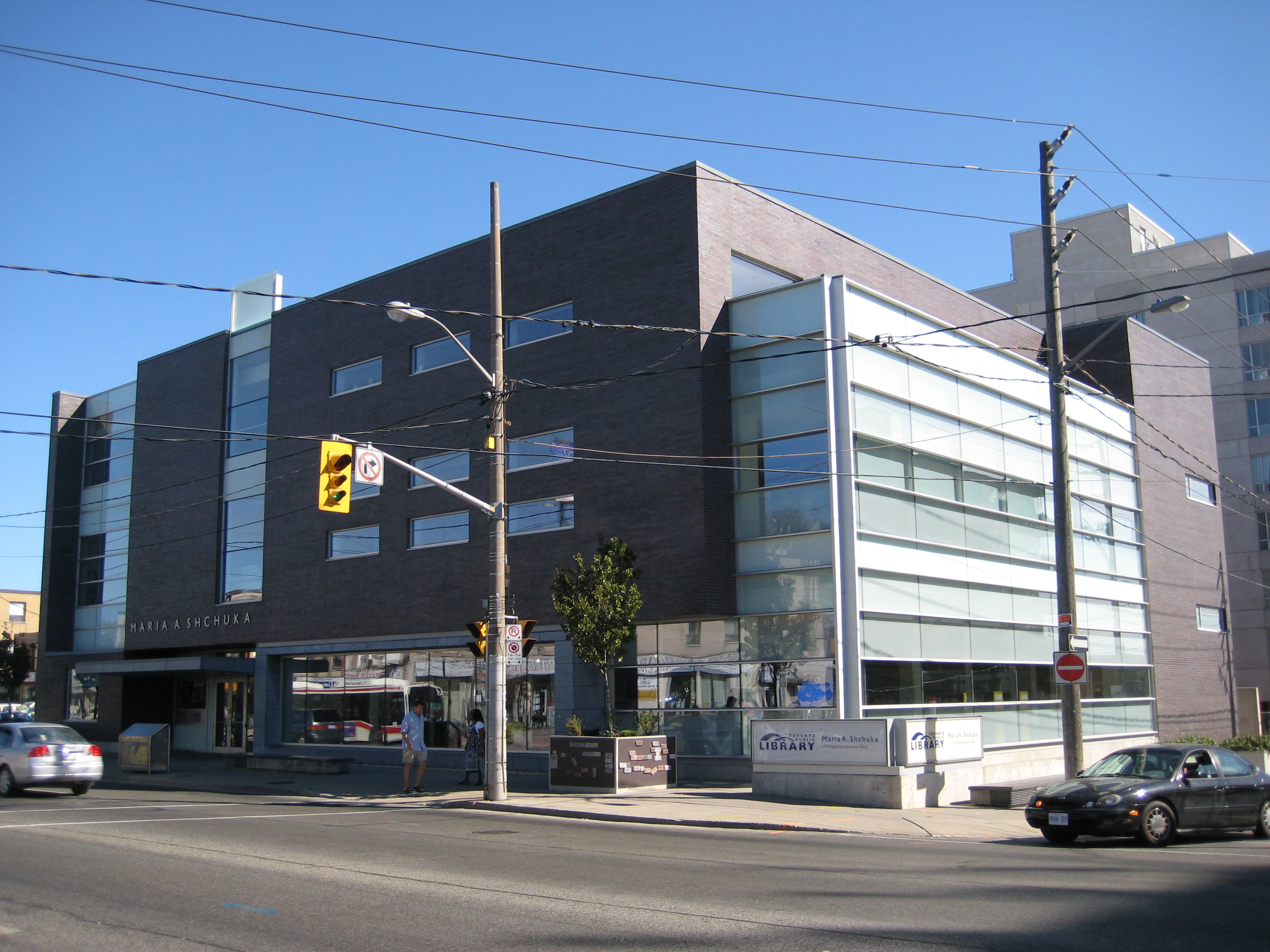
The Maria A. Shchuka Library is one of two branches of the Toronto Public Library located in Oakwood–Vaughan.

Roman Catholic elementary schools

- St. Thomas Aquinas, D'Arcy McGee, and St. Alphonsus.

Secular public elementary schools

- Rawlinson Community School, on Glenholme Avenue south of Oakwood Village.
- J.R. Wilcox Community School, on Ava Road between Winona Drive and Atlas Avenue.
- Fairbank Public School, at the intersection of Eglinton Avenue West and Dufferin Street.

=== Public library ===
Built in 1997, Oakwood Village Public Library is located on Oakwood Avenue and Holland Park Avenue. In addition to Oakwood Village branch, the Maria A. Shchuka Public Library, which was re-rebuilt in 2003, is also located on the neighbourhood's periphery at Eglinton Avenue and Northcliffe Boulevard. Both of these libraries are run by the Toronto Public Library.

== Transportation ==
The neighbourhood is west of Cedarvale station, and has three 24-hour bus routes: the 29 (Dufferin Street), the 32 (Eglinton Avenue West), and the 63 (Oakwood Ave) which runs between Eglinton West station and Liberty Village. There are other buses that operate very frequently, including the 161, which runs along the southern stretch of Oakwood Avenue and along Rogers Road, and the 90, which runs along Vaughan Road to St. Clair West station. The 512 St. Clair streetcar route runs east–west along St. Clair, just below the southern border of Oakwood–Vaughan. The bus routes and the 512 St. Clair streetcar route are operated by the TTC.

The Rogers Road streetcar line formerly ran along Rogers Road before being replaced by a trolley bus route, in turn later replaced by the route 161 Rogers Road bus.

== Notable residents ==
- Kardinal Offishall, hip hop musician
- Zalika Reid-Benta, writer
- Watts, hip hop producer

== Nearby Neighbourhoods ==
- Humewood-Cedarvale
