= Little Jamaica =

Coordinates: 43.69454°N 79.4553°W

- Neighbourhood of Toronto
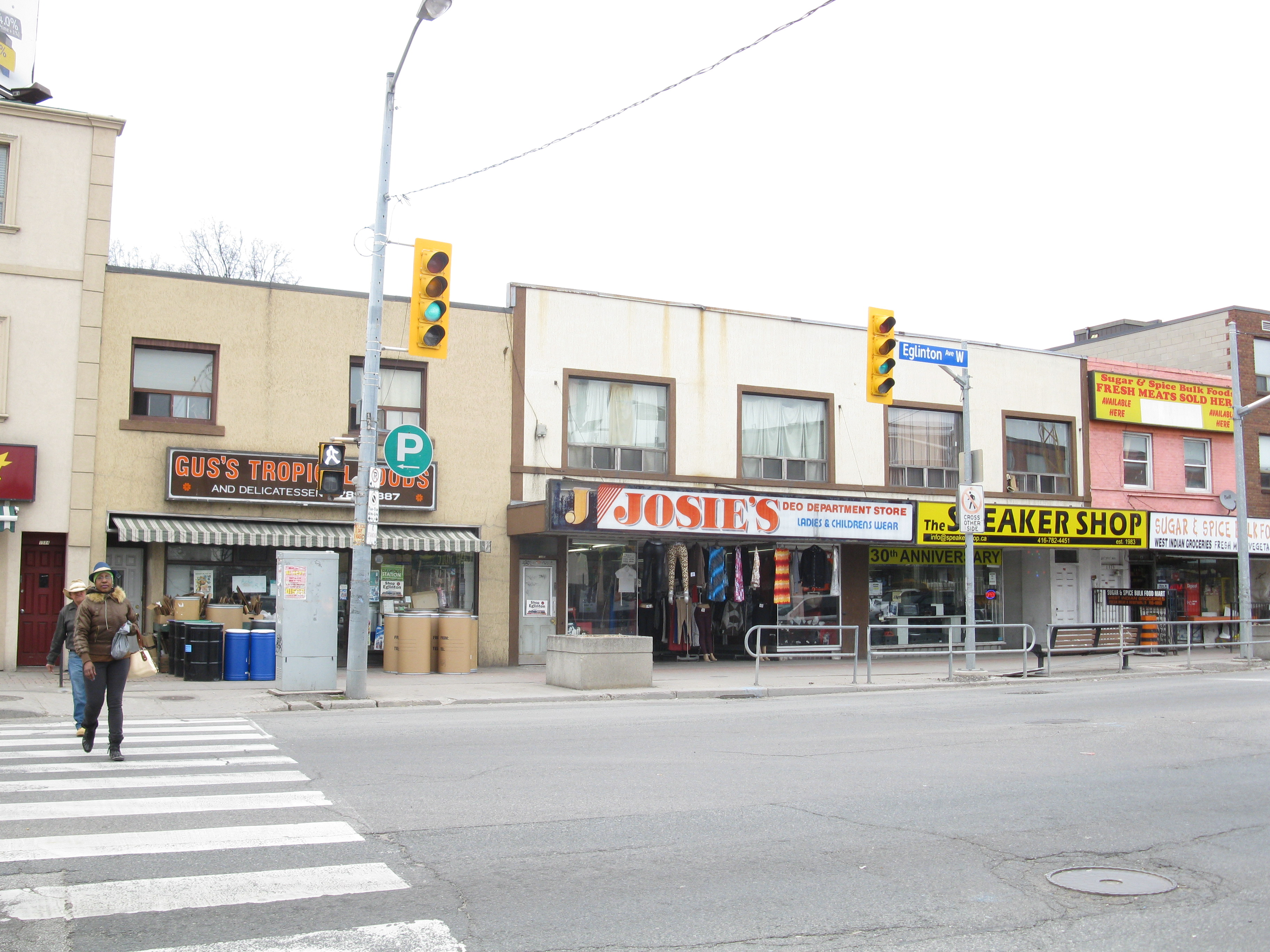
- Shops at Eglinton Avenue West and Oakwood Avenue, before demolition to construct Oakwood station

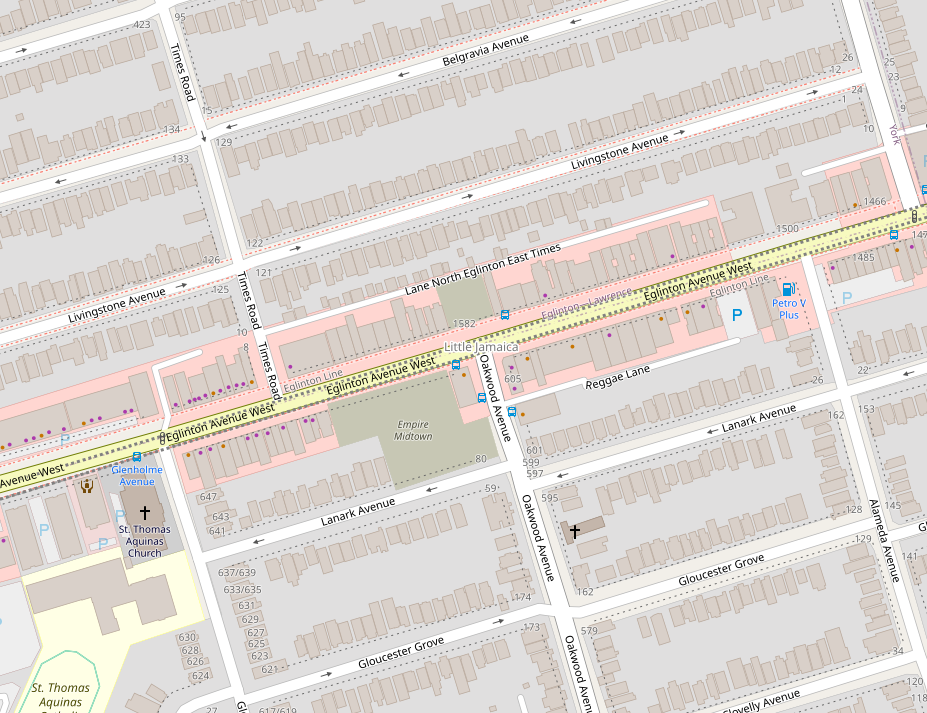
- Location in Toronto
- Country: Canada
- Province: Ontario
- City: Toronto
- Established: 1850 (York Township)
- Changed municipality: 1998 Toronto from York

Little Jamaica, also known as Eglinton West, is an ethnic enclave in Toronto, Ontario, Canada. It is located along Eglinton Avenue West, from Marlee Avenue to Keele Street, and is part of four neighbourhoods: Silverthorn, Briar Hill–Belgravia, Caledonia–Fairbank, and Oakwood–Vaughan. The commercial main street has been recognized to be of great cultural heritage significance to the city of Toronto, as a distinct ethnic and cultural hub for Afro-Caribbean immigrants for many decades.

== Demographics ==
Little Jamaica has historically been an immigrant hub. Jamaican and Caribbean immigrants began settling in the area in the late 1950s in response to the West Indian Domestic Scheme. Between the 1970s and 1980s, as the number of Jamaicans migrating to Toronto increased to around 100,000, many settled in the Eglinton West area. This has made Little Jamaica one of the largest expatriate Jamaican communities in the world.

However, the changing demographics of Little Jamaica have been noted by both locals and media. Reports show that between 2006 and 2016, the Black population along Eglinton West has declined 13 per cent, compared to an overall population decrease of five per cent. The area increasingly consists of different immigrant groups including people of Chinese, Italian, Portuguese, Hungarian, and Filipino descent. By 2021, gentrification and redevelopment had been affecting demographics.

== Economy ==
There are many Jamaican businesses along this strip. There are also businesses of other Caribbean/West Indian communities, including Trinidadian, Bajan, Grenadian and Guyanese among others. The businesses along Eglinton Avenue West are frequented by many in the Greater Toronto Area's 177,000-plus Jamaican community. The area overlaps the York–Eglinton Business Improvement Area, which stretches from Marlee Avenue in the east to Chamberlain Avenue in the west (just west of Dufferin Street).

The laneway behind storefronts on the south side of Eglinton was officially named "Reggae Lane" in 2014, in honour of its heritage as a hot spot for reggae in the 1970s and 1980s.

== Effects of Line 5 Eglinton construction ==
Amid the construction of Line 5 Eglinton, a.k.a. the Eglinton Crosstown LRT, Little Jamaica saw decreased traffic to the area. While it was anticipated that upon completion the line would result in more visitors to the area, many residents and businesses had been affected by the construction. Reports suggest 40 to 45 per cent of businesses from Marlee Avenue to Dufferin Street had closed down or relocated since construction began on the transit project. Delays extended the opening of the crosstown until early 2026.

In addition to the LRT construction, the COVID-19 pandemic had also been a factor hurting business in the area.

== Heritage status ==
In April 2021, Toronto City Council voted unanimously to designate Little Jamaica as a "heritage conservation district understudy". This allows the city's planning department to study and survey the area in order to preserve it under the Ontario Heritage Act. This would offer some protection from future development in the area from accelerating gentrification and displacing existing businesses and residents that give the area its character.

== In popular culture ==
- The 2001 play Da Kink in My Hair and its 2007–09 television sitcom adaptation are set in the neighbourhood.
- Jamaican reggae group Black Uhuru released a song about the neighbourhood called “Youth of Eglington” on their 1981 album Red.
- Elle Canada's September 2019 issue was shot in Little Jamaica, with cover stars Winnie Harlow and Stephan James.
- Zalika Reid-Benta's award-winning novel, Frying Plantain is set in Little Jamaica.
- The award-winning documentary, Tallawah Abroad: Remembering Little Jamaica, from writer-director Sharine Taylor, chronicles the history of Little Jamaica.
