= Reggae Lane =

Road in Toronto, Canada

Reggae Lane is a roadway in Toronto, Ontario, Canada, that runs east from Oakwood Avenue, behind a strip of buildings on the south side of Eglinton Avenue in the Little Jamaica ethnic enclave. For most of its history it had no official name, but the imminent arrival of Oakwood LRT station helped trigger its 2015 official naming.

The neighbourhood near Reggae Lane was recognized as a centre for reggae recording as early as the late 1960s.

Toronto Transit Commission chair Josh Colle, the councillor for that part of the city, played a prominent role in the lane's renaming, and in the allocation of funds for clean-up and redevelopment. He asserted that the neighbourhood around the Laneway is the largest centre for the recording of reggae music, outside of Jamaica.

On September 19, 2015, Colle introduced a 1,200-square-foot (110 m^{2}) mural of Bob Marley, Haile Selassie, and the Lion of Judah, by Adrian Hayles. The Jamaica Gleaner described it as an instance of a foreign country showing respect for the genre of reggae music. Jay Douglas, and other reggae artists, performed a concert to celebrate the completion of the mural. Douglas had composed a new song, named Reggae Lane, which he performed at the concert.

On July 21, 2015, the City of Toronto government announced that Reggae Lane would be one of the first four local songs that would be played for callers to 311, while they waited for help. The song describes the history and ambience of the neighbourhood, in reggae style.

With encouragement from The Laneway Project, the City of Toronto intends to name all its unnamed laneways. Reggae Lane has been cited as a successful example of the value of this renaming program.
