= Oakwood station (Toronto) =

Toronto subway station

Oakwood
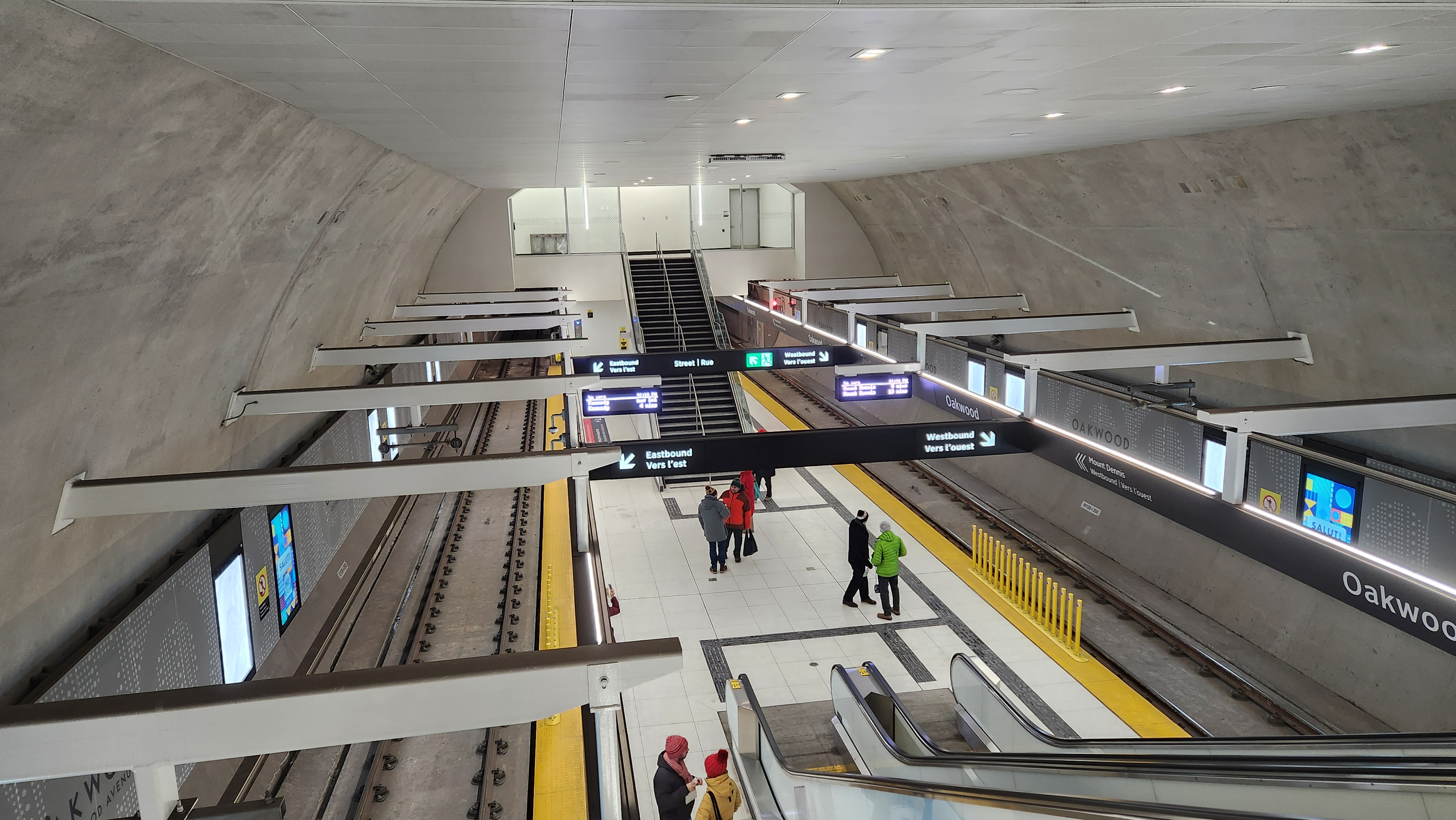
- Oakwood station platform

General information
- Location: 1580 Eglinton Avenue West; Toronto, Ontario; Canada
- Coordinates: 43°41′50″N 79°26′35″W
- Owner: Metrolinx
- Platforms: Centre platform
- Tracks: 2
- Connections: TTC buses: 34 Eglinton; 63 Ossington; 90 Vaughan; 334 Eglinton; 363 Ossington

Construction
- Structure type: Underground
- Accessible: Yes
- Architect: Arcadis

History
- Opened: February 8, 2026; 9 months ago

Services
Preceding station	Toronto Transit Commission	Following station
Fairbank towards Mount Dennis	Line 5 Eglinton	Cedarvale towards Kennedy
Location

Oakwood is an underground Toronto subway station on Line 5 Eglinton in Toronto, Ontario, Canada. It is located in the Little Jamaica neighbourhood at the intersection of Oakwood Avenue and Eglinton Avenue.

Local member of Provincial Parliament Mike Colle organized a petition in 2012 that led to a station at Oakwood Avenue being added to the Crosstown plan. The main destination will be the Eglinton West commercial strip.

== Description ==
Both entrances replace existing storefronts; the main entry will be located directly at the northern end of Oakwood Avenue, serving as that street's terminating vista, the only station along Line 5 to serve as such, while the secondary will be on the south side of Eglinton some 80 metres (260 ft) west between Oakwood Avenue and Times Road. The station will provide outdoor space to park 24 bicycles.

=== Architecture and artwork ===
The station was designed by Arcadis, following an architectural concept designed by architects gh3* from Toronto and Daoust Lestage Lizotte Stecker from Montreal. As with other stations on Line 5, architectural features includes natural light from large windows and skylights, steel structures painted white, and orange accents (the colour of the line). At platform level, the station features curved sides.

Oakwood station has an art installation by Nicolas Pye displayed on the main station entrance façade consisting of a photograph of colourful pick-up sticks on a white background. The work suggests the intersection of transit routes on a map as well as symbolizing cultural diversity in the neighbourhood.

In 2026, following a motion adopted by Toronto City Council, Metrolinx committed to delivering an additional public art installation at Oakwood station in collaboration with artist Adrian Hayes, intended to reflect the cultural identity of the Little Jamaica neighbourhood.

== Construction ==
The National Post reported that contractors who thought they were pumping grout into holes they had drilled had filled a sewer near Oakwood station with cement, shortly before Christmas 2013. The report quoted a local business leader who said, due to Metrolinx attitude, his section of the Avenue "almost feels like it's the wild, wild west." The report asserted the accident increased local displeasure with the construction period. Locals had initially been mystified when sewage had backed up into their basements.

In March 2015, the east–west laneway south of Eglinton, near the station, was named Reggae Lane. Alampi credited the building of the station as a trigger to redeveloping the lane. The lane had once been the heart of Toronto's recording of Reggae music.

In June 2015, Metrolinx plans to expropriate a barbershop near the station triggered comment. The owners told CBC News that Metrolinx had failed to contact them, prior to announcing the expropriation in a local paper.

An overhead crane was assembled on the pile wall at the site of the station's main entrance. According to Metrolinx, this is the first time in Canada an overhead crane has been used over an open excavation. The site had no space to install a more typical tower crane or a luffing crane. The crane stood 12 metres (39 ft) tall and, when combined with its beams, weighed 73 tonnes (80 tons).

The station was constructed using the sequential excavation method (SEM), referred to as "mining", which resulted in the station having a cylindrical shape. Oakwood, Avenue and Laird stations were all constructed by this method, while the other underground Line 5 stations were built by cut-and-cover. According to Crosslinx (part of the project's construction consortium), SEM is more common in Europe and the Crosstown is the first project to use the technique in Toronto.

== Surface connections ==
The following bus routes serve Oakwood station:

Route	Name	Additional information
34	Eglinton	Westbound to Mount Dennis station and eastbound to Kennedy station
63	Ossington	Northbound to Cedarvale station and southbound to Liberty Village via Ossington station
90	Vaughan	Northbound to Cedarvale station and southbound to St. Clair West station
334A	Eglinton	Blue Night service; eastbound to Kennedy station and westbound to Renforth Drive and Pearson Airport
334B	Eglinton	Blue Night service; eastbound to Finch Avenue East and Neilson Road via Morningside Avenue and westbound to Mount Dennis station
363	Ossington	Blue Night service; northbound to Cedarvale station and southbound to Exhibition Loop

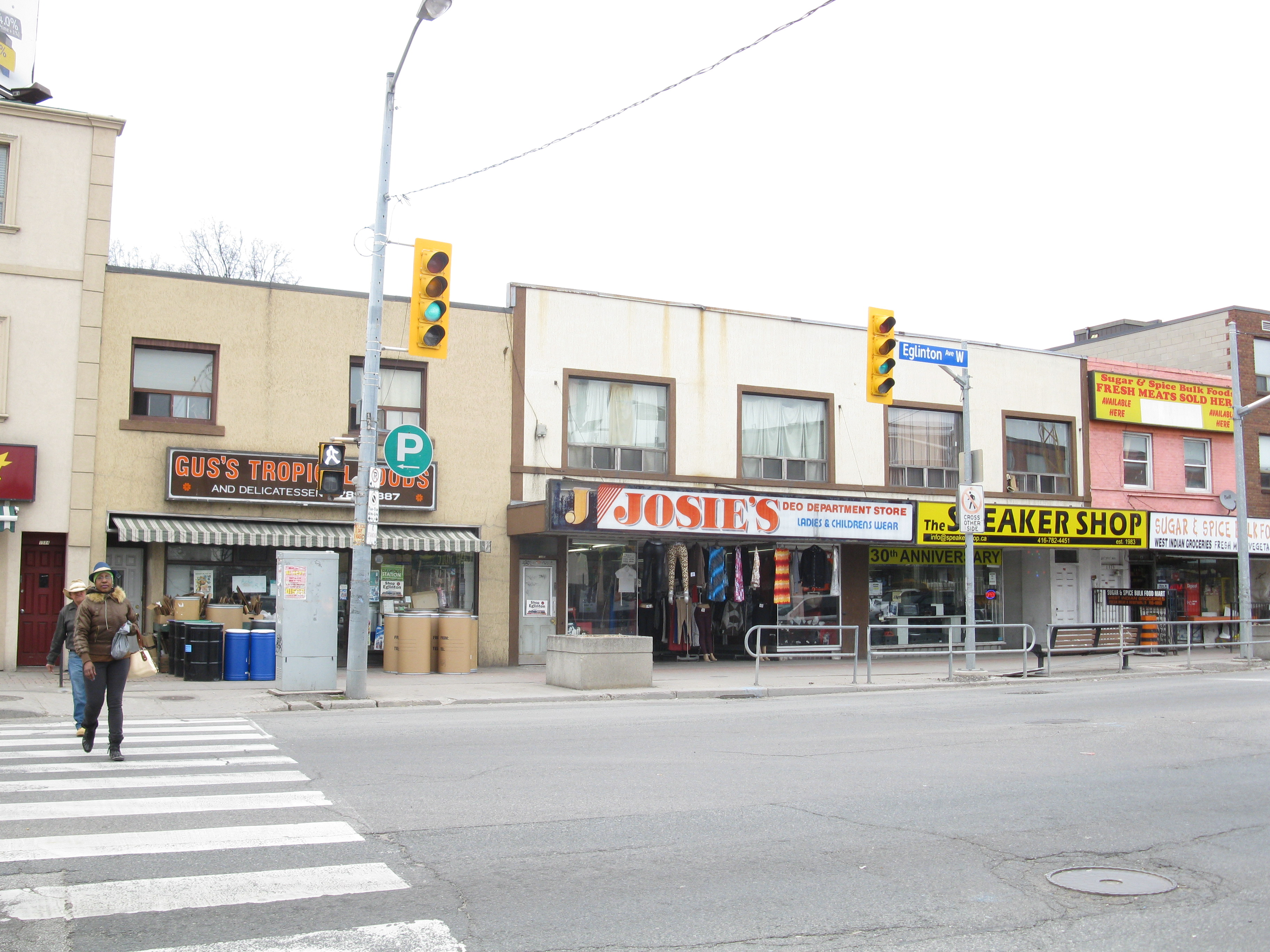
2013 photo of storefronts that existed before the construction of Oakwood station

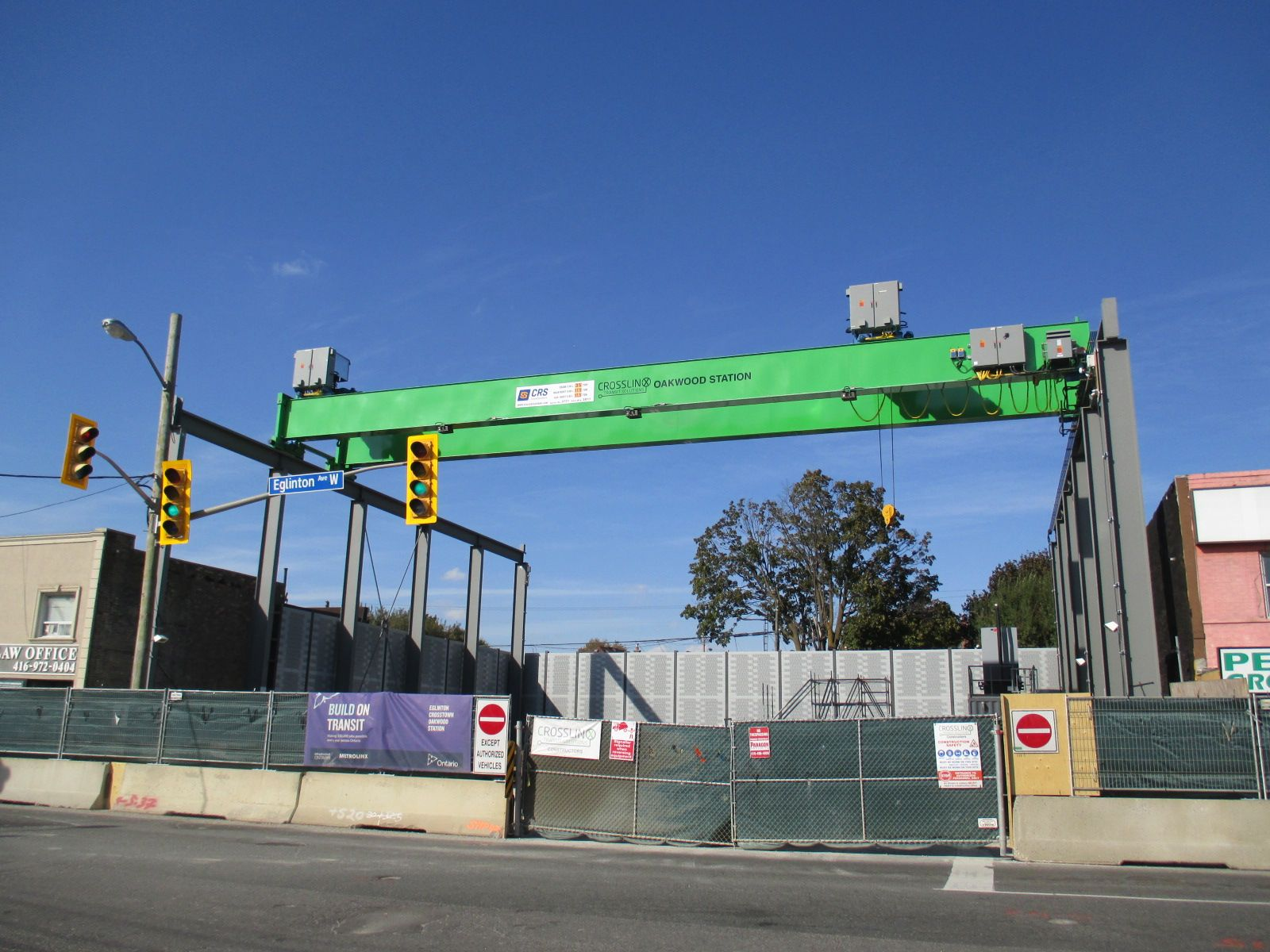
Construction crane at site of main station entrance in 2017

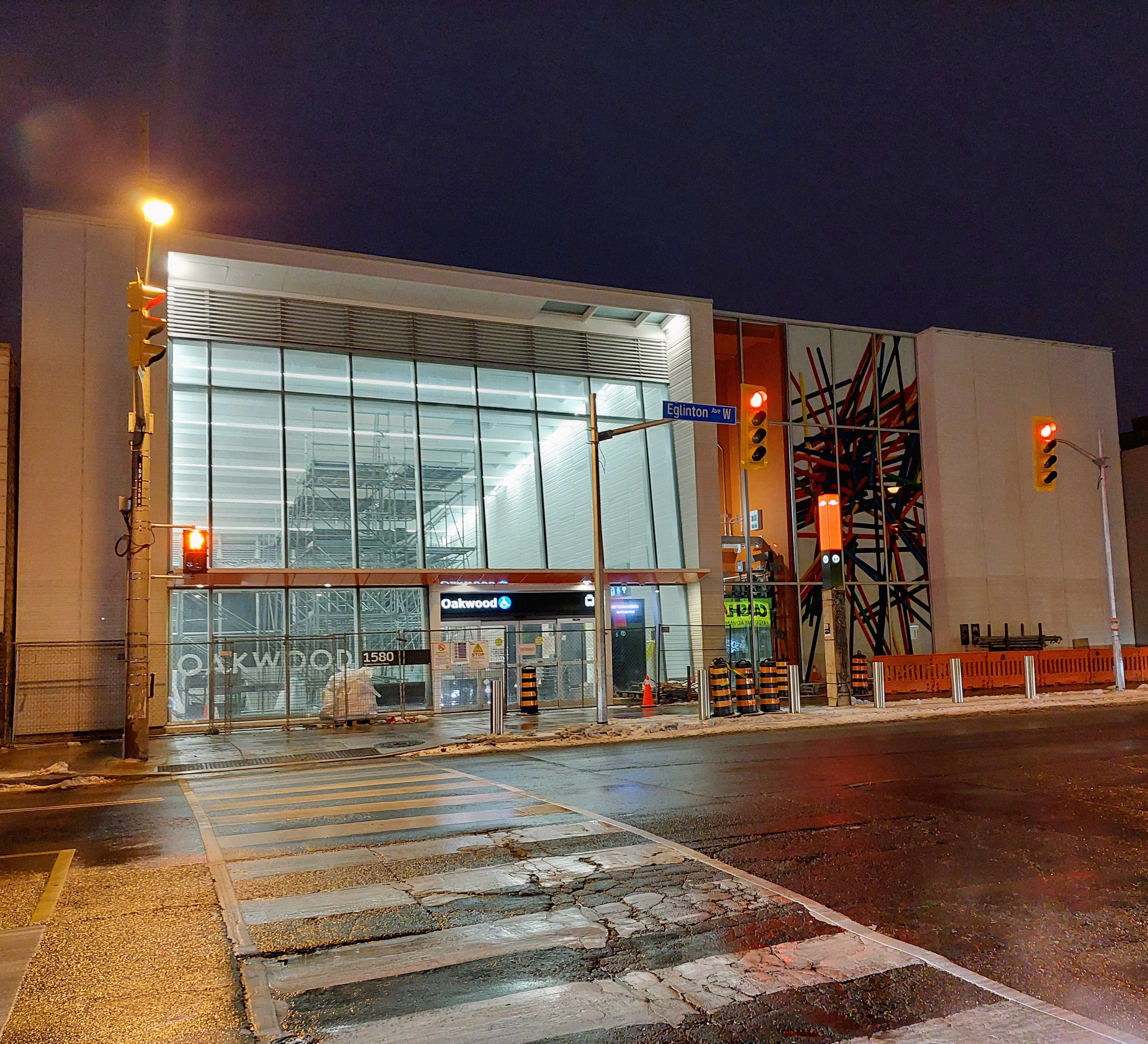
Main entrance under construction in January 2024
