= Fairbank Memorial Park =

Park in Toronto, Ontario, Canada

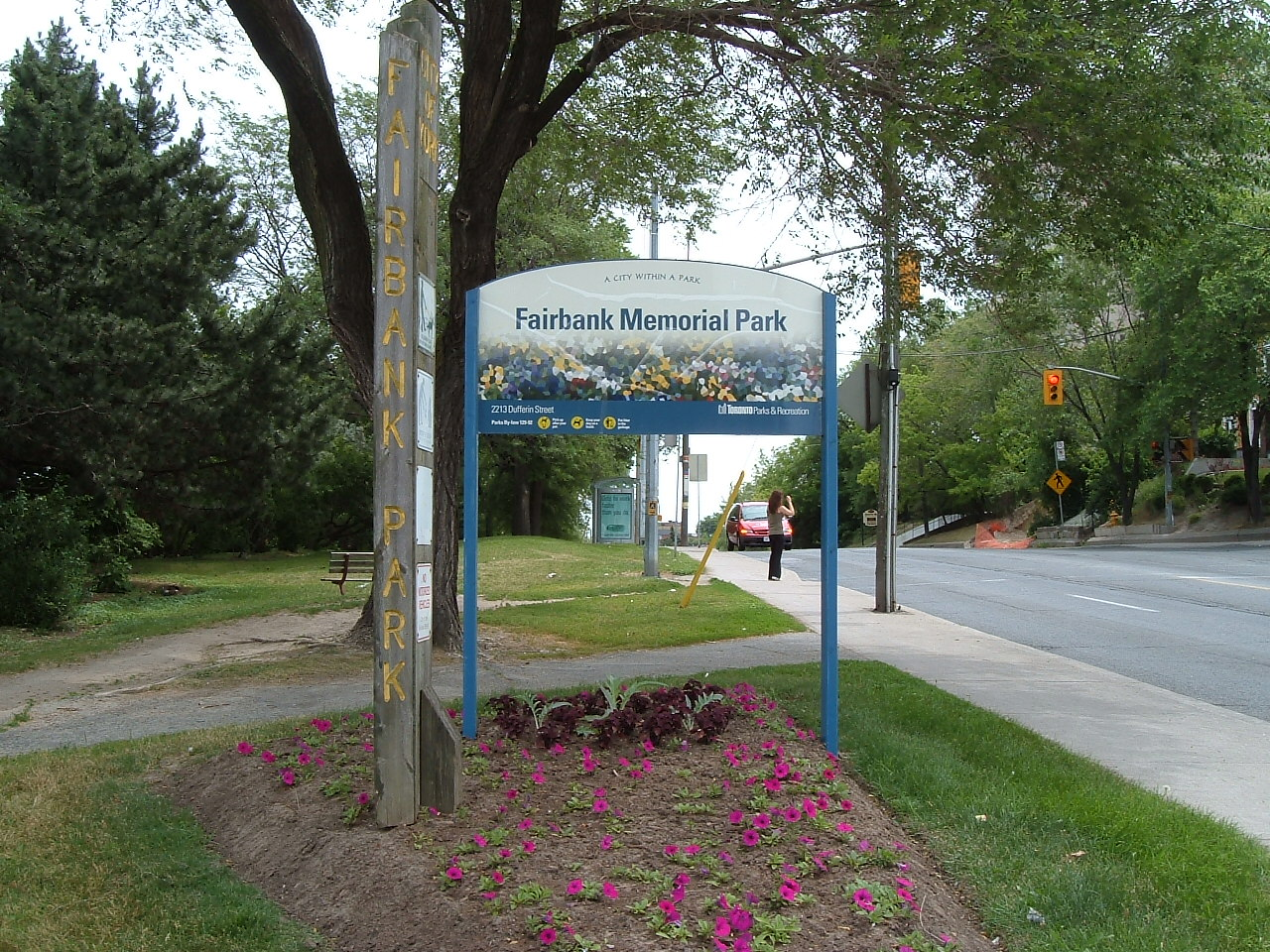
- Signage at the entrance to the park (left is the former City of York signage and right is the post-amalgamation City of Toronto signage)

- Location within Toronto
- Type: Public Park, Outdoor Pool
- Location: Toronto, Ontario
- Coordinates: 43°41′30″N 79°26′50″W
- Operator: City of Toronto
- Website: Fairbank Park

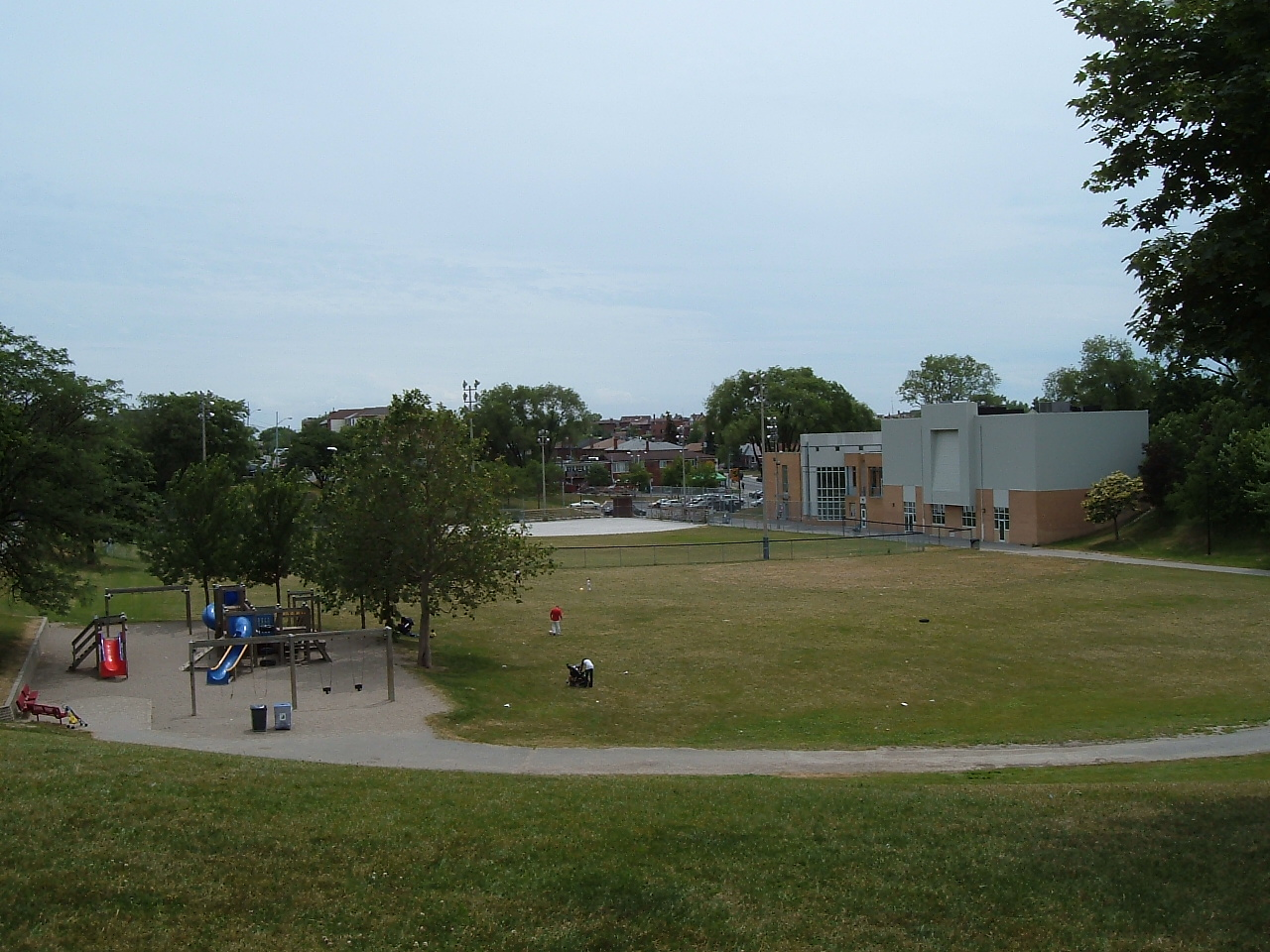
View of Fairbank Memorial Park, looking south.

Fairbank Memorial Park is a park located in the neighbourhood of Fairbank in Toronto, Ontario, Canada.

== Description ==
The park's official address is 2213 Dufferin Street. It is bordered on the west by Dufferin Street, on the north by Keywest Avenue, and on the south by Gibson Street. It consists of 9.1 acres (3.7 ha) of ground, which contains the Fairbank Memorial Community Recreation Centre. It is home to Fairbank Outdoor Pool, a swimming pool that is run by the City of Toronto Parks, Forestry and Recreation West Toronto York District Aquatics Department. The facility consists of a baby pool, a large pool, and an eating area. The pool fits a capacity of 250 patrons which including a maximum of 50 in the baby pool area. The park also has a playground, an open athletic field for sports like rugby or soccer, and athletic courts for baseball, basketball, and bocce.

The park is situated in a ravine with steep slopes, often used in winter by locals for sledding and tobogganing. However, with the current construction of the Fairbank-Silverthorn Storm Trunk Sewer System, the park is boarded up in areas that do not allow for this winter activity. The park still remains open to residents despite construction.

== Development scandal ==
In the late 1980s, Fairbank Park became embroiled in a major political scandal. Several politicians, including City of York deputy mayor Tony Mandarano, became involved in a secret deal with land developer Lou Charles. Mandarano received more than $100,000 in bribes, and York Council member Jim Fera received $341,000; in exchange, they agreed to speak in favour of Charles's development plans during council meetings, the most prominent of which involved tearing down Fairbank Park and selling the land to Charles so that he could construct condominiums on the site.

Councilwoman Frances Nunziata leaked material to the press illustrating irregularities in the process, leading to a police investigation of several local politicians. Six of the eight council members losing their seats in the 1991 election. Mandarano received a sentence of 15 months in prison in a plea bargain, while Fera accepted an 18-month sentence in a similar deal.

The decision to sell part of the park before redesignating the land for residential development was illegal, as it did not follow the City of York's Official Plan. In addition, the public input on the proposed project was limited and the public's support of the new condominiums was debatable.
