= Eglinton Avenue =

Road in Toronto and Mississauga, Canada

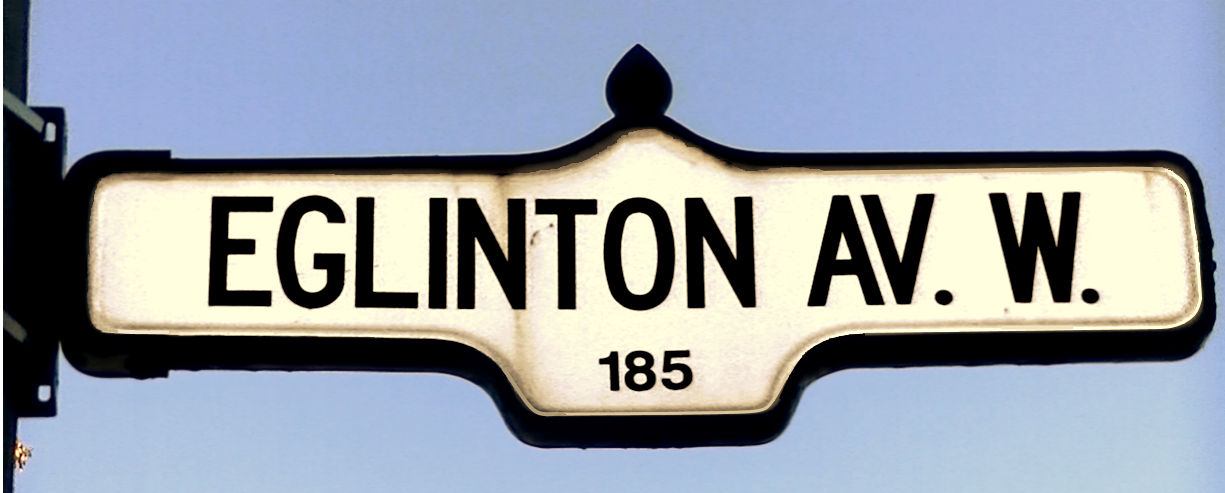
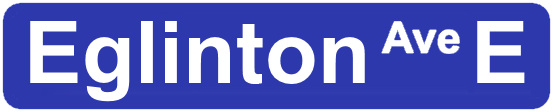

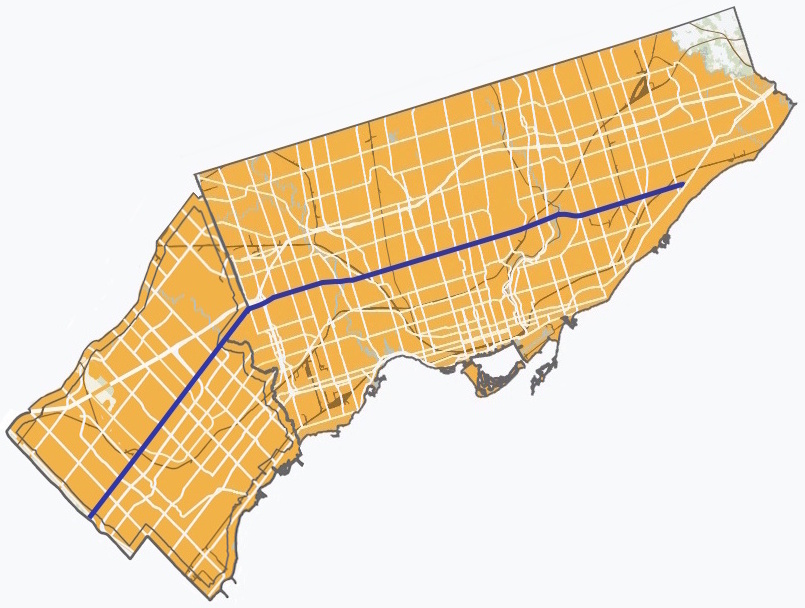
- Eglinton Avenue through Toronto and Mississauga (blue line)
- Maintained by: City of Toronto; City of Mississauga
- Length: 59.9 km (37.2 mi)
- Location: Toronto, Mississauga
- West end: 407 ETR (No interchange. continues as Lower Base Line)
- Major junctions: Ninth Line; Winston Churchill Boulevard; Erin Mills Parkway; Mavis Road; Hurontario Street; Highway 403; Dixie Road; Highway 401; Kipling Avenue; Islington Avenue; Jane Street; Black Creek Drive; Keele Street; Dufferin Street; Allen Road; Bathurst Street; Avenue Road; Yonge Street; Bayview Avenue; Leslie Street; Don Mills Road; Don Valley Parkway; Victoria Park Avenue; Warden Avenue; Kennedy Road; Markham Road
- East end: Kingston Road

Other
Nearby arterial roads
← Highway 403; Burnhamthorpe Road; St. Clair Avenue	Britannia Road; Lawrence Avenue →

Eglinton Avenue is a major east–west arterial thoroughfare in Toronto and Mississauga in Ontario, Canada. In the west, the street begins at Highway 407 (but does not interchange with the tollway) at the western limits of Mississauga, as a continuation of Lower Baseline in Milton and runs nearly 60 kilometres (37 miles) across the midsection of both cities before ending at Kingston Road. Within Toronto, Eglinton Avenue is the only street that crossed all six municipalities of the former Metropolitan Toronto prior to its amalgamation: Etobicoke, York, (Old) Toronto, East York, North York, and Scarborough. The section between the Etobicoke Creek and Renforth Drive forms part of the city limits of Toronto and Mississauga.

It was historically known as Richview Sideroad in Etobicoke and Lower Baseline in Mississauga. It was also briefly designated Highway 5A (and later Highway 109) in Scarborough.

== History ==
The Toronto section was surveyed in the 19th century as the Fourth Concession Road (with the first being Queen Street).

There are two sources for the naming of Eglinton Avenue. Henry Scadding in an early history of the city wrote that it originated from Eglinton Castle in Scotland, itself named for the Earls of Eglinton. Several early settlers, impressed by the Eglinton Tournament of 1839 hosted by the 13th Earl, named the hamlet developing in the area as the Village of Eglinton after the Earl. More likely is the humbler story that it was named by the tavern keeper John Montgomery who settled in the area in 1830 and named the village after the Earl of Eglinton of the Montgomerie family, to whom he believed he had a family connection, despite the slight difference in spelling.

The wagon trail connecting to Yonge Street between the third and fifth concessions (St. Clair and Lawrence Avenues respectively) soon adopted the name of the village and was gradually improved over the years near Yonge Street. In 1890, the area was incorporated as North Toronto, and in 1912, it was annexed to Toronto itself. In 1953, Metropolitan Toronto (commonly known as Metro) was formed. Seeking to build new connections to the rapidly developing suburbs, Metro widened and interconnected Eglinton Avenue to its current form through the decade.

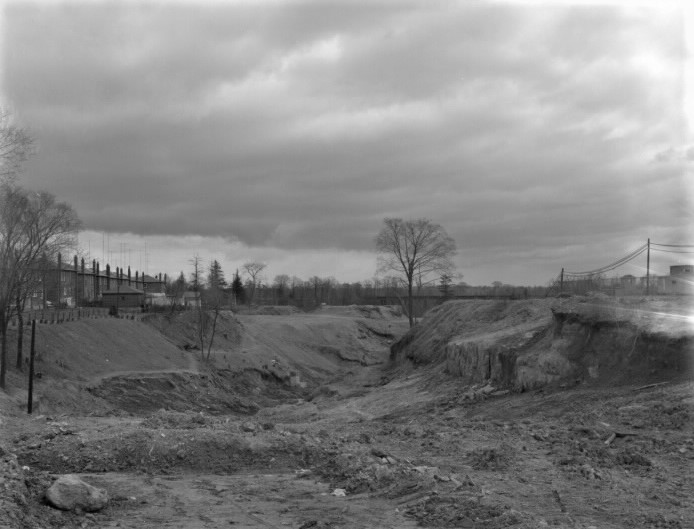
Construction of Eglinton across the Don Valley gap in 1956, as seen from east of Brentcliffe Road

The eastern segment through Scarborough was known as Highway 5A between 1937 and 1953; this number also appeared on St. Clair Avenue West until 1952 when the Toronto Bypass, (the precursor to Highway 401), opened between Weston and Highway 11 (Yonge Street). The two pieces of "Highway 5A" were never connected. In 1953, what remained was renumbered as Highway 109; a year later, the road was removed from the provincial highway system. Because of its time as a provincial highway, the road through Scarborough was widened considerably. A right of way was also acquired to bridge the gap in Eglinton Avenue. Until the mid-1950s, Eglinton Avenue did not cross either of the valleys of the Don River. The road ended at Brentcliffe Road (unassigned path beyond Laird Drive towards Brentcliffe Road and the dump was once site of hangar for Leaside Aerodrome) and resumed at Victoria Park Avenue (then known as Dawes Road). This break resulted in a bypassed eastern stub at Bermondsey Road signed as Old Eglinton Avenue. The Department of Highways relinquished control of Highway 109 to the newly formed Metro government. Metro built the new section of Eglinton Avenue, first between Dawes Road and Don Mills Road in 1955, and later between Don Mills Road and Leaside in 1956.

In the west, the street ended at the Humber River until 1970. On the opposite side in Etobicoke, the Richview Sideroad followed the same alignment as far as the Metro Toronto–Peel boundary. That year, the river was bridged to connect the Richview Sideroad segment as an extension of Eglinton Avenue. At about the same time, when the Highways 401 and 427 interchange was reconstructed, the street was connected to Lower Base Line, extending the street even further west into Mississauga. West of Mississauga, in the Regional Municipality of Halton, it is a rural road and is still named Lower Base Line (the corresponding Upper Base Line being present-day Steeles Avenue).

The structure over the Richmond Hill line and East Don River is known as the Harvey C. Rose Bridge, and honours the chief engineer of the Toronto and York Roads Commission, later the Metropolitan Toronto Commission of Roads.

=== Richview Expressway proposal ===
In 1943, city planner Norman Wilson indicated the possible future need for a new urban highway to connect Eglinton Avenue with the Richview Sideroad. These plans would mature into the Richview Expressway with the formation of Metropolitan Toronto in 1954. Part of the requirements for the Richview Expressway was a staged construction of a parallel arterial road. This was approved in 1963, and construction began on Eglinton Avenue from west of Weston Road to Royal York Road. With its completion in 1970, the four-lane Richview Sideroad was renamed Eglinton Avenue West.

In Toronto, the right-of-way to construct the Richview Expressway remains but in the face of Local opposition the project has never come to fruition. The only built part of the proposed Expressway are high-speed ramps from Eglinton Avenue to Highways 401 and 427 at a massive interchange near Renforth station. At a signalized intersection this results in westbound Eglinton traffic defaulting to the on-ramps for 401 and 427 as drivers wishing to continue on the Eglinton routing have to make a left-turn.

== Route description ==
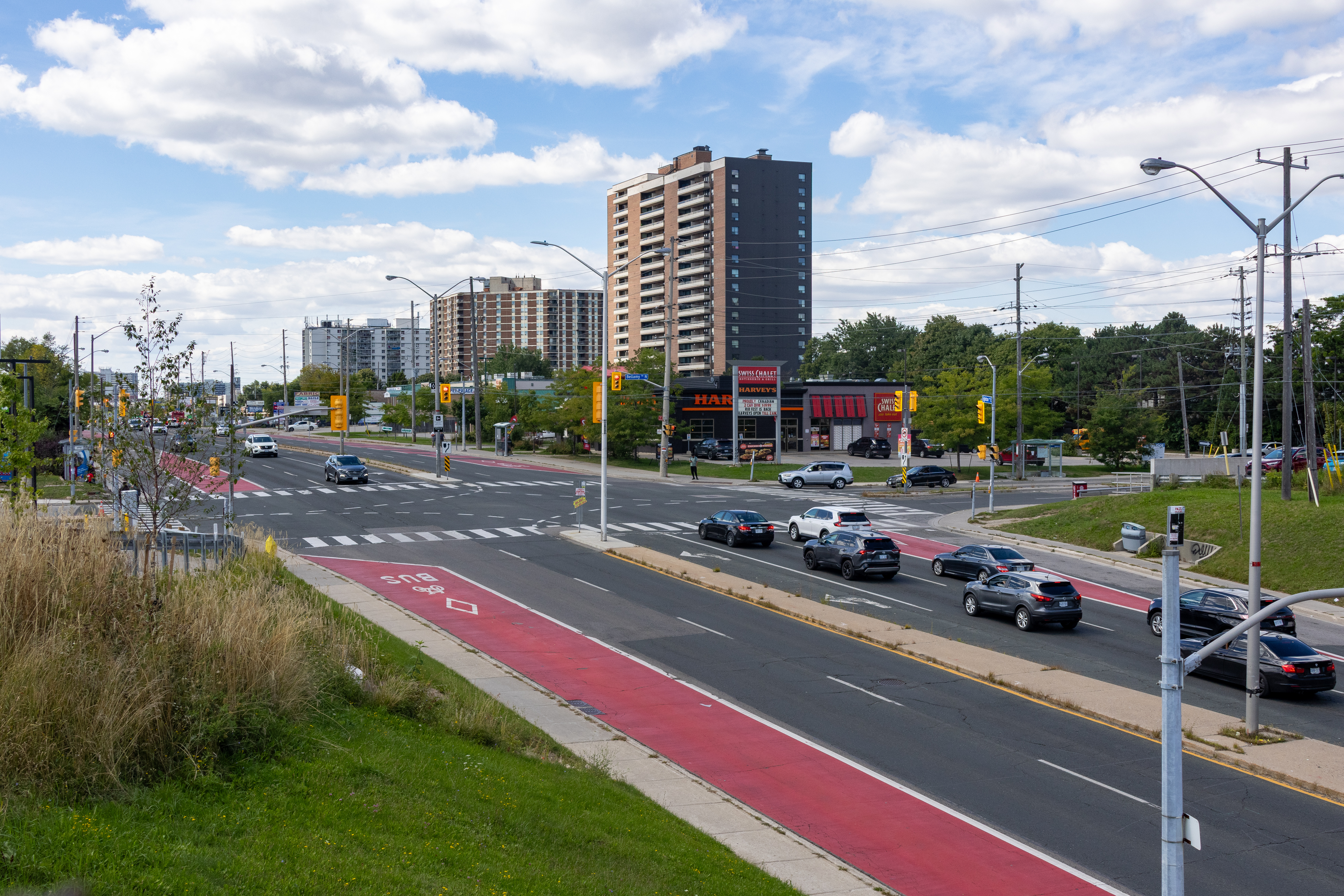
Eglinton Avenue East in Scarborough

Eglinton Avenue runs through a number of neighbourhoods and is residential, for the most part, though it becomes a major commercial area from Allen Road to Don Mills Road. The Eglinton West or "Little Jamaica" area, which stretches from Marlee Avenue / Winona Drive to Keele Street, is home to a number of Caribbean stores.

Eglinton Avenue is one of the few east–west routes north of Bloor Street that cross Toronto uninterrupted in a more or less straight line across the city.

=== Sites along Eglinton Avenue ===
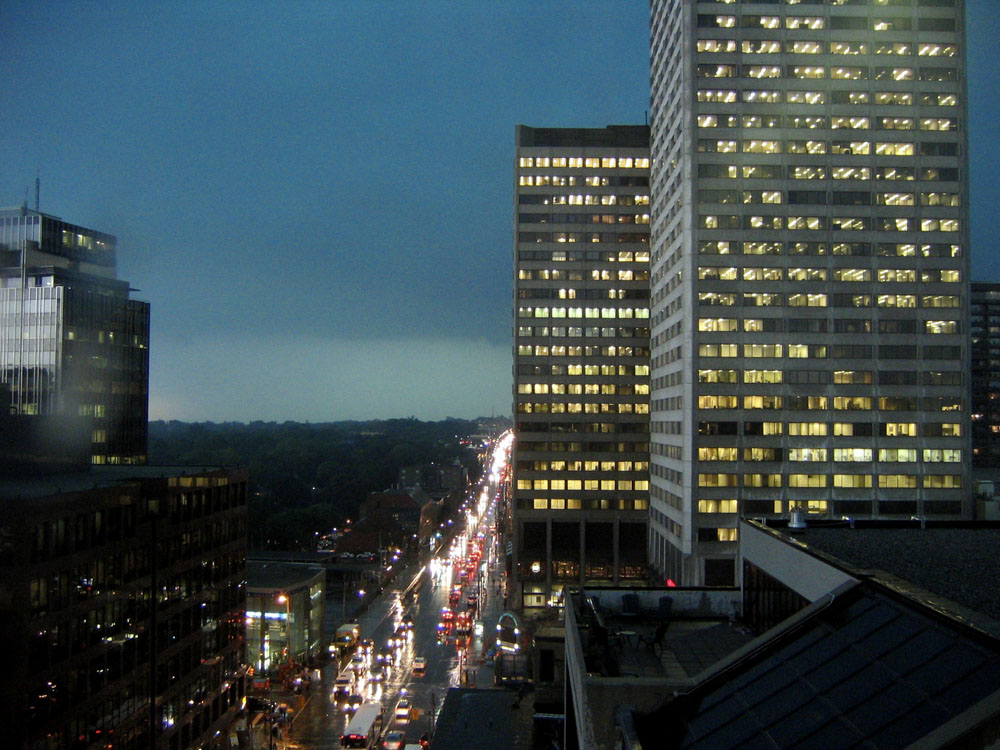
Eglinton Avenue on a rainy day, with Canada Square and the Yonge Eglinton Centre

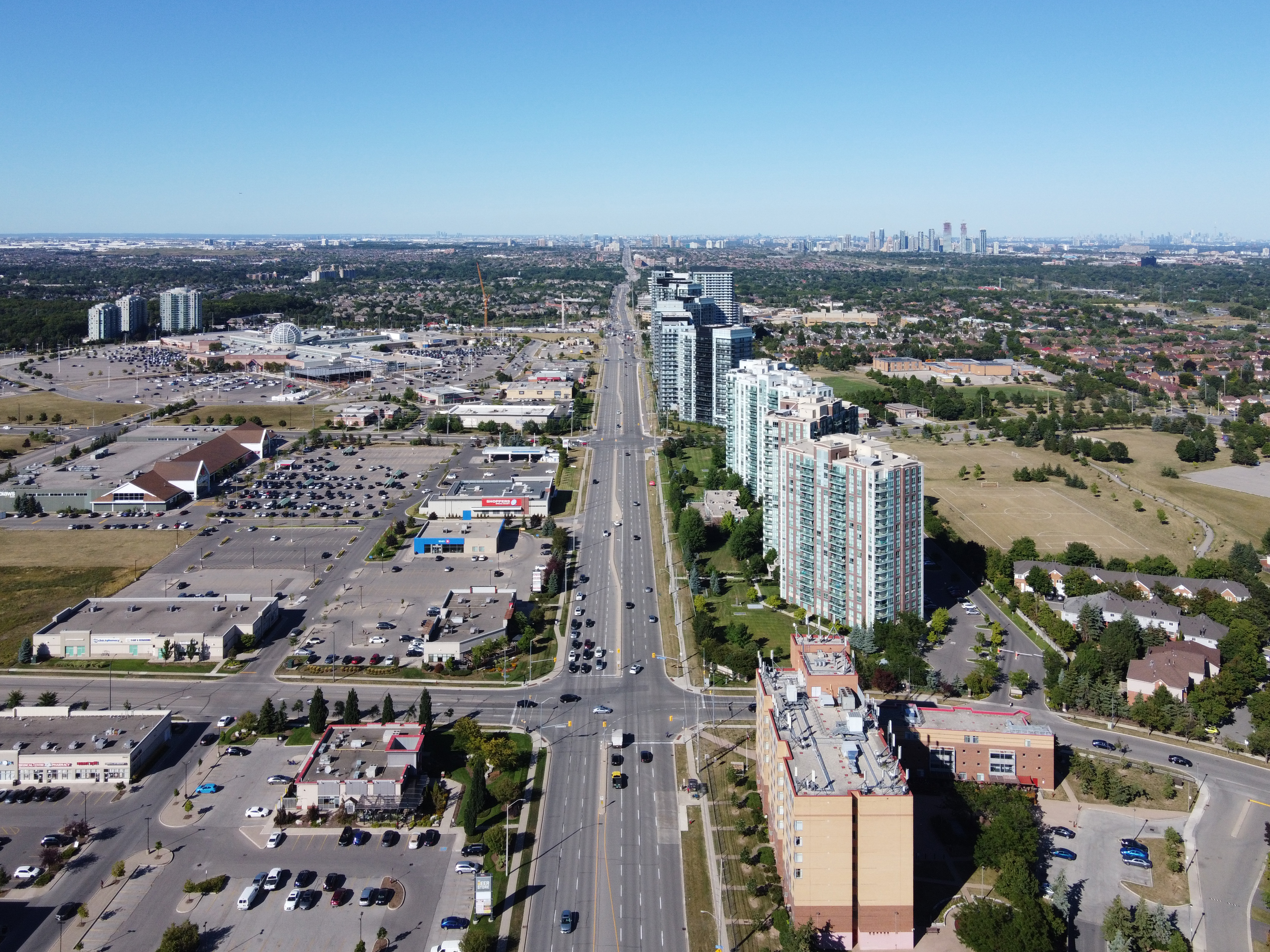
Eglinton Avenue West in Erin Mills, Mississauga

There are many notable sites and landmarks along Eglinton Avenue; from west to east, they include the Erin Mills Town Centre, Centennial Park, Planet Bowl, the Eglinton Flats sports park, Eglinton Park, Little Jamaica and Reggae Lane, Yonge Eglinton Centre, the Canada Square Complex and the TVO Headquarters, Sunnybrook Park, the Ontario Science Centre, the Eglinton Square Shopping Centre, The Golden Mile, and Toronto East Detention Centre.

== Public transit ==
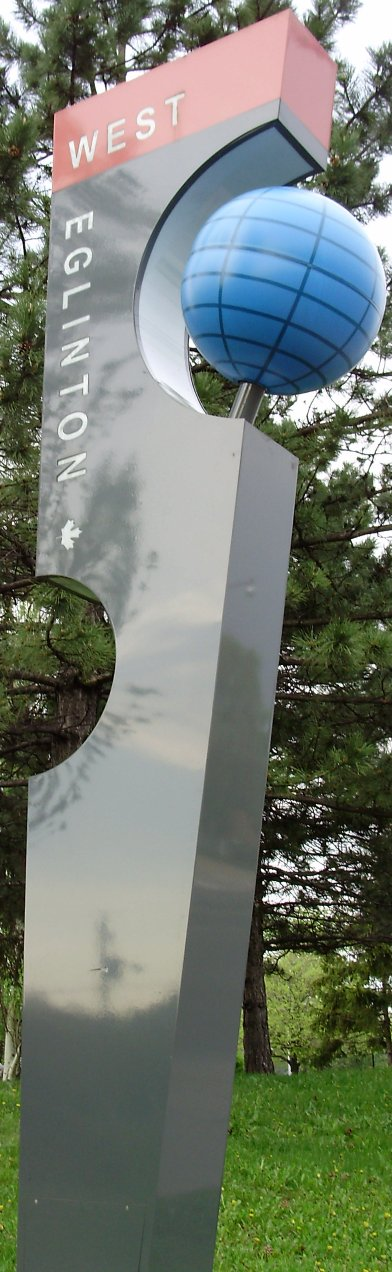
Decorative marker for Eglinton West (Little Jamaica)

=== Bus ===
The Toronto Transit Commission (TTC) operates ten local bus routes on the Eglinton Avenue corridor.

In Mississauga, MiWay provides bus service.

=== Rapid transit ===
==== Light rail ====
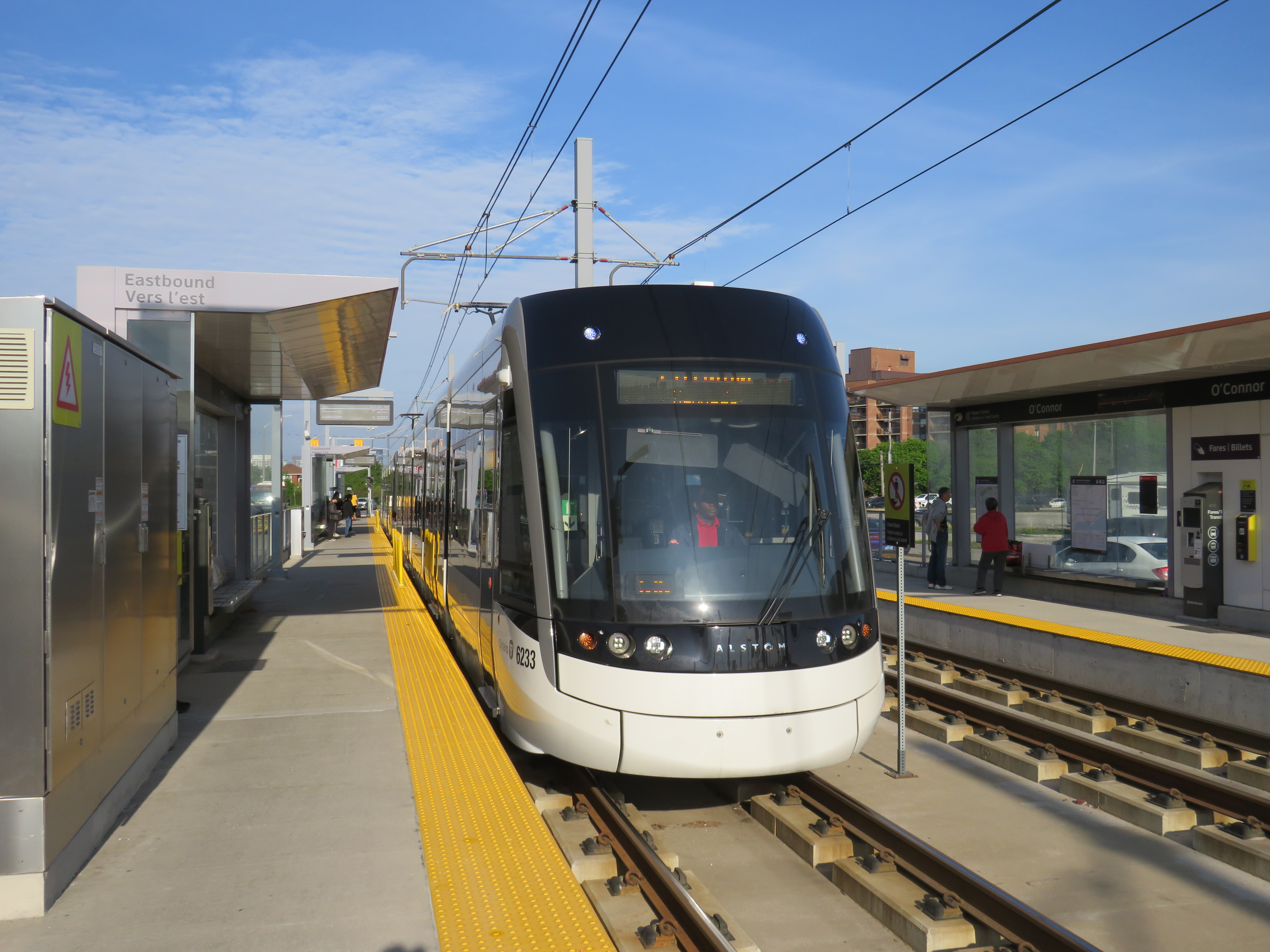
Line 5 Eglinton light rail train at the O'Conner stop in the Golden Mile

Line 5 Eglinton is a light rail line running along Eglinton from Mount Dennis station in the west to Kennedy station in the east, that is part of the Toronto subway system. The western portion of the line consists of fully grade separated stations (with all but Mount Dennis located underground), while the eastern portion is a predominantly non-grade separated line running in the median of Eglinton with on-street stops, except two; Don Valley and Kennedy, being underground. The line opened on February 8, 2026.

There are also three subway stations on parallel subway lines located on Eglinton, where the respective lines cross it: Cedarvale (at Allen Road), Eglinton (at Yonge Street), and Kennedy (at Kennedy Road). All interchange with Line 5.

A second phase is currently under construction to extend the line west to Renforth station, the eastern terminus of the Mississauga Transitway (see below).

==== Bus rapid transit ====
In Mississauga, a portion of the Mississauga Transitway, a grade-separated bus rapid transit line, follows Eglinton Avenue stopping at: Etobicoke Creek, Spectrum, Orbitor and Renforth stations, with Renforth being the transitway's eastern terminus. All of these stations are located at the Airport Corporate Centre at the east end of Mississauga, just south of Toronto Pearson International Airport. Renforth Station is a terminal hub for TTC, GO Transit, and MiWay buses; while the other three are exclusively served by MiWay.

==== Bike lanes ====
After the opening of Line 5, the bus lanes on Eglinton between Black Creek Drive and Kennedy Road were partially removed, providing an opportunity to redesign the street. In 2014, the municipal government of Toronto released a report proposing a redesign of the street to provide generally a four lane roadway over the underground LRT, with a three lanes (two traffic and centre turning lane) between Avenue Road and Mount Pleasant Road. The variation in number of lanes is based on lower car traffic volumes near Yonge Street. The redesign would also provide wider sidewalks and a continuous raised bicycle lane that would be the longest bike lane in the city.

The initial implementation of the redesign would be carried out with the reconstruction at Crosstown line station locations that would be funded as part of the Crosstown line project. Reconstruction between stations will be funded by the city and is proposed to be carried out after completion of the Crosstown line so that it does not interfere with the Metrolinx construction activity.

A planning process called Eglinton Connects drew on public consultation to evaluate options for the redesign.

== See also ==
- Yonge–Eglinton
