= Greenwood College School =

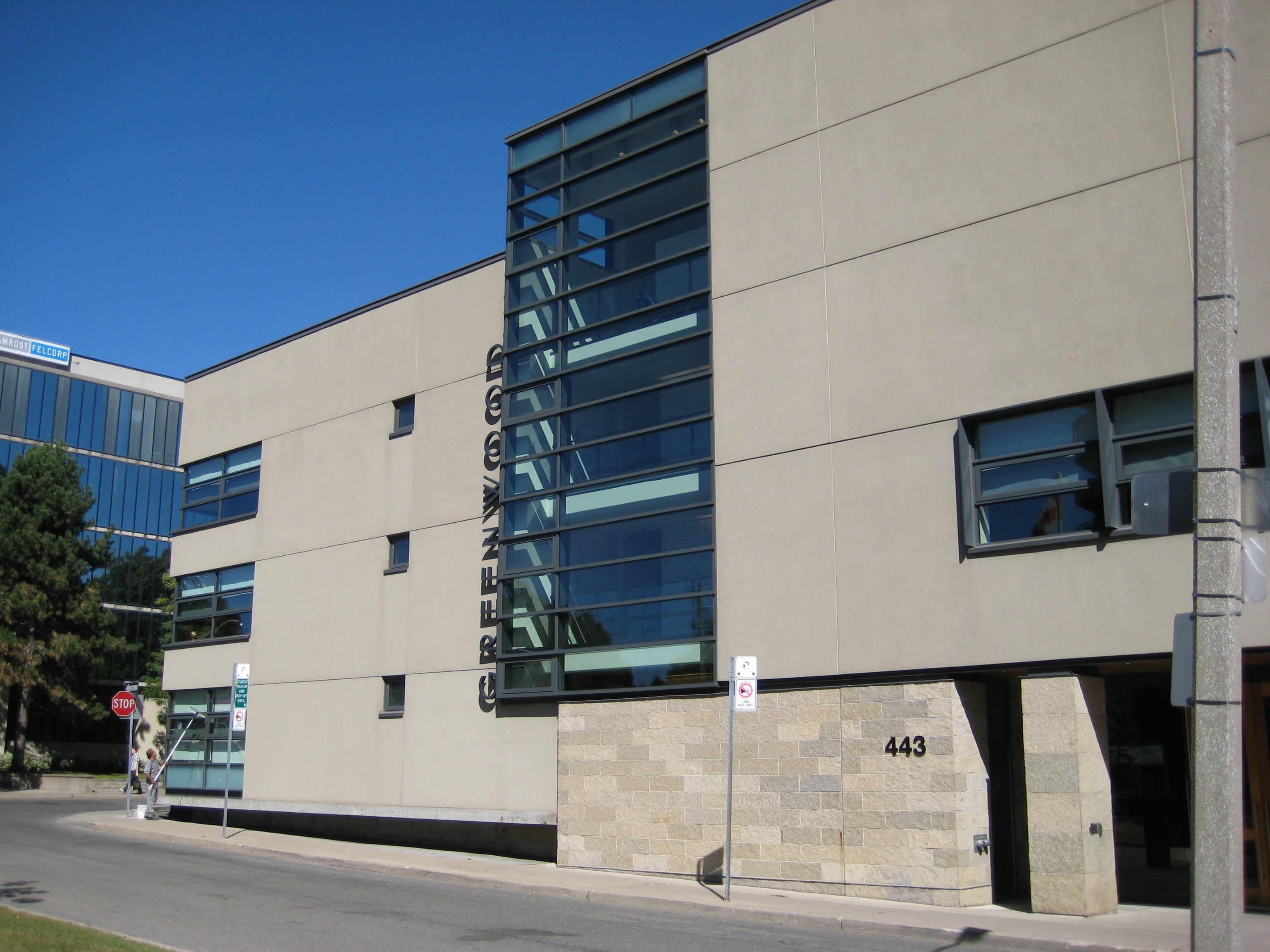

Location
- 443 Mount Pleasant Road; Toronto, Ontario, M4S 2L8; Canada; 43.70015°N 79.38643°W

Information
- School type: Independent day school
- Established: 2002
- Founders: Richard Wernham; Julia West; John Latimer; David Latimer
- Principal: Heather Thomas
- Grades: 7–12
- Gender: Co-educational
- Enrollment: 498
- Language: English
- Campus type: Urban
- Colour: Green
- Mascot: Greenwood Grizzly
- Public transit access: Subway: Davisville; Buses: Route 28, 11
- Affiliations: Canadian Accredited Independent Schools, Conference of Independent Schools of Ontario
- Website: greenwoodcollege.org

Greenwood College School is an independent co-educational middle school and high school located on the south-east corner of Mount Pleasant Road and Davisville Avenue in Toronto, Ontario, Canada.

== History ==
Established in 2002 by Richard Wernham, Julia West, David J. Latimer and John R. Latimer, the school provides an experiential education to over 500 students in Grades 7 through 12. The school is housed in a facility built in 2002 which was expanded and renovated in 2016. In addition to its urban campus, Greenwood also uses several outdoor facilities.

=== Beginnings and growth ===
In the early 2000s, couple Richard Wernham and Julia West, along with father-son duo John R. Latimer and David "Lub" Latimer, imagined of a co-educational school in Toronto that would be an alternative to the foremost independent schools in Toronto, which were mostly single sex and offered the International Baccalaureate.

Founding principal David Thompson left Greenwood in June 2008 become the Headmaster at Lakefield College School. The former Vice-Principal, Allan Hardy, was appointed his successor.

Greenwood completed a renovation and expansion of its main facility in 2016. The expansion increased the school's square footage by 120% and added several new facilities, including a second gym, a performance theatre, new science labs, large Learning Community classrooms and a rooftop terrace outdoor classroom. Greenwood's sports teams use nearby facilities including Leaside Arena, the University of Toronto Athletic Centre, Deer Park Pool and Sunnybrook Park.

=== Post expansion ===
After completing the renovation and expansion, Greenwood's student body grew to 500. Founding principal David Thompson left Greenwood in June 2008 to become the Headmaster at Lakefield College School. The former Vice-Principal, Allan Hardy, was appointed his successor. Upon Allan's retirement in 2018, Sarah Bruce became the Principal. In 2024, former Deputy Head of School Heather Thomas was appointed as her successor.

=== Expanding the campus ===
In September 2026 Greenwood celebrated the opening of its new greenspace. The practice field and outdoor gathering space and will be used by gym classes, athletics teams, classes and by students during breaks and lunch.

== Notable alumni ==
Tom Wilson (ice hockey) - Forward for the Washington Capitals

Tom Ramshaw - Olympic Sailor

== Fees ==
The tuition fee for the 2026-2027 academic year is $49,530. For new students there is a one-time registration fee of $10,000. Tuition covers student participation in all school programs, including the Outdoor Education Program, which includes trips to locations across Canada. Like many independent schools with a Bring Your Own Device program, students are required to purchase a laptop with the required programs installed.

== Outdoor education ==
With academics, Greenwood College School's students are immersed in the school's Outdoor Education Program. Greenwood's Outdoor Education program takes students outside for shared experiences, community building and facing challenges together to build lifelong connections. It includes trips in the fall and winter, considered to be essential character-building experiences that encourage the development of perseverance and leadership.

The founders intended to create a school with strong academics, as well as a learning environment where children are given the opportunity to learn outdoors and leadership and teamwork are essential.

== Service learning ==
Greenwood's Service Learning program gives students the opportunity to participate in a variety of initiatives. On Wednesdays, classes start late to give staff the opportunity to participate in professional development sessions as students take part in community service.

== See also ==
- Education in Ontario
- List of secondary schools in Ontario
