= Midtown, Toronto =

Human settlement in Toronto, Ontario, Canada

Coordinates: 43.7077°N 79.3991°W

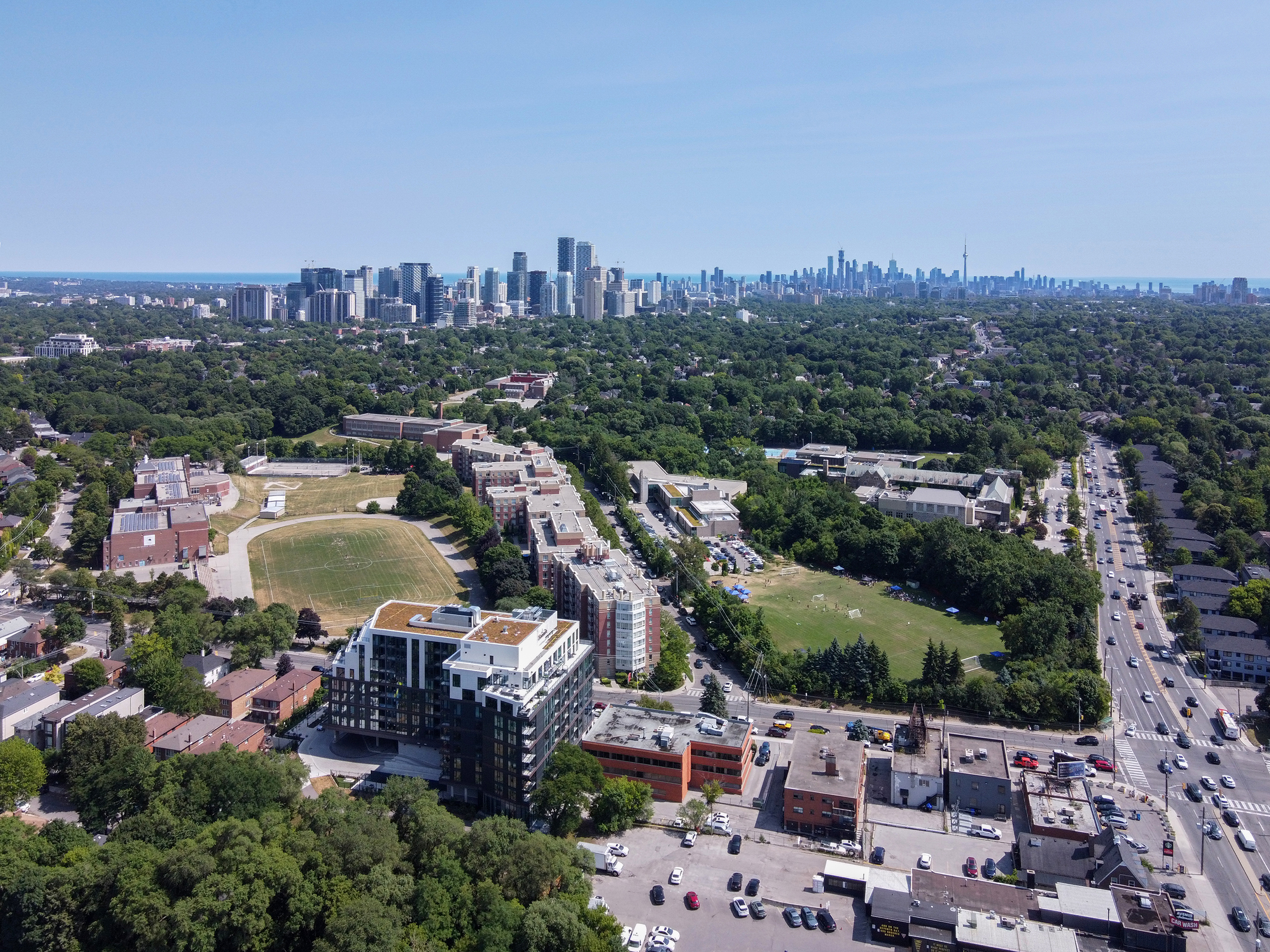
View toward midtown, with the downtown area in the far distance on the right

Midtown is one of the major districts outside the downtown core of Toronto, Ontario, Canada. Located in the northern part of Old Toronto, its borders are roughly defined by St. Clair Avenue to the south, Eglinton Avenue or Lawrence Avenue to the north, Bayview Avenue to the east and Dufferin Street to the west. The central neighbourhood of the area is Yonge–Eglinton.

== Neighbourhoods ==
Rosedale, Forest Hill, Deer Park and Summerhill are generally viewed as the most upscale cluster of neighbourhoods in the midtown area (rivalled only by Lawrence Park). The intersection of Yonge and St. Clair (located in Deer Park) is the main commercial centre for these neighbourhoods. It is home to the historic Mount Pleasant Cemetery and the secluded St. Michael's Cemetery.

Davisville Village encompasses the area east of Yonge Street over to the west side of Bayview Avenue, and south from Eglinton down to Merton Street, to the north of the park-like setting of Mount Pleasant Cemetery. It is home to many residential high-rise apartments and boutique shops. Its many large Victorian and Tudor-style homes are among the most expensive residences in the city. In 2008, the Mount Pleasant Village BIA was established and has been a significant asset in the evolution of the area, while maintaining the heritage integrity of the buildings. With the exception of Merton Street, Davisville Village's lack of new high-rise condominium development preserves a look and feel similar to that found in Toronto's other upscale low-rise neighbourhoods such as Lawrence Park, the Beaches and the Kingsway.

The centre of midtown and one of Toronto's four major business centres, "Yonge and Eg" is at the junction of North Toronto (east and west of Yonge, north of Eglinton), the northern edges of Davisville Village (southeast) and Chaplin Estates (southwest). The immediate area includes several high-rise office buildings, the busy Eglinton Station, and a large mall-office complex. It is home to numerous restaurants, two multiplex cinemas and a diverse retail strip. Since about 2000, this area has been undergoing a surge in commercial and residential development, with a massive influx of young urban professional singles and families.
