= Deer Park, Toronto =

Coordinates: 43°41′17″N 79°23′38.5″W

Deer Park Eastern Ojibwa: Mashquoteh, lit. 'meadow, prairie'
- Neighbourhood
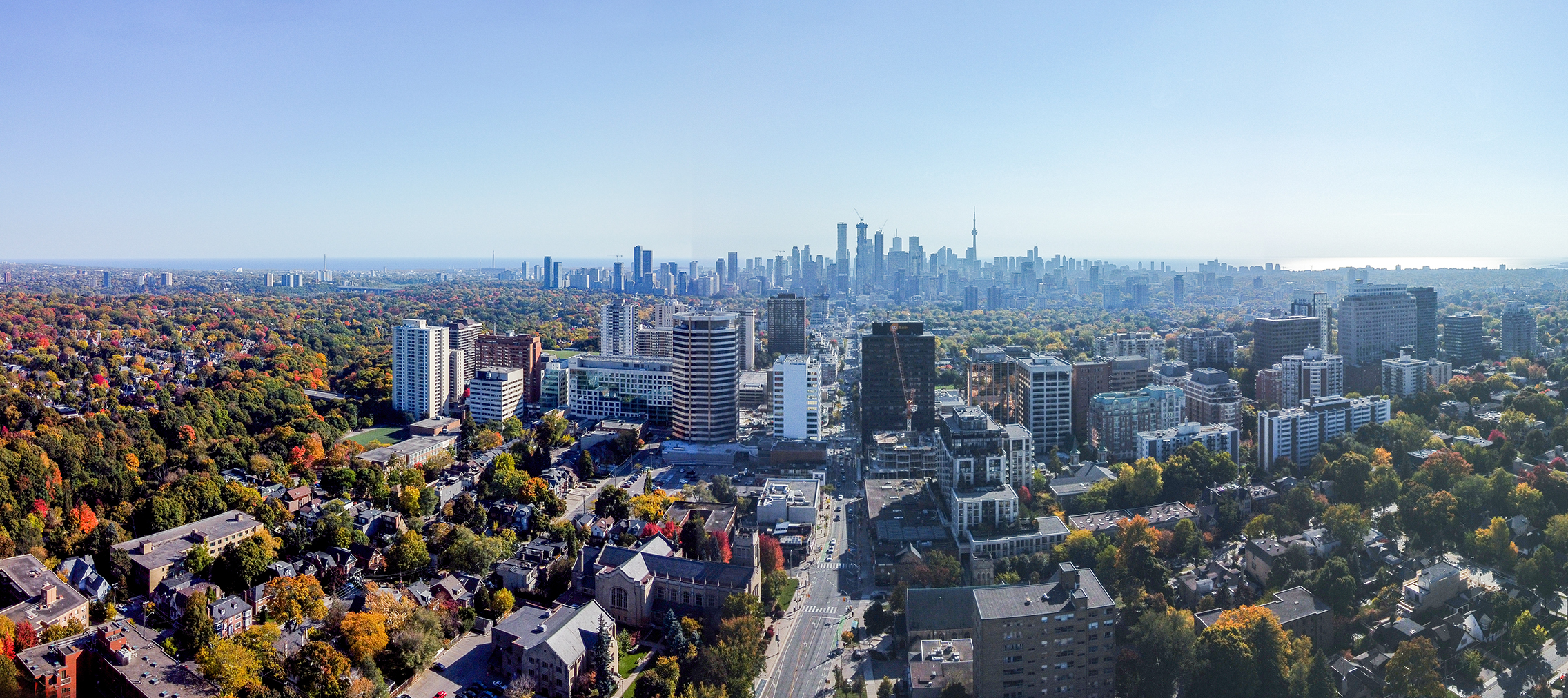
- Southward view of Deer Park in 2024

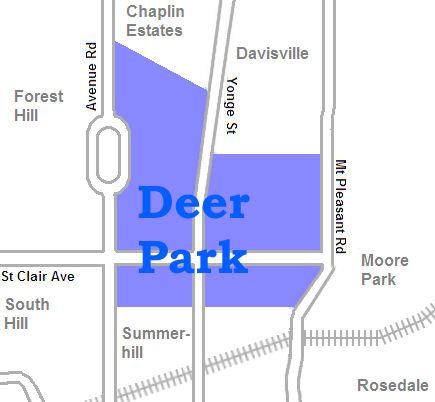
- Location of Deer Park within Toronto
- Country: Canada
- Province: Ontario
- City: Toronto

Deer Park is a neighbourhood in Toronto, Ontario, Canada. It is centered on the intersection of Yonge Street and St. Clair Avenue. Its boundaries are the Vale of Avoca section of Rosedale Ravine in the east, Farnham Avenue and Jackes Avenue in the south, Avenue Road and Oriole Parkway in the west, the Beltline Trail in the north on the west side of Yonge Street, and Glen Elm Avenue in the north on the east side of Yonge Street. For the purposes of social policy analysis and research, the Toronto government’s Social Development & Administration division includes Deer Park within the City of Toronto's official "Rosedale-Moore Park" and "Yonge-St.Clair" neighbourhood profiles. Deer Park is in Ward 22, which is represented by Councillor Josh Matlow at Toronto City Council.

The commercial area along the main streets is known simply as Yonge and St. Clair. Marked by a cluster of office buildings, the area also includes a number of restaurants, shops, and services, as well as the St. Clair subway station, which is the terminus for the 512 St. Clair streetcar.

== History ==
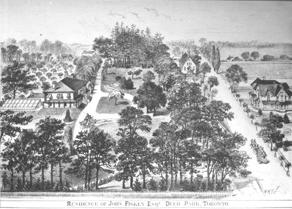
Deer Park in 1878

The Mississaugas had called this area Mashquoteh, meaning 'meadow' or 'prairie'. The current name of the neighbourhood dates from 1837, when the Heath family purchased 40 acres (16 ha) of land at the northwest corner of Yonge and St. Clair (then the Third Concession Road) and named it Deer Park. By the 1850s, the area included a racetrack, a school, and a hotel at which patrons could feed deer that roamed the Heath family's land. The Heath property was subdivided in 1846 and was sold off entirely by 1874.

In 1891, Upper Canada College moved from its urban location on King Street West to the then still-rural Deer Park area, establishing a large campus that remains in the same location today, interrupting Avenue Road north of St. Clair Avenue.

In 1931, De La Salle College moved from its downtown location to an estate named 'Oaklands' that was originally purchased and built upon by Senator John Macdonald in 1858. Oaklands forms part of the southern boundary of Deer Park, running eastward along the escarpment from Avenue Road.

Deer Park was annexed by the City of Toronto in 1908. By the 1930s, it had become an upper-middle class residential district, which it remains today. The intersection of Yonge and St. Clair is also the site of extensive nodal commercial development.

In 1999, journalist Robert Fulford described the character of the neighbourhood – "sandwiched between Forest Hill on its western flank and Moore Park to the east, Deer Park is utterly unlike either of them—it's more commercial, a fast-changing community dominated by apartment dwellers."

On February 14, 2017, a large fire broke out at a local private members' club, the Badminton and Racquet Club of Toronto. The conflagration led to the evacuation of nearby residents, street closures, and the diversion of some TTC routes. The clubhouse section that burned was originally a streetcar barn dating back to the 1880s (as a horsecar barn for the then Metropolitan Street Railway), which had been converted to badminton courts in 1924 when it was sold by the Toronto Transportation Commission.

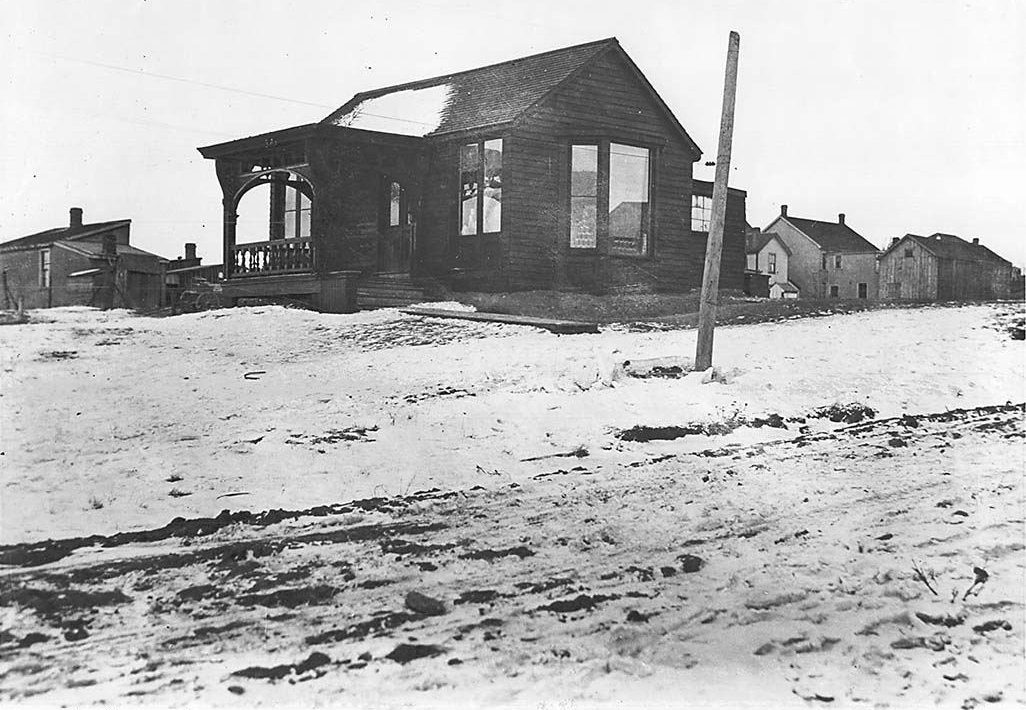
Butcher and grocery store in 1908, the year the community was annexed by Toronto

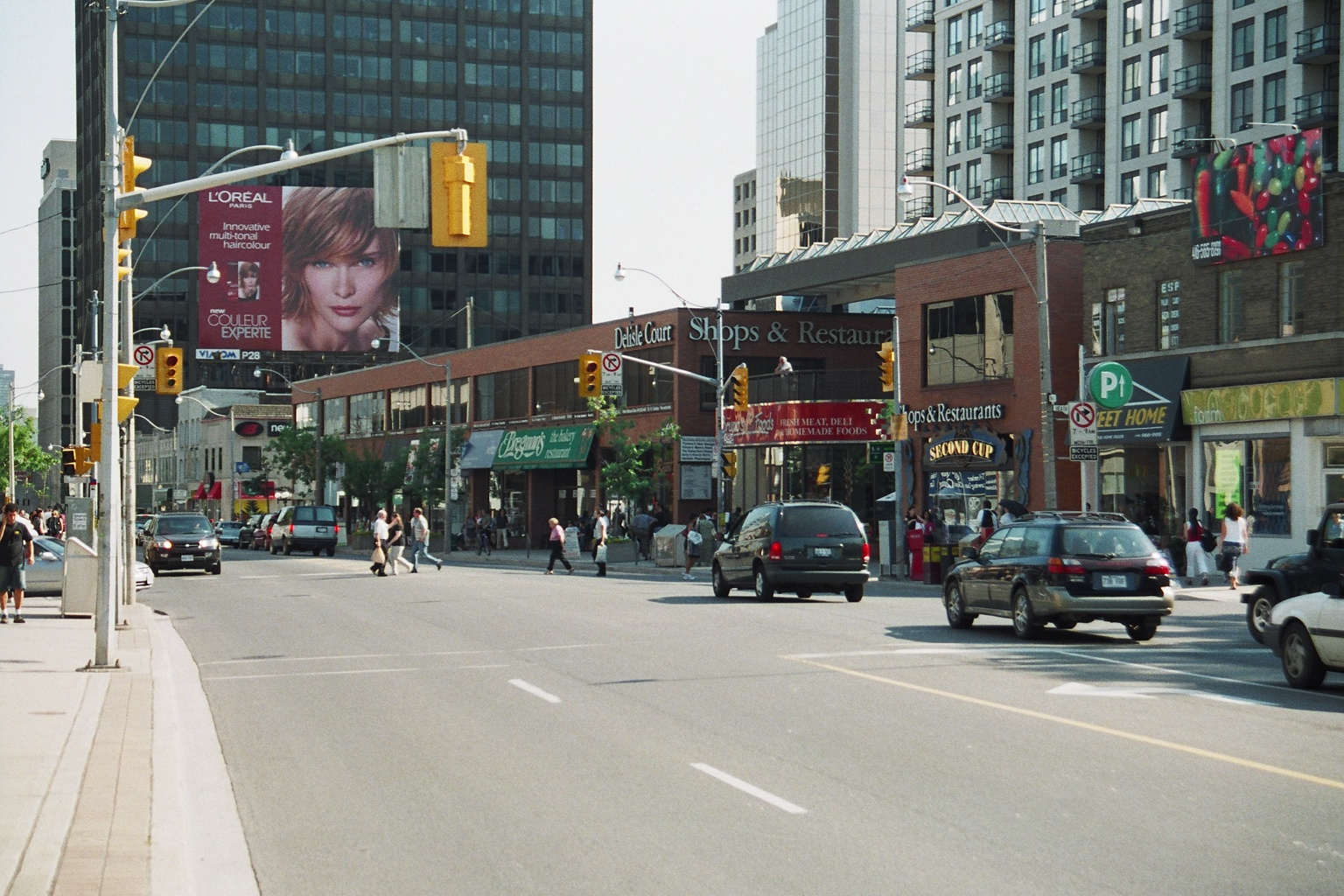
Looking down Yonge Street, south of Heath Street West, in 2003

== Education ==
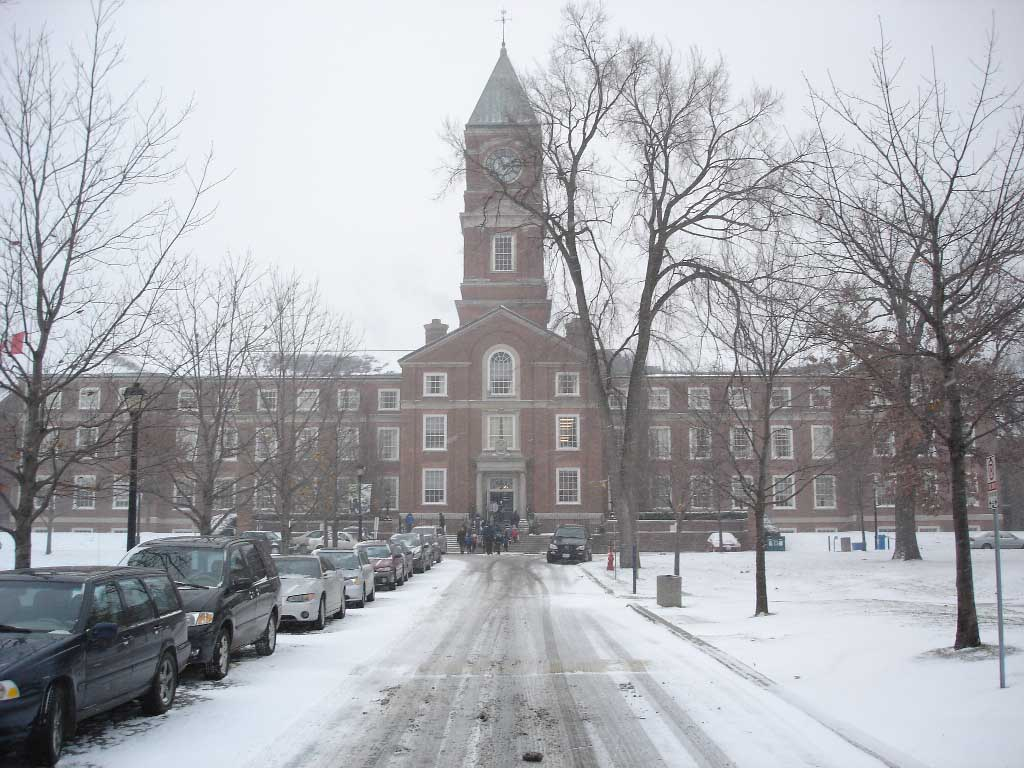
Half of Upper Canada College's main campus is located in Deer Park

In Deer Park, secular English-oriented public schools are operated by the Toronto District School Board. In the City of Toronto, secular French-oriented public schools are provided by Conseil scolaire Viamonde, while publicly funded English and French Catholic schools are operated by the Toronto Catholic District School Board and the Conseil scolaire catholique MonAvenir respectively. However, none of the latter three school boards operate a school in Deer Park, although one was previously operated as a secondary school.

The following schools are located in the Deer Park area:

- Deer Park Public School is a public school located at 23 Ferndale Avenue. It has been serving the community for about 125 years. Deer Park has many challenging academic, sport and art programs. They include basketball, football, ultimate frisbee, Me To We club, swim team and the theatre production. Deer Park serves students from kindergarten to grade 8.
- De La Salle College is a Roman Catholic co-educational private school that was established in 1851 as a boys school. Beginning in the late 1960s until June 1994, this school was operated as a public separate secondary school from 1987, which was a sister school to St. Joseph's College School on Wellesley Street. The school was re-privatized in 1994, and Marshall McLuhan Catholic Secondary School replaced De La Salle in 1998.
- The Linden School is a private school for girls.
- The York School is a co-educational private school.
- Upper Canada College is a private school for boys that was established in 1829.

== Landmarks ==
- Avoca Ravine
- David A. Balfour Park
- Vale of Avoca (bridge)

=== Churches ===
- Calvin Presbyterian Church
- Christ Church Deer Park
- Deer Park United Church (the congregation now worships at 26 Delisle Avenue)
- Yorkminster Park Baptist Church

=== High-rise buildings ===
- Imperial Oil Building (now known as Imperial Plaza)
- Wittington Tower

=== Historic houses ===
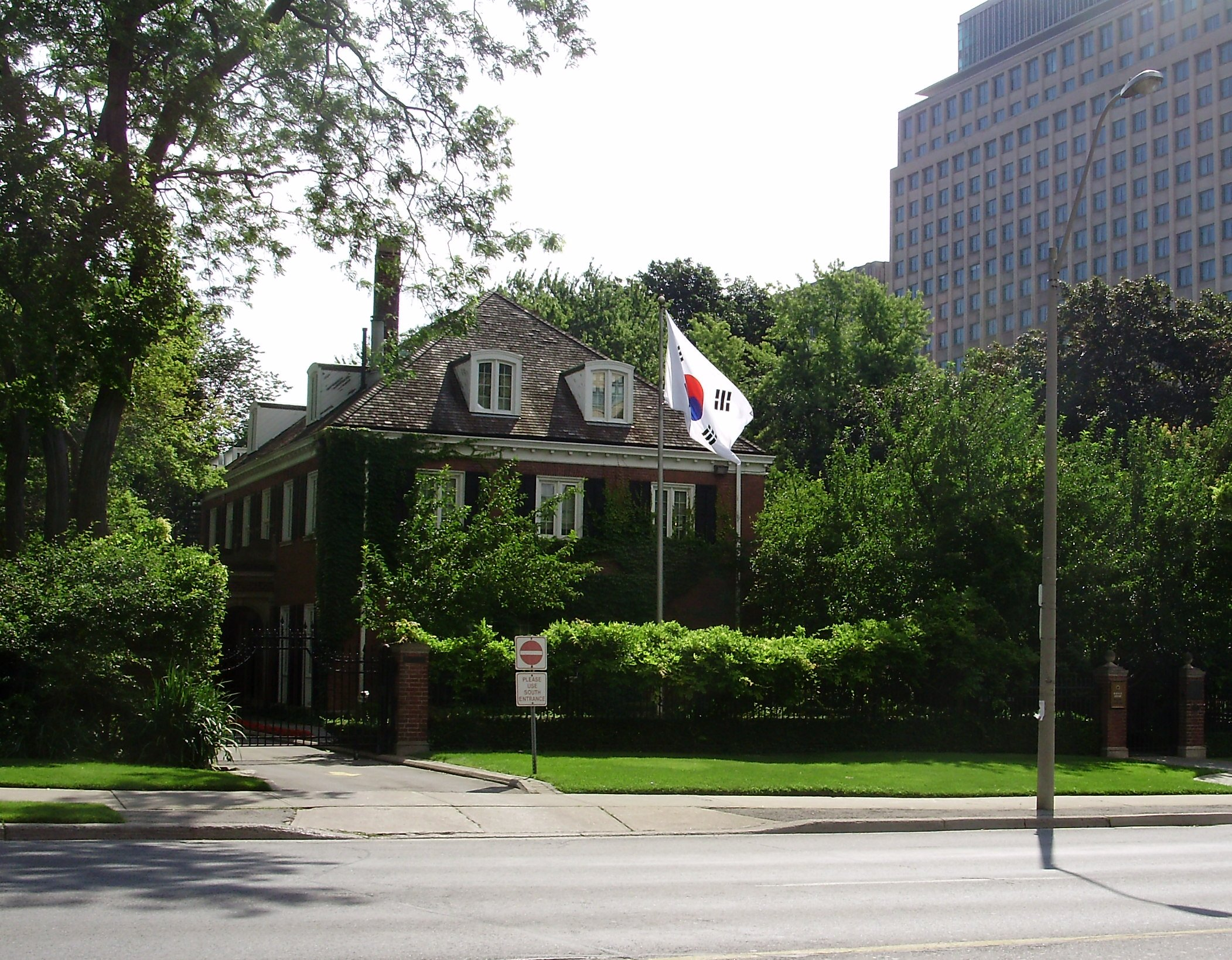
555 Avenue Road, built in 1930 for Howard Ferguson, who served as Premier of Ontario from 1923 to 1930

- 555 Avenue Road – built in 1930 for Howard Ferguson (Premier of Ontario from 1923 to 1930), it now serves as the Consulate General of the Republic of Korea.
- 50 Farnham Avenue – Farnham Lodge was built in 1844 as a home for Edward Hooper, then altered around 1910. It is the oldest surviving house in Deer Park and one of the oldest buildings in Toronto.
- 131 Farnham Avenue – currently the location of De La Salle College, an estate named "Oaklands" was once part of the Crown land that was deeded in 1798 to the Honourable John Elmsley. In 1858, John Macdonald — a successful dry goods merchant who would become the only Liberal appointee to the Senate by Canada's founding prime minister, Sir John A. Macdonald — acquired 35 acres (14 ha) of the land from the Anglican Church. The Oaklands mansion has been designated as a historical building by the City of Toronto government, as an example of local Gothic Revival architecture.
- 32 Heath Street West – John Palmer, the last owner of Lawton Park, built this house for his daughter, Mrs. Henry Baird, and it is used today by the Canadian Mothercraft Society as a daycare centre and school.
- 40 Heath Street West – at one time owned by the Anglican Church of Canada, Archbishop Desmond Tutu stayed in the house, which was used for visiting clerical dignitaries. The police occupied the house while staking out the Boyd Gang, which resulted in their arrest as noted below. The house was demolished after 2010 and replaced by a new home.
- 42 Heath Street West – after a stakeout, Canada's most notorious bank robber of the day, Edwin Boyd, leader of the Boyd Gang, was captured in this house at 6:00 am on March 15, 1952. Even Toronto's mayor of the day, Allan Lamport, got into the act, escorting Boyd out of the house accompanied by Sergeant Adolphus (Dolph) Payne of the Toronto police force.
- 50 Heath Street West – constructed in 1923, the McNamara House is a rare example of the Prairie School of architecture in Toronto.

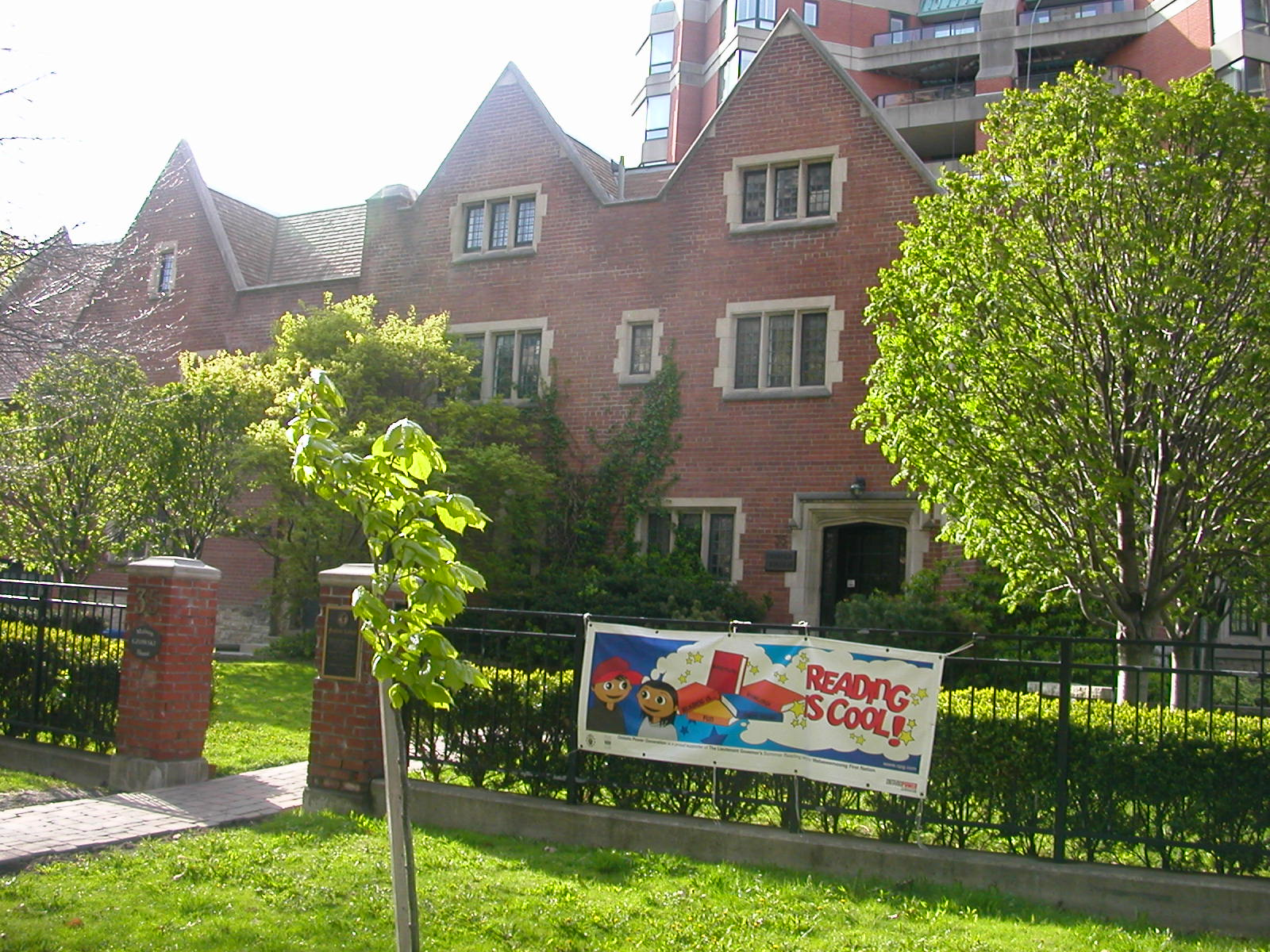
35 Jackes Avenue, a mansion that was built in 1914 for Robert Laidlaw

- 35 Jackes Avenue – completed in 1914 as the home of businessman Robert Laidlaw, it currently serves as the headquarters of Frontier College and is now called Gzowski House.
- 76 Lonsdale Road – John Ford House was built in 1875 for Captain John Ford Jr. It has a mansard roof, which is typical of Second Empire architecture.
- 73 Lonsdale Road – a cottage in the Second Empire style that was built around 1878 by Captain John Ford Jr. as a home for his parents.

=== St. Michael's Cemetery ===
Deer Park is also home to one of Toronto's oldest burial grounds, St. Michael's Cemetery. It was opened by the Roman Catholic Archdiocese of Toronto on September 28, 1855. There are some 29,000 graves in the cemetery.

Ten acres in size, St. Michael's has the unusual characteristic of being surrounded on all sides by the backs of buildings, thus making it nearly invisible from the street. It is bound on the north by stores, apartments and office buildings along St. Clair Avenue West, on the east by stores and office buildings along Yonge Street, on the south by houses and Toronto Fire Services Station 311 along Balmoral Avenue, and on the west by houses along Foxbar Road. Entrance to the cemetery is gained through an alley off Yonge Street.

The cemetery's octagonal mortuary vault was used to store bodies in the winter until the ground thawed. Designed by architect Joseph Sheard, who was also the mayor of Toronto in 1871–72, the vault was designated a historic property under the Ontario Heritage Act in December 1975.

=== 1331 Yonge Street ===
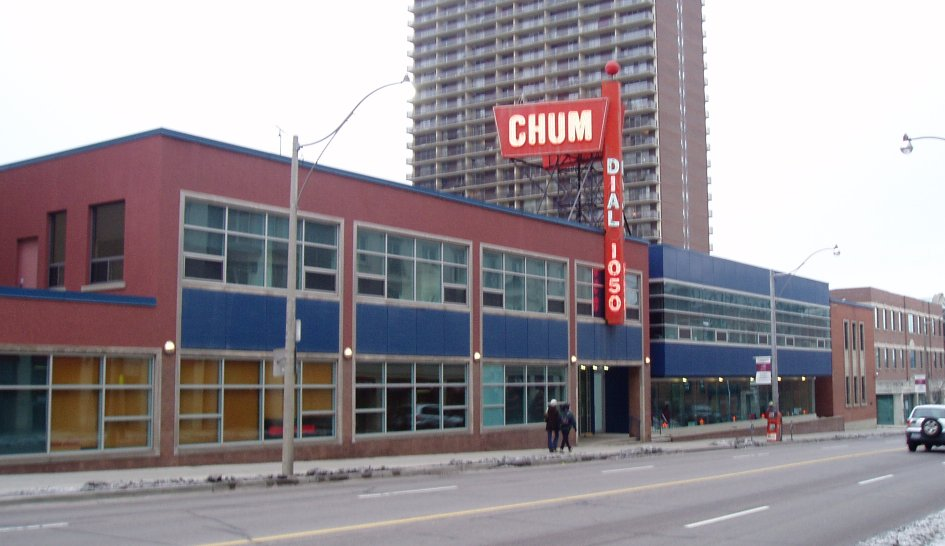
1331 Yonge Street in 2005

A studio complex was located on 1331 Yonge Street, three blocks south of St. Clair Avenue, the building previously constructed as a book bindery and showroom. In 1959, the building was renovated as the headquarters of CHUM Radio, a division of CTVglobemedia (now known as Bell Media), and to the studios of the company's Toronto radio stations, CHUM and CHUM-FM as well as CHUM Radio's national operations. The most prominent feature of the building's exterior was the famous "CHUM Dial 1050" neon sign over the front entrance.

In July 2008, CTVgm announced that it would sell the building to developer Aspen Ridge Homes for $21.5 million. The stations were expected to move to 250 Richmond Street West, a downtown location at Richmond Street and Simcoe near 299 Queen Street West, in 2009. The neon sign was moved to the new location.

In preparation for the move, the stations held an open house on November 15, 2008, inviting listeners to visit for a tour of the historic building and an exhibit of CHUM's radio memorabilia.

The company's radio stations were officially relocated to 250 Richmond Street West on August 19, 2009, which is now Bell Media Radio. After the stations moved out, 1331 Yonge Street came under the ownership of Aspen Ridge Homes and was home to their offices, as well as the offices for the advertising agency, "The Brand Factory." In September 2016, the building was officially demolished, in order for a condominium complex to be built on the site.

== Notable residents ==
- Classical pianist Glenn Gould (1932–1982) lived in Apt. 902 at 110 St Clair Avenue West from 1962 until his death in 1982. He is buried in nearby Mount Pleasant Cemetery.
- J. E. H. MacDonald, a founding member of the Group of Seven painters, lived at 40 Duggan for several years until his death on September 26, 1932.
- Pierre Salinger (1925–2004) was press secretary to presidents John F. Kennedy and Lyndon Johnson, and campaign manager to Robert F. Kennedy. He was mere metres away when R.F.K. was assassinated. He lived at 37 Lonsdale Road, while very young, from 1929 to 1932/3.
- Novelist Joy Fielding (born 1945) wrote Kiss Mommy Goodbye while living at 83 Lonsdale Road during the last three years of the '70s.
- Writer Farley Mowat (1933–2014) lived at 90 Lonsdale Road for six months in 1939–40.
- Poet Margaret Avison (1918–2007) lived in Apt. 104 at 150 St Clair Avenue West from 1964 to 1970.
- Actor William Hutt (1920–2007) lived at 18 Ferndale Avenue for several years in his childhood.
- Architect Rod Robbie (1928–2012), lived at 16 Cornish Road from 1966 until his death. He and his wife Enid Robbie are buried at Mount Pleasant Cemetery.
- Former Prime Minister John Turner (1929–2020) lived his later years in Deer Park. Turner is buried at Mount Pleasant Cemetery.
