= David A. Balfour Park =

Park in Toronto, Canada

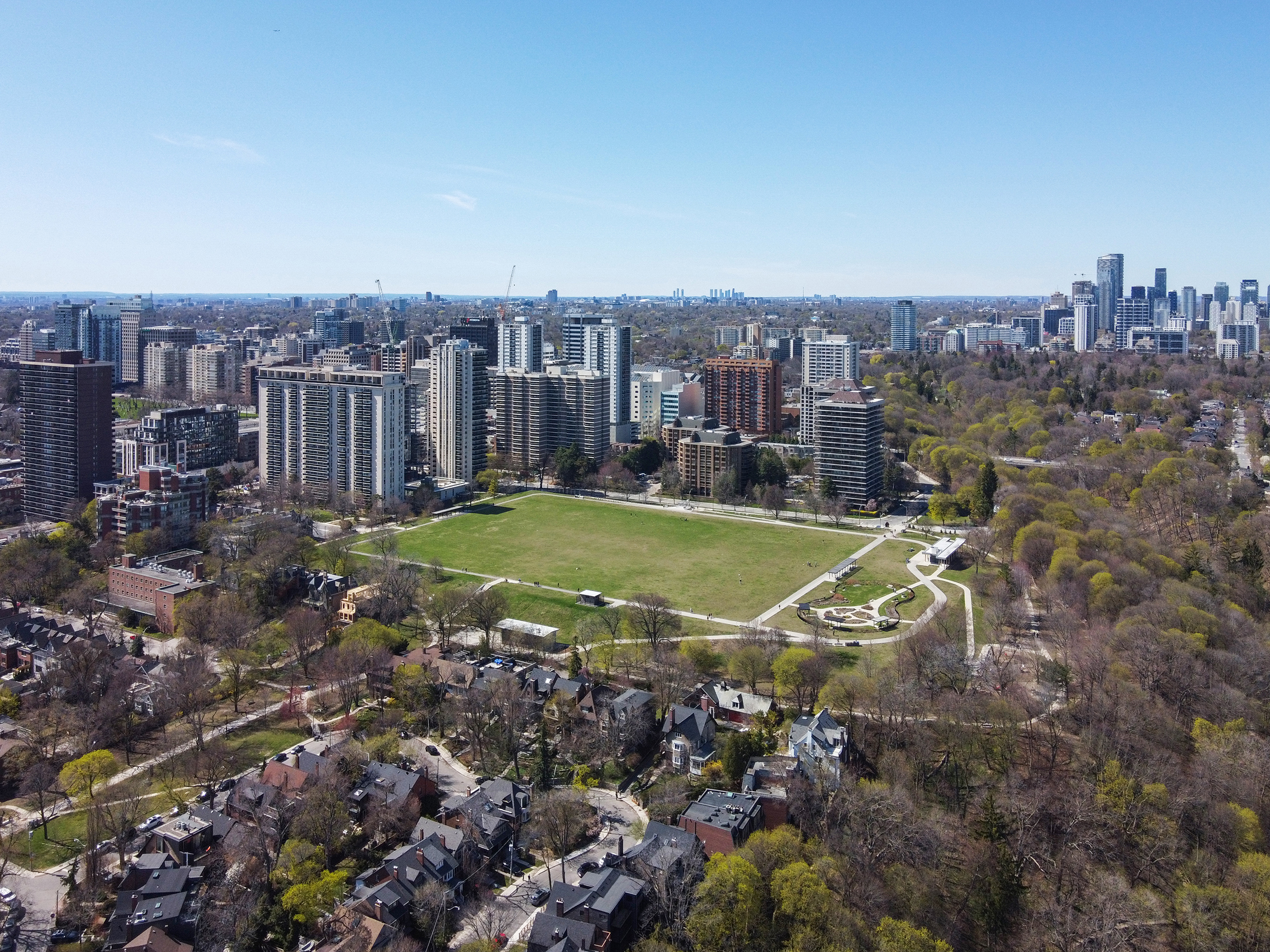
- Northward view of the park in 2025

- Location within Toronto
- Type: Public park
- Location: 75 Rosehill Avenue, Toronto, Ontario, Canada
- Coordinates: 43°41′13″N 79°23′13″W
- Created: 1960s
- Operator: City of Toronto

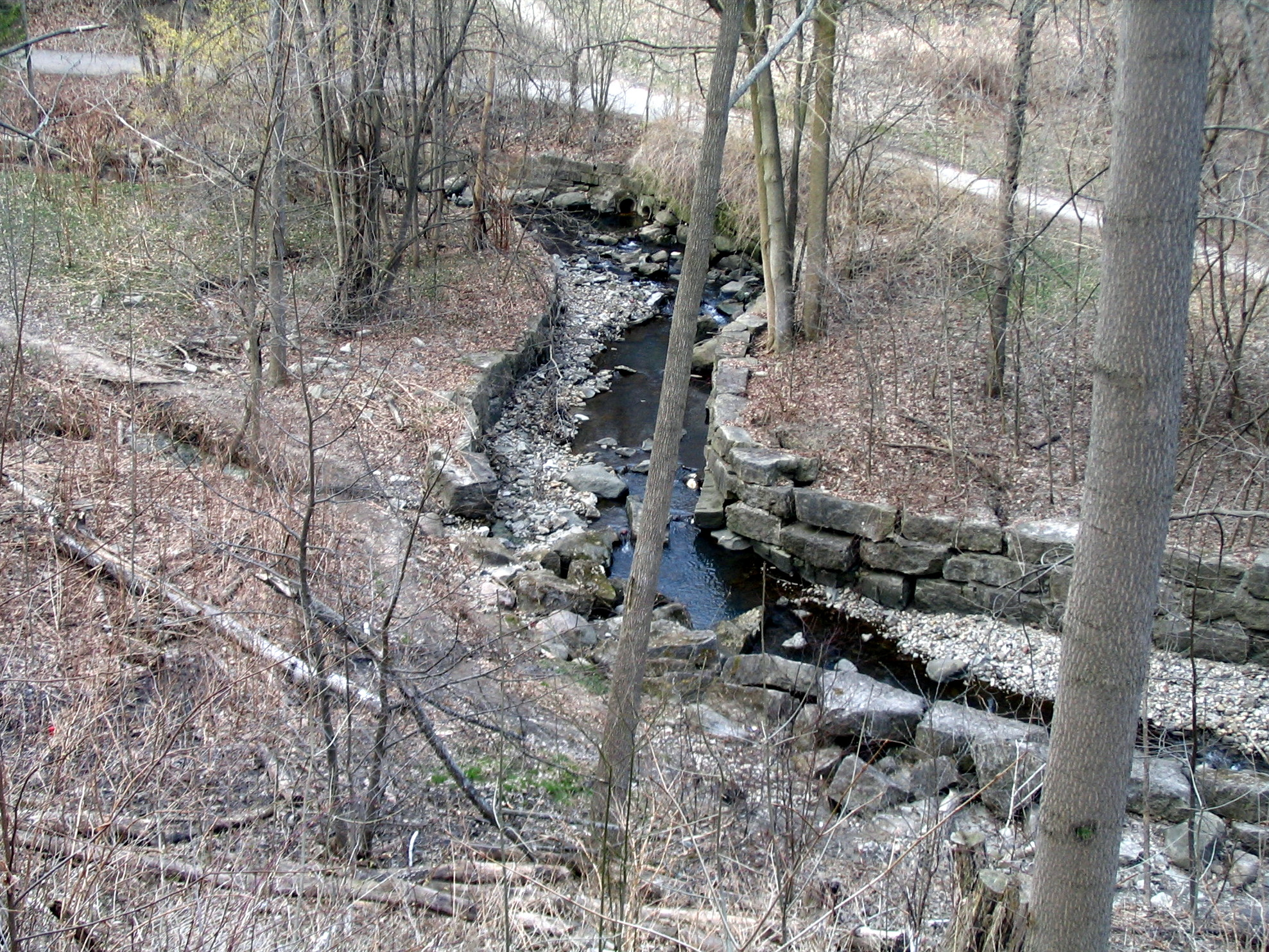
The Vale of Avoca Ravine in David A Balfour Park

David A. Balfour Park is an urban park in the Deer Park neighbourhood of Toronto near the intersection of Yonge Street and St. Clair Avenue. The park made up of 20.5 hectares of green space consisting of the greenery-covered Rosehill Reservoir and the entirety of the Vale of Avoca with its system of trails.

The park is named after David A. Balfour, a former Toronto city Councillor.

== History ==
=== Pre-colonial ===
The area occupied by David A. Balfour Park has a long history prior to the colonization and the formation of Canada where it was an important hunting ground of the indigenous peoples, specifically the Mississaugas who referred to it as mishkodae (lit. "prairie") and maintained the area as a meadow to attract animals into the environment.

=== Colonial and confederation period ===
During the colonial period the area was originally the site of several estates residences, among them that of Walter Rose who built Rosehill in 1839 and two law partners that built Summer Hill in 1840. The transformation of area into a park began in 1873 when Toronto chose the Rosehill site and acquire the land for its first major water reservoir, the Rosehill Reservoir, with the adjoining Vale of Avoca ravine transformed into Reservoir Park. In the 1900s this portion of the ravine extending down just south of the Canadian Pacific rail tracks became also known as Summerhill Park.

The park, with it reservoir and ravine, were actively maintained as a garden with many decorative non-native trees planted. The reservoir was also freely accessible, with its frozen surface being used for recreation of the nearby residents.

=== Modern period ===
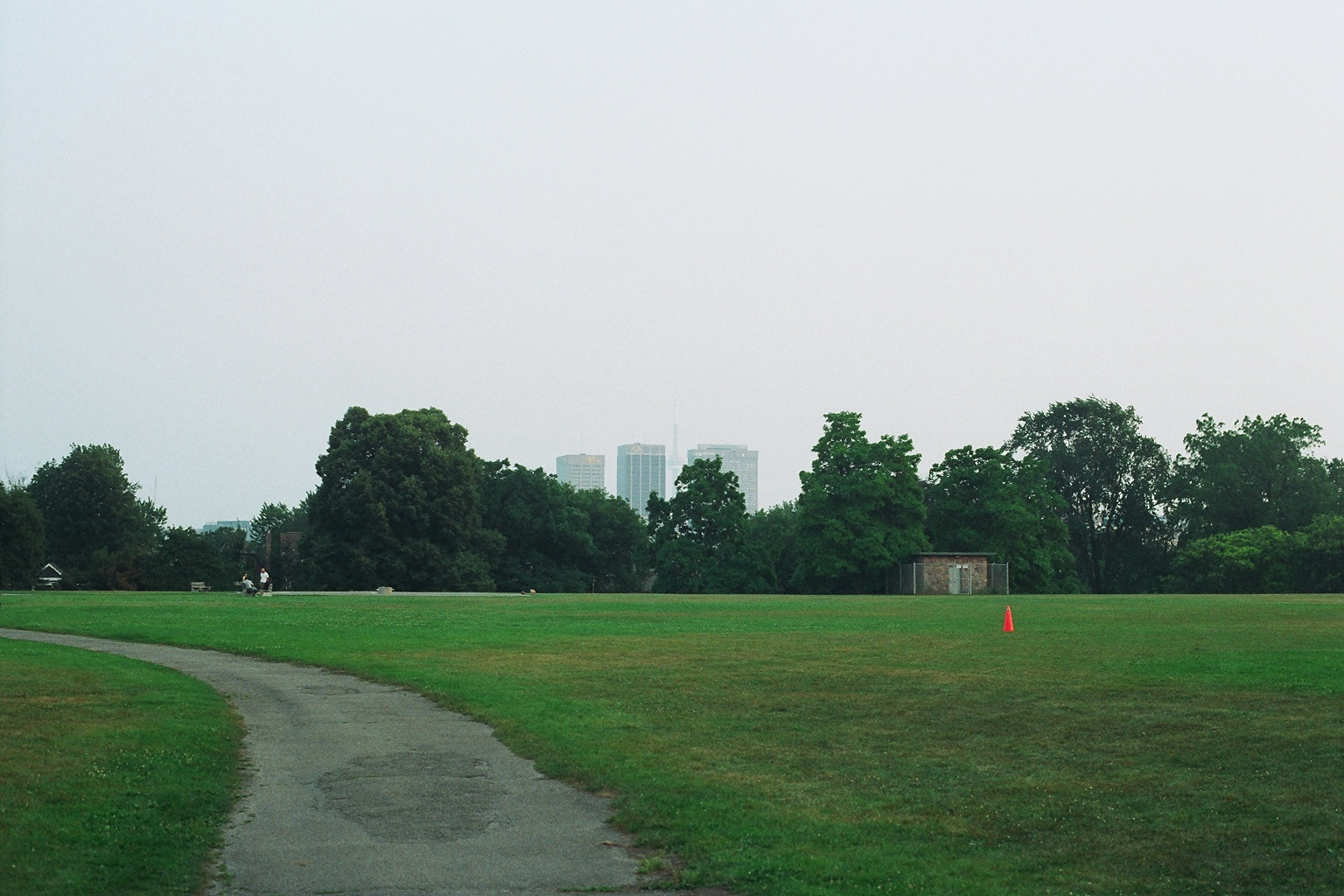
View of Downtown Toronto (in 2003) from the Rosehill Reservoir portion of David A. Balfour Park. The grass covered surface of the enclosed underground reservoir is only about 0.6 meters deep and consisted mostly of clay soil.

During World War II, a fence was put up around the periphery of the open reservoir to protect the water supply from being sabotaged. Post-war, the decision was made to deepen and cover the reservoir to increase its capacity, as well as to maintain the sanitation of the water from human pollution and animal contamination. As consolation to the nearby residents in losing a well loved water feature in their neighbourhood, the city agreed to include several concrete lined ponds on the top of the enclosed reservoir.

The park and its ravine plays an important role in the lives of the surrounding Midtown inhabitants in their recreation and personal lives. In 2020, the City of Toronto undertook major renovations. The park partially reopened in November 2022, with an official full re-opening in spring 2023. In addition to repairs and upgrades to the reservoir and water systems, the upgrades removed the fountains and ponds which were the main feature of the park previously, but saved the Water Molecule Sculpture which is now installed on the north side of the park. The new park features a ring trail around the park, two shade pergolas and renovated and upgraded public bathroom facilities at the northeast corner of the park.

After the 1986 murder of Alison Parrott, an 11-year-old resident of the nearby street of Summerhill Avenue, a green space south of the park was dedicated to Alison and the children of Summerhill and named "The Little Park".

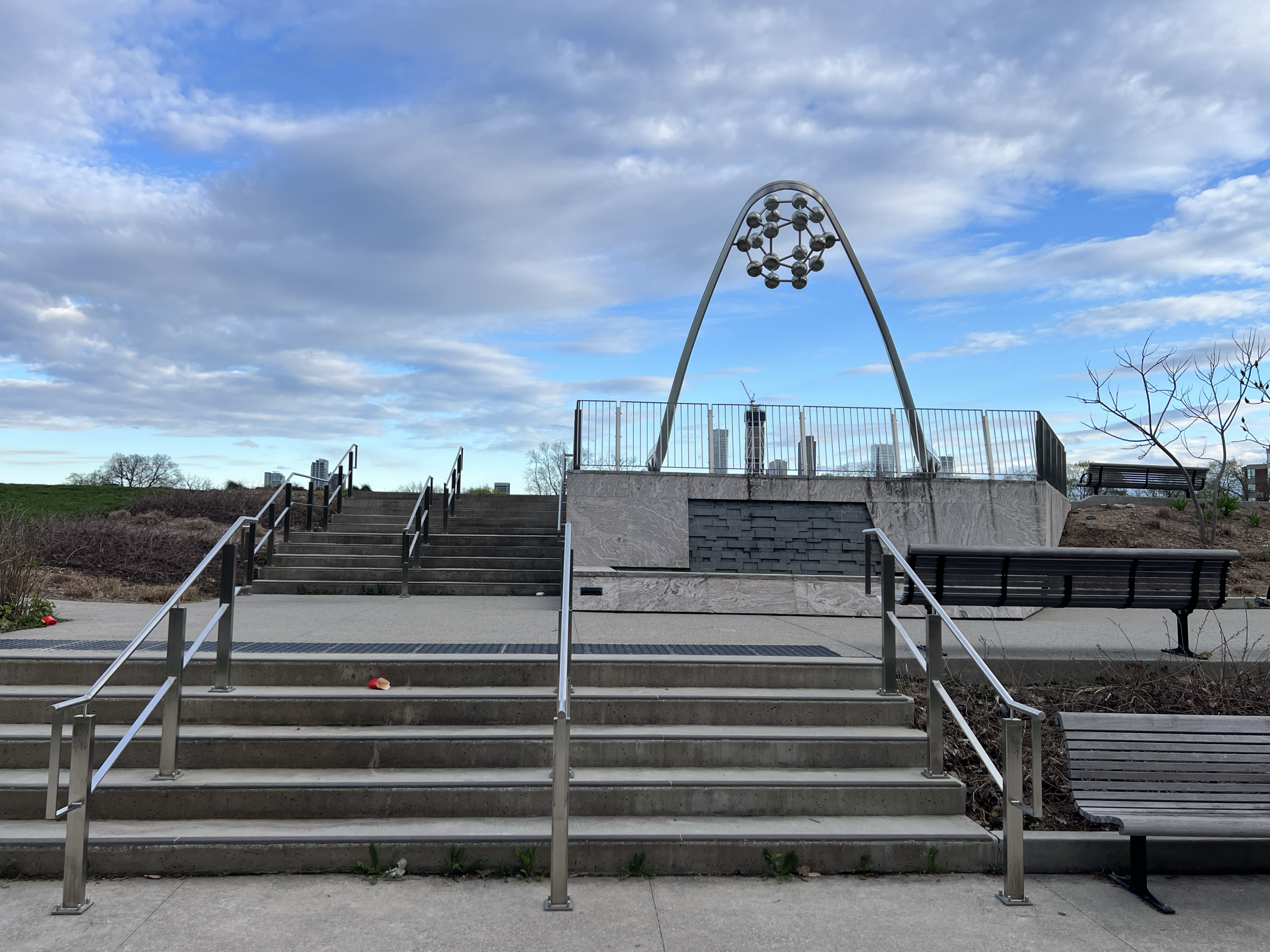
Water Molecule Sculpture: Large abstract sculpture of a molecule held up by an angled arch at David A. Balfour Park
