= St. Clair Viaduct =

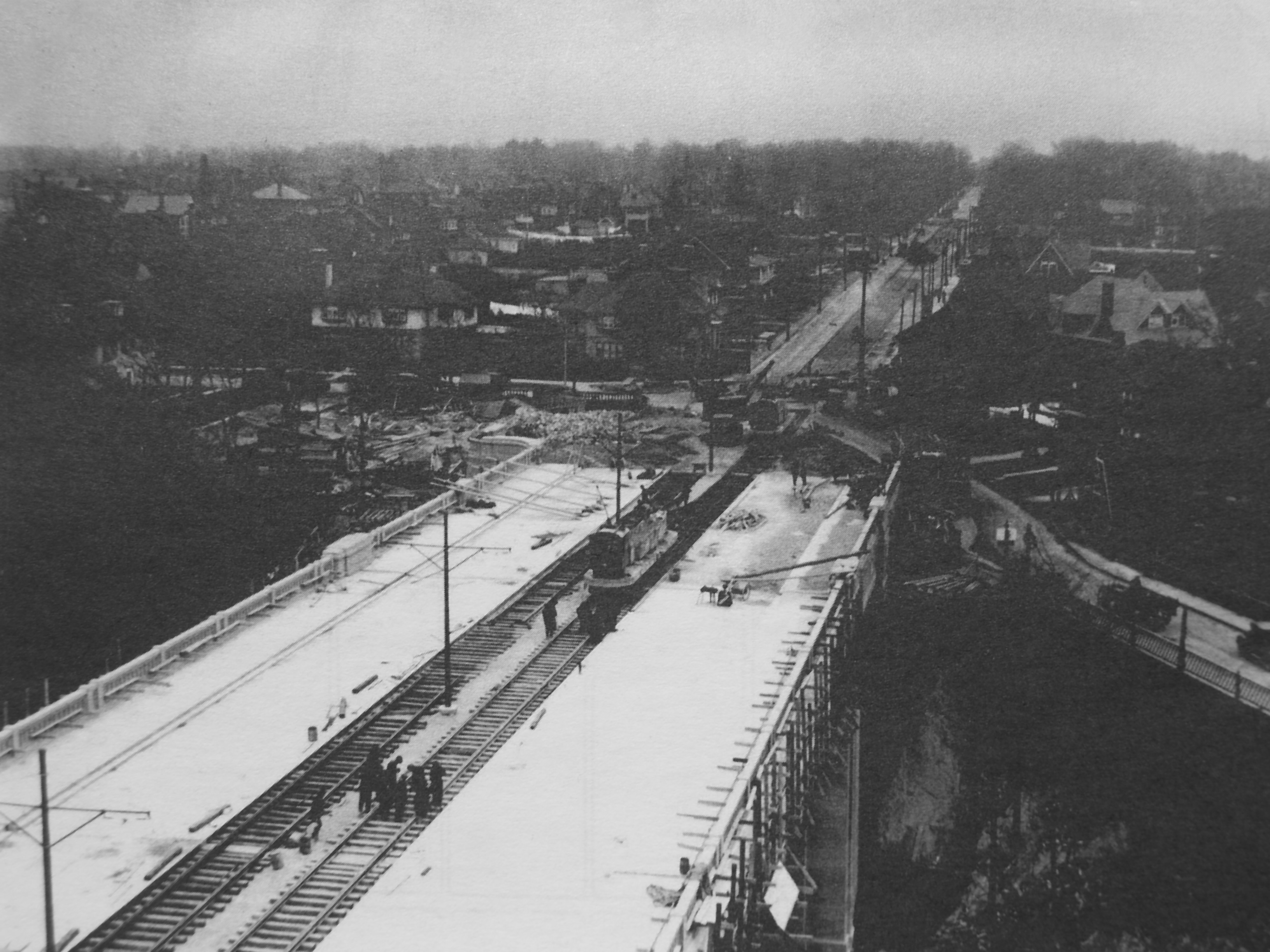
- St. Clair Viaduct nears completion, November 3, 1924
- Coordinates: 43.689160°N 79.388882°W
- Carries: 5 lanes of St. Clair Avenue (originally 4 lanes with 2 streetcar tracks)
- Crosses: Vale of Avoca (ravine)
- Locale: Toronto, Ontario, Canada
- Maintained by: Toronto Transportation

Characteristics
- Design: Truss arch bridge
- Total length: 155.1 m (509 ft)
- Width: 19.7 m (65 ft)
- Clearance above: 27 m (89 ft)
- Clearance below: Yellow Creek

History
- Opened: 1924

Statistics
- Daily traffic: St. Clair Avenue East
- Toll: No

Location
- Interactive map of St. Clair Viaduct

The St. Clair Viaduct is a large viaduct that carries St. Clair Avenue East over a ravine of the same name, in Toronto, Canada. Located just east of Yonge Street, the current triple arch bridge was built to connect the well-established community of Deer Park with the developing community of Moore Park in the 1920s. The bridge replaced an older structure and straightened the alignment of St. Clair Avenue in the process.

A small channelized tributary of the Don River, known as Yellow Creek, weaves beneath the central span. Much of David A. Balfour Park (named for the Toronto city councillor) consists of a nature trail that winds through the Vale of Avoca Ravine; the park also includes a grassy recreational area near an inlet into which Yellow Creek flows.

The ravine it crosses is named after a poem by Thomas Moore.

== History ==
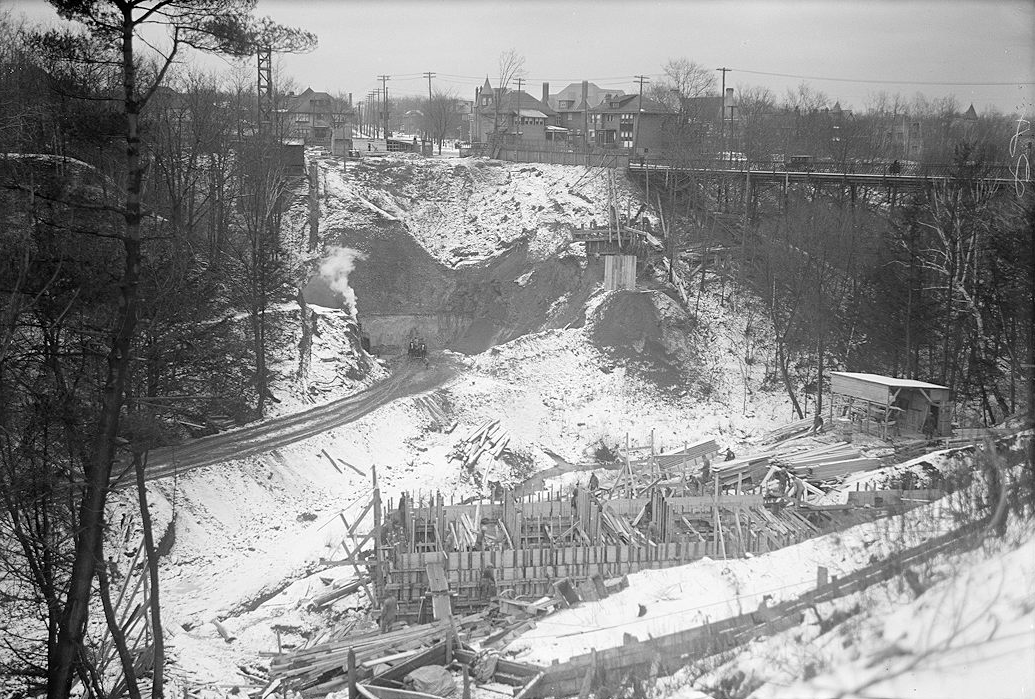
The Vale of Avoca bridge under construction in the winter of 1923

The first bridge over the Vale of Avoca was an iron bridge, built in 1888. The bridge was built by John Thomas Moore in the hopes of encouraging investment in his new subdivision, Moore Park. Under the condition that he build the bridge, the Township of York purchased a strip of land across the valley and leased it to Moore, who was in return given the St. Clair Avenue right-of-way between Avoca Avenue and Inglewood Drive.

On December 16, 1912, Moore Park was annexed into Toronto at the instigation of landowners eager to obtain municipal services. Due to growing safety concerns regarding the old iron bridge, Toronto City Council authorized construction of a new bridge in 1922. Unlike the old bridge, this one would follow the straight alignment of St. Clair Avenue East (renamed in 1914). Two houses were expropriated and demolished, and the new structure built over two years at the cost of $716,653.58 (equivalent to $12.8 million in 2025) It opened to traffic in November or December, 1924.

The old bridge remained open and operational throughout, with traffic detouring around construction on the eastern side. The former structure crossed the valley on an angle, beginning at St. Clair in the east and crossing to Pleasant Boulevard; it followed an electric line already in place. The eastern abutment and several concrete footings are still in place near the rim of the ravine as reminders of the old bridge. After completion of the new structure, the old one was promptly dismantled, and the material used to forge the fence that lines Avoca Avenue along the west side of the ravine. The Yellow Creek stream at the bottom was subsequently channelized to slow erosion.

In 1973, the City of Toronto government officially named the ravine as The Vale of Avoca, after either the poem by Thomas Moore (after whom John Thomas Moore is named), or the River Avoca river valley in Ireland. The bridge was renovated in 1985.

== Popular references ==
The events in Margaret Atwood's novel The Blind Assassin begins on the recounting of a car accident at the Vale of Avoca bridge:

Laura had gone through a Danger barrier, then right off the St. Clair Avenue bridge into the ravine far below.

— Margaret Atwood, The Blind Assassin, 2000
