= Yellow Creek (Toronto) =

Stream in Ontario, Canada

Coordinates: 43.6871217°N 79.3861142°W

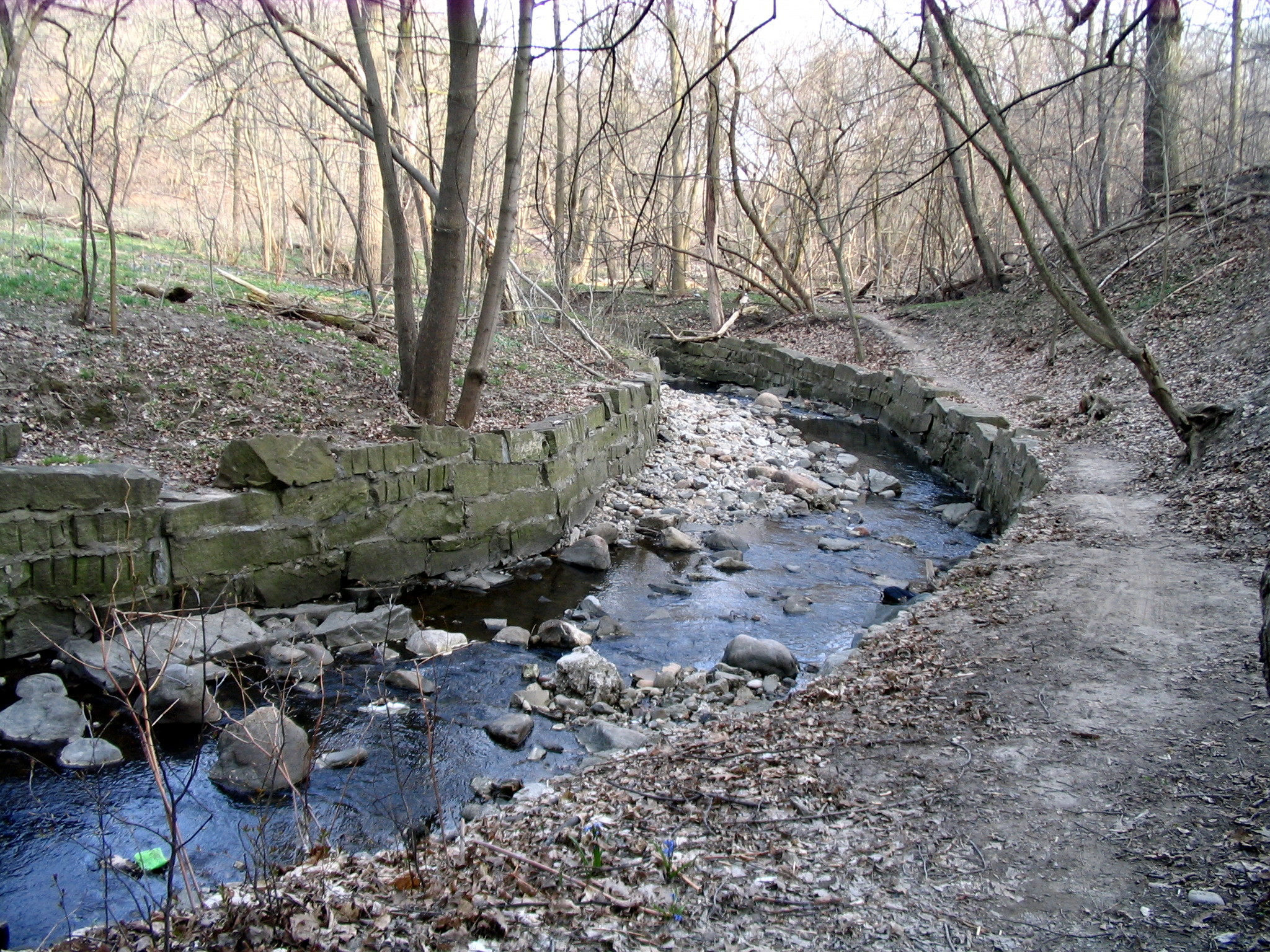
- Yellow Creek as it runs through the Avoca Ravine section of David A. Balfour Park

Location
- Country: Canada
- Province: Ontario
- City: Toronto

Physical characteristics
- Source
  - location: Toronto, Ontario, Canada
- Mouth
  - location: Don River (Ontario), just north of Bloor Street, Toronto, Ontario, Canada
- Length: 12 km (7.5 mi)

Yellow Creek is a partially-buried southeasterly tributary of the Don River in Toronto. It has also been known at different times as Silver Creek, Sylvan Creek, and Rosedale Brook. The former source of Yellow Creek begins near Sheppard West station in the Downsview neighbourhood. Most of the creek and its sources are buried underground in storm sewers until they emerge into Avoca Ravine in the Deer Park neighbourhood and continue their way to the Don River.

== Former reach ==
Much of the former reach of Yellow Creek was buried, starting from its source approximately around Sheppard West station, near Downsview Airport. It followed a southeasterly course from there to just south of Rondale Boulevard. Continuing south-east, it was fed by two small streams, one at Bathurst Heights and another near Briar Hill Avenue.

== Buried sections ==
The modern storm sewer main located near the confluence of the two former streams at Bathurst Heights and near Briar Hill Avenue is a major source of water for Yellow Creek. At this portion, Yellow Creek is effectively a buried and channelled stream which flows south via the storm sewer under Chaplin Crescent, which then follows the path underneath beltline south east. The buried creek crosses Yonge street south of the Davisville railyard into Mount Pleasant Cemetery and is further fed by water from the Yonge street storm sewers before emerging from the southern protrusion of the cemetery into the Vale of Avoca.

== Surface sections ==
The surface sections of the creek start at the Vale of Avoca, a deep ravine located in Deer Park. It surfaces at the southern end of Mount Pleasant Cemetery, flows in a southeasterly course to the Park Drive Reservation Ravine, and then towards the east until it empties into the Don River. The creek is buried twice in the two ravines.

=== Vale of Avoca ===
The surface section of the creek starts when it flows out into a deep ravine known as the Vale of Avoca (also known as the Avoca Ravine), which forms a large portion of David A. Balfour Park. Although the park contains a significant portion of this ravine, its name is occasionally attributed erroneously to both the ravine and the waterway itself. The creek is crossed at this section by the St. Clair Viaduct.

The creek often spills its banks in the ravine during periods of heavy rain due to diversion of water from storm drains and sewers into the ravines, thus over-exceeding the channels' design limits and causing damage to the trails and footbridges in the ravine.

=== Park Drive Reservation Ravine ===
Yellow Creek is again buried underground as it exits the Avoca Ravine, flowing under Mount Pleasant Road into Park Drive Reservation Ravine, then surfacing partway in the latter ravine. It enters the sewers again near Bayview Avenue before joining the Don River.

== Restoration ==
In 2019, The Toronto and Region Conservation Authority identified Yellow Creek as a location which has become a public health concern due to erosion damaging pedestrian paths. Exposed rock retaining walls were removed and replaced with a more gently sloped creek bed which will be less prone to collapse due to erosion. These changes will ultimately allow Yellow Creek to flow without further maintenance and without unnecessary flooding.

== Popular references ==
The events in Margaret Atwood's novel The Blind Assassin begins on the recounting of a car accident at the Vale of Avoca bridge:

Laura had gone through a Danger barrier, then right off the St. Clair Avenue bridge into the ravine far below.

— Margaret Atwood, The Blind Assassin, 2000
