= Denis Dempsey =

Denis Dempsey VC
- Born: 1826; Rathmichael, Bray, County Wicklow
- Died: 10 January 1886 (aged 59-60); Toronto, Ontario, Canada
- Burial place: Saint Michael's Cemetery, Toronto
- Military career
- Allegiance: United Kingdom
- Branch: British Army
- Rank: Private
- Units: 10th Regiment of Foot
- Conflicts: Indian Mutiny
- Awards: Victoria Cross

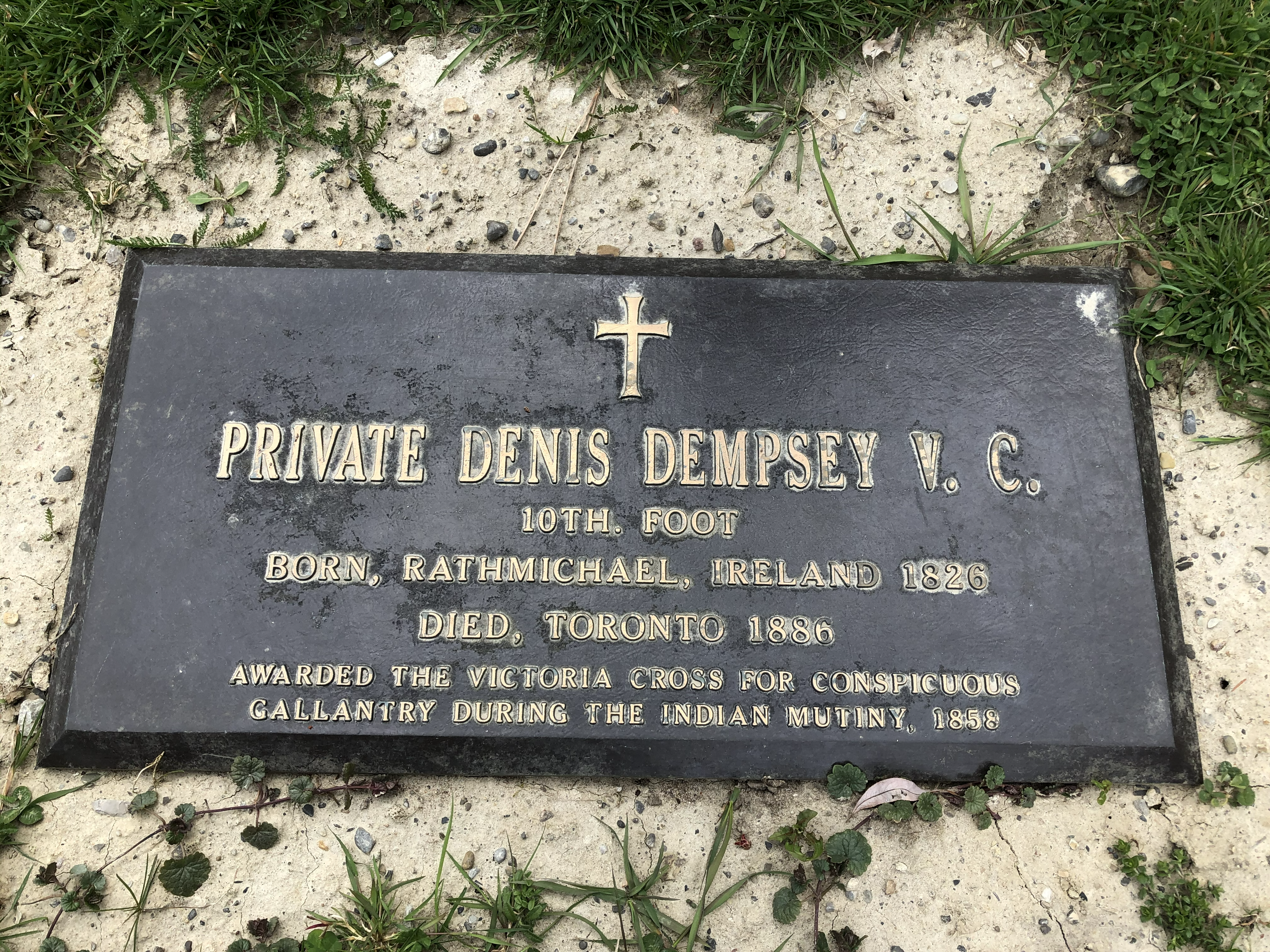
Grave marker for Private Denis Dempsey V.C., in St. Michael's Cemetery, Toronto, Canada

Denis Dempsey VC (1826 – 10 January 1886) was an Irish recipient of the Victoria Cross, the highest and most prestigious award for gallantry in the face of the enemy that can be awarded to British and Commonwealth forces.

== Details ==
He was approximately 31 years old, and a private in the 1st Battalion, 10th Regiment of Foot (later The Lincolnshire Regiment), British Army during the Indian Mutiny when the following deed took place on 12 August 1857 at Lucknow, India for which he was awarded the VC:

10th Regiment (1st Battalion). No. 2134, Private Denis Dempsey

Date of Acts of Bravery, 12th August, 1857, and 14th March, 1858

For having, at Lucknow, on the 14th March, 1858, carried a Powder Bag through a burning village, with great coolness and gallantry, for the purpose of mining a passage in rear of the enemy's position. This he did, exposed to a very heavy fire from the enemy behind loopholed walls, and to an almost still greater danger from the sparks which flew in every direction from the blazing houses. Also, for having been the first man who entered the village of Jugdispore on 12 August 1857, under a most galling fire. Private Dempsey was likewise one of those who helped to carry Ensign Erskine, of the 10th Regiment, in the retreat from Arrah, in July, 1857.

== Further information ==
He later emigrated to Canada and died in Toronto on 10 January 1886. He is buried in Saint Michael's Cemetery, Toronto.
