= Mount Pleasant Road =

Arterial thoroughfare in Toronto, Canada

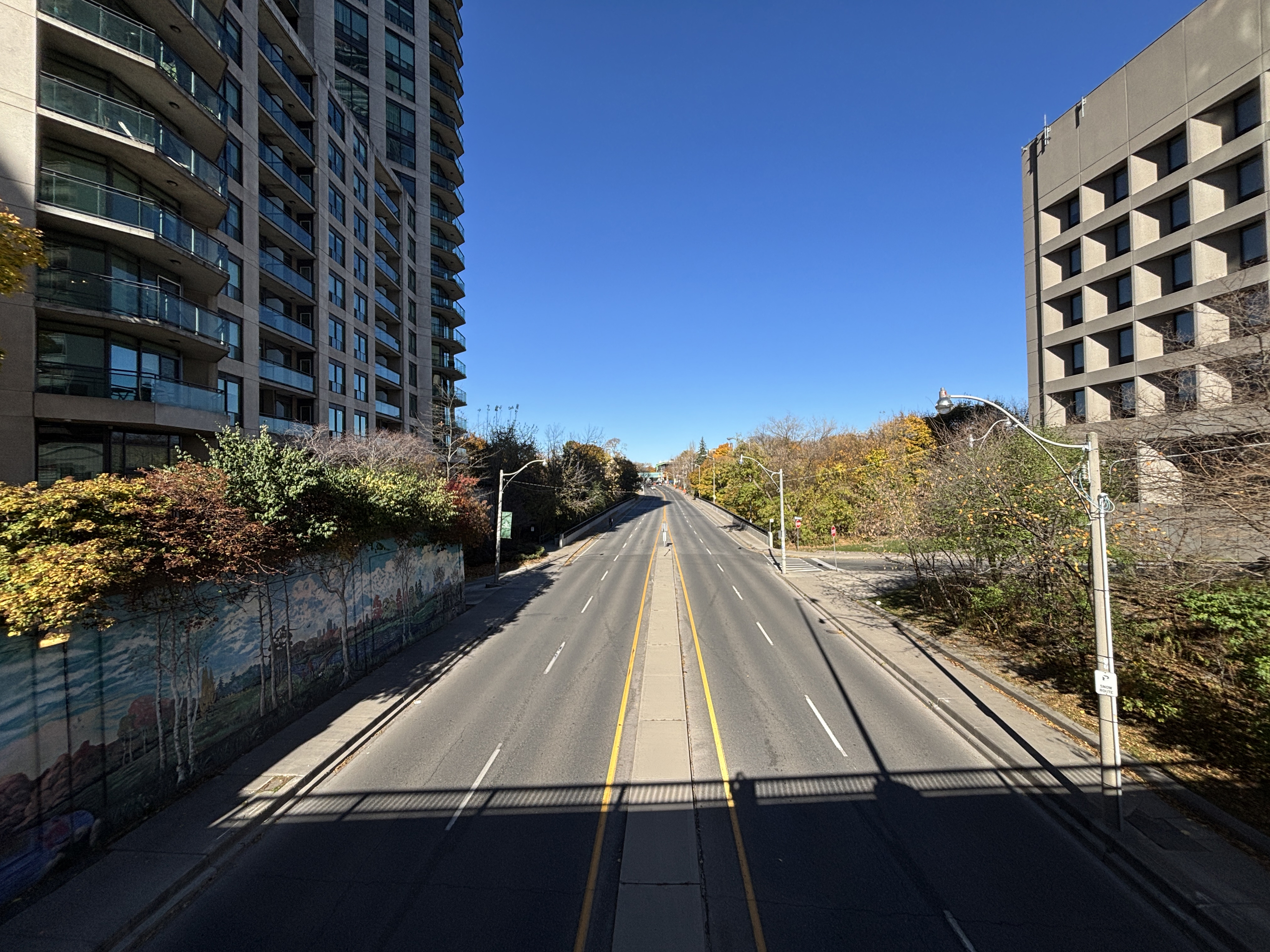
- Mount Pleasant Road, north of Bloor Street

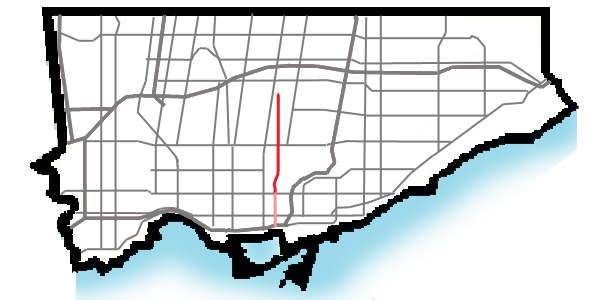
- Map of Mount Pleasant Road, Jarvis Street is in pink
- Type: Toronto
- Maintained by: City of Toronto
- Length: 7.6 km (4.7 mi)
- Location: Toronto
- South end: Jarvis Street / Ted Rogers Way
- Major junctions: Bloor Street East; St. Clair Avenue East; Eglinton Avenue East; Lawrence Avenue East
- North end: Glen Echo Drive

Construction
- Commissioned: 1915

Other
Nearby arterial roads in Toronto
← Yonge Street	Bayview Avenue →

Mount Pleasant Road is a major arterial thoroughfare in Toronto, Ontario, Canada. The street extends from Jarvis Street south of Bloor Street north to Glen Echo Drive. The road is unique as one of the few arterial roads in Toronto to be created after the development of the suburbs which it passes through. These include the wealthy Rosedale, Moore Park and Lawrence Park neighbourhoods. The road also passes through the centre of Mount Pleasant Cemetery, after which it takes its name.

Mount Pleasant Road was first established in 1915 when the city of Toronto, having recently annexed Moore Park, purchased the right-of-way for a new road through the cemetery. This road opened to traffic in 1919, from St. Clair Avenue to the Blythwood Ravine, south of Lawrence Avenue. Several streets were absorbed into the length of Mount Pleasant Road in 1919, 1920 and 1935; the latest as part of a northward extension through Lawrence Park. In the late 1940s, what originally began as the Clifton Road Extension opened a new right-of-way between St. Clair Avenue and Jarvis Street, despite opposition from the Toronto Transit Commission (TTC), bringing the road to its current length of 7.6 km (4.7 mi). This extension is considered Toronto's first expressway.

== Route description ==
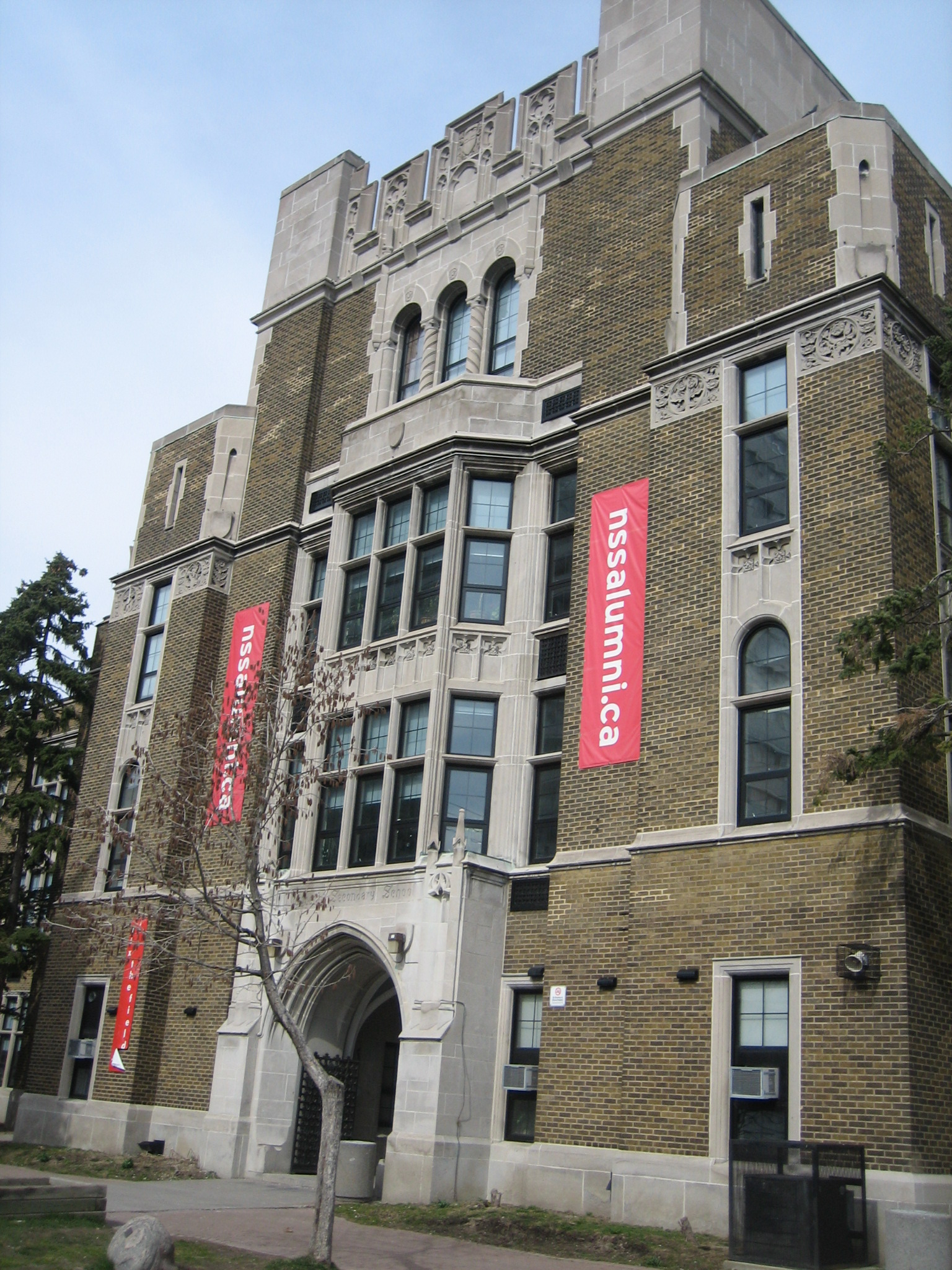
Northern Secondary School lies on the east side of Mount Pleasant Road, north of Eglinton Avenue. It was built prior to the amalgamation of North Toronto.

Between Bloor Street and York Mills Road, Mount Pleasant Road is the first major thoroughfare east of Yonge Street, the centreline of Toronto. It is classified by the city as a "major arterial", with a speed limit of 50 km/h (31 mph) in most places (40 km/h above lawrence). The road is 7.6 km (4.7 mi) in length.

Mount Pleasant begins as an extension of Jarvis Street, in downtown Toronto. Until late 2009, Jarvis extended north to Bloor; however, this section was renamed Ted Rogers Way on October 27, 2009, truncating Jarvis at Mount Pleasant. The road forks to the northeast between large buildings and passes beneath Bloor Street, then crosses the Rosedale Ravine.

It passes through residential South Rosedale, entering a trench and passing beneath Crescent Road. The road descends into Avoca Ravine (crossing Yellow Creek, passing David A. Balfour Park) along the former route of Roxborough Drive, then climbs to pass beneath the Canadian Pacific Railway tracks. It continues to climb along the eastern bank of the ravine, entering Moore Park and turning north at St. Clair Avenue East. Between Crescent Road and Whitehall Road, the route is a limited-access expressway with a Jersey barrier in the median dividing the two opposing directions.

The road passes through the centre of Mount Pleasant Cemetery, after which it takes its name. It crosses the old Belt Line Railway trail, and winds northeast into Davisville Village.

Continuing north and resuming its straight northward course, Mount Pleasant passes through a historic commercial strip, then meets Eglinton Avenue East. It passes into a primarily residential area, though several auto service shops exist along this stretch, as well as Northern Secondary School. The road heads slightly west south of Blythwood Road, then crosses Blythwood Ravine, which contains the small Burke Brook. After climbing into Lawrence Park, the road meets Lawrence Avenue East. This intersection, featuring a multi-stage traffic light, directs drivers to the east before continuing north. From here to the northern terminus, it is classified as a collector road and is a wide residential street with several stop signs. The road ends near the edge of the West Don Valley at an intersection with Glen Echo Drive, adjacent to the Doncliffe Bus Loop.

== History ==
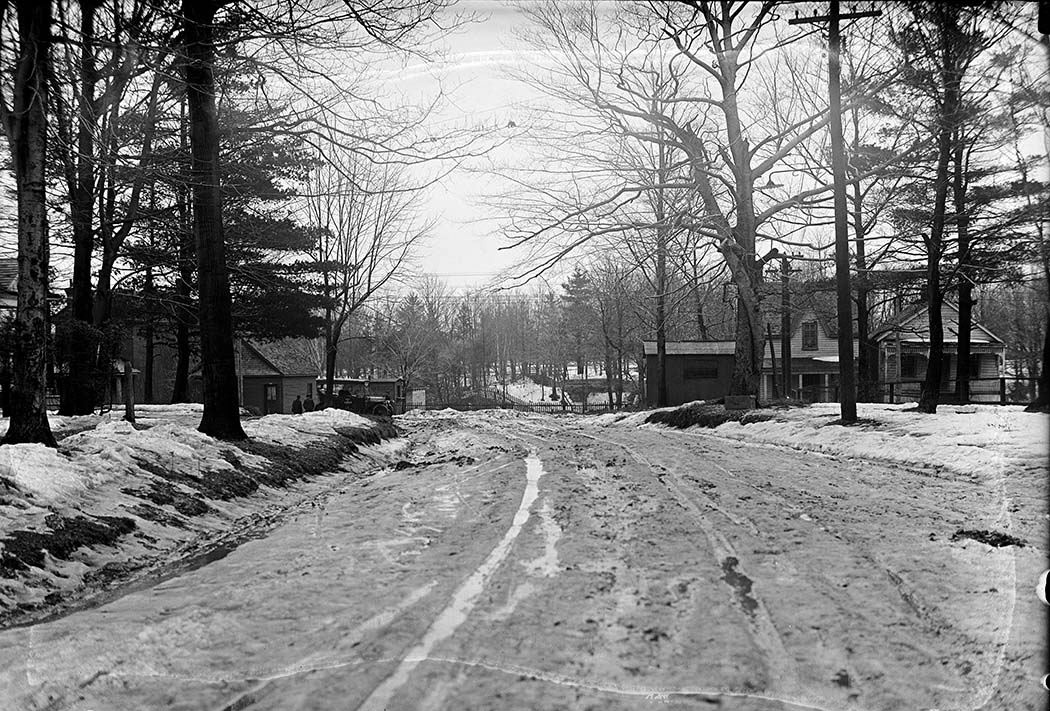
Alberta Avenue was a short muddy street which was incorporated into the alignment of Mount Pleasant Road by 1919

The outward growth of Toronto presented an ever increasing need for a dedicated burial ground. The Toronto General Burying Grounds Trust was formed by the owners of the Potter's Field cemetery, which lay at the northwest corner of Yonge and Bloor. As the cemetery blocked the growth of Yorkville, the village pressured the province to move the interred to a new burial ground; the trust purchased The Necropolis. As Toronto continued to grow, the need for a new cemetery grew. As a result, the trust purchased a 0.81 km^{2} (200 acres) farm north of Deer Park. The new grounds, named Mount Pleasant Cemetery, opened to the public on November 4, 1876. Thereafter, the "outer suburbs" of Rosedale, Deer Park, North Toronto and Moore Park grew, being annexed by the City of Toronto in 1905, 1908 and the latter two in 1912, respectively.

Mount Pleasant Road was constructed over the course of several years by interconnecting several existing streets as well as building a new road in other places; at that time, a road existed to the north and south of the cemetery. The road to the south, running between Clarence Street (renamed Heath Street on April 7, 1913) and Moore Avenue, was known as Lyle Street and Kinsman Avenue. The road to the north, running between Balliol Street and Merton Street, was known as Alberta Avenue.

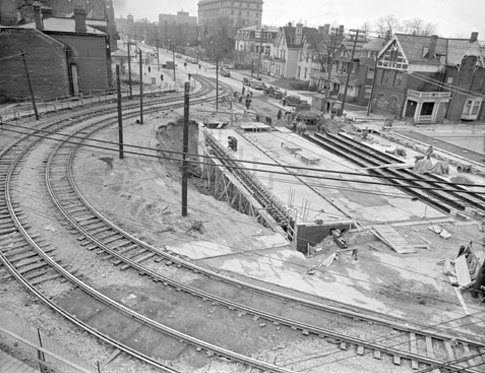
Despite opposition by the TTC, an underpass was constructed at Bloor Street

In an attempt to improve the flow of traffic coming from within the city, the operators of Mount Pleasant Cemetery were approached beginning in 1912 with the goal of opening a new right-of-way through the property. The operators initially refused, prompting the city to pass By-law 7311 in March 1915, which allowed for the expropriation of the cemetery property. Over the next several months, the city and the Toronto General Burying Grounds Trustees bargained over the price of the land, settling for the extraordinary sum of $98,921.88 ($2,090,000, adjusted for inflation) by July; construction began the following spring. The route through Moore Park incorporated a small street known as Kinsman Avenue (known as Lyle Street until April 7, 1913), while north of the cemetery, the short Alberta Avenue between Merton Street And Balliol Street was absorbed. The muddy road was opened to traffic in 1919, featuring a paved bridge with streetcar tracks over the abandoned Belt Line Railway.

By the end of 1919, Mount Pleasant Road existed between St. Clair Avenue and Blythwood Road, ending at the rim of the Blythwood Ravine. Despite this, the road on the opposite rim was renamed from Sidmouth Avenue in 1920. Following the construction of the Vale of Avoca Bridge in the first half of the 1920s, the newly formed Toronto Transit Commission extended the St. Clair streetcar line east to Mount Pleasant Road December 1, 1924 and then north to Eglinton Avenue on November 4, 1925. Between 1934 and 1936, after gaining approval from Lawrence Park developers, a bridge was constructed over the Blythewood ravine and Mount Pleasant extended north to Lawrence Avenue. In 1935, Hilda Avenue was renamed, extending Mount Pleasant Road north to Forest Glen Crescent.

=== Clifton Road Extension ===
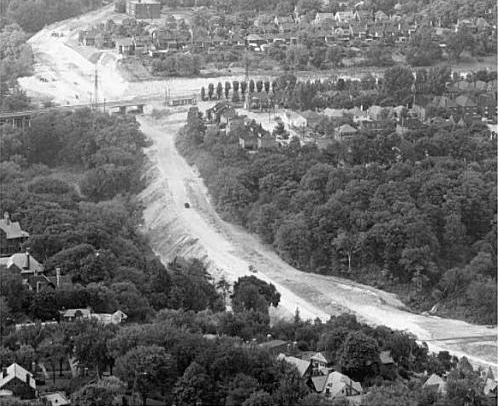
Grading was well underway on the Clifton Road Extension in September 1948

In November 1945, at the recommendation of the planning board, in an effort to improve traffic flow outward from the downtown core, city council initiated what would come to be known as the Clifton Road Extension. Prior to the opening of this route, a road travelled southwest from the intersection of Inglewood Drive and Clifton Road into the ravine, crossed Yellow Creek, and climbed up the opposite slope north to the corner of Avoca Avenue and Rosehill Drive; most of this route exists as a recreational path today. Roxborough Drive also crossed the ravine along the same route as Mount Pleasant today. A third route followed MacLennan Avenue north across the CPR tracks, ascending the steep MacLennan Hill. A decades-old contract signed with CPR required the closing of the MacLennan Avenue crossing if a road should ever pass beneath the tracks.

The Maclennan Hill was a dangerous and steep bottleneck for traffic leaving the inner city. The first recommendations involved creating an underpass beneath the CPR tracks. A vote was held on January 1, 1946, with an overwhelming majority of voters approving the project. After several months of negotiation with residents of South Rosedale, bylaw 16622 formally approved the extension of Clifton Road to Jarvis Street on June 24, 1946.

Residents of Moore Park, opposed to the notion of widening their small residential street, approached city council in September 1948 to request the new extension connect to Mount Pleasant Road instead. A petition of residents followed, and city council accepted the recommendations. Bylaw 17489, passed February 7, 1949, formally approved the project. Despite the loss of ten houses, this plan was carried out.

Construction included a new bridge excavated at the intersection of Huntley and Jarvis Streets, requiring the TTC to divert its streetcar tracks to the south. The closing of the MacLennan Avenue CPR crossing resulted in the construction of a pedestrian overpass. Traffic descending the MacLennan Hill was directed west along a new road to Mount Pleasant. On January 23, 1950, the Clifton Road Extension was renamed Mount Pleasant Road. It opened to traffic on May 17, and is considered the first expressway in Toronto.

== Public transit ==
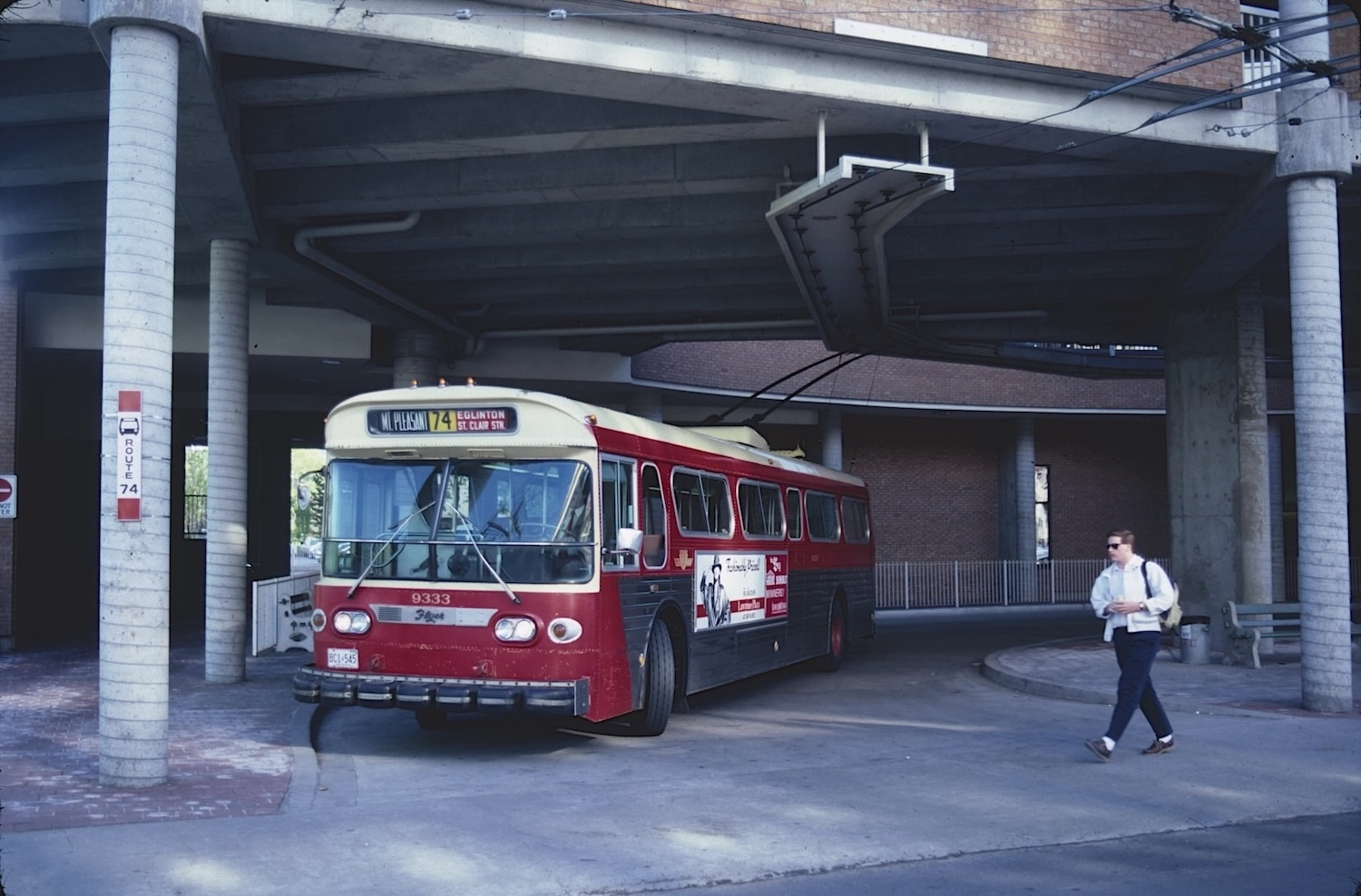
Historically, Mount Pleasant Road was served by trolley buses during two different periods. A route 74–Mt. Pleasant trolley bus is shown in 1987.

Mount Pleasant Road is currently served by TTC route 74 Mount Pleasant from St. Clair Avenue to Doncliffe Drive. Before 2020, the 141 Mount Pleasant Express operated during rush hours for an increased fare, operating from Lawrence to the terminus at Bloor, then continuing along Jarvis to Downtown, though it has been suspended due to COVID-19.

Before 2016, route 74 was split at Eglinton Ave, and would go to Eglinton station, and the 103 Mount Pleasant north would operate north of Eglinton Ave to Doncliffe. However, due to the construction of the Eglinton Crosstown, the 103 was discontinued and the 74 was extended north of Eglinton to Doncliffe. The 74/103 split has since came back eversince the Eglinton Crosstown opened in early 2026.

== Major intersections ==
The following table lists the notable crossroads encountered along Mount Pleasant Road. The entirety of the road lies within the city of Toronto.

Location	km	Destinations	Notes
Cabbagetown	0.0	Jarvis Street, Charles Street East	Mount Pleasant becomes Jarvis Street
Moore Park	2.4	St. Clair Avenue East	St. Clair Avenue becomes a local street east of Mount Pleasant Road
Davisville Village	3.5	Davisville Avenue	
North Toronto	4.5	Eglinton Avenue East	
Lawrence Park	5.6	Blythwood Road	
Lawrence Park	6.5	Lawrence Avenue East	Mount Pleasant Road becomes a collector road north of Lawrence
Lawrence Park	7.6	Glen Echo Road Forest Glen Crescent	Bends into Glen Echo Road
