= Deer Park Junior and Senior Public School =

Coordinates: 43.6896°N 79.3916°W

Location
- Ferndale Avenue; Deer Park, Toronto, Ontario; Canada

Information
- Grades: Kindergarten - Grade 8

Deer Park Junior and Senior Public School is a school in the neighbourhood of Deer Park in Toronto, Ontario, Canada as a member of the Toronto District School Board. From its inception until 1998, it was part of the legacy Toronto Board of Education.

The school serves students from kindergarten to grade eight, acting as an elementary and junior high school. It is on Ferndale Avenue, two blocks east of Yonge Street, just off St. Clair Avenue.

== Programs ==
Deer Park offered the gifted program until 2010, when it was transferred to Forest Hill Collegiate Institute.

In addition to the regular curriculum Deer Park offers an integrated special education program for children with physical disabilities.
