= Canadian Mothercraft Society =

Canadian non-profit organization

The Canadian Mothercraft Society (Mothercraft) is a non-profit, charitable NGO that serves children ages 0 to 6, their families, their teachers, and their community.

== History ==
Mothercraft's history dates back to 1907 when Dr. Truby King introduced "Mothercraft as an Educational Process" as an intervention strategy in New Zealand for the high rate of infant mortality. Dr. King's "Twelve Essentials" (King, 1930) for the raising of healthy infants included:air and sunshine, water, food, clothing, bathing, muscular exercise and sensory stimulation, warmth, regularity, cleanliness, mothering, management, and rest and sleep. Dr. King's "Twelve Essentials" were thought to be revolutionary at the time.

In 1918, Dr. King campaigned on the need for the pre-parenting for parenting and the value of breast-feeding. Dr. King was invited to establish a system of Mothercraft. The underlying message of his program and of the Mothercraft manual was: "Build healthy babies rather than patch sick ones". The Mothercraft system became known as the Mothercraft Movement as it spread to all corners of the British empire, including Australia, England, India, Jamaica, New Zealand, Scotland, and South Africa.

In 1925, His Majesty King George V knighted Dr. King. Over the years, the Royal Family provided support, interest, and encouragement in the activities and accomplishments of Mothercraft.

In 1931, Barbara Mackenzie, a registered nurse and midwife trained in New Zealand came to Canada and married Irving Robertson, then Chairman of the Board of the Hospital for Sick Children in Toronto, Canada. Together, Mr. and Mrs. Robertson established the Canadian Mothercraft Society. Mrs. Robertson championed the cause of midwifery, founded the Mothercraft Well-Baby Nursing Training program, and operated the Mothercraft maternity hospital, and maintained a community registry of Well-Baby Nurses. Well-Baby Nurses aided with breastfeeding, getting infants on schedules, and provided at home child care support. The registry of Well-Baby Nurses was maintained until 1990.

The work of the Canadian Mothercraft Society also attracted the attention of Britain's Royal Family. In 1931, Her Majesty Queen Elizabeth the Queen Mother, as Her Royal Highness the Duchess of York, became the Honorary Patroness of the Canadian Mothercraft Society.

In these early days, the Canadian Mothercraft Society supported infants awaiting adoption with the Catholic Children's Aid Society and provided hospice for infants who were very ill. It was also a time prior to the establishment of Canadian public health systems. To support local efforts at community-based public health, Mothercraft opened advice rooms so that families could bring young children for medical and nutritional advice. Mothercraft also pioneered prenatal classes that focused on infant well-being and mental health.

In the 1960s, Mothercraft's medical focus broadened to include early learning and care and, in 1965, the Canadian Mothercraft Society opened one of the first infant child care centres in Toronto.

In 1967, Mothercraft joined with the Ontario Institute for Studies in Education and conducted research with Dr. William Fowler to determine the effects of quality child care on disadvantaged children. The findings from Dr. Fowler's research provided the foundation for Mothercraft's curriculum in Early Childhood Education. In 1979, Mothercraft again joined research forces with the Ontario Institute for Studies in Education studying early intervention strategies for infant at risk and their families with Dr. Dorothy Shipe. The findings from this research provided a foundation for Mothercraft's early intervention programs.

== Activities ==
As of 2011, The Canadian Mothercraft Society departments include:

- Mothercraft College, home to Mothercraft's diploma program in Early Childhood Education and Research and Evaluation
  - The Mothercraft ECE diploma is a 12-month intensive program of study in the field of Early Childhood Education. The Mothercraft diploma program in Early Childhood Education is an AECEO (Association of Early Childhood Educators, Ontario) Accredited ECE Program.
- Early Intervention, most notably the Breaking the Cycle program (Motz, Leslie, Pepler, Moore & Freeman, 2006; Watson & Leslie, 2005), an early intervention program to support mothers of young children challenged by addictions;
  - Breaking the Cycle's ongoing collaborations in the area of FASD, including work with the Motherisk program, continue to offer research insights into this prevalent form of prenatal brain damage.
- Early Child Development, with three licensed child care centres, a hospital-based play centre at the Princess Margaret Hospital, and the St. Paul's Early Years Centre. Mothercraft's Early Child Development department strives to provide preschool education programs to young children and their families.
