= The Blind Assassin =

2000 novel by Margaret Atwood

- First edition cover
- Author: Margaret Atwood
- Language: English
- Genre: Historical fiction
- Publisher: McClelland and Stewart
- Publication date: September 2, 2000
- Publication place: Canada
- Media type: Print (Hardcover and Paperback)
- Pages: 536pp
- ISBN: 0-385-47572-1
- OCLC: 45202107
- Dewey Decimal: 813/.54 21
- LC Class: PR9199.3.A8 B55 2000c

The Blind Assassin is a novel by the Canadian writer Margaret Atwood. It was first published by McClelland and Stewart in 2000. Set in the fictional Ontario town of Port Ticonderoga and in Toronto, it is narrated from the present day, referring to previous events that span the twentieth century but mostly the 1930s and 1940s. It is a work of historical fiction with the major events of Canadian history forming an important backdrop, for example, the On-to-Ottawa Trek and a 1934 Communist rally at Maple Leaf Gardens. Greater verisimilitude is given by a series of newspaper articles commenting on events and on the novel's characters from a distance.

The work was awarded the Booker Prize in 2000 and the Hammett Prize in 2001 and also received a number of other nominations.

== Plot summary ==
The novel's protagonist, Iris Chase Griffen, and her sister Laura, grow up well-off but motherless in a small town in southern Ontario. As an old woman, Iris recalls the events and relationships of her childhood, youth and middle age, including her unhappy marriage to Toronto businessman Richard Griffen. The book includes a novel within a novel, the eponymous Blind Assassin, a roman à clef attributed to Laura but published by Iris. It is about Alex Thomas, a politically radical author of pulp science fiction who has an ambiguous relationship with the sisters. That embedded story itself contains a third tale, a science fiction story told by Alex's fictional counterpart to the second novel's protagonist, believed to be Laura's fictional counterpart.

The novel takes the form of a gradual revelation illuminating both Iris's youth and her old age before coming to the pivotal events of her and Laura's lives around the time of the Second World War. Laura and Iris live in a house called Avilion. Their mother dies at a young age leaving Reenie, the caretaker, to take on responsibility for the girls. As the novel unfolds, and the novel-within-a-novel becomes ever more obviously inspired by real events, Iris, not Laura, is revealed to be the novel-within-a-novel's true author and protagonist. Though the novel-within-a-novel had long been believed to be inspired by Laura's romance with Alex, it is revealed that The Blind Assassin was written by Iris based on her extramarital affair with Alex. Iris later published the work in Laura's name after Laura committed suicide upon learning of Alex's death in the war.

Following the suicide, Iris realizes through her sister's journals that Richard had been raping Laura for much of their marriage, blackmailing her to comply with him by threatening to turn Alex in to the authorities. Iris takes her young daughter Aimee and flees her home, threatening to reveal that Richard had impregnated Laura and forced an abortion on her. This move estranges Iris from the last people who were supporting her, and creates bitterness between her and the grown Aimee. Iris deceives Richard into believing that Laura was the one having an affair with Alex Thomas, which drives him to commit suicide. The novel ends as Iris dies, leaving the truth to be discovered in her unpublished autobiography that she leaves to her sole surviving granddaughter.

== Reception ==
A reviewer for Salon described the book as a "cunning tale ... sketched with Atwood's trademark dark humor and deft hand." The Christian Science Monitor critic commented on "Atwood's crisp wit and steely realism" and said the book "brilliantly ... works to flesh out the dime-novel culture of the 1930s and to emphasize the precarious position of women." The New York Times critic Thomas Mallon was unimpressed, calling the book "overlong and badly written". Adam Mars-Jones in The Guardian was less negative but characterized the book as a "romantic tale" with political elements bolted on.

The novel was awarded the Booker Prize in 2000 and the Hammett Prize in 2001. It was also nominated for Governor General's Award in 2000, Orange Prize for Fiction, and the International Dublin Literary Award in 2002. Atwood withdrew it from consideration for the 2000 Giller Prize after being named to the jury for the award. Time magazine named it the best novel of 2000 and included it in its list of the 100 greatest English-language novels since 1923. As of 2019, The Blind Assassin is Atwood's second highest-selling novel after The Handmaid's Tale, having sold over half a million copies of hard-cover and paper-back combined. Sales of the novel jumped tenfold in 2000 after receiving the Booker Prize.

== See also ==
- Southern Ontario Gothic
- Fort Ticonderoga
