= St. Michael's Cemetery (Toronto) =

Cemetery in Toronto

Coordinates: 43.686074°N 79.396109°W

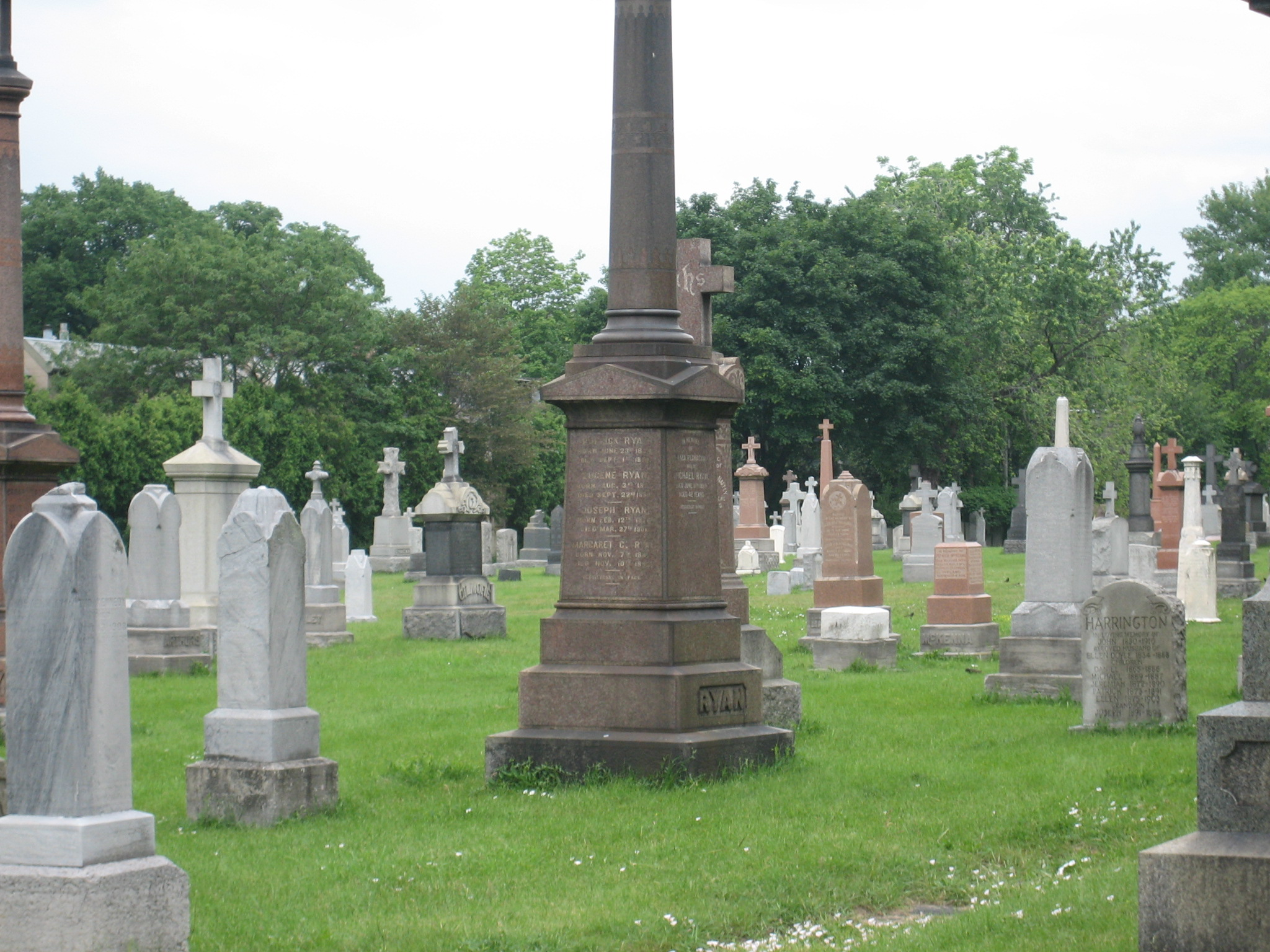
- St. Michael's Cemetery
- Interactive map of St. Michael's Cemetery

Details
- Established: 1855
- Location: Toronto
- Country: Canada
- Type: Catholic (closed)
- Size: 10-acre (40,000 m^{2})
- No. of graves: 29,000
- Find a Grave: St. Michael's Cemetery

St. Michael's Cemetery is a Catholic cemetery in Toronto, Canada. It is located just southwest of Yonge Street and St. Clair Avenue. The 10-acre (40,000 m^{2}) cemetery is invisible from the street, being located in the middle of a city block and ringed by homes and stores. It is accessible only through a small alleyway between two stores on Yonge Street. The gates to the cemetery are normally locked, but are unlocked for visitors between 10am and 4pm on Statutory Holidays, or by arrangement with the Archdiocese of Toronto.

== History ==
The city's oldest surviving Catholic cemetery, it opened in 1855. It replaced St. Paul's Cemetery at Queen and Parliament, which had been filled to capacity by the recent influx of Irish Catholic settlers. Some 29,000 people are buried at St. Michael's. It is the final resting place mostly for working-class Irish Canadians. St. Michael's remained the only Catholic cemetery in Toronto until 1900 when it was near capacity, and the Mount Hope Cemetery was opened.

One of the most notable features of the cemetery is the octagonal mortuary vault designed by Joseph Sheard, who later became mayor of Toronto.

== Notable interments ==
Some notable figures are interred there including brewer Eugene O'Keefe and Victoria Cross recipient Denis Dempsey.

The cemetery contains the graves of seven Canadian servicemen of World War I, which are registered by the Commonwealth War Graves Commission.
