= St. Clair Avenue =

Road in Toronto, Ontario, Canada

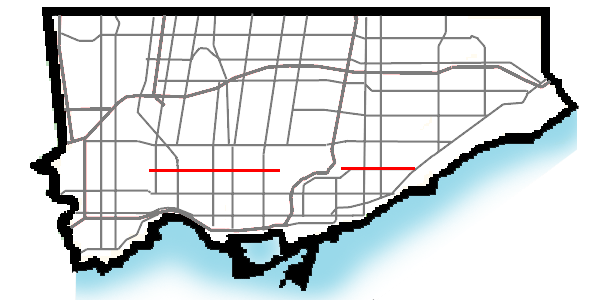
- Maintained by: City of Toronto
- Length: 17 km (11 mi)
- Location: Toronto, Ontario, Canada
- West end: Scarlett Road
- Major junctions: Jane Street; Keele Street / Weston Road; Dufferin Street; Bathurst Street; Avenue Road; Yonge Street; Mount Pleasant Road —Road Breaks— Woodbine Heights Drive; O'Connor Drive; Danforth Road
- East end: Kingston Road

Other
Nearby arterial roads in Toronto
← Dundas Street; Davenport Road; Danforth Avenue; Danforth Road; Kingston Road	Eglinton Avenue; O'Connor Drive; Danforth Road →

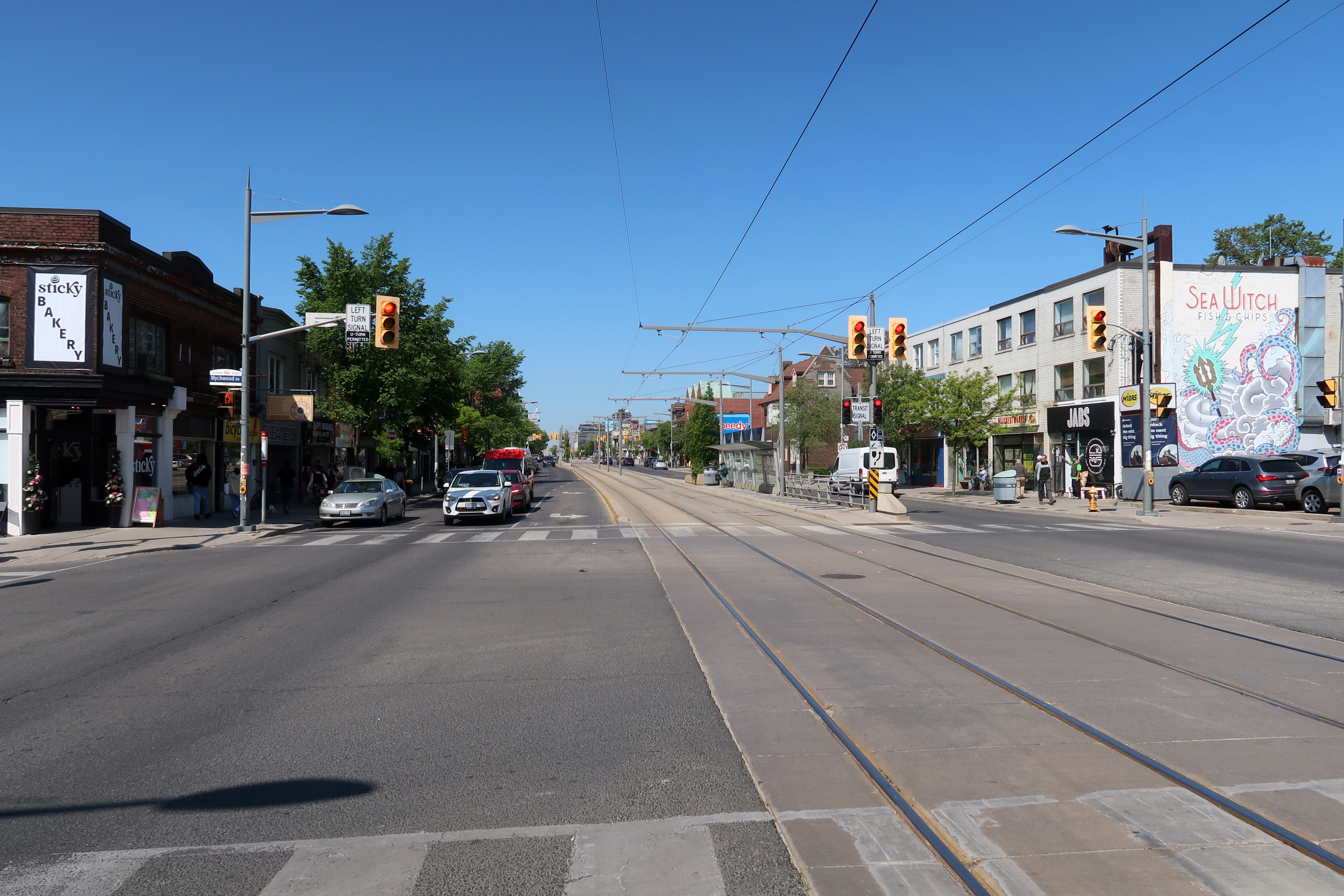
Looking west on St. Clair Avenue West in Wychwood with the completed streetcar right-of-way in centre

St. Clair Avenue is a major east–west street in Toronto, Ontario, Canada. It was laid out in the late 18th century by the British as a concession road (the Third Concession), 2 kilometres (1.2 mi) north of Bloor Street and 4 kilometres (2.5 mi) north of Queen Street.

St. Clair Avenue has two sections. The western section extends from Moore Park in the east to Scarlett Road in the west, a distance of approximately 10 kilometres (6.2 mi). An eastern section picks up on the far side of the Don Valley at Taylor Creek Park, extending for 7 kilometres (4.3 mi) to Kingston Road. Like all streets in Toronto which cross Yonge Street, St. Clair is divided into separate East and West sections, each with its own street numbers beginning at Yonge Street. Unlike most other concession-road streets in Toronto, St. Clair does not extend west into Etobicoke, due to the northern arc of Dundas Street crossing the Humber River near its western terminus, forming a link to Burnhamthorpe Road, its approximate equivalent arterial.

St. Clair Avenue West has heavy automotive and public transit traffic. Over half the commuters in rush hour traffic travel by the 512 St. Clair streetcar line which connects with St. Clair subway station on Line 1 Yonge–University and St. Clair West station also on the Line 1 Yonge-University subway. The eastern section of St. Clair Avenue East is serviced by the 8 Broadview and 102 Markham Road bus routes.

== Name ==
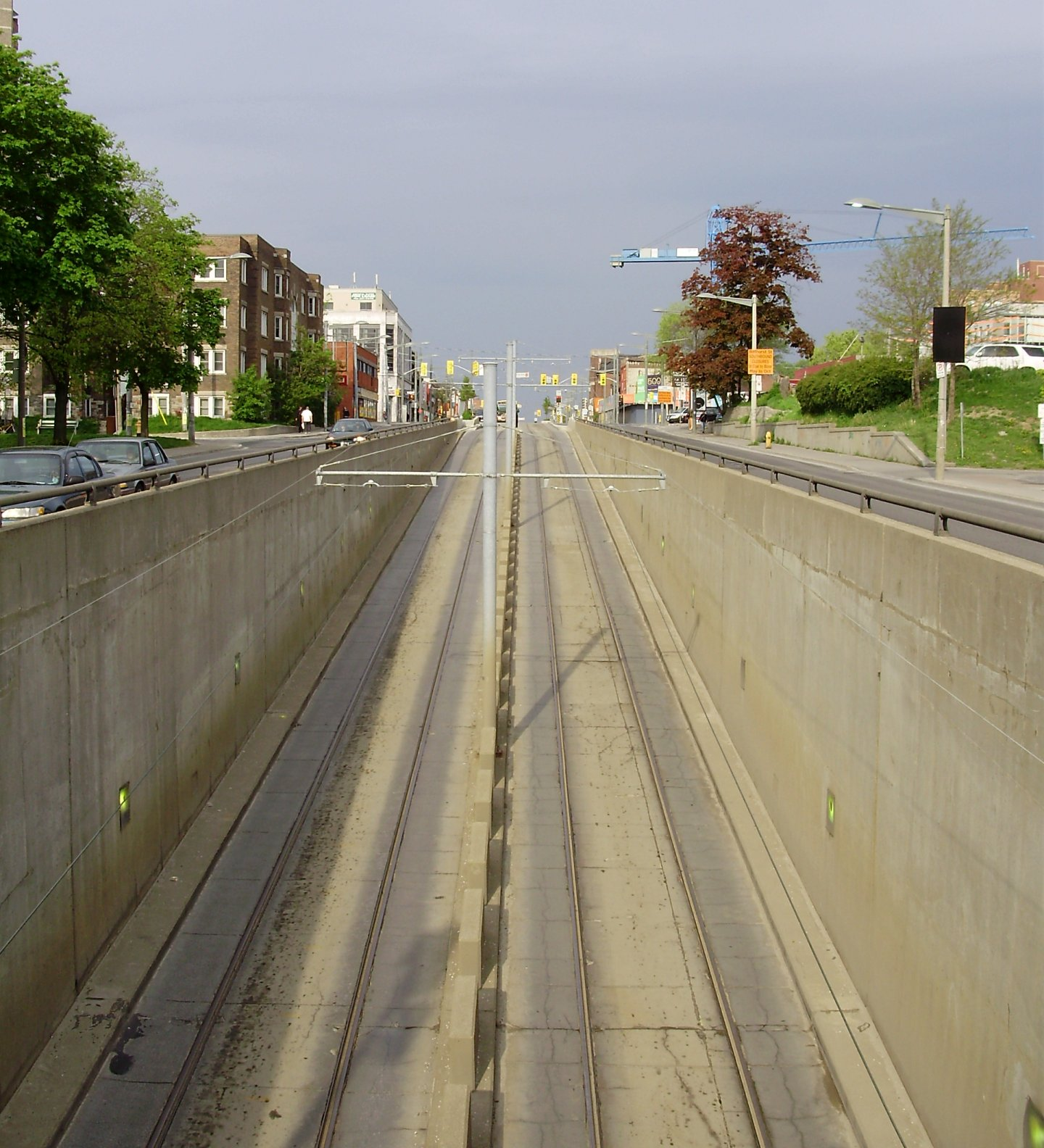
The centre lanes of St. Clair Avenue West carry streetcars underground to and from St. Clair West Station.

St. Clair Avenue takes its name from Augustine St. Clare, a character from the novel Uncle Tom's Cabin. The Grainger family, who rented a farm near the present-day intersection of Avenue Road and St. Clair, had viewed a stage production of Uncle Tom's Cabin. Two members of the family, Albert and Edwin, adopted names of two characters as their middle names as each boy had no given middle name. Edwin added Norton to his name, and Albert chose St. Clare, although he used the incorrect spelling of St. Clair, as it was used in the theatre program. (Lake St. Clair and the St. Clair River use the same spelling, though they are named for the actual Saint Clare of Assisi, on whose feast day they were encountered by Sieur de La Salle.) As a joke, Edwin and Albert made street signs using their names and posted them at Yonge and St. Clair. The St. Clair sign survived for a while and the name became adopted as the name for the 3rd Concession Road. The first known printed use of the St. Clair name was in an 1878 publication, Illustrated Historical Atlas of the County of York.

In 1913, a Roman Catholic church was built in the Earlscourt District, and named after the actual Saint Clare. St. Clare's Church is at 1118 St. Clair Avenue West, on the north side of the street, east of Dufferin. The parish opened the St. Clare's Catholic School, an elementary school, next door in 1910.

== History ==
The first settlement on St. Clair was at Yonge Street, where the Heath family bought land in 1837. A thriving neighbourhood, Deer Park, was established by the 1850s. The next settlement was about 5.5 km (3.4 mi) west, at Old Weston Road (then Weston Road), where settlement of Carlton Village began in the late 1840s. The western end of St. Clair experienced substantial development, with the municipalities of West Toronto, Earlscourt, Dovercourt, and Oakwood established there.

These municipalities were annexed by Toronto between 1908 and 1911, and the western section of St. Clair Avenue became entirely managed by the City of Toronto. To stimulate development along what was then largely a rural road, the city's Toronto Civic Railways built a streetcar line from Yonge Street to Caledonia Road by 1912. This included the construction of a bridge across Nordheimer Ravine (after an earth berm collapsed) as well as what was termed the Lauder Fill: the burying of the western branch of Garrison Creek, the final section to be routed into the city's stormwater system.

The growth of the inner suburbs of Leaside, Rosedale and Moore Park prompted the city of Toronto to approach the operators of Mount Pleasant Cemetery in 1912 with the goal of extending the short Mount Pleasant Road south through the cemetery to connect with St. Clair. Though the operators initially refused, they later accepted the city's offer of $100,000 ($2,095,000, adjusted for inflation) in 1915. The muddy road was opened to traffic in 1918. The construction of the Vale of Avoca through the first half of the 1920s prompted the new Toronto Transit Commission to extend the St. Clair streetcar line east to Mount Pleasant Road and then north to Eglinton Avenue.

From 1937 to 1952, St. Clair West formed part of provincial Highway 5A, providing an alternate route between Islington and Yonge Street that avoided the congestion of Bloor Street. By 1952, St. Clair was developed enough that it no longer served a provincial role; a new Toronto Bypass road under construction between Weston and Highway 11 would instead serve to divert highway traffic off local surface streets.

Much of the development from this era survives. St. Clair West is one of many streets in Toronto which has experienced little development since an initial building boom. The exception is the intersection with Yonge Street, which has experienced heavy nodal development since the opening of the St. Clair subway station there in 1954. The buildings there include the world headquarters of George Weston Foods Inc. St. Clair now intersects with two more subway stations, Warden Station in the east and St. Clair West Station near Bathurst Street, as well as Scarborough GO Station.

=== Streetcar Right-of-Way Project ===
The Toronto Transit Commission decided to upgrade the St. Clair streetcar to a dedicated right-of-way to increase service reliability when the streetcar tracks were approaching the end of their lifespan in the early 2000s. In October 2006, construction started on the right-of-way in the centre of St. Clair. St. Clair Avenue was one of the few streets in Toronto wide enough to accommodate a dedicated right-of-way without significantly reducing the width of traffic lanes.

Looking east on St. Clair Avenue West, near Lansdowne in 2004, before the right-of-way project.

The project was important for St. Clair West not only for the transit upgrades, but because it involved a near-total reconstruction of the street. Water mains were replaced. Overhead wires along the side of street and large wooden poles holding them up were phased out in favour of buried utilities, leaving only the single electric wires for streetcars. Unique poles and white streetlights were installed, coordinated in design with the new designer transit shelters. Trees were added, as well as ornamental pedestrian lighting along certain stretches, with the most extravagant in terms of design being in Corso Italia. The thorough redesign and reconstruction of the street was extended even to the streetcar loops. The streetcar right-of-way project upgraded the aesthetics of the public realm dramatically, though sidewalks had to be narrowed in places to accommodate the right-of-way and two lanes of traffic in each direction. The traffic lanes themselves were narrowed slightly.

== Neighbourhoods ==
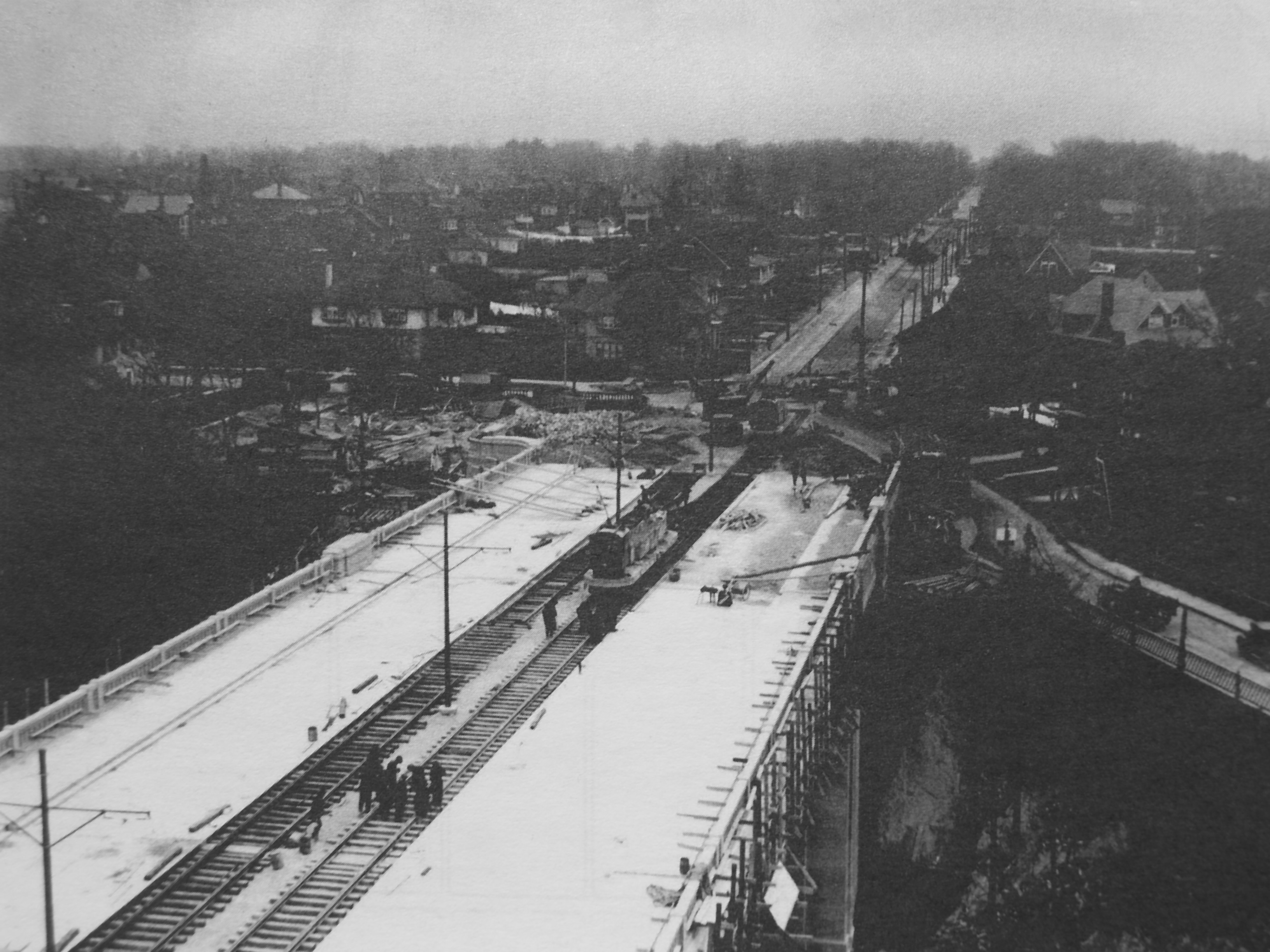
The Vale of Avoca, east of Yonge Street, nearing completion in 1924

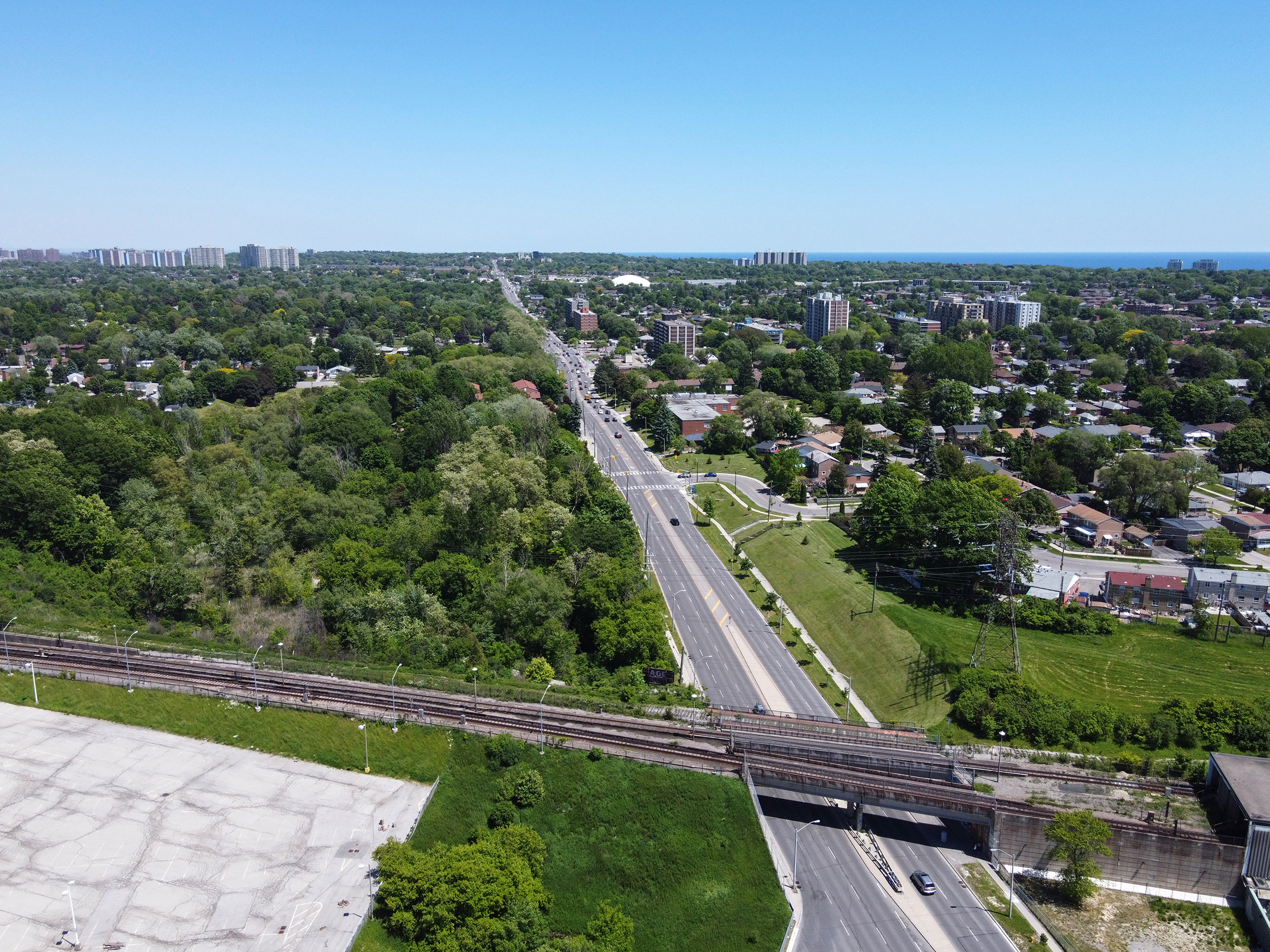
St Clair Ave East near Warden Avenue

From east to west, the main section of St. Clair passes through several prominent neighbourhoods starting with Moore Park and Deer Park. West of Avenue Road are Forest Hill, the South Hill, Hillcrest, Wychwood, Oakwood, Earlscourt (including Corso Italia), and The Junction. The eastern section of St. Clair passes eastward starting in Parkview Hills, through Woodbine Gardens, Clairlea, Birchmount Park, and Kennedy Park to Cliffcrest.

St. Clair Avenue is well known for the high population of Portuguese, Latin American and Italian people. St. Clair is usually where the Italian and Portuguese soccer fans celebrate after a game their nations won. Over the years, the Italian and Portuguese people throughout Toronto have established a rivalry in soccer against each other. One of the largest celebrations on St. Clair Avenue was when Italy won the 1982 FIFA World Cup, which involved an estimated 300,000 fans, shutting the street down for nearly 20 blocks between Caledonia and Oakwood.

Corso Italia, Toronto's other Italian enclave, is found on St. Clair Avenue West, between Westmount Avenue (just east of Dufferin Street) and Lansdowne Avenue. St. Clair West is also used as an umbrella term to refer to all neighbourhoods from Old Weston Road to Bathurst as they share a similar building style. Although the area has been historically referenced as predominantly Italian, it is no longer populated by any one majority. Many new homebuyers looking to purchase in the city are choosing St. Clair West for its relatively modest home prices, the pride of ownership apparent throughout its neighbourhoods, and the new St. Clair Ave. TTC streetcar right-of-way.

St. Clair Avenue holds Toronto's biggest celebration of salsa Latino culture. The two-day street festival attracts an estimate of 250,000–500,000 people, the majority of them being from Latinos living in Toronto and all over Ontario come together to dance, eat, shop and celebrate the culture of Latin America. The festival is always held in July on the week, which it has been traditionally recognized as Latino Week in Toronto, in honour of the festival.

== Landmarks ==
- Dawes Road Cemetery
- Deer Park United Church
- First Unitarian Congregation of Toronto
- Holy Rosary Catholic Church, at 354 St. Clair Ave. West
- Imperial Oil Building
- Loring-Wyle Parkette at St. Clair and Mount Pleasant
- Providence Healthcare
- R. H. King Academy
- Timothy Eaton Memorial Church, at 230 St. Clair Avenue West
- Wittington Tower

== In culture and media ==
"A Bus Along St. Clair: December" is the last poem of The Journals of Susanna Moodie (1970), a book of poems by Margaret Atwood.

"Jane St. Clair", in the Barenaked Ladies' song "Jane", is named for the intersection of Jane Street and St. Clair Avenue.
