= List of United Church of Canada churches in Toronto =

This is a list of United Church of Canada churches in Toronto, Ontario. In its early history, the city was an overwhelmingly Protestant community, and was a centre of Methodism. The Presbyterian Church also had a very strong presence. When the two denominations merged, Toronto was at the forefront of the formation of what became the United Church. Although there were once over one hundred and fifty congregations in the city of Toronto, today there are seventy active United Church congregations.

The Toronto Conference is one of the 13 conferences that the United Church is divided into. This conference covers much of south central Ontario, including all of the city of Toronto as well as the surrounding counties. The city itself is divided into two presbyteries:

- Toronto Southeast, covering eastern North York, East York, the old city of Scarborough, Ontario and eastern areas of the old city of Toronto;
- South West, covering Etobicoke, York, the western parts of North York and old Toronto. South West also extends into Malton, Brampton and Halton Hills.

== Active congregations ==
| Congregation | Location | Year Founded | Notes | Image |
|---|---|---|---|---|
| Alderwood United Church | Alderwood | 1955 | | |
| Asbury & West United Church | Lawrence Manor | 1947 | Formed by the merger of Asbury Methodist Church (1812) and West Presbyterian Church (1860; which had become a United Church in 1925). Both congregations were originally located in the downtown core. | |
| Bathurst Street United Church | Harbord Village | 1860 | Congregation currently meets at Trinity-St. Paul's United Church. Founded as Bathurst Street Wesleyan Methodist Church, former church building now the Randolph Theatre. | |
| Beach United Church | The Beaches | 2007 | Formed from the merger of Bellefair United Church and Kew Beach United Church; now meeting in former Kew Beach building. | |
| Birchcliff Bluffs United Church | Birchcliff | 2004 | Founded in 1919 as Birchcliff Congregationalist; new church formed from merger with Birchcliff United Church. | |
| Bloor Street United Church | The Annex | 1887 | Founded as a Presbyterian church, joined the United Church in 1924. Although the congregation is active, the church building was partially demolished and undergoing redevelopment as of 2025. | |
| Central United Church | Weston | 1821 | Founded as a Methodist church, joined the United Church of Canada in 1925. | |
| Chapel in the Park United Church | Thorncliffe Park | 2022 | Formed from the merger of Don Mills United Church and Thorncliffe Park United Church. | |
| College Street United Church | Palmerston-Little Italy | 1874 | Founded as College Street Presbyterian Church, joined the United Church in 1925. In 1990 much of the original church building was demolished and is now a condominium building, with space for the congregation. | |
| Cummer Avenue United Church | Newtonbrook | 2013 | Formed from the merger of Northminster United and Newtonbrook United. Bayview United Church merged into it in 2023. | |
| Davenport Perth United Church | Carleton Village | 1818 | Originally Davenport Road Methodist Church, then Olde Davenport United Church, merged with Perth United in 1970. | |
| Deer Park United Church | Deer Park | 1881 | Founded as a Presbyterian church, joined the United Church in 1925. Due to structural issues with its original church building, since 2010 the congregation has met at Calvin Presbyterian Church. | |
| Dentonia Park United Church | The Danforth | 1924 | Since 2012 the congregation has met at Hope United Church. | |
| Deutsche Evangeliums United Church | Davisville | 1957 | Principally serves the German speaking community. Congregation meets at Glebe Road United Church. | |
| Donway Covenant United Church | Don Mills | 1954 | In 1992 Covenant United Church-Oriole merged into it. | |
| Downsview United Church | Downsview | 1844 | Founded originally as a Methodist church, joined the United Church in 1925. Built in 1870, and is a Toronto Heritage Property. | |
| East End United Church | The Danforth | 2018 | Formed from the merger of Glen Rhodes United Church, Cosburn United Church, and Eastminster United Church. | |
| Eglinton St. George's United Church | Lytton Park | 1890 | Originally founded as a Presbyterian church, joined the United Church in 1925. | |
| Fairbank United Church | Glen Park | 1844 | Originally founded as a Methodist church. St. Cuthbert's United Church merged into it in 2001. | |
| Fairlawn Avenue United Church | Bedford Park | 1915 | Originally founded as Fairlawn Methodist. Several other congregations have merged into Fairlawn (Armour Heights in 1989 and St. James-Bond in 2005) | |
| Forest Hill United Church | Forest Hill | 1940 | | |
| Ghana Calvary Methodist United Church | Downsview | 2011 | Congregation is of the Methodist Church Ghana, but remains affiliated with the United Church of Canada. Church building was formerly the Beverley Hills United Church. | |
| Glebe Road United Church | Davisville | 1925 | Church also hosts the Deutsche Evangeliums United Church congregation and Grace Toronto Japanese Church (Presbyterian Church in America). | |
| Glen Ayr United Church | Bendale | 1960 | | |
| Hope United Church | The Danforth | 1880 | Originally founded as Hope Methodist, joined the United Church in 1925. | |
| Humber Valley United Church | Humber Valley | 1952 | | |
| Humbercrest United Church | Baby Point | 1912 | Originally founded as a Methodist church, joined the United Church in 1925. | |
| Humbervale United Church | Etobicoke | 1893 | Originally founded as a Methodist church, joined the United Church in 1925. | |
| Hungarian United Church | Corso Italia | 1924 | Principally serves the Hungarian community. | |
| Islington United Church | Islington | 1843 | Originally founded as a Methodist church, with the original building being on Dundas Street West. Congregation moved to Burnhamthope Road in the 1950s. | |
| Jane-Finch Community Ministry | Jane and Finch | 1982 | | |
| Jubilee United Church | Don Mills | 1835 | Originally founded as York Mills Presbyterian. Since its founding several congregations have merged into it. | |
| Kimbourne Park United Church | The Danforth | 1913 | Originally founded as Greenwood Avenue Presbyterian Church. Church moved to current location in the 1930s | |
| Kingston Road United Church | The Beaches | 1927 | Founded as a United Church through the merger of several Presbyterian and Methodist missions in North Beaches. | |
| Kingsway-Lambton United Church | The Kingsway | 1845 | Originally founded as Lambton Mills Methodist, joining the United Church in 1925. It was originally located at Lambton Mills on Dundas Street, moving to The Kingsway in 1936. | |
| Knob Hill United Church | Bendale | 1955 | | |
| Knox United Church | Scarborough | 1844 | Originally founded through York Mills Presbyterian Church, it joined the United Church in 1925. | |
| Lansing United Church | Lansing | 1918 | Originally founded as a Methodist church, joined the United Church in 1925. | |
| Lawrence Park Community Church | Lawrence Park | 1950 | | |
| Leaside United Church | Leaside | 1930 | | |
| Manor Road United Church | Davisville | 1925 | | |
| Martin Grove United Church | Rexdale | 1994 | Formed from the merger of West Humber United Church and Rexdale United. | |
| Metropolitan United Church | Garden District | 1818 | One of the largest and most prominent churches in the United Church of Canada, once known as the "Cathedral of Methodism." Originally founded as Methodist church, joined the United Church in 1925. | |
| North Runnymede United Church | Rockcliffe–Smythe | 1913 | Originally founded as Scarlett Plains Methodist Church. | |
| Northlea United Church | Leaside | 1955 | | |
| Onnuri Korean United Church | Bedford Park | | Congregation meets in the former Armour Heights United Church building. | |
| Parkdale United Church | Parkdale | 1876 | Originally founded as Parkdale Methodist Church. Original church building was demolished in 1980 and is now occupied by an apartment building. | |
| Parkwoods United Church | Don Mills | 1960 | | |
| Regent Park United Church | Regent Park | 1940s | Original church building demolished in the 2000s. | |
| Richview United Church | Centennial Park | 1829 | Originally founded as Richview Methodist Church. Original building demolished during the construction of the 427-401-Richview Expressway complex; congregation moved into new subdivision; cemetery remains in highway median. | |
| Roncesvalles United Church | Roncesvalles | 1969 | Formed from the merger of Emmanuel United Church and Howard Park United Church. Congregation was originally known as Emmanuel-Howard Park United, but renamed to Roncesvalles United Church in 2016. | |
| Royal York Road United Church | Etobicoke | 1889 | Founded originally as Tomlinson Methodist Church. | |
| Rosedale United Church | Rosedale | 1868 | Originally founded as Northern Congregational Church. Moved to Rosedale in 1914, was renamed Rosedale Union Church 1922. Joined the United Church in 1925. | |
| Runnymede United Church | Bloor West Village | 1925 | Originally founded by Presbyterians from Victoria Presbyterian Church. | |
| Scarborough Bluffs United Church | Scarborough Bluffs | 2004 | Formed from the merger of Washington United Church and Cliffcrest United Church. | |
| St. Andrew's United Church | Church and Wellesley | 1830 | Originally founded as a parish of the Church of Scotland, split from St. Andrew's Presbyterian Church in 1925 at the founding of the United Church of Canada, absorbing several Presbyterian and Methodist congregations in the process. | |
| St. James United Church | Etobicoke | 1951 | | |
| Saint Luke's United Church | Cabbagetown | 1959 | Formed by the merger of Carlton Street United Church and Sherbourne Street United Church. Congregation meets in the former Sherbourne Street United building. | |
| St. Mark's United Church | Woburn | 1965 | Original building destroyed by fire in 1970s, later rebuilt. | |
| St. Matthew's United Church | Humewood-Cedarvale | 1966 | Formed from the merger of St. Columba United Church and St. Clair United Church. Several other congregations have been absorbed since. | |
| St. Paul's United Church Scarborough | Cliffside | 1920 | Originally founded as Scarborough Bluffs Presbyterian Church. | |
| St. Paul's Lakeshore United Church | Long Branch | 1924 | | |
| Timothy Eaton Memorial United Church | Forest Hill | 1914 | Originally founded as Timothy Eaton Memorial Methodist Church. | |
| Toronto Chinese United Church | L'Amoreaux | 1918 | Originally founded as a Methodist church on Chestnut Street in Chinatown. Moved to present Scarborough location by 1988. | |
| Trinity-St. Paul's United Church | The Annex | 1889 | Originally founded as Trinity Methodist Church, and then Trinity United Church in 1925. St. Paul's-Avenue Road United Church merged into it in 1980. | |
| Wesley Mimico United Church | Mimico | 1925 | Formed from the merger of Wesley Methodist Church and Mimico Presbyterian Church. | |
| West Hill United Church | West Hill | 1947 | | |
| Westway United Church | Etobicoke | 1957 | | |
| Wexford Heights United Church | Wexford | 1842 | Originally founded as Zion Methodist Church, Wexford. Joined Presbyterian Church in 1888 following dissatisfaction with Methodist union and closing of congregation. Joined United Church in 1925. | |
| Willowdale United Church | Willowdale | 1815 | Founded as Willowdale Methodist Church. Originally at Yonge and Church, but moved to Willowdale when Yonge widened in 1953. Presently principally serves the Korean community. | |

== Former churches ==
| Congregation | Location | Dates | Notes | Image |
|---|---|---|---|---|
| Alhambra Avenue United Church | Roncesvalles | 1909-1970 | Merged to form High Park-Alhambra United Church. Originally founded as Alhambra Avenue Presbyterian Church, joined the United Church in 1925. Former church building now a Lithuanian cultural centre. | |
| Armour Heights United Church | Ledbury Park | 1947-1989 | Merged into Fairlawn Heights United Church. Former building now Onnuri Korean United Church. | |
| Avenue Road United Church | Summerhill | 1899–1930 | Merged with St. Paul's-Avenue Road United Church, the building became an evangelical church in 1941, with Charles Templeton as pastor, and has been the Toronto Hare Krishna Temple since 1976. | |
| Bayview United Church | York Mills | 2014-2023 | Merged with Cummer Avenue United Church. Formed from the merger of Centennial-Japanese and Oriole-York Mills United Church. Former church now Christ Embassy Church. | |
| Bellefair United Church | The Beaches | 1907-2007 | Merged with Kew Beach United Church, building now integrated into a shopping centre and condominium. | |
| Bedford Park United Church | Bedford Park | 1922-2013 | Closed. Founded as Bedford Park Presbyterian Church, joined with the United Church in 1925. Former church location now home to Ranleigh Park. | |
| Berkeley Street United Church | Moss Park | 1871–1955 | Merged with Regent Park United Church. Founded as Berkeley Street Wesleyan Methodist Church. Former church building is now an event venue. | |
| Beverley Hills United Church | Downsview | 1954-2011 | Closed and re-established as the Ghana Calvary Methodist United Church. | |
| Birchcliff United Church | Birchcliff | 1951-2003 | Merged into Birchcliff Bluffs United Church. Founded in 1925 as Birchcliff Union Congregational Church, joined the United Church in 1951. | |
| Bloordale United Church | Etobicoke | 1958-2024 | Merged into Islington United Church. | |
| Carlton Street United Church | Garden District | 1832–1959 | Merged to form St. Luke's United Church. Founded as a Methodist church, originally located on Bay Street and then Alice Street before moving to Carlton Street. | |
| Centennial Methodist United Church | Dufferin Grove | 1891-1986 | Merged to form Centennial-Japanese United Church. Founded as Dovercourt Methodist Church, later renamed to Centennial Methodist Church. Joined the United Church in 1925. Former church building now condominiums. | |
| Centennial-Japanese United Church | York Mills | 1986-2014 | Merged with Oriole-York Mills United Church to form Bayview United Church. Originally formed from the merger of Centennial Methodist United Church and Toronto Japanese Church. | |
| Centennial-Rouge United Church | West Hill | 1919-2011 | Closed. Originally Centennial United Church, Scarborough. Rouge Hill United Church, Pickering merged into it in 1971. | |
| Chalmers United Church | Mount Dennis | 1913-1960 | Merged to form Mount Dennis United Church. Originally founded as Mount Dennis Presbyterian Church, the building of which was used by the succeeding congregation. | |
| Church of the Master United Church | Woburn | 1958-2017 | Closed. | |
| Cliffcrest United Church | Scarborough | 1948-2004 | Merged to form Scarborough Bluffs United Church. | |
| Clinton Street United Church | Little Italy | 1896–1928 | Merged with West United Church in 1928, which later became Asbury & West United Church. Former building later the home of Dewi Sant Welsh United Church. | |
| Cosburn United Church | East York | 1933-2018 | Merged to form East End United. | |
| Covenant United Church-Oriole | Henry Farm | ?-1992 | Merged to form Donway Covenant United Church. | |
| Dewi Sant Welsh United Church | Bedford Park | 1907-2022 | Merged into Timothy Eaton Memorial Church. Was formerly the only Welsh language congregation in Canada. | |
| Don Mills-Thorncliffe Park United Church | East York | 1819-2022 | Merged to form Chapel in the Park United Church. Founded originally as a Methodist church, joined the United Church in 1925. | |
| Dufferin United Church | Davenport | 1890-1961 | Merged into Oakwood United Church. Originally founded as Dufferin Methodist Church. | |
| Eastminster United Church | The Danforth | 1925-2018 | Merged to form East End United. Originally founded as a Methodist church, joined the United Church in 1925 as Danforth United. North Broadview United merged with it in 1966 and name was changed to Eastminster United Church. Building now home to East End United Church. | |
| Earlscourt United Church | Earlscourt | 1905–1969 | Merged to form Faith United Church. Originally founded as Boon Avenue Methodist Mission, joined the United Church in 1925. | |
| Eglinton United Church | Yonge and Eglinton | 1840–1999 | Merged into Eglinton St. George's United Church. Originally founded as a Methodist church, joined the United Church in 1925. | |
| Elia United Church | Elia | 1900–1957 | Closed. Former building now a Reformed Church. | |
| Elverston United Church | Amesbury | ?-1971 | Merged to form Elverston-Trethewey United Church. | |
| Elverston-Trethewey United Church | Amesbury | 1971-2001 | Closed. Formed from the merger of Elverston Park United Church and Trethewey United Church. | |
| Emery United Church | Weston | 1960-1970 | Merged to form Riverside-Emery United Church. | |
| Emmanuel United Church | Roncesvalles | 1961-1969 | Merged to form Emmanuel-Howard Park United Church. | |
| Epworth United Church | Seaton Village | 1888-1981 | Merged into St. Matthew's United Church. Founded originally as Epworth Methodist Church. | |
| Erskine United Church | Roncesvalles | 1884–1961 | Merged to form Emmanuel United (later Emmanuel-Howard Park United and then Roncesvalles United). Originally founded as Fern Avenue Presbyterian, later called High Park Presbyterian. Joined the United Church in 1925. | |
| Faith United Church | Earlscourt | 1969–1992 | Closed and merged into St. Matthew's United Church. Originally formed by the merger of Earlscourt United and St. David's United. Building sold to Bethlehem United Church of Christ (Apostolic), which was later demolished 1995. | |
| Forest Grove United Church | Willowdale | 1959-2024 | Merged into Jubilee United Church. | |
| Gerrard Street United Church | Cabbagetown | 1880–1939 | Merged with St. Enoch's United Church. Founded originally as a Methodist church. Former building now a Serbian Orthodox Church. | |
| Glenmount United Church | Upper Beaches | 1909-1984 | Merged to form Glen Rhodes. Originally a Methodist church, joined the United Church in 1925. | |
| Glen Rhodes United Church | Leslieville | 1984-2018 | Merged to form East End United. Originally formed from a merger of Rhodes Avenue United Church and Glenmount United Church. | |
| Grace-Carmen United Church | Little Portugal | ?-1983 | Merged to form Wesley-Grace-Carmen United Church. Former church building now home to Toronto Bethel Community Church. | |
| High Park-Alhambra United Church | High Park North | 1970-1996 | Formed from the merger of High Park Avenue United Church and Alhambra Avenue United Church. | |
| High Park Avenue United Church | High Park North | 1925-1970 | Merged to form High Park-Alhambra United Church. Originally founded as High Park Avenue Methodist Church. | |
| High Park Korean United Church | High Park North | 1996-2011 | Closed. Building was former home of High Park-Alhambra United Church. | |
| Howard Park United Church | Roncesvalles | 1908-1969 | Merged with Emmanuel United to form Emmanuel-Howard Park United (now Roncesvalles United). Originally founded as Howard Park Methodist. | |
| Iondale Heights United Church | Ionview | 1954-2013 | Closed. | |
| Kew Beach United Church | The Beaches | 1890–2007 | Merged into Beach United Church. Originally founded as Kew Beach Presbyterian, joining the United Church in 1925. Former building is now home to Beach United Church. | |
| Malvern Emmanuel United Church | Malvern | 1864-1969; 1973-2020 | Closed. Originally founded as a Methodist church, the first church to serve the village of Malvern. Joined the United Church in 1925. Congregation disbanded in 1969, but in 1973 the congregation reorganized, but later disbanded again in 2020. | |
| Mount Dennis United Church | Mount Dennis | 1960-2011 | Closed. Originally formed from the merger of Chalmers United Church and Pearen Memorial United Church. After its formation several other congregations had merged into it including Harwood Presbyterian; St. Luke's United York Township; and Prospect Park United. Former building now Iglesia ni Cristo. | |
| Newtonbrook United Church | Willowdale | 1850s-2012 | Merged to form Cummer Avenue United Church. Originally founded as a Methodist church, joined the United Church in 1925. | |
| North Broadview United Church | Riverdale | 1889-1966 | Merged to form Eastminster United Church. Founded as Chester Presbyterian Church. | |
| North Riverdale United Church | Riverdale | 1925–1929 | Met in Harcourt Hall, as minority from Riverdale Presbyterian (including Minister) who supported 1925 Union. Not being able to acquire building, joined with North Broadview, Danforth, Donlands, Riverdale, and other congregations. | |
| Northminster United Church | Willowdale | 1956-2013 | Merged to form Cummer Avenue United Church. Originally located near Finch and Bathurst. | |
| North Parkdale United | Roncesvalles | 1889–1961 | Merged with Erskine United to form Emmanuel United, (later Emmanuel-Howard Park United and then Roncesvalles United). | |
| Oakwood United Church | Humewood-Cedarvale | ?-1986 | Merged into St. Matthew's United Church. Former building now home to New Dawn Moravian Church. | |
| Oriole-York Mills United Church | York Mills | 1840s-2014 | Merged with Centennial-Japanese United Church to form Bayview United Church. Originally founded as a Methodist church. | |
| Pearen Memorial United Church | Mount Dennis | 1903-1960 | Merged to form Mount Dennis United Church. Originally founded as Mount Dennis Methodist Church. | |
| Perth United Church | Junction Triangle | 1889-1970 | Merged to form Davenport-Perth United Church. Founded originally as Ernest Avenue Methodist Church. Original building later a Seventh-Day Adventist church. | |
| Presteign Woodbine United Church | Parkview Hills | 1918-2015 | Merged into Leaside United Church. Originally founded as Gledhill (later Woodbine) Methodist Church. | |
| Prospect Park United | Earlscourt | ?-1970 | Merged to into Mount Dennis United Church. | |
| Queensway United Church | Etobicoke | 1923-1970 | Merged into Royal York Road United Church. Originally founded as Etobicoke Methodist Church. Former building is now The Little Campus School. | |
| Rexdale United Church | Rexdale | 1956-1994 | Merged to form Martin Grove United Church. | |
| Rhodes Avenue United Church | Leslieville | 1906-1984 | Merged with Glenmount United to form Glen Rhodes United Church. Originally a Presbyterian church, joined the United Church in 1925. | |
| Riverdale United Church | Riverdale | 1862-2010 | Closed. Originally founded as Riverdale Methodist Church. Original church building was demolished in 2018. | |
| Riverside United Church | Weston | 1938-1960 | Merged to form Riverside-Emery United Church. | |
| Riverside-Emery United Church | Weston | 1970-2014 | Closed. Originally formed from the merger of Emery United Church and Riverside United Church. | |
| Sherbourne Street United Church | Cabbagetown | 1872–1959 | Merged to form St. Luke's United Church. Founded originally as Sherbourne Street Methodist Church. Former church building home to St. Luke's United Church. | |
| Silverthorn United Church | Silverthorn | 1914–1995 | Merged into Mount Dennis United Church. Founded originally as Silverthorn Methodist Church. | |
| Simpson Avenue United Church | Leslieville | 1889–1991 | Merged with Glen Rhodes United Church. Founded as a Methodist church. Former church building now home to Metropolitan Community Church of Toronto | |
| St. Clair United Church | Humewood-Cedarvale | 1878-1966 | Merged to form St. Matthew's United Church. Originally founded as Zion Methodist Church, and then St. Clair United Church. Former building now home to successor congregation. | |
| St. Columba United Church | Humewood-Cedarvale | 1890-1966 | Merged to form St. Matthew's United Church. Originally founded as St. Columba Presbyterian Church. Former building now home to St. Alphonsus Roman Catholic Church. | |
| St. Cuthbert United Church | Fairbank | 1925-2001 | Closed and merged into Fairbank United Church. Former building now a British Methodist Episcopal Church. | |
| St. David's United Church | Earlscourt | 1906–1969 | Merged with Earlscourt United to form Faith United. Originally founded as Westminster (late St. David's) Presbyterian church, joined the United Church in 1925. Former church building later acquired by Seventh Day Adventist congregation. | |
| St. Enoch's United Church | Cabbagetown | 1885–1970 | Closed. Originally founded as St. Enoch's Presbyterian Church. Former church building is now the Winchester Street Theatre. | |
| St. James-Bond Church | North Toronto | 1928–2005 | Merged into Fairlawn Avenue United Church. Originally founded by two downtown congregations (Bond Congregationalist (1830s) and St. James Square United Presbyterian (1853)). Former church building demolished in 2007. | |
| St. John's United Church | Agincourt | 1955-2010 | Closed. | |
| St. Luke's United Yorktownship | Silverthorn | ?-1943 | Merged to into Silverthorn United Church. Originally founded as a Presbyterian church. | |
| St. Luke's United Church, Etobicoke | Etobicoke | 1955–2010 | Closed. | |
| St. Paul's-Avenue Road United Church | Yorkville | 1877–1980 | Merged to form Trinity-St. Paul's United Church. Former church building destroyed by fire in 1995. | |
| Thorncliffe Park United Church | Thorncliffe Park | 1962-2022 | Merged to form Chapel in the Park United Church. Former church building used by the successor congregation. | |
| Toronto Japanese Church | Downtown | 1946-1986 | Merged with Centennial Methodist United Church to form Centennial-Japanese United Church. | |
| Trethewey Park United Church | Amesbury | 1926-1971 | Merged to form Elverston-Trethewey United Church. | |
| Victoria Park United Church | Clairlea | 1917-2018 | Closed. Originally founded as Dawes Road Methodist Church. Relocated in 1949 from East York to Scarborough. | |
| Wanstead United Church | Oakridge | 1923-2012 | Merged with St. Paul's United Church Scarborough. Originally founded as Warden Park Presbyterian Mission. | |
| Washington United Church | Scarborough Bluffs | 1803-2004 | Merged to form Scarborough Bluffs United Church. Founded originally as Scarborough Methodist Church. Former building now home to the succeeding congregation. Church cemetery located near Scarborough Golf Club. | |
| Wesley United Church | Trinity-Bellwoods | 1876–1983 | Merged to with Grace-Carmen United Church form Wesley-Grace-Carmen United Church. Originally founded as Wesley Methodist Church. | |
| Wesley-Grace-Carmen United Church | Trinity-Bellwoods | 1983–1988 | Merged with Westmoreland United Church to form Westennial United Church. | |
| West Ellesmere United Church | Maryvale | 1956-2018 | Closed. Major split in 1980 led to Good Shepherd Community Church in L'Amoreaux Community. | |
| West United Church | Alexandra Park | 1860-1947. | Merged to form Asbury & West United Church. Founded as West Presbyterian Church, first church building now St. Stanislaus Kostka Roman Catholic Church. | |
| West Humber United Church | Etobicoke | ?-1994 | Merged to form Martin Grove United Church. | |
| Westennial United Church | Trinity-Bellwoods | 1988–1997 | Closed. Originally formed by the merger of Wesley-Grace-Carmen and Westmoreland United. Former church building is now West Neighbourhood House. | |
| Westminster-Central United Church | Yorkville | 1925–1950 | Merged into St. Andrew's United Church. Originally formed in 1925 by merger of Westminster Presbyterian and Central Methodist. | |
| Westminster United Church | Weston | 1847-2013 | Closed. Founded originally as Weston Presbyterian (Free Church). Moved into new building near Weston and Lawrence; Old Church split in 1914. Constructed new building east of Railway in 1950s. | |
| Westmoreland United Church | Dovercourt | 1884–1988 | Merged with Wesley-Grace-Carmen to form Westennial United Church. | |
| Wilmar Heights United Church | Wexford | 1957–2002 | Closed and merged into Wexford Heights United Church. | |
| Wilson Heights United Church | Clanton Park | 1952-1968 | Merged into Armour Heights United Church. | |
| Windermere United Church | Swansea | 1911-2023 | Merged with Runnymede United Church. Former church building is still owned as a satellite campus of the congregation. | |
| Woodgreen United Church | Leslieville | 1875–2004 | Closed. Originally founded as Woodgreen Tabernacle, joined the United Church in 1925. | |

== See also ==
- List of Anglican churches in Toronto
- List of Orthodox churches in Toronto
- List of Presbyterian churches in Toronto
- List of Roman Catholic churches in Toronto
- List of Synagogues in Toronto
