= St. James-Bond Church =

Coordinates: 43.705759°N 79.410202°W

St. James-Bond United Church
- St. James-Bond United Church
- Location: 1066 Avenue Road; Toronto, Ontario, Canada
- Denomination: United Church of Canada

Architecture
- Style: Tudor Revival
- Years built: Late 1920s
- Demolished: 2006

St. James-Bond United Church, at 1066 Avenue Road in Toronto, Ontario, was a United Church of Canada congregation from 1928 to 2005, when it merged with Fairlawn Heights United Church (now Fairlawn Avenue United Church) in the Yonge Street and Lawrence Avenue area. The "St. James-Bond" name derived from the merger of St. James Square Presbyterian Church with Bond Street Congregational Church in 1928. Prior to the merger, they were separate congregations downtown, of the Presbyterian and Congregational traditions respectively.

The church building at 1066 Avenue Road was vacated on February 28, 2006. The building was torn down in the summer of 2006, and the site is now the Living Life on the Avenue Seniors Retirement Residence.

The building had been used by Elections Canada for a polling place. In 2008, some voters were mistakenly told to vote at the demolished church, instead of at the new polling place at Marshall McLuhan Catholic Secondary School.

== Bond Street Congregational Church ==
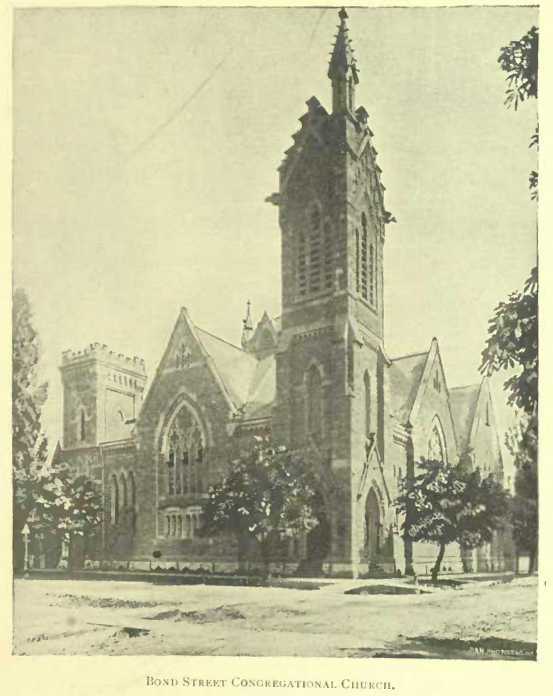
Bond Street Congregational Church

Originally located east of Yonge Street on Dundas Street, the congregation moved uptown in 1927, to a growing suburban development north of Eglinton Avenue. The Bond Street building was acquired by a pentecostal church, Evangel Temple. The building was destroyed by fire after Evangel Temple moved to the Hoggs Hollow area, near Yonge and York Mills, on September 19, 1981.

== St. James Square Presbyterian Church ==
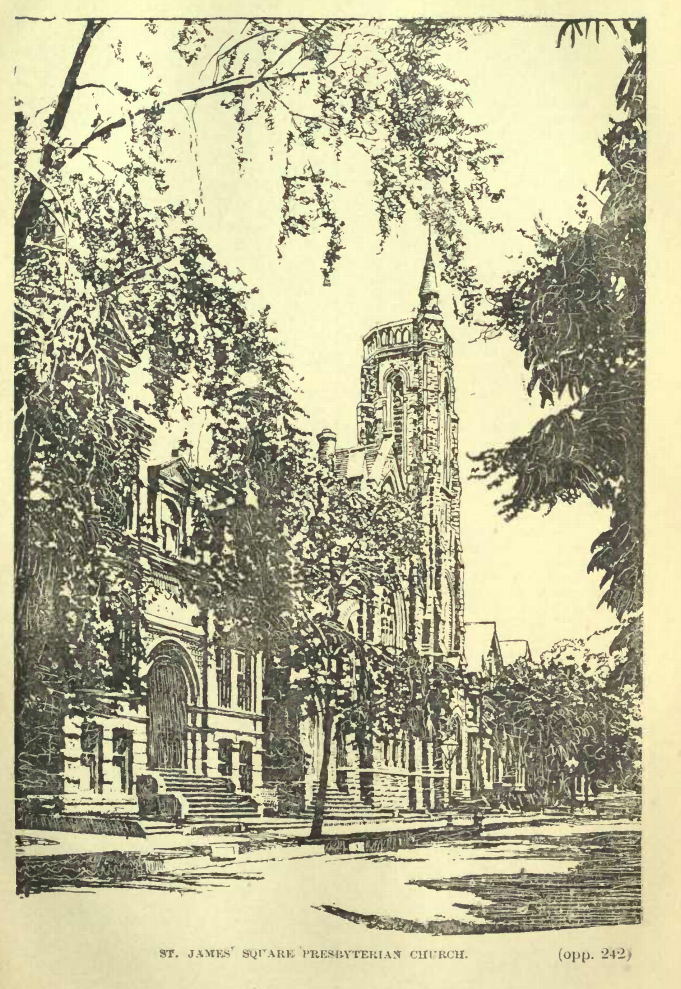
St. James Square Presbyterian Church

Located on Gerrard Street, just east of Yonge, on the present site of Toronto Metropolitan University's St. James Square Campus, this was the third building of the Second United Presbyterian Church of Toronto. It was built in 1879, replacing a much smaller building at southeast corner of Gould and Victoria Streets (now Ryerson Community Park) that had been built by architect William Hay in 1855–1856.

The United Presbyterian Church's Canadian synod approved the division of their Toronto, Canada West Bay Street United Presbyterian Church congregation in 1853 to assist in the move of their Divinity Hall from London to Toronto. In 1861, the merger of the UPC with the Free Church saw the Divinity School merge with Knox College, and Gould Street Church grew under the leadership of:

- Professor John Taylor (1853–1861), who returned to Scotland; his son, Sir Thomas Wardlaw Taylor remained in Canada, and was later Chief Justice of Manitoba.
- Rev. Robert Burns (1861–1863), a Knox College professor, formerly of Knox Free Church,
- John Mark King (1863–1883), later the Principal of Manitoba College in Winnipeg,
- S. H. Kellogg (1885–1892), a former missionary to India), who returned there,
- Louis Jordan (1894–1900),
- Alfred Gandier (1901–1908), later Principal of both Knox (1909–1925) and Emmanuel College (1925–1932).
- Andrew Robertson (1910–1916),
- D. N. Morden (1917–1926).

== St. James-Bond United Church ==
Both congregations joined the United Church of Canada in 1925. Each had declined as Toronto grew and parishioners joined congregations closer to their homes, some started by the respective congregations.

St. James Square was the "parent" of College Street United Church and St. John's Presbyterian Church, Toronto. Bond Street was the parent of Birchcliff Church in Scarborough Township (now Birchcliff Bluffs United Church). Bond Street was the first of the two congregations to move into a new area, joined by their former downtown neighbour a year later.

Ian Fleming apparently stayed with a friend on Avenue Road across from the church, and he later went on to write books about a character named James Bond. Fleming, however, always claimed the name was chosen from a book on birds called Birds of the West Indies written by ornithologist, James Bond.

== See also ==
- List of United Church of Canada churches in Toronto
