= Imperial Oil Building =

Skyscraper in Toronto, Canada

Imperial Plaza
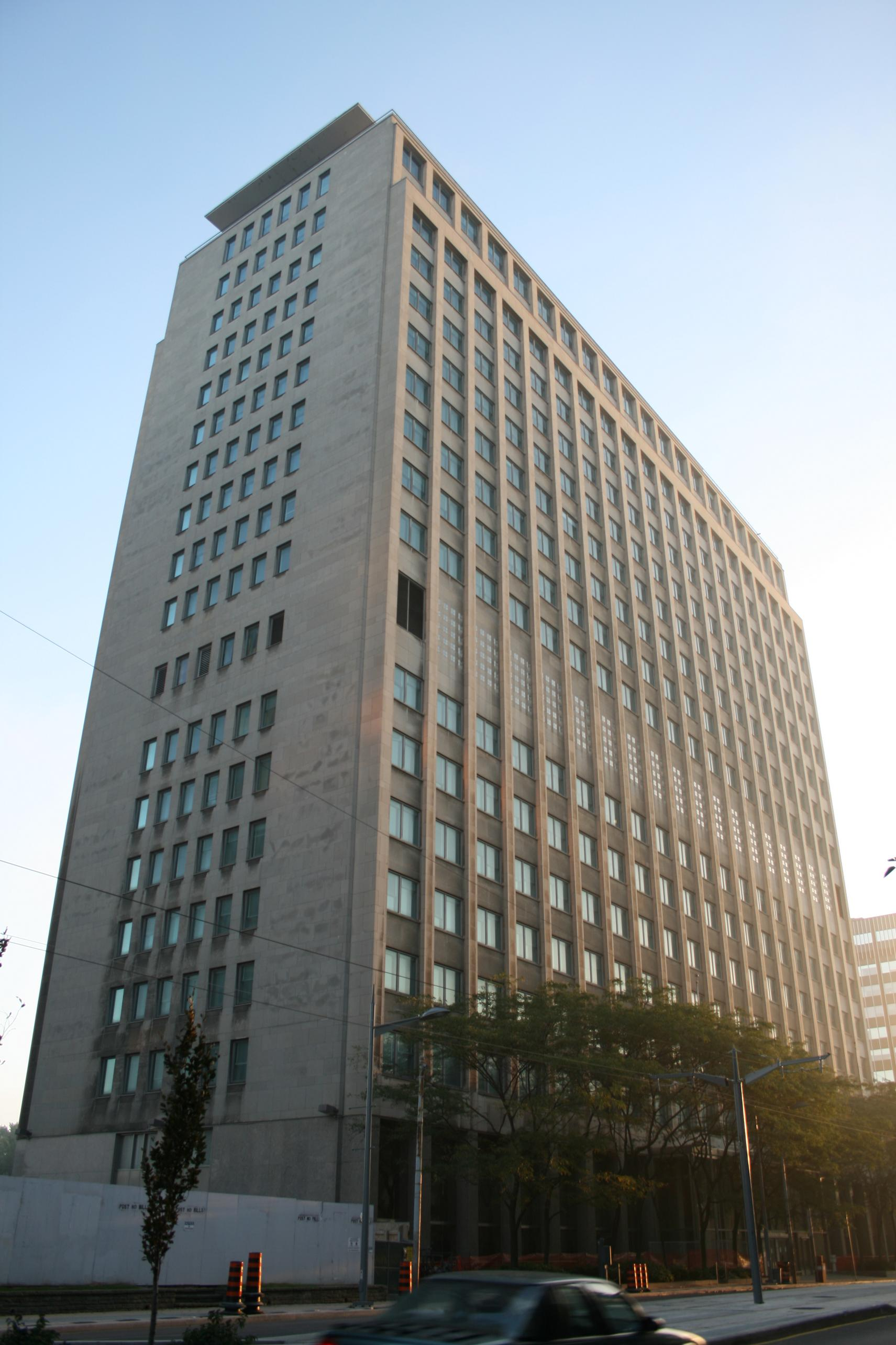
- View of the building in 2007
- Interactive map of the Imperial Plaza area
- Former names: Imperial Oil Building

General information
- Architectural style: Modernist
- Location: 111 St. Clair Avenue West, Toronto, Canada
- Coordinates: 43.686448°N 79.399502°W
- Completed: 1957
- Client: Imperial Oil

Technical details
- Floor count: 21

Design and construction
- Architect: Alvan Mathers
- Architecture firm: Mathers and Haldenby

Renovating team
- Architect: Onespace Unlimited Inc.

The Imperial Oil Building, now known as Imperial Plaza, is a skyscraper located at 111 St. Clair Avenue West in Toronto, Ontario, Canada. The 21-storey building was completed in 1957 as the headquarters of Imperial Oil, Canada's largest oil company. The building's design had previously been rejected for a proposed new Toronto City Hall. After several decades of use as the head office of Imperial Oil, the building was sold in 2010 and converted into a condominium apartment building.

== Description ==
The building sits atop a high escarpment with a commanding view to the south, and before the construction of the downtown banking towers in the late 1960s, the top floor observation deck was, at almost 800 feet (244 metres) above sea level, the highest point in Toronto; on a clear day visitors could see the rising spray from Niagara Falls, across Lake Ontario.

The interior layout in its office days was based on the 'core' concept, with most offices having windows and with the various service elements (elevators and meeting rooms) clustered in the center. With its thick walls, relatively small windows, a built-in cafeteria, a location separated from major targets, and large offices that could be converted to wards, the IOB was designed to be used, in the event of nuclear attack, as an alternative hospital.

The ground floor lobby features a famous mural, "The Story of Oil", executed by York Wilson in 1957. Three years in the planning and construction, the two panels of the diptych are each 25 feet by 32 feet; the left-hand side of the mural depicts the nature of oil from its prehistoric origins, while the right-hand panel portrays the modern benefits of its exploitation. The mural is made of vinyl acetate and is mounted to the wall in such a way that vibrations in the building will not be transmitted to the artwork, possibly causing it to crack. In addition, a ventilation system behind the same wall prevents moisture collecting on the material. Crawley Films of Ottawa was engaged to document the artwork's realization.

A three-part mural by Oscar Cahén was completed in 1956, for the building's staff lounge and dining facility on the eighth floor. These were abstract compositions in bold, bright colours, one with a sun motif. Painted on canvas, two sections were de-installed in 1979 and are now owned by the Robert McLaughlin Gallery in Oshawa, Ontario. As of 2014, they await conservation and a permanent home. The third section was lost.

== History ==
The architectural model for this building was originally a proposed design for a new Toronto City Hall. However, Nathan Phillips, Toronto's mayor in 1955, rejected the Mathers and Haldenby design for city hall and opened the commission to an international competition that was eventually won by Finnish architect Viljo Revell. Imperial Oil, in search of a design for their Toronto head office, bought the design from Mathers and Haldenby.

During construction, catering to the wealthy local residents, welding was used, rather than the then-customary and much noisier riveting technique. The building, on completion, was the largest all-welded steel frame building in the world.

When Imperial Oil assembled the residential properties for the site, Isabel Massie, owner of a house at 59 Foxbar Road, on a long angular lot at the rear of the site, refused to sell, despite being offered up to $100,000 for her house, at the time a princely sum. As a result, Imperial Oil had to move its building closer to St. Clair Avenue than planned. Until she died in 1964, her property jutted into the Imperial Oil parking lot, an icon of a citizen's refusal to give in to a corporation. Her heirs sold the house for $70,000 to Imperial Oil, which demolished it to expand the parking lot. The last traces of Isabel Massie's house, roughly across the street from 38 Foxbar Road, were dug up in 2012 when the subsequent owner excavated for an underground parking garage.

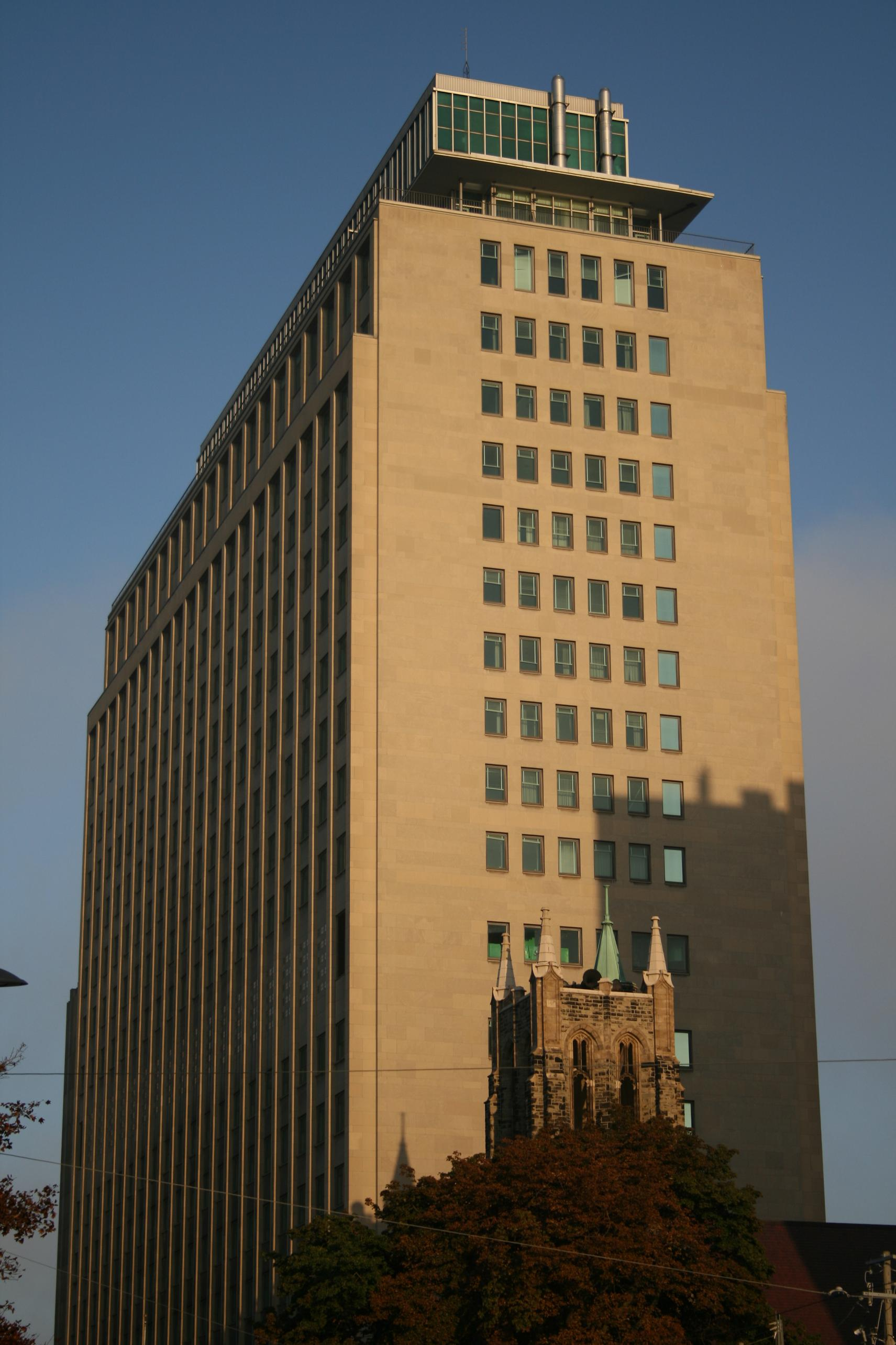
The Imperial Oil Building from the west, giving a better view of the observation deck at its top

== Closure ==
As announced in a press conference on September 29, 2004, Imperial Oil re-located to Calgary, Alberta (some corporate operations moved to the Esso Building at 90 Wynford Drive in the Don Mills district). Thereafter, the building was unoccupied for several years. Soil testing before the property was listed for sale found that sand about 40 feet below the eastern part of the parking lot was contaminated with heating oil that had leaked from an underground storage tank. The soil was then excavated and replaced.

In preparation for the sale, Imperial Oil told Deer Park United Church next door that they would no longer supply building heat to the church, effective July 2008. This led the dwindling congregation to vacate the church building and share space with a nearby Presbyterian congregation (Calvin Presbyterian Church) which had split off from the original Deer Park congregation in the mid 1920s. The church building remains vacant as of late 2016, but it is slated for incorporation into a new condominium development, named "Blue Diamond".

== Imperial Plaza ==
The Imperial Oil building was sold in the summer of 2010 to condominium developer Camrost-Felcorp, which then began converting it into a condominium apartment building. At the same time, the church building next door was sold to a related developer, who subsequently sold a major interest to Camrost-Felcorp. The Imperial Oil building is now known as "Imperial Plaza". In addition to residential condominium units, the building includes an LCBO store and an upscale grocery store on the main floor.

The developers secured the City of Toronto's approval for a second tower near the southeast corner of the site, a third tower replacing most but not all of the former Deer Park United Church building, and 17 townhouses along the Foxbar Road frontage. As of February 2017, the tower near the southeast corner is under construction, and its street address is 101 St. Clair Avenue West. It is planned as a 26-storey building that will contain 229 high-end rental apartment units.

== See also ==
- Fifth Avenue Place (Calgary), Imperial Oil's current headquarters in Calgary
