= St. Andrew's United Church =

Coordinates: 43.669861°N 79.385761°W

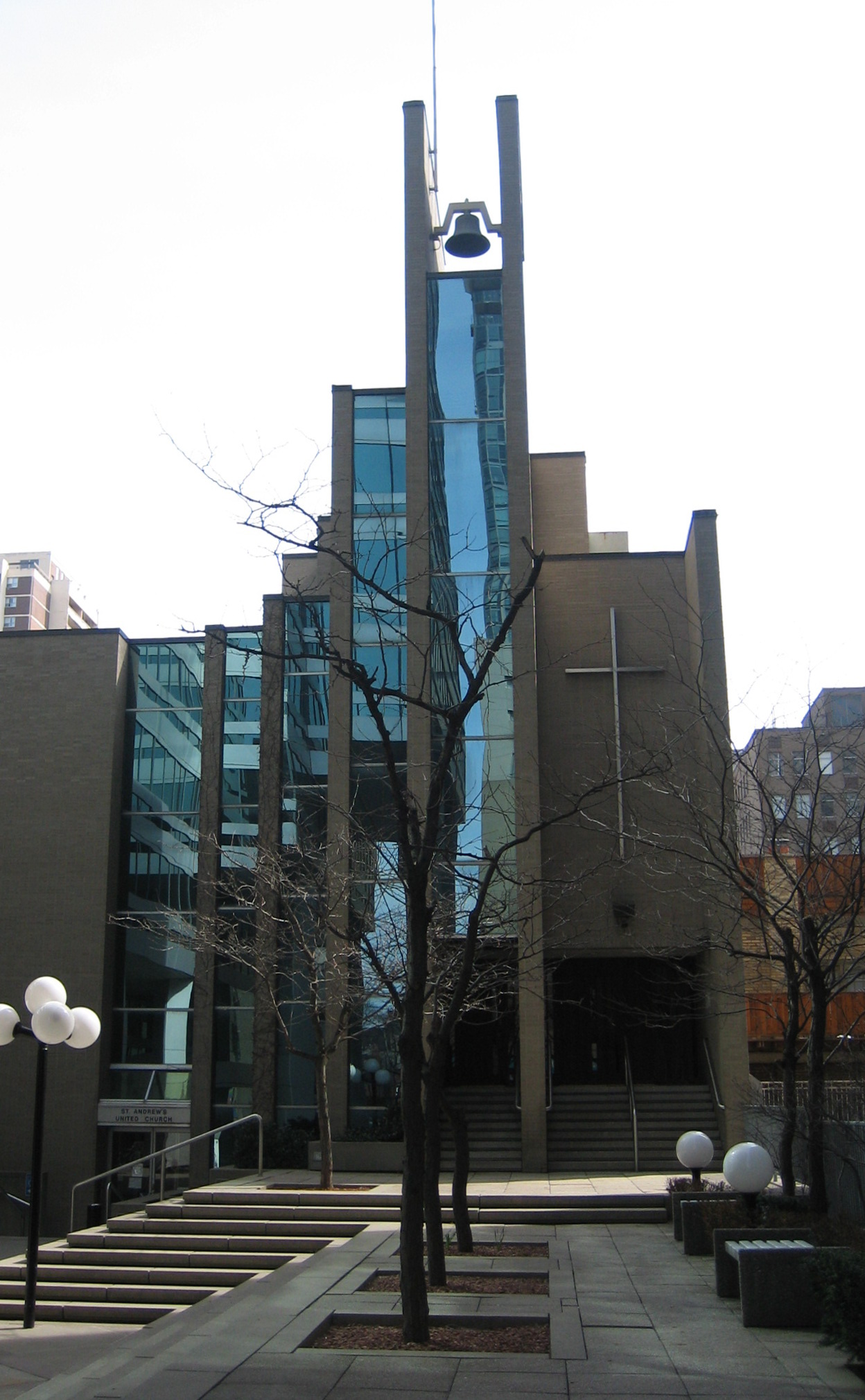
- View of the church building in 2009
- St. Andrew's United Church
- Location: 117 Bloor Street East; Toronto, Ontario; M4W 1A9
- Country: Canada
- Denomination: United Church of Canada
- Previous denomination: Church of Scotland
- Website: standrewsunited.com

St. Andrew's United Church is a historic congregation of the United Church of Canada in Toronto, Canada. Located in the city's downtown core near the intersection of Yonge and Bloor streets, it is a combination of five other downtown Toronto congregations.

== History ==
The church originated from St. Andrew's Church, which was founded in 1830 as the first Church of Scotland congregation in what was then the town of York. The original St. Andrew's was located at the southwest corner of Adelaide (then as Newgate) and Church Streets. By the 1870s, it had become clear that a new church building was needed. The downtown core had moved westward, and most of the congregation wanted to shift in that direction as well, but a minority staunchly opposed the idea. With the congregation thus split, the majority moved in 1876 to a new structure at King and Simcoe streets that still exists today as St. Andrew's Church.

The smaller part of the congregation stayed in the eastern part of town and became known as "Old St. Andrew's", and this church gave rise to the current St. Andrew's United. In 1878, the Old St. Andrew's congregation built a new church building at the corner of Jarvis and Carlton streets. With the formation of the United Church of Canada in 1925, Old St. Andrew's elected to join the new union, while St. Andrew's on King Street remained Presbyterian.

Over the next decades, the number of United Church supporters in the downtown area decreased dramatically, and a number of congregations were consolidated. Today, St. Andrew's is the descendant of four other congregations. Westminster-Central United merged with St. Andrew's in 1950. The name was established as St. Andrew's, but the congregation left the Jarvis Street building and moved to the location of Westminster-Central, which was on Bloor near Yonge. The Jarvis Street building was sold to two Baltic Lutheran congregations, which were then quickly increasing in number in Toronto. They kept the St. Andrew name and continued until recently to operate as St. Andrew's Evangelical Lutheran Church.

Westminster-Central was itself the combination of three historic Toronto churches. Westminster Presbyterian was the first established on the site in 1891. It merged with Grosvenor Street Presbyterian in 1921, when the latter church's building was demolished as part of a plan to extend Bay Street. When the United Church was formed, Westminster then merged with Central Methodist Church, which was located just across the street. This created Westminster-Central, which continued until the merger with St. Andrew's in 1950. The final merger was in 1973 with Yonge Street United Church, which was originally located at Yonge and Summerhill before it was destroyed by fire in May 1971.

The Westminster building that was the home of St. Andrew's after 1950 had been built in 1923, after the original 1891 structure on the site was destroyed by fire in 1920. In the mid-1970s, great debate arose in the congregation about the state of the church. It was low on funds, but sitting on some of the most expensive real estate in Canada. After considerable discussion, it was decided to demolish the old church, build an office tower above, and relocate the congregation to the lower level of the new complex. The redevelopment was completed in 1981, although the design of the final project had changed considerably.

The existing church at 117 Bloor Street East is a separate building facing Bloor and is set back into the urban courtyard, St. Andrew's Square. It is adjacent to the office tower at 121 Bloor Street East. A portion of the old church was retained by the city of Toronto and is now located further south on Yonge Street, marking the entrance to McGill Street as McGill Street Arch. Several other United Churches chose the same path during this period, such as College Street United Church (1990) and Parkdale United Church (1977).

== Past buildings ==
The past buildings that housed St. Andrew's and the other congregations that have merged to create it:

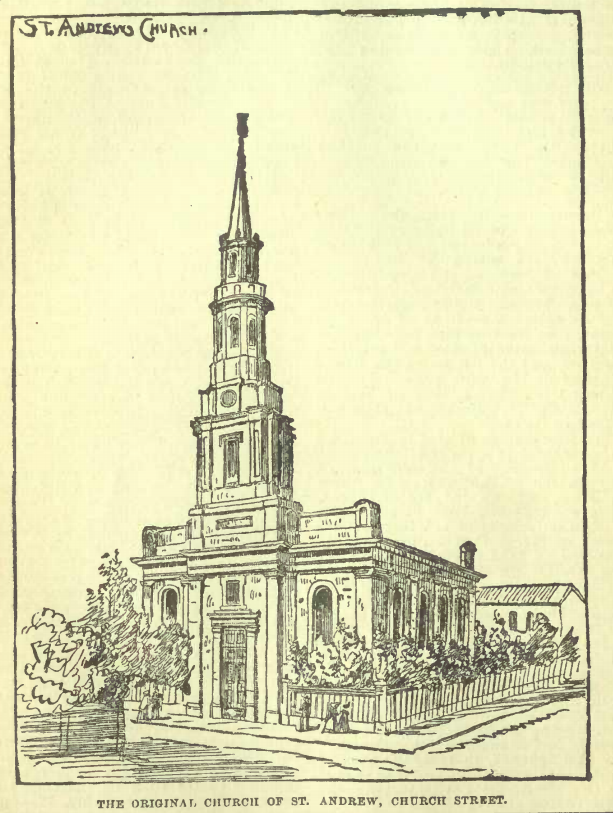
The first St. Andrew's, used from 1830-1878. Most members left St. Andrew's Church in 1876

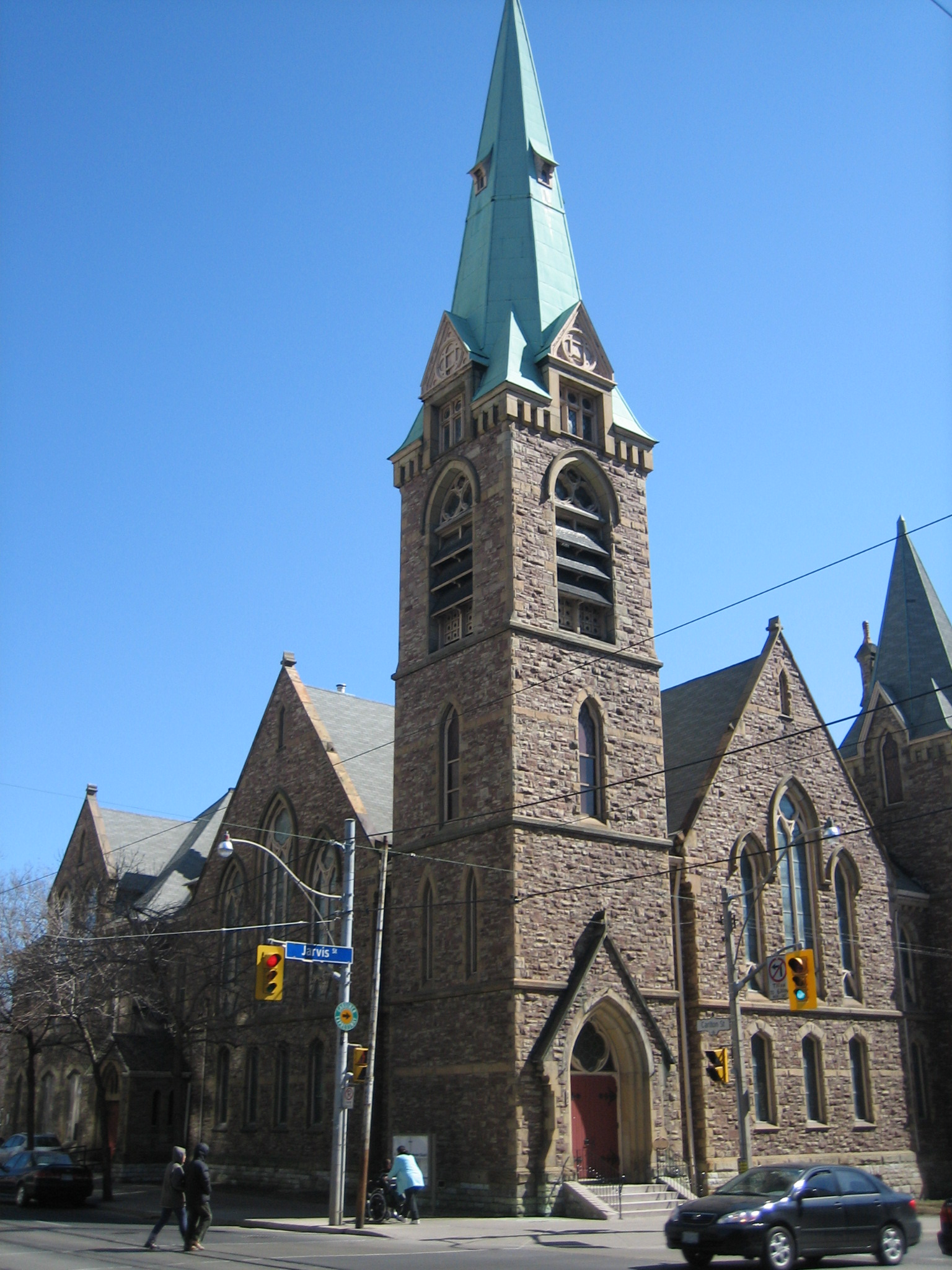
Old St. Andrew's home to St. Andrew's from 1878 to 1950, today St. Andrew's Evangelical Lutheran Church

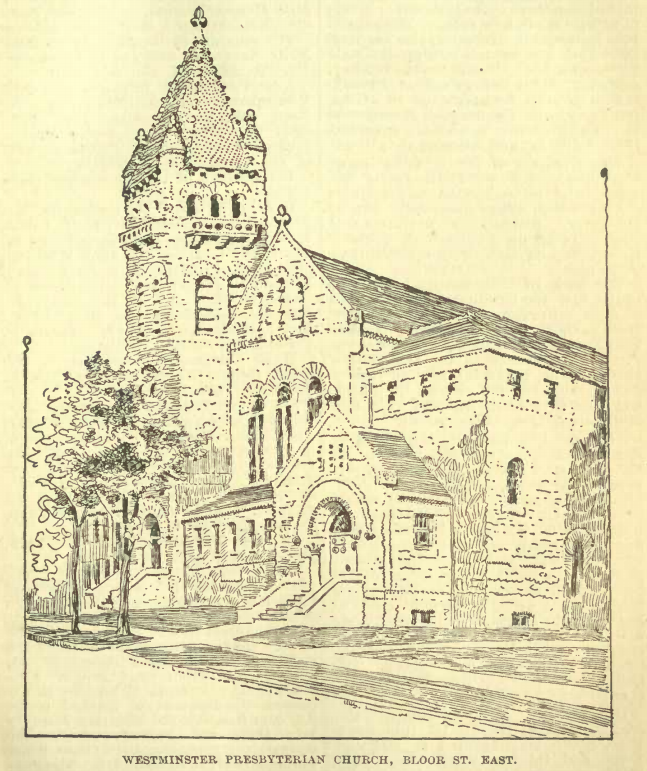
Westminster Presbyterian established in 1891, building destroyed by fire in 1920

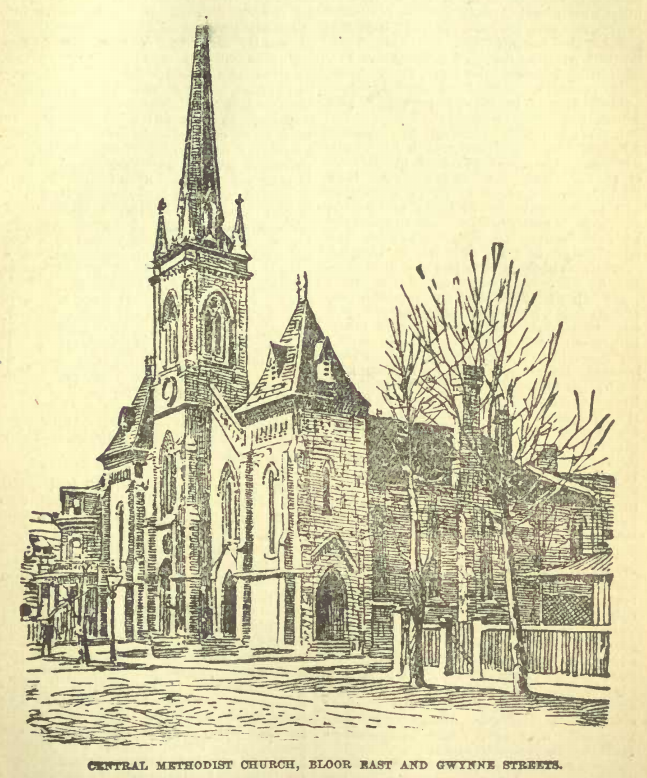
Central Methodist merged with Westminster in 1925

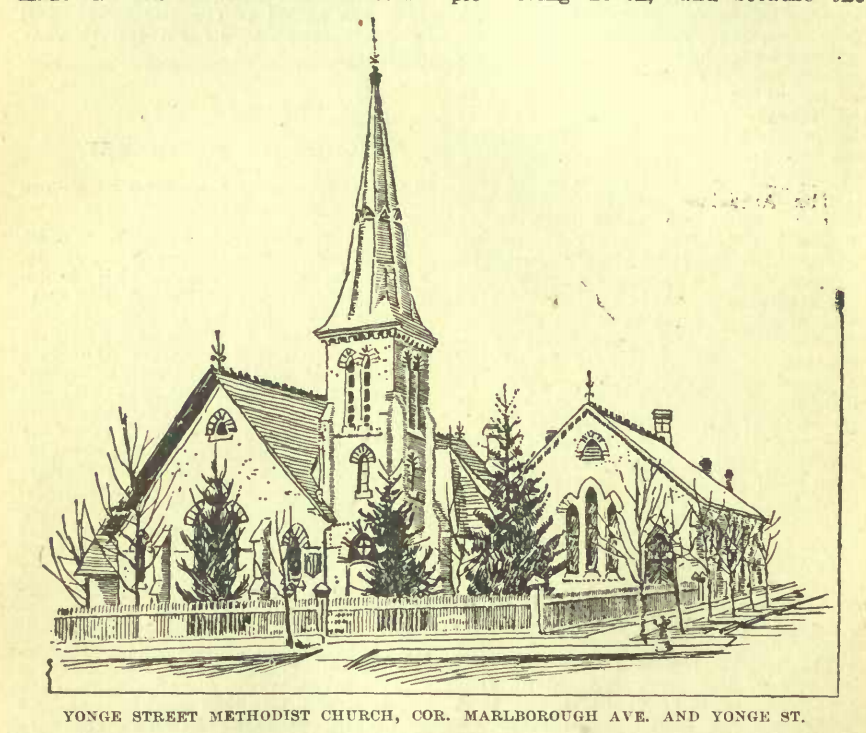
Home of Yonge Street Methodist from founding in 1873 to destroyed by fire 1911

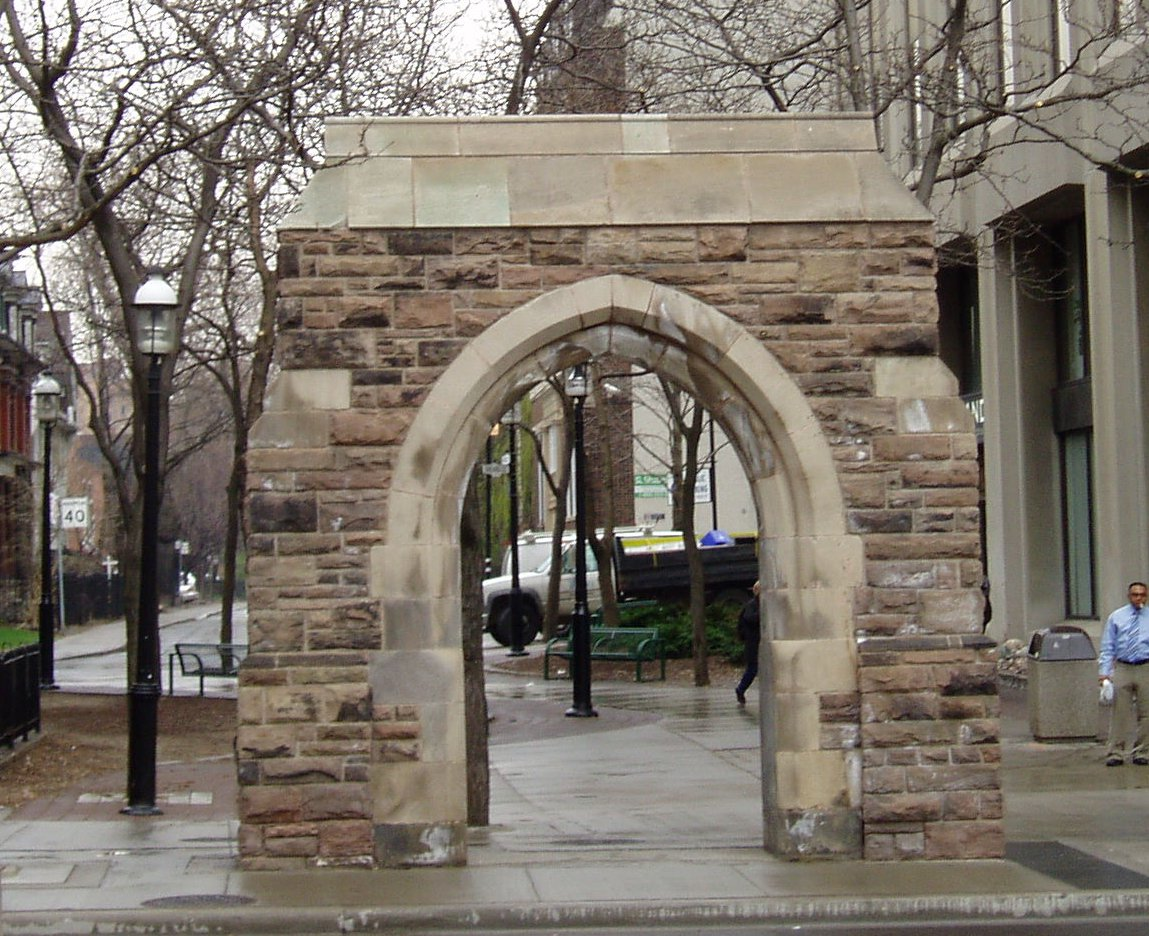
The Arch on Yonge Street that is all that remains of the Bloor St. church demolished in 1981

== See also ==
- List of United Church of Canada churches in Toronto
