= Wisconsin Weekly Advocate =

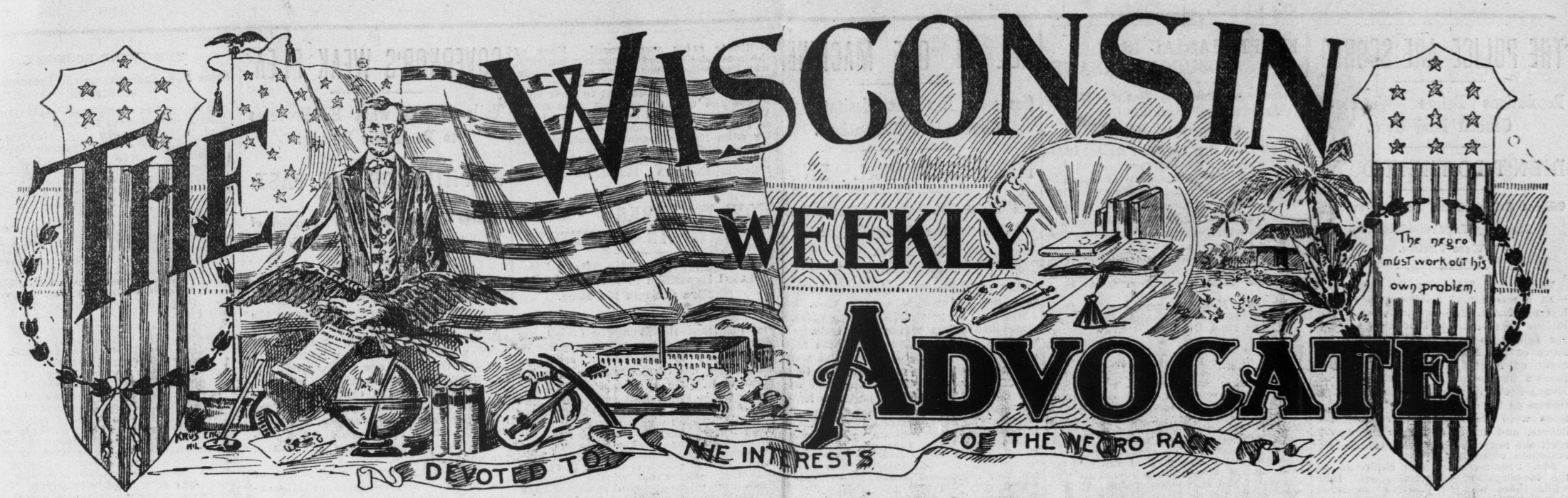
- Type: Weekly Newspaper
- Format: Broadsheet
- Editor: Richard B. Montgomery
- Founded: 1898-05-07
- Language: English
- Headquarters: Milwaukee, Wisconsin

Wisconsin Weekly Advocate was an African American owned and operated newspaper in Milwaukee, Wisconsin. Founded by Richard B. Montgomery, the Advocate started with the May 7, 1898 issue . The Advocate published an 8-page tabloid weekly until September 19, 1907. However, there are other claims that it ceased production on 1915.

== Background ==
The Wisconsin Weekly Advocate was founded by Richard B. Montgomery in Milwaukee, Wisconsin on May 7, 1898. Born in Mississippi in 1858, Montgomery was a former slave, traveling missionary, and correspondent of the Indianapolis Freeman. The paper also owned the Colored Helping Hand Intelligence Office, allowing various African American employment opportunities to be advertised for African American shops and businesses.

== Content and editorial stance ==
The Wisconsin Weekly Advocate aligned with the views of Montgomery, who advocated for Booker T. Washington's philosophy of Black self-help and economic advancement. The publication regularly included masthead slogans such as "For the Interest of the Negro Race" and "The Negro Must Work Out his Own Problems". These appeared on every issue as a public declaration of the paper's editorial commitments. Montgomery also hired Lillian Maxey, Wisconsin's first female African-American journalist, who served as the paper's "city editress".

== Historical context ==
The Wisconsin Weekly Advocate was published in a larger network of African American newspapers during the late 19th and early 20th centuries. These newspapers published community news, political advocacy, and economic opportunities in Black communities. In Wisconsin, such newspapers documented local African American life.

== Office locations ==
The paper's headquarters moved several times during its operation. Known addresses included offices on Fifth Street, St. Paul Avenue, Eighth Street, Kilbourn Avenue, and Wells Street which are all within Milwaukee's Central Business District.
