= Deer Park United Church =

Coordinates: 43.68648°N 79.400194°W

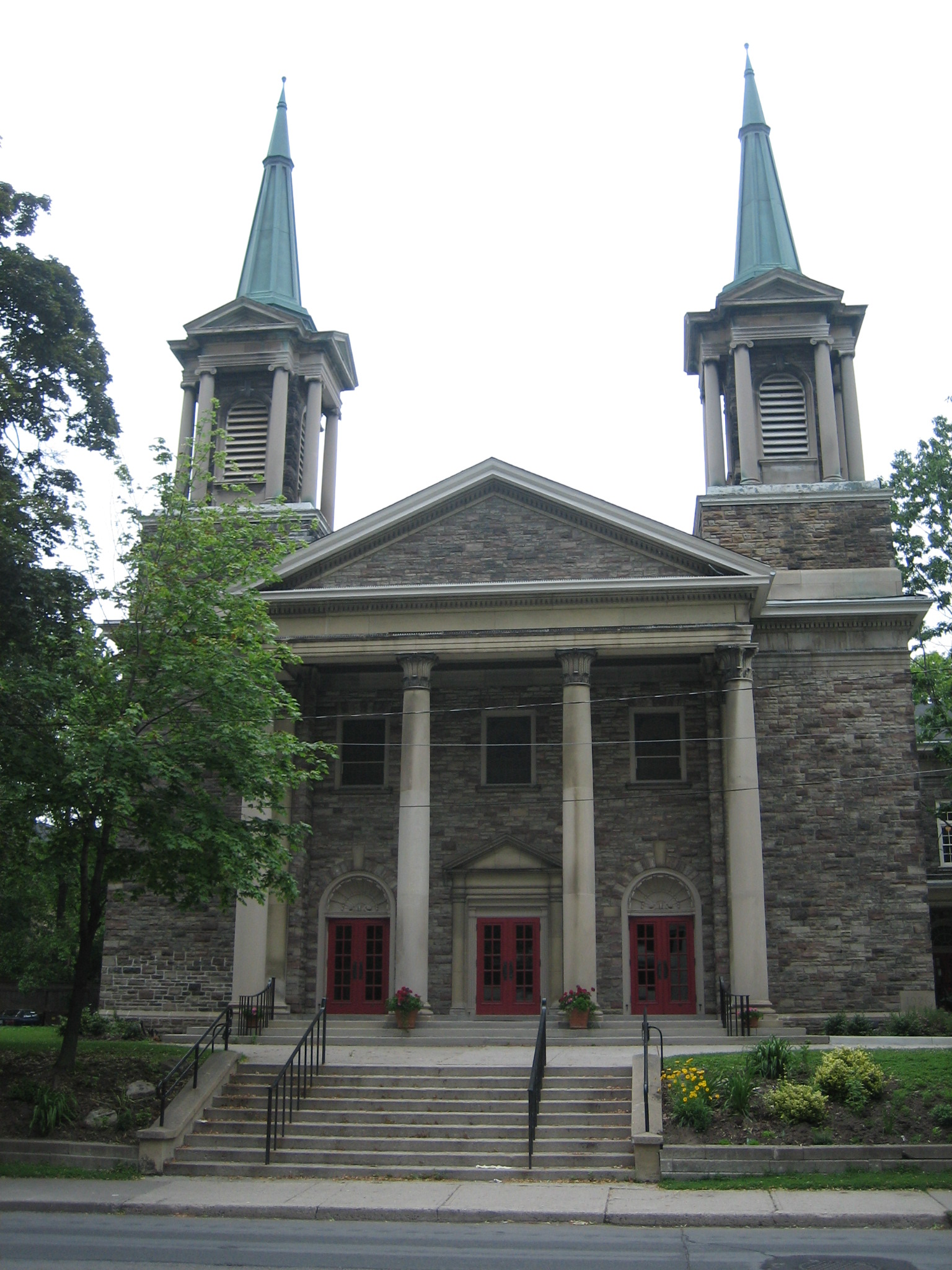
- The congregation's building at 26 Delisle Avenue, shared with Calvin Presbyterian
- Deer Park United Church
- Location: 26 Delisle Avenue; Toronto, Ontario; M4V 1S5
- Denomination: United Church of Canada
- Previous denomination: Presbyterian (1881–1925)
- Website: deerparkunitedchurch.org

Former Deer Park United Church
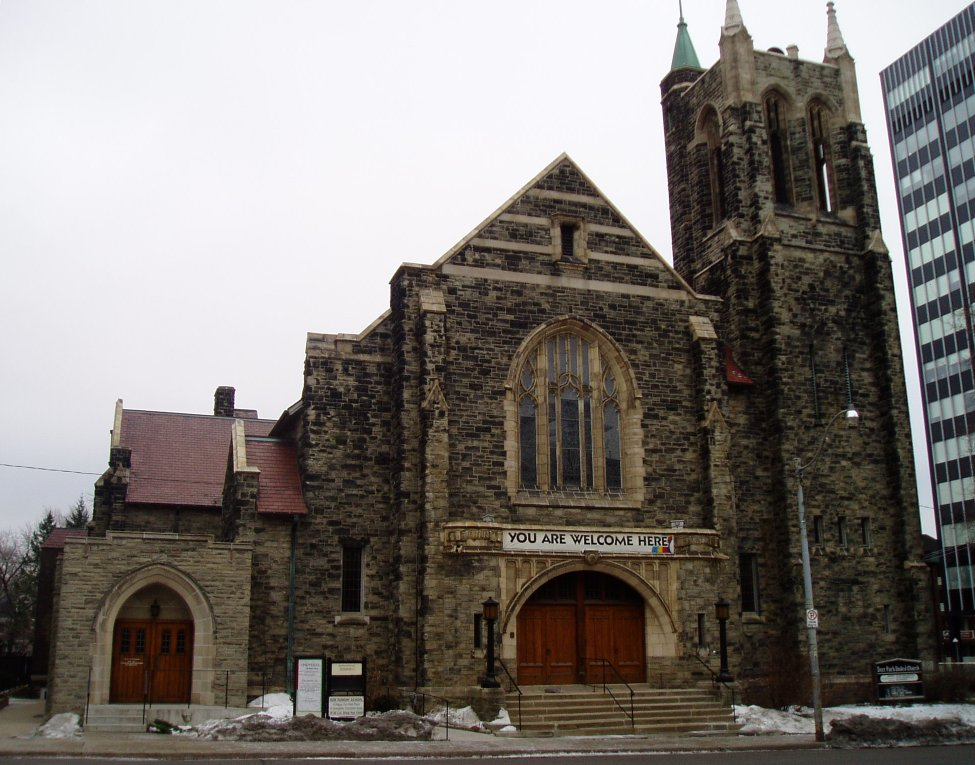
- The church building in 2005

Religion
- Affiliation: Formerly United Church
- Ownership: Privately owned
- Status: Redundant church that is being redeveloped

Location
- Location: 129 St. Clair Avenue West; Toronto, Ontario; M4V 1N5
- Interactive map of Former Deer Park United Church

Architecture
- Style: Gothic Revival
- Completed: 1913
- Materials: Stone

Website
- bluediamondcondos.ca

Deer Park United Church is the name of a United Church of Canada congregation, and also the name of this congregation's former church building at 129 St. Clair Avenue West in the Deer Park neighbourhood of Toronto, Ontario, Canada. It was one of two United Church of Canada buildings in the area and along St. Clair Avenue, the other being Timothy Eaton Memorial Church (originally Methodist).

== Early history ==
The congregation began in 1881 as the Deer Park Presbyterian Mission. Their first church building was constructed on the northwest corner of Yonge Street and St. Clair Avenue, now home to an office tower which formerly housed the studios and offices of CFRB and 99.9 Mix FM until 20114 and currently houses Boom 97.3 and Flow 93.5. In 1913, a new church building was erected for the congregation at 129 St. Clair Avenue West.

The first missionary was the Rev. George Edwin Freeman. His granddaughter, Lois Wilson, served as a United Church Moderator (from 1980 to 1982) and as a Canadian Senator (from 1998 to 2002).

In 1925, a majority of the congregation voted to join the newly formed United Church of Canada. The 370 members who voted to remain Presbyterian withdrew and formed what is now Calvin Presbyterian Church.

== Recent history ==
In 2006, the Deer Park United congregation celebrated its 125th anniversary. The next year, the congregation was told that the owners of the Imperial Oil Building next door would no longer supply building heat after July 2008. Due to the financial inability to maintain the large and aging building, the congregation de-sanctified the building at 129 St. Clair Avenue West in June 2008.

The building was sold to a developer, who in 2012 got the City of Toronto government's approval for a condominium apartment tower replacing most, but not all, of the church building. It remained vacant at that time. The developer subsequently sold a majority interest in the property to Camrost-Felcorp, the redeveloper of the adjacent Imperial Oil Building. The development plan is to integrate part of the church building into the site of a new condominium tower (named "Blue Diamond") that was designed by Diamond Schmitt Architects.

The Deer Park United congregation was welcomed by the nearby Calvin Presbyterian Church congregation into a shared ecumenical worship. In 2010, the two congregations formalized their relationship into an Ecumenical Shared Ministry. The worship services contain common elements and also elements unique to the United Church of Canada and Presbyterian traditions. Both the Deer Park and Calvin congregations are members of the Churches on the Hill group.

The current address of the Deer Park United congregation is 26 Delisle Avenue, Toronto, Ontario. The congregation's minister is the Rev. Dr. Deborah Hart.

== See also ==
- List of United Church of Canada churches in Toronto
