= Trinity-St. Paul's United Church =

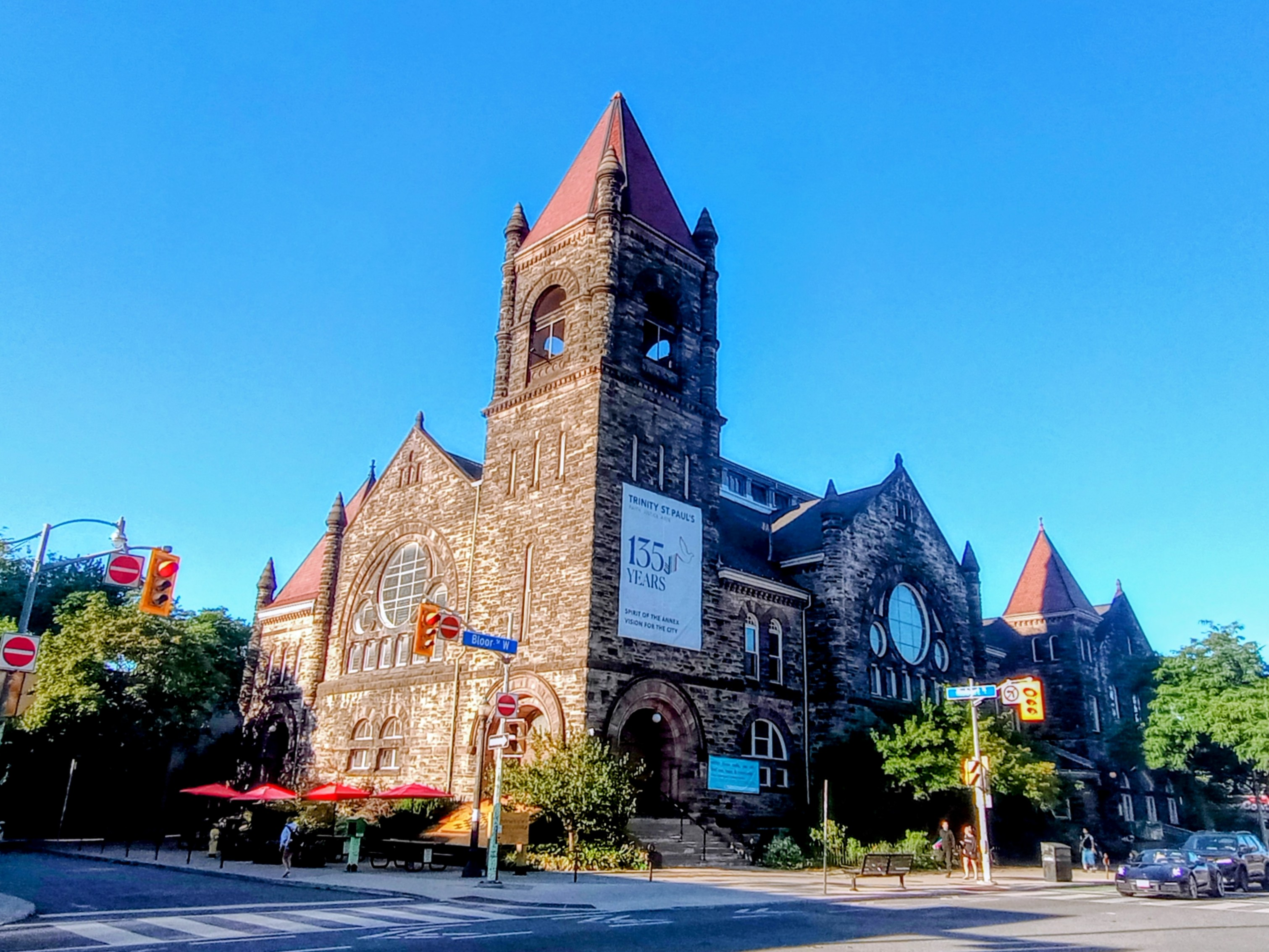
- The church building in 2025
- Trinity-St. Paul's United Church
- 43°39′58″N 79°24′20″W
- Location: 427 Bloor Street West; Toronto, Ontario; M5S 1X7
- Denomination: United Church of Canada
- Website: www.trinitystpauls.ca

Administration
- Province: Ontario; Toronto Conference

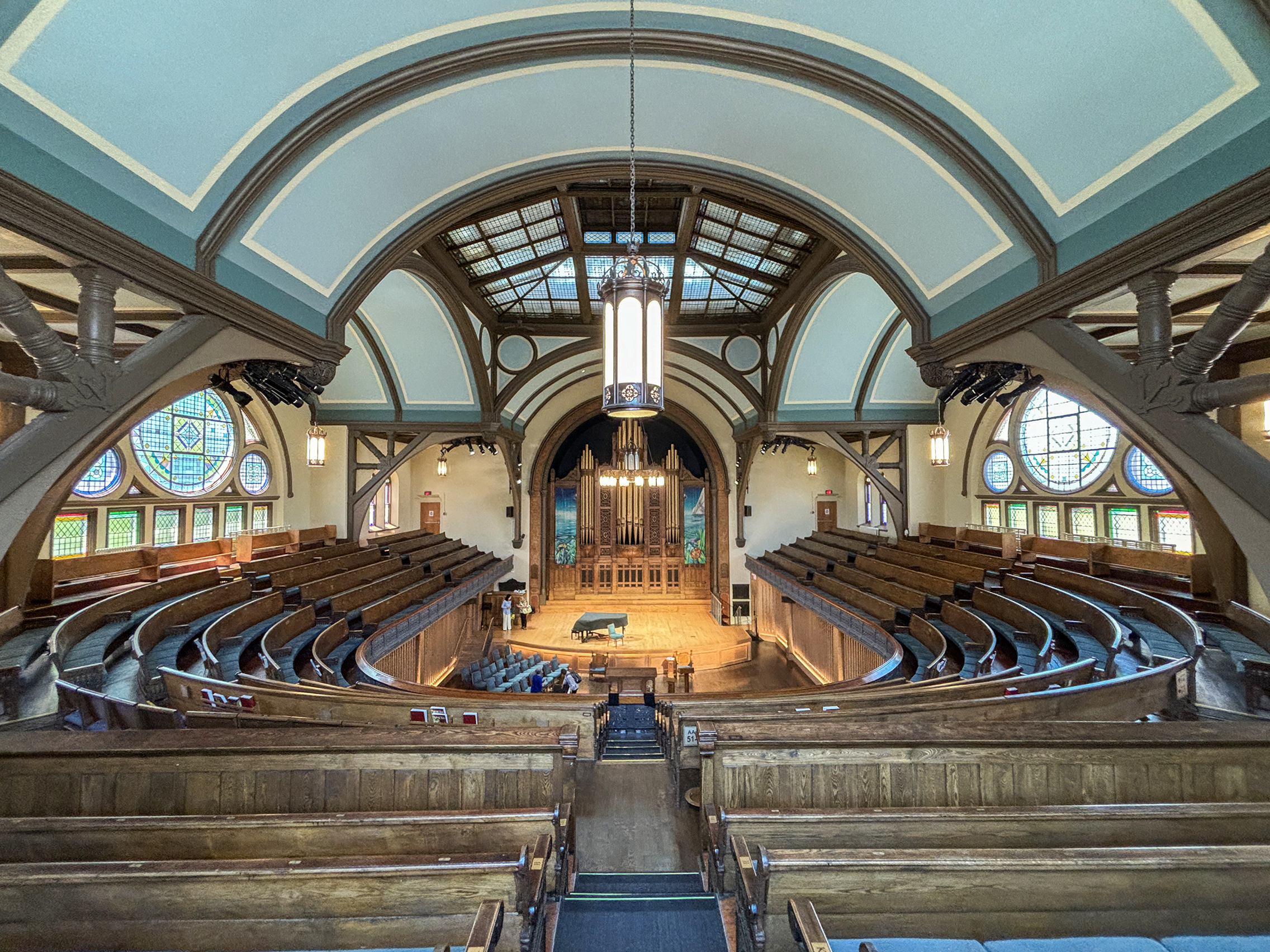
Interior of the church

Trinity-St. Paul's United Church and Centre for Faith, Justice and the Arts is a church belonging to the United Church of Canada in Toronto, Ontario, Canada. It is located at 427 Bloor Street West, just west of Spadina Avenue in the city's downtown core. The church is formed of a mix of three different former congregations and houses a fourth independent congregation within its building.

Today, Trinity-St. Paul's has a reputation for being an activist church on a number of social justice issues. The church has strongly advocated for same-sex marriage, fair trade and improved conditions for the homeless. Former United Church moderator and noted activist Bill Phipps was minister from 1974 to 1983. Cheri DiNovo, a former Ontario New Democratic Party politician, became minister effective February 4, 2018 until December 31, 2024.

== History ==
The church began as Trinity Methodist Church, and the current Romanesque Revival building was completed in 1889. With church union in 1925, it became Trinity United Church. In 1980, it merged with St. Paul's-Avenue Road United Church, which was itself a merger of St. Paul's Methodist and Avenue Road Presbyterian.

== Other occupants ==
- Bathurst Street United Church - In 1985, nearby Bathurst Street United decided to relocate to the Trinity-St. Paul's United building, but it remains a separate congregation.
- Tafelmusik Baroque Orchestra & Chamber Choir also uses the building for their facility.

== See also ==
- List of United Church of Canada churches in Toronto
