= York Wilson =

Canadian artist (1907–1984)

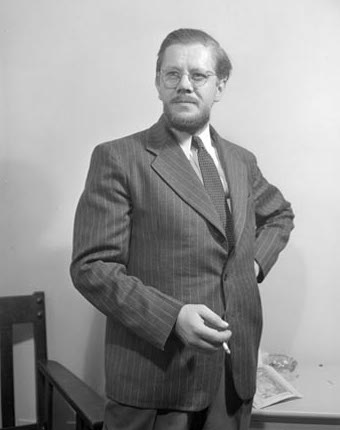
- Born: Ronald York Wilson; December 6, 1907; Toronto, Ontario, Canada
- Died: February 10, 1984 (aged 76); Toronto, Ontario, Canada
- Education: Central Technical School, Ontario College of Art, and Detroit Institute of Arts
- Known for: Painter, muralist
- Spouse: Lela May Miller (m. 1932)

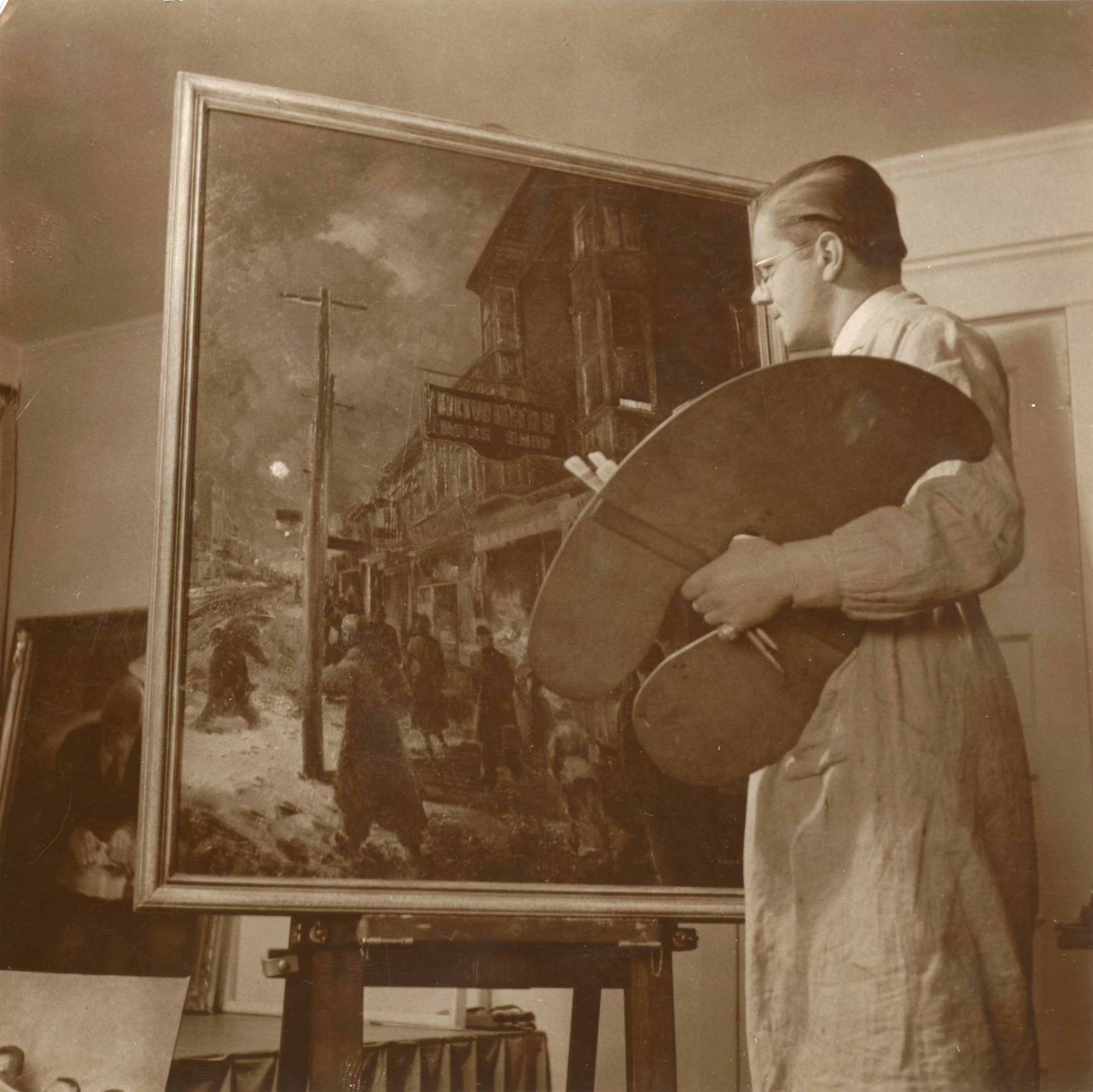
York Wilson at work, 1943

Ronald York Wilson RCA, also known as R. York Wilson, (December 6, 1907 – February 10, 1984) was a Canadian painter and muralist.

== Career ==
York Wilson was trained at the Central Technical School, but he was mainly self-taught. He began as a commercial artist and illustrator, working for Brigden's engraving house in Toronto (1926) where he was influenced by Charles Comfort and Will Ogilvie, then at Sampson-Matthews Limited. He took night classes at the Ontario College of Art, and later at the Detroit Institute of Arts. In 1927, Wilson began working in Detroit where he learned illustration and lettering and was also exposed to museums and books about fine art. However, he lost his job due to the Great Depression and returned to Canada in 1930. His paintings from the early 1930s to the mid 1950s were representational and even, social realist and satirical, as, for instance, his Welfare Worker (1941).

In 1949, Wilson's first six-month sojourn in Mexico at the artist’s colony of San Miguel de Allende became a turning-point in his life. He began working as a full-time artist, initially signing his paintings R. York Wilson, and later, York Wilson. While in Mexico in the early 1950s, he met David Alfaro Siqueiros who taught Wilson how to use pyroxylin (Duco). His trip to Mexico that year and in 1953 led to the influence of Rico Lebrun, whom he was to admire life-long, and stimulated an interest in mural painting. On still another trip to Mexico in 1955, he learned about vinyl acetate. In the late 1950s, he began painting abstractly, and in the 1960s, turned to geometric abstraction.

He is known for his murals at Toronto's O'Keefe Centre (today's Meridian Hall) (1960), the Salvation Army Headquarters, Imperial Oil Building (Toronto, 1957), Bell Telephone Building (Toronto), and Central Hospital. He was a member of the Royal Canadian Academy of Arts. He also a member of the Ontario Society of Artists (1942) and its President (1946–1948) as well as the Canadian Group of Painters.

== After his death ==
In 1997, through a substantial donation by Lela and Maxwell Henderson (Lela Wilson's second husband), the 'York Wilson Endowment Award' was established with the Canada Council for the Arts.

In 2011, the York Wilson Foundation for Visual Arts was created to maintain his artistic legacy, as well as offering access to Wilson's body of work for public engagement and education. Since 2011, it has actively worked on donating hundreds of artworks by the artist, and maintained a central source of research material on the artist, including images of artworks, video, and research and writing.

In 2016, Linda Jansma curated a show of 15 paintings by Wilson, titled York Wilson: A Legacy, for the Robert McLaughlin Gallery, Oshawa.

In 2017, the Beaverbrook Art Gallery announced an outstanding gift from the York Wilson Foundation for the Visual Arts. The donation, consisting of over 850 works of art, financial support for programming, and a digital archive of the artist's works, represents the largest single collection of York Wilson's work.
