= Central United Church =

Coordinates: 43°42′05″N 79°31′13″W

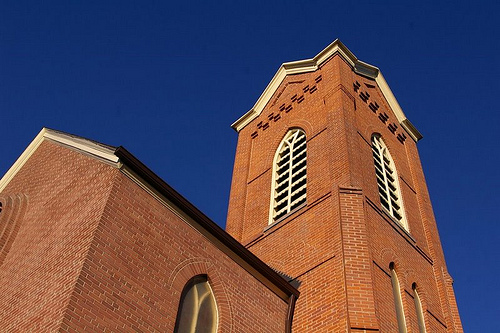
- Central United Church
- Central United Church
- Location: 1 King Street; Toronto, Ontario; M9N 1K8
- Denomination: United Church of Canada (1925)
- Previous denomination: Methodist Episcopal Church,

History
- Status: Church (building)

Architecture
- Functional status: Active
- Architectural type: Norman-Gothic

Central United Church is a historic congregation of the United Church of Canada located in the community of Weston, now a neighbourhood of Toronto, Ontario, Canada. Founded in 1821, the church has occupied the same site on Weston Road in Toronto since then.

The congregation began as part of the Methodist Episcopal Church, a forerunner of both the Methodist Church of Canada (1884) and the United Church of Canada (1925). The first church building, a log structure, was erected in 1821, followed by a larger brick church constructed in 1849. The present building, dedicated in 1887, and built in the Gothic Revival style, has been altered and updated on several occasions, but retains the landmark tower. The tower includes examples of abat-sons. The church was one of the final projects of William Henry Mallory Sr., architect.

The congregation has a unique musical heritage. The organ, constructed by Casavant Frères, was dedicated in 1950 as a memorial to members of the congregation who gave their lives in the Second World War. The Chancellors, a youth choir active from 1968 to 1980, produced five record albums and toured extensively.

The congregation has been served by several notable clergy, including Egerton Ryerson, historian George Playter and E.A. Pearson, the father of Prime Minister Lester B. Pearson.

Today, the church is well known for outreach into the community through the Weston King Neighbourhood Centre. The Centre provides meals, education and advocacy.

== WKNC ==
The Weston King Neighbourhood Centre (WKNC) has operated in the basement of the church since 2001. The charity offers hot meals daily (except Sundays), and also free groceries donated to the church. The charity also has multiple services on offer to those in need of help or support.

== See also ==
- List of oldest buildings and structures in Toronto
- List of United Church of Canada churches in Toronto
