= Asbury & West United Church =

Coordinates: 43.722607°N 79.431382°W

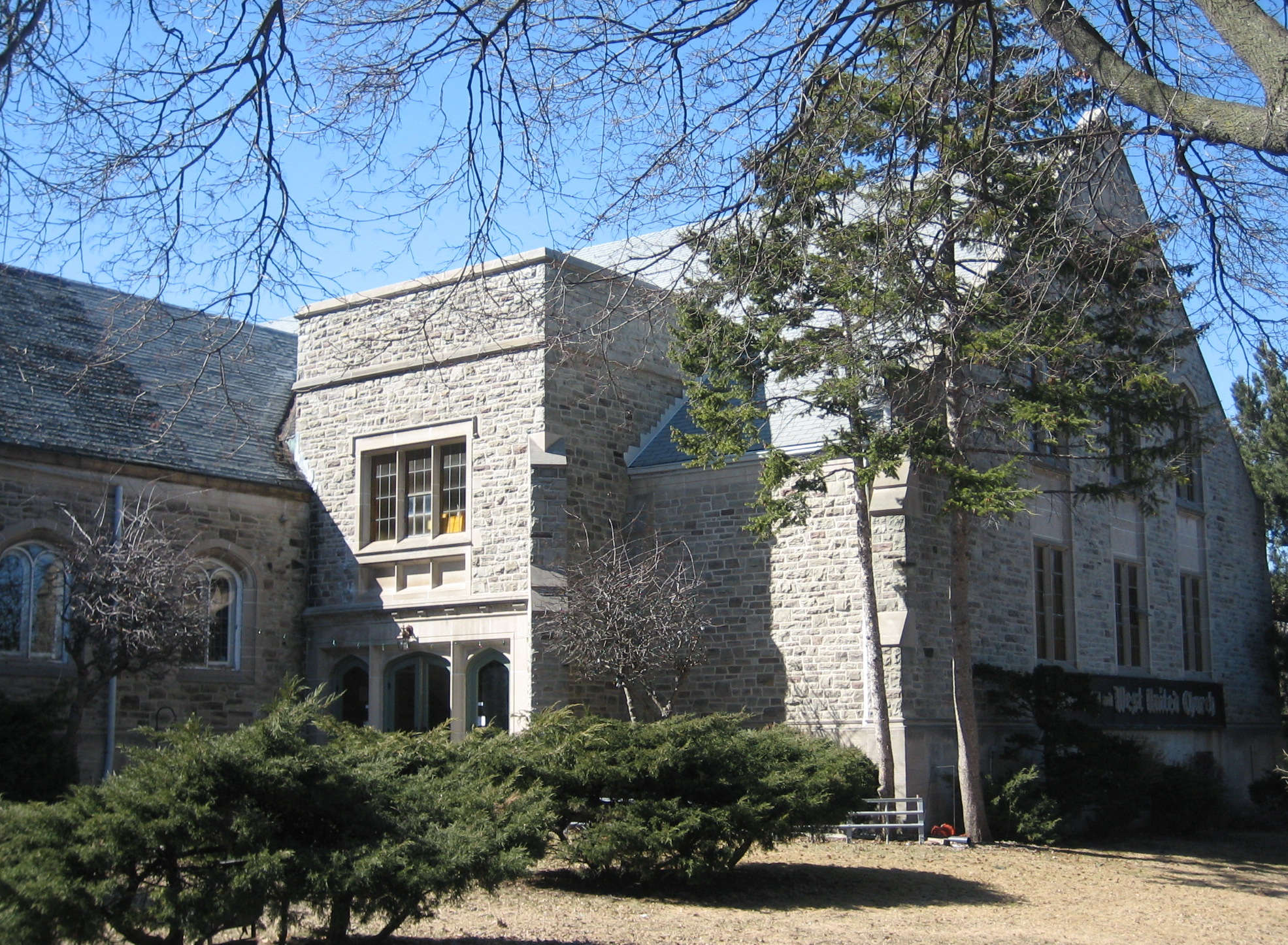
- Asbury & West United Church
- Asbury & West United Church
- Location: Bathurst and Lawrence area of Toronto, Ontario, Canada.
- Country: Canada
- Denomination: United Church of Canada

History
- Status: Cathedral

Architecture
- Functional status: Active
- Architectural type: Norman-Gothic

Asbury & West United Church is a United Church of Canada church in the Bathurst and Lawrence area of Toronto, Ontario, Canada. The congregation has one of the longest continual histories of any in Toronto. It traces its history back to 1812 and meetings of small groups of Methodist settlers in what was an area being newly settled by Europeans. The first services were held in the farmhouse of Henry Mulholland, a veteran of the War of 1812 and the Battle of Lundy's Lane. He first came to Canada from Ireland in 1806, settling in the area that would later be named Henry Farm after him. He later moved further west to what is now the Bathurst and Lawrence area.

The original small congregation was served by circuit preachers who rode out of the small nearby village of Eglinton, Ontario. In 1817 the congregation began to hold services in a new one room schoolhouse. Mulholland began to clear land for a permanent church building, but he died in the 1833 sinking of the Lady of the Lake. His widow, Jane, donated the land that was being cleared to the church, and a small wooden chapel was erected. The church was named after Francis Asbury, an early Methodist leader. This chapel was destroyed by fire in 1898, and a new brick church was built. In 1925 Asbury Methodist joined the United Church of Canada upon its formation, becoming Asbury United Church.

In 1947 the church merged with West United Church. This congregation began its ministry as West Presbyterian Church (in connection with the Free Church of Scotland) in 1860. It was started as a Sunday School from Knox's Free Church, and first met in a hall on Brock Street. A small building was erected in 1864 at Denison (between Spadina and Bathurst) and Queen Street West. In 1879, they constructed a new church building further north of Queen on Denison. In 1910, they moved, to College and Montrose (west of Bathurst), where they became West United Church in 1925 (voting 298-195 on February 27, 1925). In 1928 it was joined by the former Methodist congregation from nearby Clinton Street. By 1947, however, West United's congregation had shrunk, and merged with Asbury to the north. Its original site was sold in 1911 to the O'Keefe family and became St. Stanislaus Polish Catholic congregation in the Roman Catholic Archdiocese of Toronto. The College/Montrose corner is now home to a Spiritualist building that was constructed after West's departure.

While long the church for a small rural community, the area around the Asbury congregation changed dramatically with the rise of the suburbs as the Bathurst and Lawrence became part of the rapidly growing suburbs of North York. In the 1950s it was decided that with the families from the former West Congregation, and many newcomers to the community, a new larger church was needed, and the current structure was constructed in that decade.

== See also ==
- List of United Church of Canada churches in Toronto
