= Rosedale United Church =

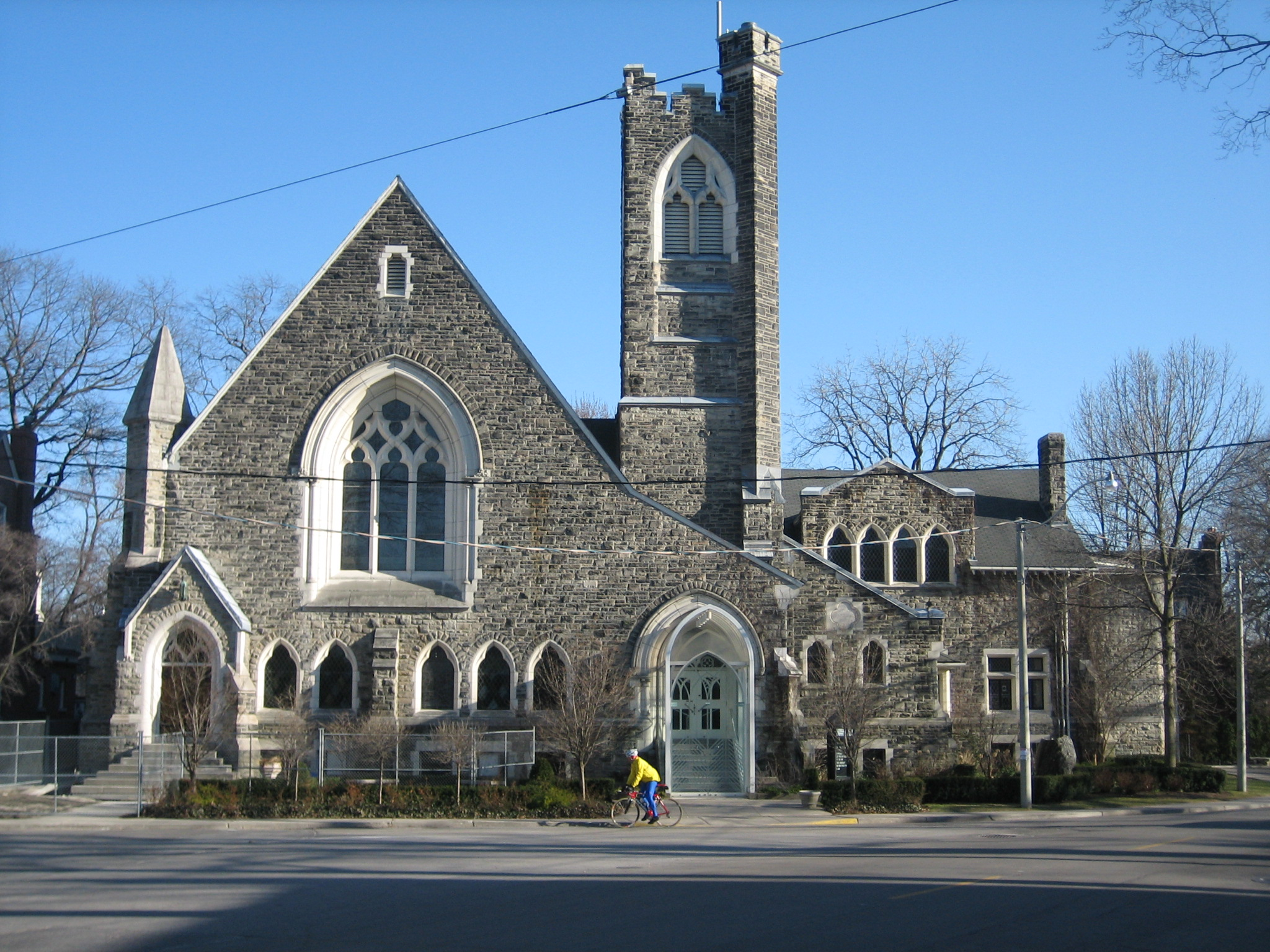
- Rosedale United Church
- 43.6841766°N 79.3726924°W
- Location: 159 Roxborough Drive; Toronto, Ontario
- Denomination: United Church of Canada
- Previous denomination: Congregationalist
- Website: rosedaleunited.org

History
- Former name: Northern Congregational Church

Architecture
- Architect: John Gemmell
- Style: Gothic Revival
- Completed: 1913

Rosedale United Church is a United Church of Canada church in Toronto, Ontario. It is located at 159 Roxborough Drive in the city's Rosedale neighbourhood.

== History ==
Rosedale United Church opened in 1914 as Northern Congregational Church. The congregation relocated to this location from a now-demolished church at 480 Church Street. The building was completed in 1913 in the Gothic Revival style by architect John Gemmell.

In 1925, when the Congregational Church merged with the Methodist Church of Canada and two-thirds of the Presbyterian Church in Canada to form the United Church of Canada, the church was renamed Rosedale United Church.

In 2014, singer Gordon Lightfoot was married to Kim Hasse, his third wife, in the church.

== See also ==
- List of United Church of Canada churches in Toronto
- Official website
