= St. Paul's-Avenue Road United Church =

Church building in Toronto, Canada

Coordinates: 43.6731°N 79.3955°W

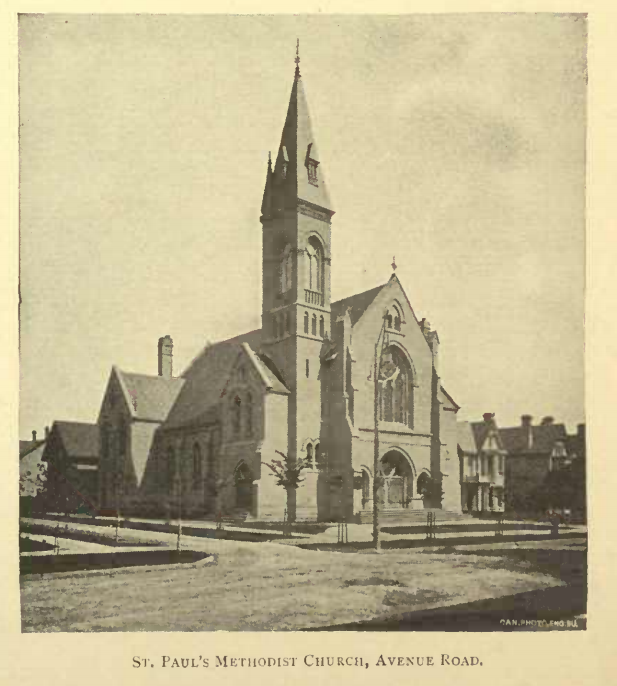
The church building around 1891, when it was called St. Paul's Methodist Church

St. Paul's-Avenue Road United Church was a church in Toronto, Ontario. It was founded in the 1870s as St. Paul's Methodist Church. Its home on Avenue Road, just north of Bloor Street in the Yorkville community, was built in 1877. With church union in 1925, it became St. Paul's United Church, and in 1930, it merged with the nearby Avenue Road United Church (previously Presbyterian) to form St. Paul's-Avenue Road United Church.

Originally, the congregation included many of Toronto's elite, but the church began to decline during the 1960s and 1970s. In 1980, the congregation merged with Trinity United Church on Bloor Street (west of Spadina Avenue) to form Trinity-St. Paul's United Church. The congregation based itself in the Trinity church building on Bloor Street, while the St. Paul's church building on Avenue Road was sold to developers. An acclaimed heritage property, there were several years of debate over what could be done with the structure. The developers hoped to demolish it, but this was blocked by the community and city council. The building became a gallery for the arts and music for several years.

In 1995, the church building was destroyed by fire, and accusations of arson were made. The destruction of the building, leaving it open for development, tripled the value of the property overnight. The insurance company refused to pay for the damage after it found evidence that the fire was deliberate. The property was subsequently developed in stages. Townhouses were built along Webster Avenue, while the property at the corner of Webster and Avenue Road was surrounded by hoardings. In 2024, a further development was announced on that corner site.

== See also ==
- List of United Church churches in Toronto
