= Randolph Theatre =

Theatre housed in a former church in Toronto, Ontario, Canada

Coordinates: 43.66351°N 79.41095°W

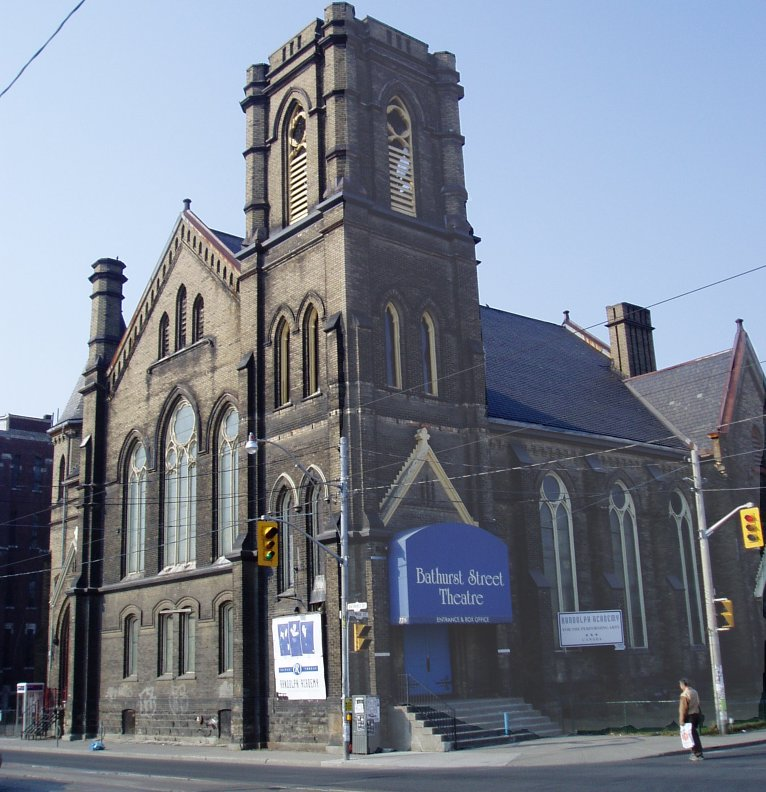
- The building in 2005
- Interactive map of Randolph Theatre
- Former names: Bathurst Street Theatre
- Address: 736 Bathurst Street; Toronto, Ontario
- Capacity: 518

Construction
- Architect: Gordon & Helliwell

The Randolph Theatre (formerly the Bathurst Street Theatre) is a 518 seat theatre in Toronto, Ontario, that is housed in a former church. The Gothic Revival building is located at 736 Bathurst Street at the intersection with Lennox Street. The theatre is in the former church sanctuary, while the 100-seat Annex Theatre is in an adjoining building at 730 Bathurst Street.

Oscar Peterson, Jim Carrey, Gordon Pinsent, Ted Dykstra, Eddie Izzard, Martin Bragg and the Toronto Fringe Festival are just some of the individuals and companies who have graced the stages and studios of 736 Bathurst Street. The Gothic revival building is a landmark, not only in the history of Toronto but also the heritage of theatre in Canada.

In addition, since March 2001, the building has been home to the Randolph Academy for the Performing Arts.

== History ==
The current building was erected in 1888 by the congregation of the Bathurst Street Wesleyan Methodist Church. The cornerstone was laid by Sir John A. Macdonald, first Prime Minister of Canada. Over the years it inspired many church congregations, eventually becoming the Bathurst Street United Church. In the 1950s, facing a dwindling congregation, the building began to be rented out for concerts and plays. The building became better known as a theatre than a church. In 1985, the building became a permanent and well known theatre.

The building was originally home to Bathurst Street Wesleyan Methodist Church. This congregation was an extension of Elm Street WMC, and started in 1860. In 1862, services were being conducted in a cottage on nearby Markham Street, and the area was known as Seaton Village, still outside of the Toronto city limits.

After a gift of land on Bathurst Street from the son of John Strachan, the first building on this site was constructed in 1866. Following a congregational split in 1869 (when Primitive Methodists in the area formed their own congregation), this congregation continued to grow and was joined by the former Primitive Methodist congregation in 1884, following the union of Methodists across Canada.

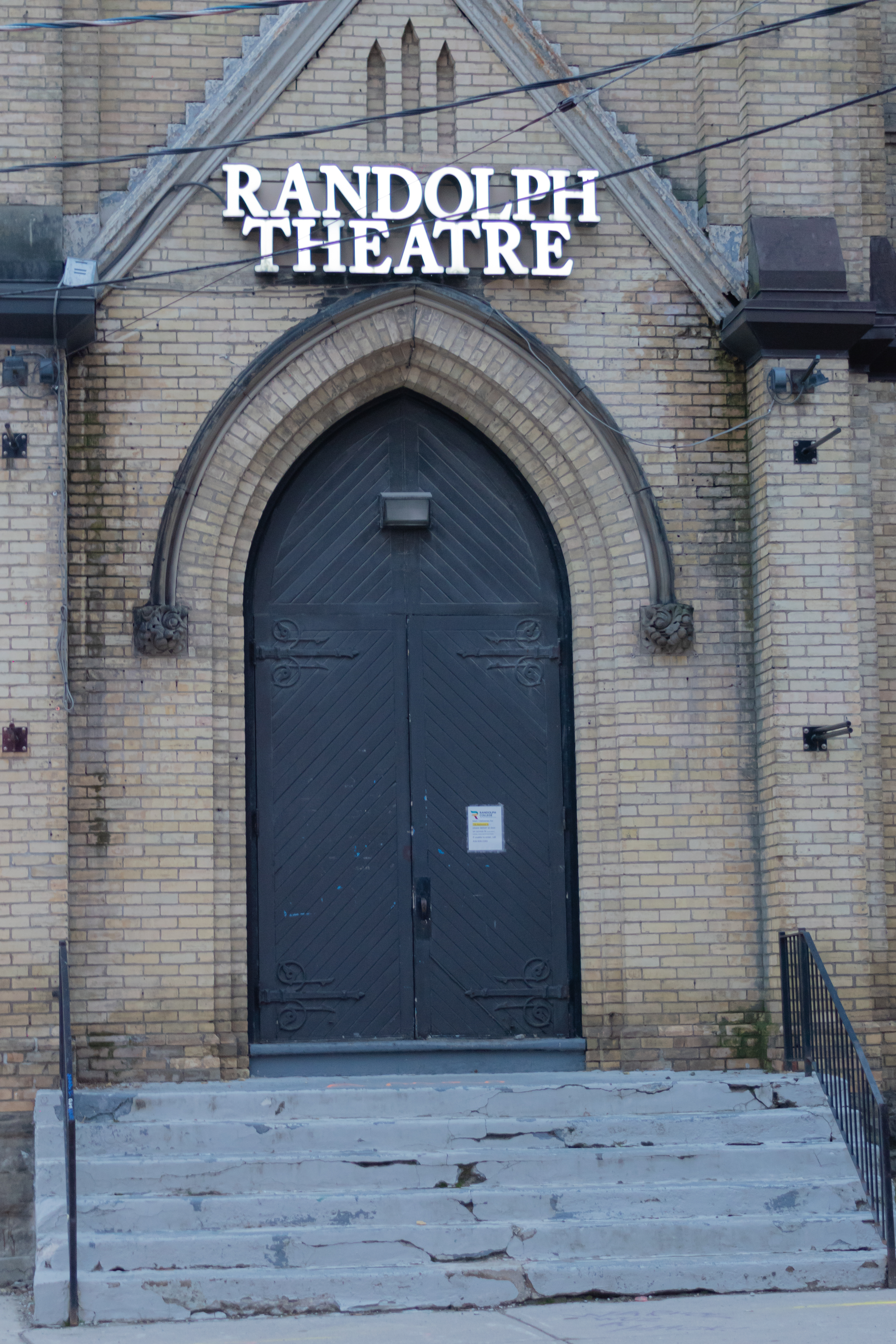
Entrance of the Randolph theatre

The present building (originally known as Bathurst Street Methodist Church) was erected by the congregation in 1888 to meet the demands of the growing population, and the United Methodist presence in Toronto. The building was designed by the architectural firm of Gordon & Helliwell.

In 1925, the congregation joined the new United Church of Canada and became Bathurst Street United Church. A minority of Presbyterians from St. Paul's PC (then located north of Bloor) joined, as St Paul's (which merged with Dovercourt Road PC in 1968, Chalmers in 1980, Dufferin Street PC in 1994, and closed in June 2005) remained within the Presbyterian Church in Canada.

In the 1950s, as the earlier families emigrated to the suburbs, the congregation shrank. A number of strategies were tried to increase attendance: one of these was the Sunday Evening Forums, wherein the Sunday evening sermon was replaced by a panel discussion on social issues among prominent guests. Running from 1944 to 1951, noted panelists included Communist Party of Canada leader Tim Buck, who lived nearby.

The small congregation had difficulty maintaining the old structure, and they began to rent out the building for concerts and plays. Increasingly, the building became better known for its role as a theatre than for being a church.

In 1985, the congregation finally opted to leave the building, and it now meets at nearby Trinity-St. Paul's United Church. The building then became a permanent and well-known theatre. In 2000, the United Church of Canada sold the building to George Randolph Jr.
