= Calvin Presbyterian Church (Toronto) =

Coordinates: 43.688756°N 79.395262°W

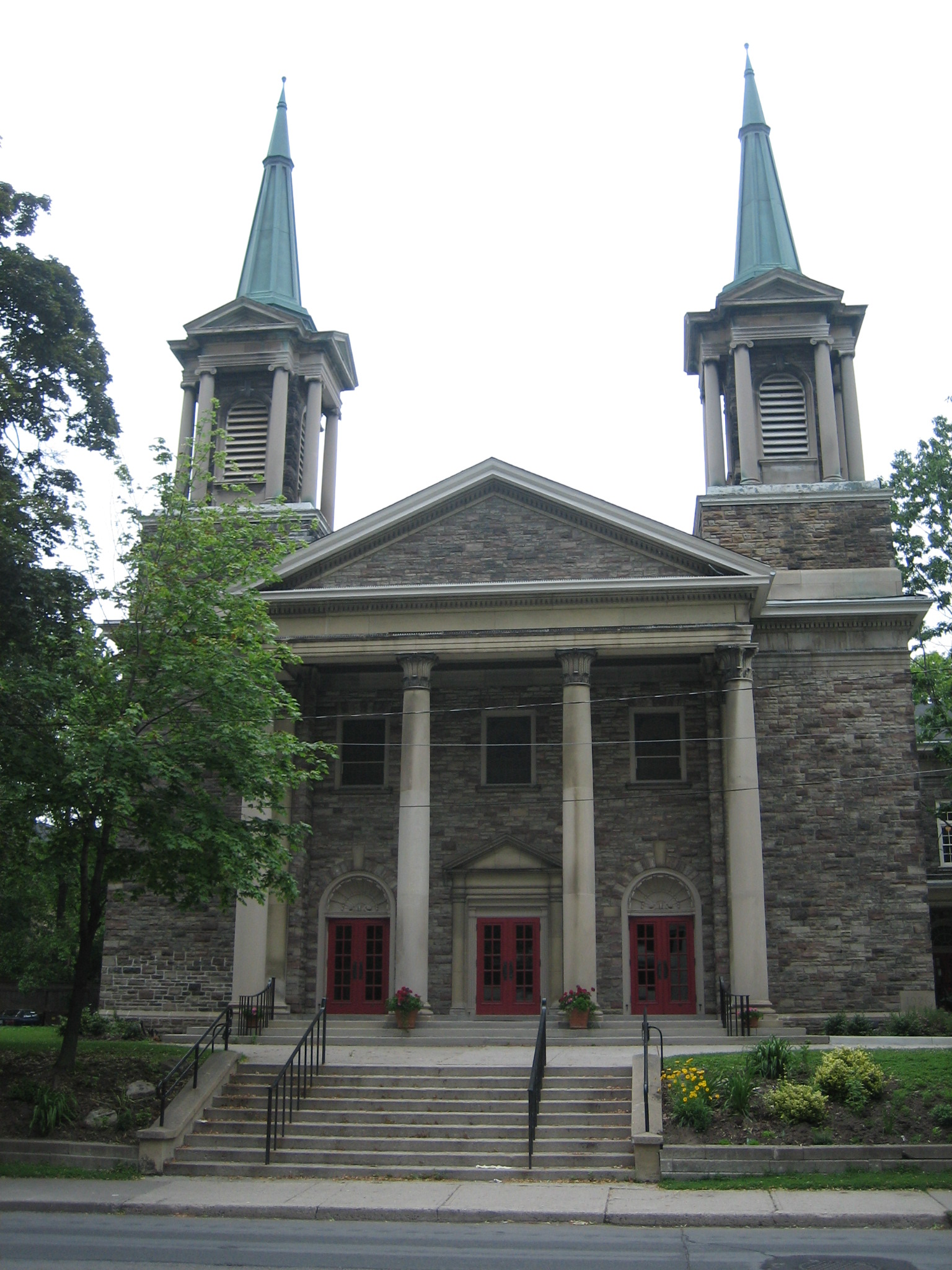
- The church building in 2008
- Calvin Presbyterian Church
- Location: 26 Delisle Avenue; Toronto, Ontario; M4V 1S5
- Denomination: Presbyterian Church in Canada
- Website: calvinchurchtoronto.com

Architecture
- Architect: Wickson and Gregg
- Style: Georgian Revival
- Groundbreaking: 1926
- Completed: 1927

Calvin Presbyterian Church is a Presbyterian Church in Canada congregation in the Deer Park area of Toronto, Ontario, Canada. The church building is located at 26 Delisle Avenue, close to Yonge Street and St. Clair Avenue.

== History ==
The congregation began as a "Minority Group" from nearby Deer Park Presbyterian Church (subsequently Deer Park United Church) that voted against joining the United Church of Canada in 1925. First known as "Hill District Presbyterians", they later named their congregation after Reformation leader John Calvin. The church building was designed in 1926 by the firm of Wickson and Gregg.

Calvin Presbyterian is part of the Churches on the Hill group, an ecumenical association of congregations, including Deer Park United, that meet regularly for study, fellowship, and local pursuits.

=== Senior Ministers ===
- The Rev. Dr. Joseph Wasson, 1926–1955
- The Rev. Dr. Douglas Herron, 1956–1985
- The Rev. Dr. Kendrick Borden, 1987–2000
- The Rev. Ian A.R. McDonald, 2002–c. 2011
- The Rev. Dr. Emily Bisset, 2012–present

== Music facility ==
Musicians and recording engineers value the unique reverberation pattern of the Calvin Presbyterian sanctuary, with its similarity to the Sofiensaal in Vienna.
