= College Street United Church =

Coordinates: 43.656565°N 79.408099°W

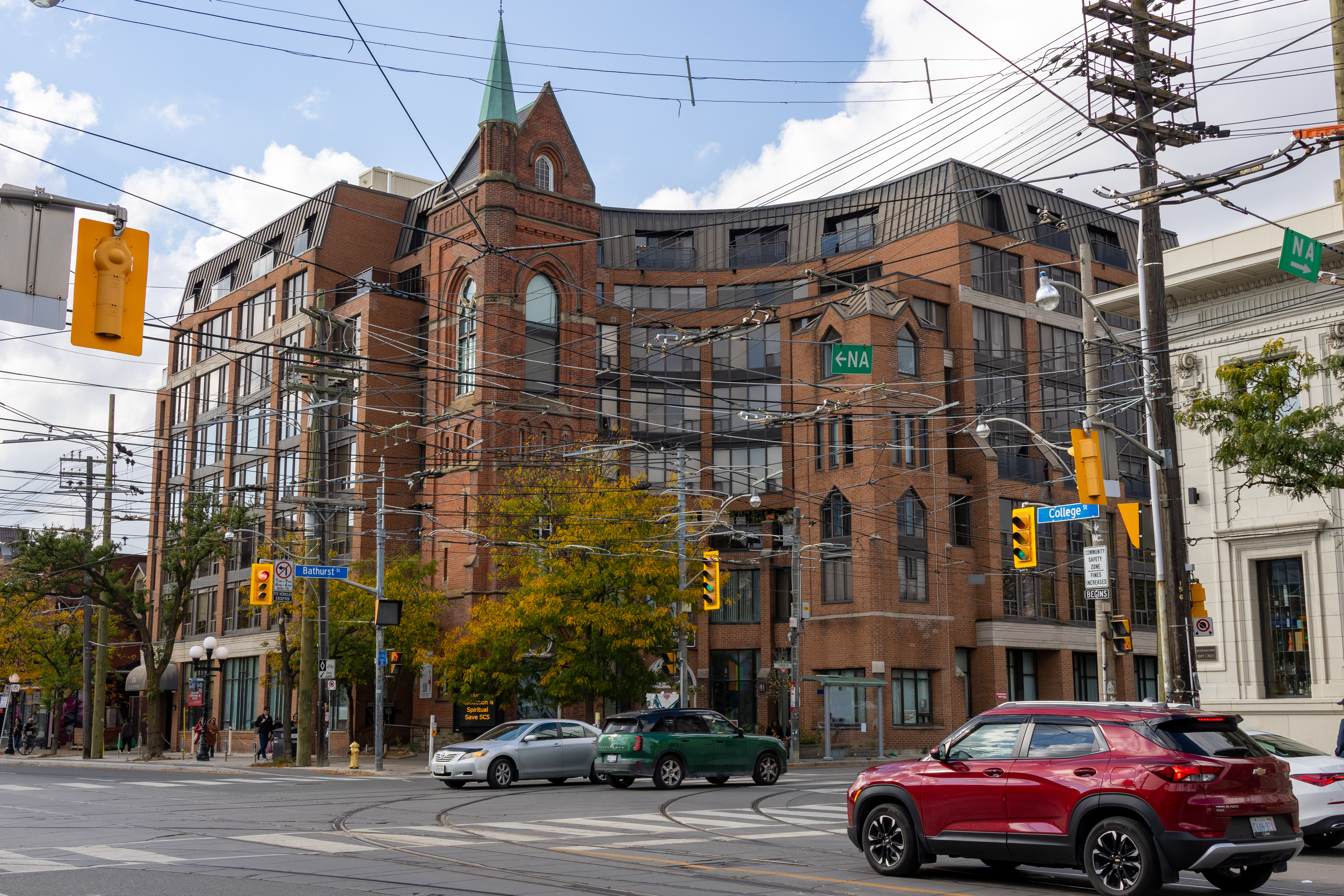
- College Street United Church in 2025
- College Street United Church
- Location: College and Bathurst Streets in Toronto, Ontario, Canada.
- Country: Canada
- Denomination: United Church of Canada
- Previous denomination: Presbyterian

History
- Former name: College Street Presbyterian
- Status: Cathedral

Architecture
- Functional status: Active
- Architectural type: Norman-Gothic
- Style: Gothic Revival

Specifications
- Capacity: 1500

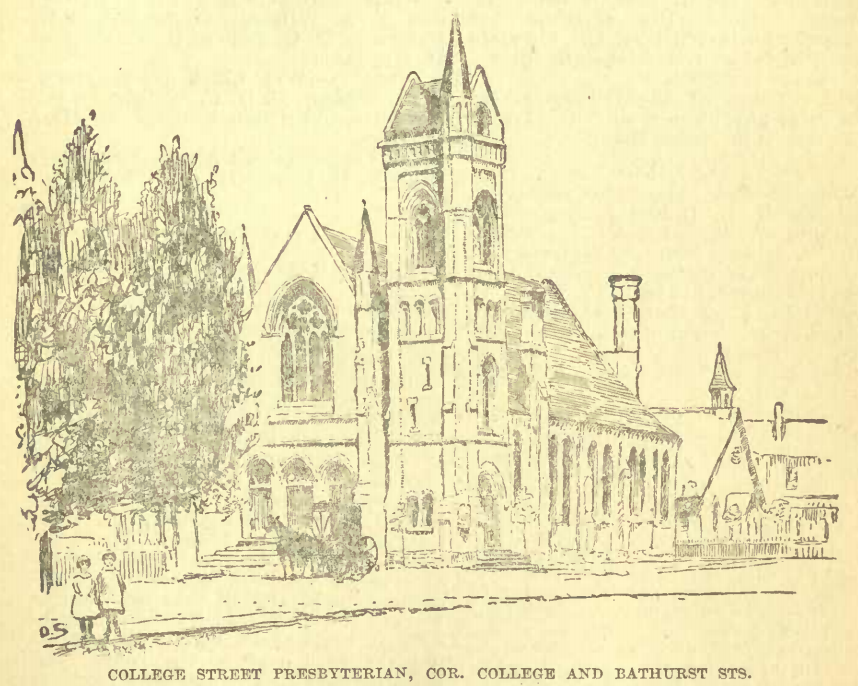
A sketch of the original church

College Street United Church is a United Church of Canada church at the corner of College and Bathurst Streets in Toronto, Ontario, Canada. As of 1990 the church is part of the same structure as The Channel Club Condo at 456 College Street.

The large church was built in 1885 as College Street Presbyterian and could hold 1200 worshippers, under founding (1874) minister Alexander Gilray (1874-1915), and Robert Balmer Cochrane (1915-1925). In 1925, this congregation voted to join the United Church, and was the site that June of the 51st and final General Assembly of the originally constituted Presbyterian Church in Canada before a majority of congregations of that founding denomination voted to enter the United Church of Canada. Over time attendance fell and it ran into financial difficulties and disrepair.

Despite its heritage status, it was decided to demolish much of the church, renovate the bell tower, and rebuild in 1990. The new building is 8 stories tall with an 89 suite condominium on top of the church. The architects of the new building worked to have it be as similar to the old church as possible, copying many of its architectural elements.

As of May 2024, Rev. Jeffrey Dale became the minister at College Street United Church, with a desire to live out the ministry and purpose through an understanding of College’s Vision Statement to be a ‘people helping people in the name of Jesus.’

== See also ==
- List of United Church of Canada churches in Toronto
