= Earlscourt =

Coordinates: 43.678°N 79.449°W

- Neighbourhood
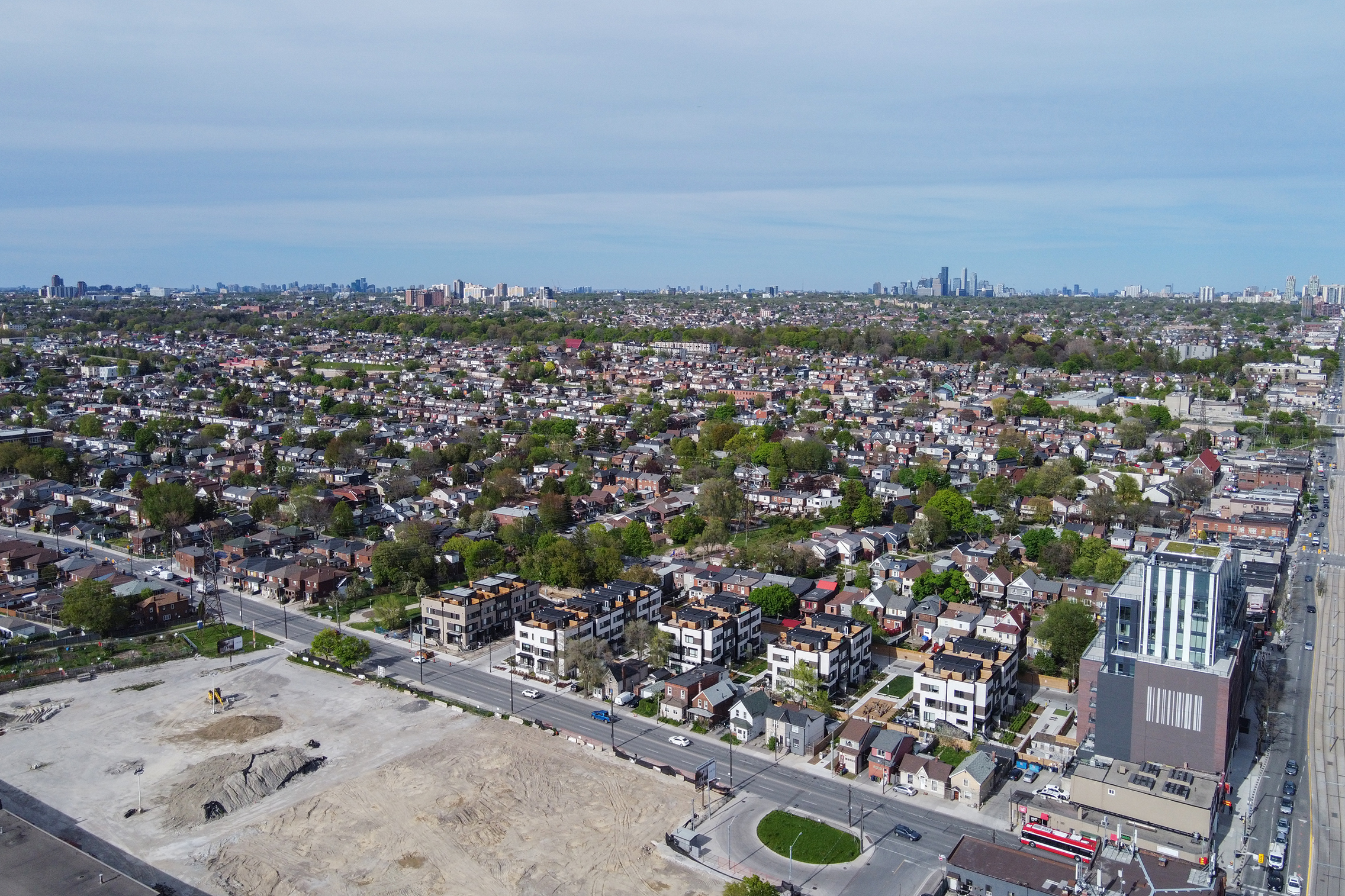
- Aerial view of Earlscourt from Old Weston Road in 2024

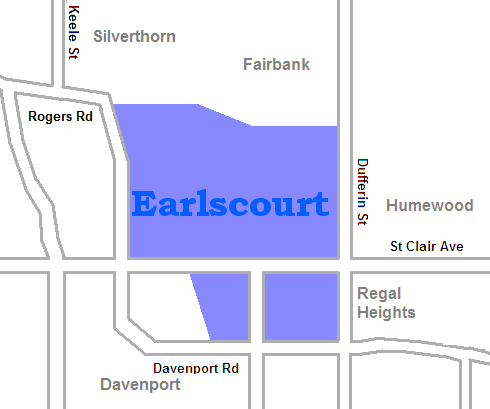
- Country: Canada
- Province: Ontario
- City: Toronto
- Established: 1792 York County
- Township: 1793 York Township
- Annexed: 1910 Toronto

Earlscourt is a neighbourhood in Toronto, Ontario, Canada. It is centred on St. Clair Avenue West, with Dufferin Street, Davenport Road, and Old Weston Road forming its boundaries. It is contained within the larger city-recognized neighbourhood of Corso Italia-Davenport.

Earlscourt Park is located on the south side of St. Clair between Caledonia Park Road and Lansdowne Avenue.

== History ==
Earlscourt began as a squatter settlement in the early 20th century and annexed by the City of Toronto in 1910. It was initially settled by British and Scottish immigrants. During World War I, the area had some of the highest enlistment rates in the British Empire. Several of the original settler shacks are still visible in the area. After the war the area became the centre of Toronto's Italian community, and it has remained a centre for Italian culture in Toronto. The stretch of St. Clair West that runs through the neighbourhood is known as Corso Italia.

== Education ==
Two public school boards operate elementary schools in Earlscourt, the Toronto Catholic District School Board (TCDSB), and the Toronto District School Board (TDSB). TDSB is secular public school board, the latter schools being operated by the Toronto Board of Education. TCDSB is an English-based separate public school board. Elementary schools in the area include:

- General Mercer Junior Public School (TDSB)
- Earlscourt Junior Public School (TDSB) and Stella Maris Catholic School (TCDSB)
- Richard W. Scott Catholic School (TCDSB) - closed in 2001, demolished

TCDSB operates one anglophone secondary school in the neighborhood, Loretto College School, founded in 1915 by the Sisters of Loreto on Brunswick Avenue. The current building was built in 2005 on the former Richard W. Scott property, whose building was partly used by students of Bishop Francis Marrocco Catholic High School since its inception in 1986.

One private school serves this neighbourhood, Hudson College, which was opened in 2002 in the Earlscourt school building.
