= Wallace Emerson =

- Neighbourhood
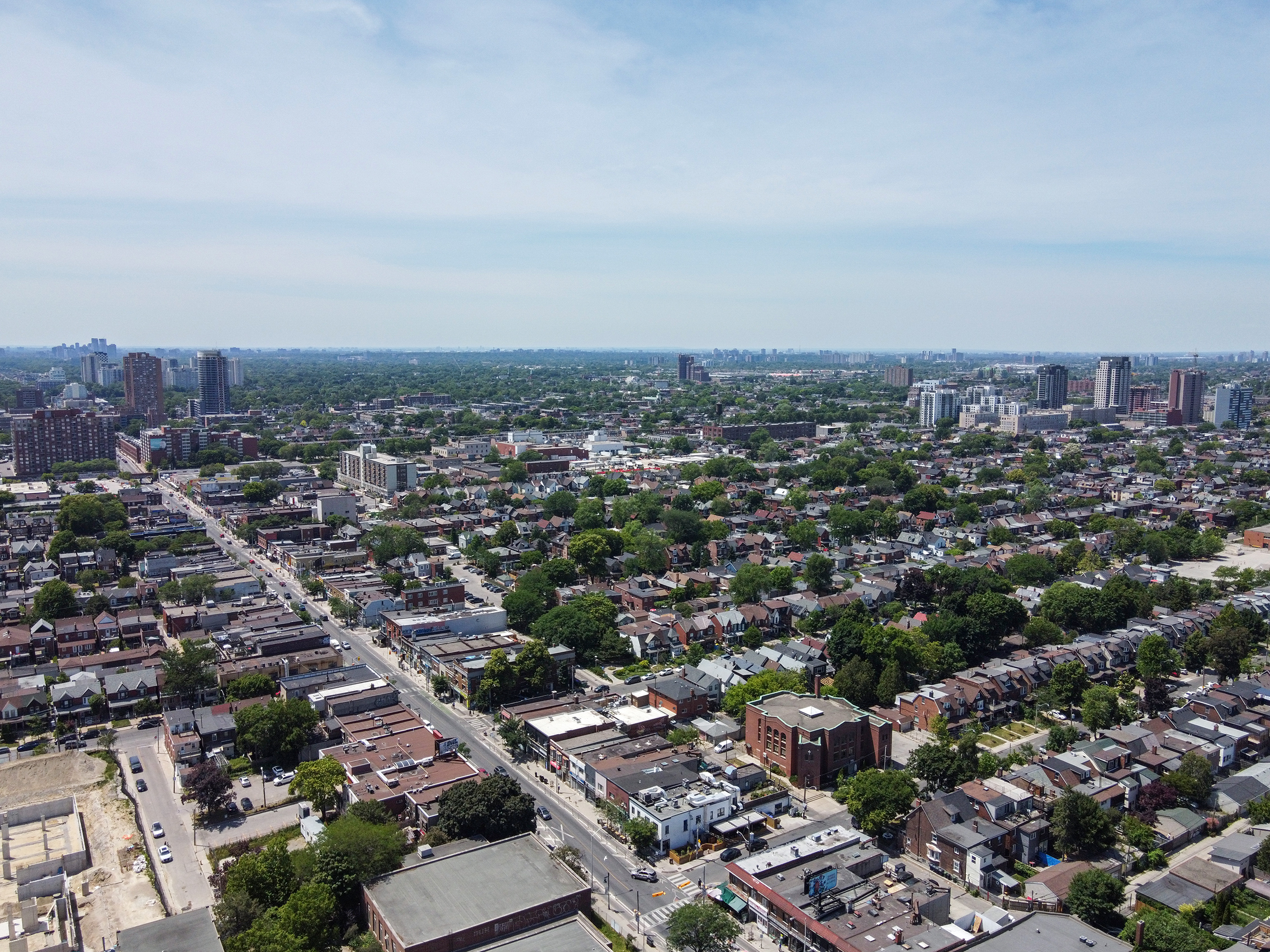
- Aerial view of Wallace Emerson from Bloor

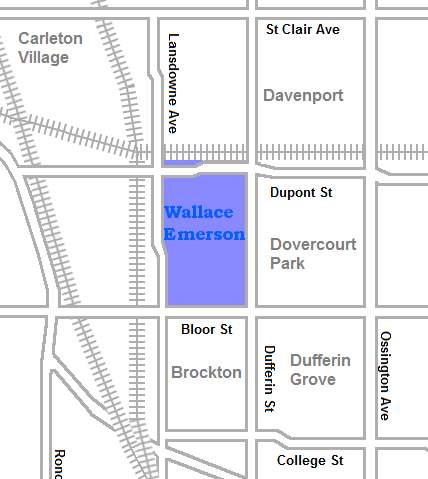

- Location within Toronto
- Coordinates: 43.663°N 79.441°W
- Country: Canada
- Province: Ontario
- City: Toronto

Government
  - City Councillor: Alejandra Bravo
  - Federal M.P.: Julie Dzerowicz (Davenport)
  - Provincial M.P.P.: Marit Stiles (Davenport)

Wallace Emerson is a neighbourhood in Toronto, Ontario, Canada situated north of Bloor Street between Dufferin Street to the east, the CPR railway lines to the north and the CPR railway lines to the west.

The neighbourhood derives its name from the intersection of Wallace Avenue and Emerson Avenue near the centre of the community.

== Character ==
The neighbourhood contains a mixture of land uses. The main thoroughfare of Bloor Street consists almost exclusively of mixed-use residential and commercial buildings. The Bloordale Village BIA encompasses the stretch from Lansdowne to Dufferin.

The residential area north of Bloor Street is primarily single-family dwellings. Many of these structures have been converted into apartments, housing up to eight separate units.

To the north, between Dupont and Davenport, is mainly post-industrial development. Limited manufacturing remains, although some warehouse and light automotive industries still exist. While the Canadian Pacific Railway operates a main line between the two thoroughfares, a large amount of former industrial space has been converted to loft condominia. Some single-family rowhouses and low-income rental space has also been created.

The largest shopping centre within the Wallace Emerson boundaries is the Galleria Mall, which opened in 1972.

== Demographics ==
For city demographics purposes the area is amalgamated with neighbouring areas to form Dovercourt-Wallace Emerson-Junction. It is an ethnically diverse area. A majority of residents are fluent in Portuguese, Italian and English. A large Ethiopian population is also present in the area. There are many shops along Bloor Street serving the Portuguese and Ethiopian communities.

As of 2016, Junction-Wallace Emerson had a population of 23,586. The neighbourhood's population grew by 10% between 2011 and 2016.

Major ethnic populations (2016):

- 62.9% European; 25.2% British, 21.9% Portuguese, 11.4% Irish
- 7.3% Black; 2.1% Jamaican
- 7.1% South Asian; 4.9% East Indian
- 6.9% Chinese

== Schools ==
Secular English-oriented public schools in Wallace Emerson are operated by the Toronto District School Board (TDSB) while public separate schools are operated by the Toronto Catholic District School Board (TCDSB). Public schools located in Wallace Emerson that are operated by these school boards include:

- St. Sebastian, a TCDSB elementary school on Brock Avenue, north-west of Bloor and Dufferin.
- Pauline Junior Public School is a TDSB elementary school on Pauline Avenue, north-east of Bloor and Pauline.

In addition to the Toronto District School Board, two other publicly funded school boards operate in the City of Toronto, the secular French-oriented Conseil scolaire Viamonde, and the French-oriented separate school board Conseil scolaire catholique MonAvenir. However, the two French school boards do not operate a school in Wallace Emerson.

== Transportation ==
Lansdowne and Dufferin stations on the Bloor–Danforth line serve the neighbourhood. The Dufferin bus runs north-south from Dufferin station.

== See also ==
- Bloordale Village
- Canadian Aeroplanes Ltd.
