= Bloordale Village =

Human settlement in Ontario, Canada

Coordinates: 43.659°N 79.439°W

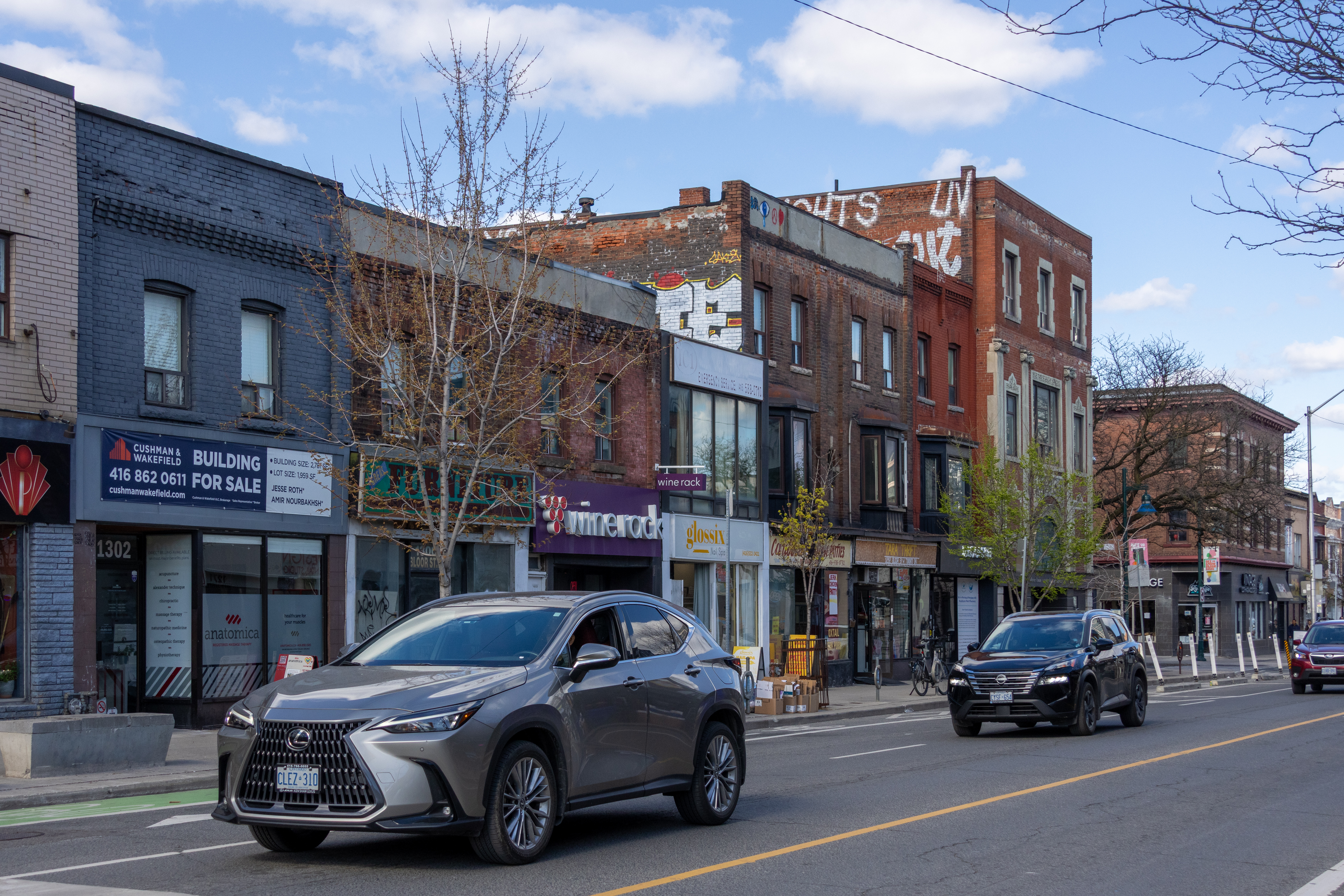
- Interactive map of Bloordale Village
- Country: Canada
- Province: Ontario
- City: Toronto
- Founded: 1976

Government
  - Toronto City Councillor: Alejandra Bravo
- Time zone: UTC-05:00 (EST)
  - Summer (DST): UTC-04:00 (EDT)

Bloordale Village is a Business Improvement Area (BIA) located along Bloor Street from Dufferin Street to Lansdowne Avenue, west of downtown in Toronto, Ontario, Canada. It sits on the southern border of the Wallace Emerson neighbourhood and the northern border of the Brockton Village neighbourhood. The district is home to various and unique shops including restaurants, bars, vintage and thrift stores. Bloordale Village should not be confused to a similarly named neighbourhood Bloordale Garden, located in the former city of Etobicoke, Ontario, west of Highway 427, and bounded roughly by Rathburn Road, the Elmcrest Creek, and Dundas St.

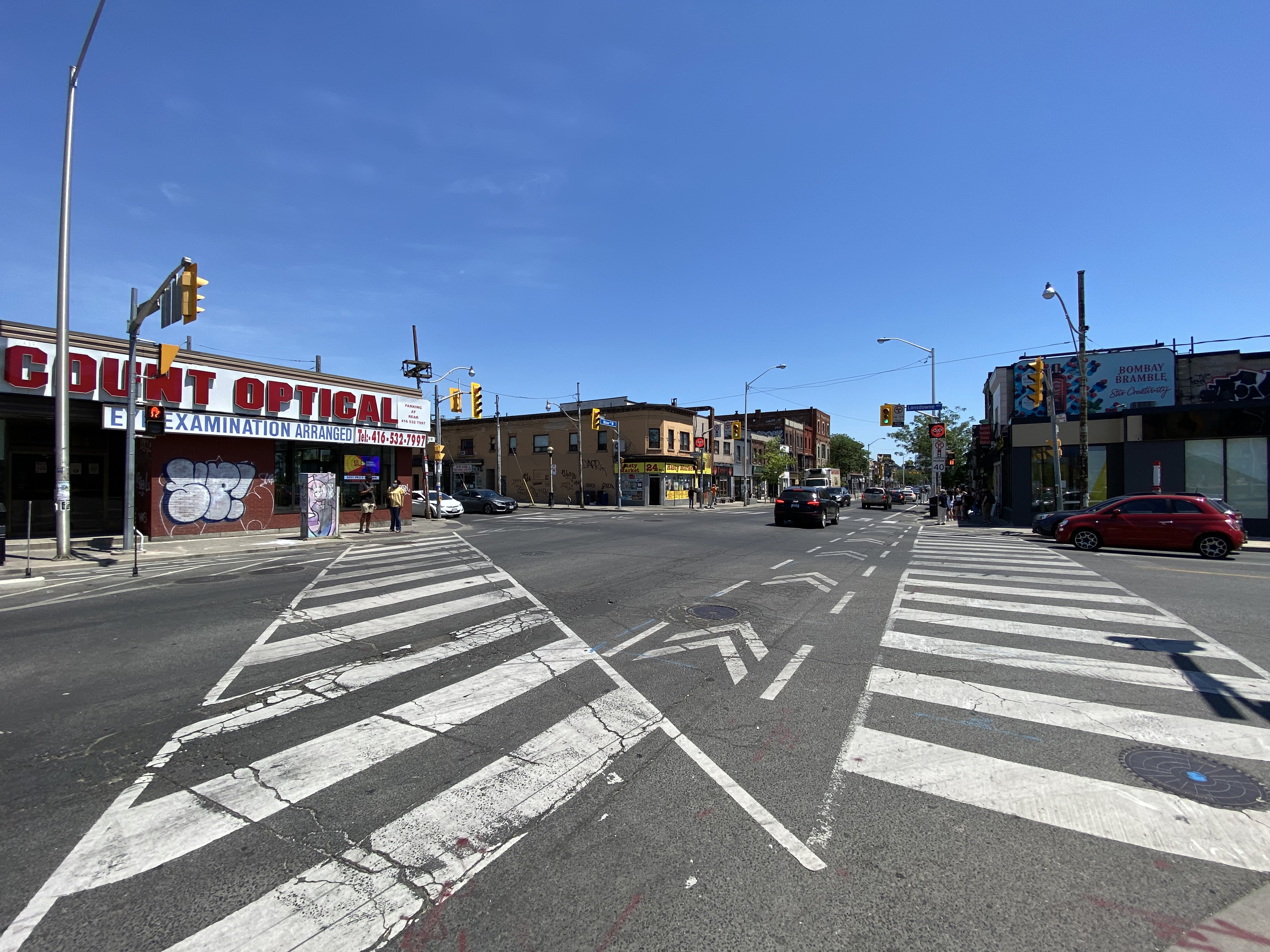
Lansdowne Ave at Bloor St West in 2022 Facing west (towards Lansdowne) on Bloor St. in 2006

== Character ==
Bloordale Village (commonly known as Bloordale) has undergone significant change since 2010, and was once considered one of Toronto's 'up and coming' art districts. The surrounding area is a highly diverse, mixed-income community. A mix of Portuguese, Caribbean, Italian, Bangladeshi, Latin American, Pakistani, Sri Lankan, Chinese, and Vietnamese populations are found in the neighbourhood. At one point in time, at a local primary school, 81 per cent of students speak a native language other than English. The area has been gentrifying since the late 2000s, so since then, this mix of ethnicities has changed.

=== Bloordale Improvement Area and Associations ===
The Bloordale BIA was founded in 1976 and celebrated its 40th anniversary in 2016. The former head of the BIA was the owner of House of Lancaster, a strip club in the area. On October 23, 2013 the Bloordale Community Improvement Association was formed. They've organized neighbourhood clean-ups and garage sales.

=== Bloordale Beach ===
Between May 2020 and September 2021, the unused grounds of Brockton High School was taken over by local artist Shari Kasman and an anonymous collaborator and turned into a combination guerrilla art installation and informal community hub that was known as Bloordale Beach.
