= Galleria Shopping Centre (Toronto) =

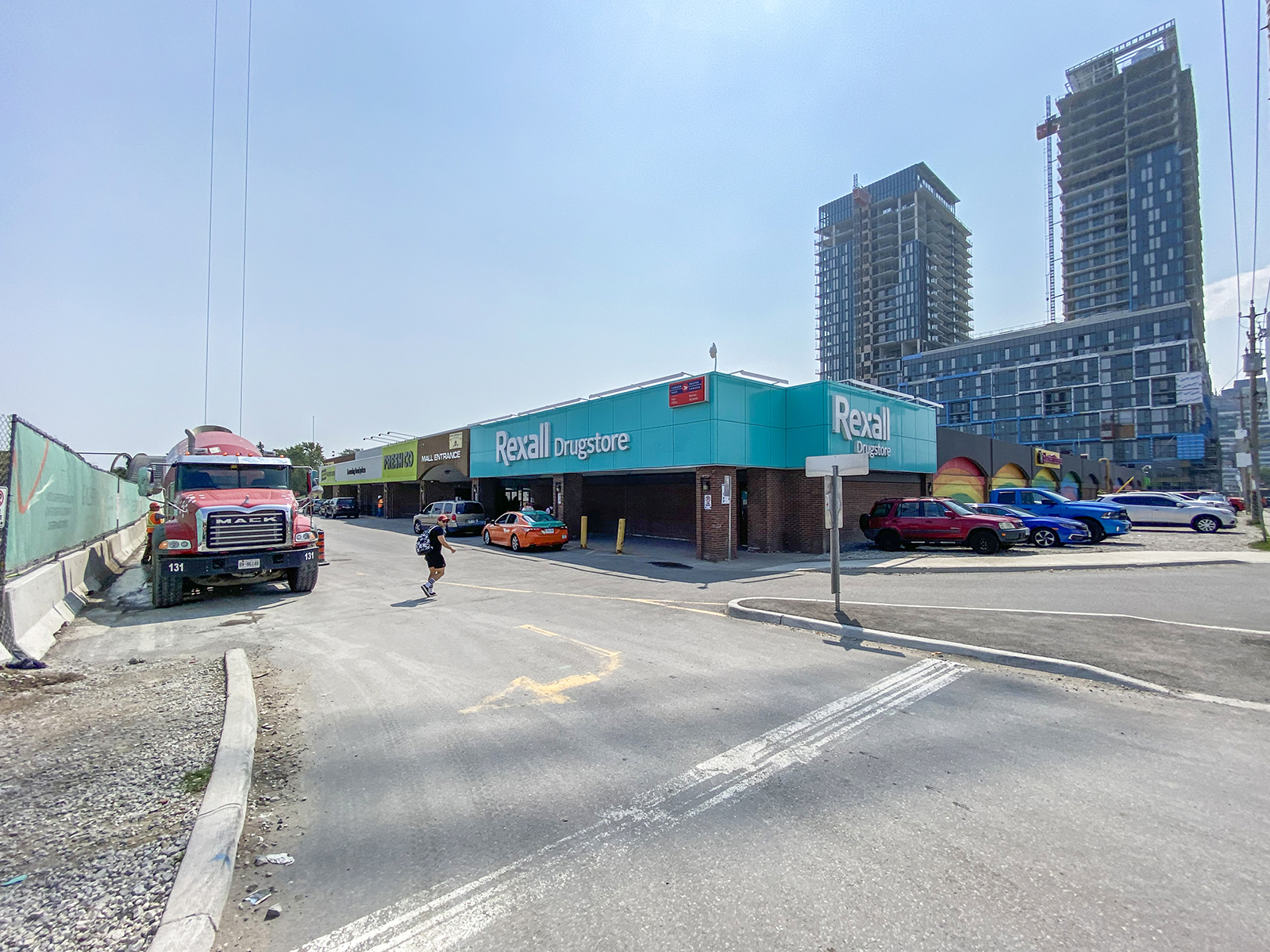
- Galleria Shopping Centre in 2023
- Location: Toronto, Ontario, Canada
- Coordinates: 43.6675°N 79.442°W
- Address: 1245 Dupont Street
- Opened: 1972
- Closed: 2020 (indoor only)
- Owner: Freed Developments
- Num. of stores: 40+ (including kiosks)
- Num. of anchor tenants: 3
- Floor area: 21,124 m^{2} (227,380 sq ft)
- Floors: 1
- Website: galleriashoppingcentre.ca

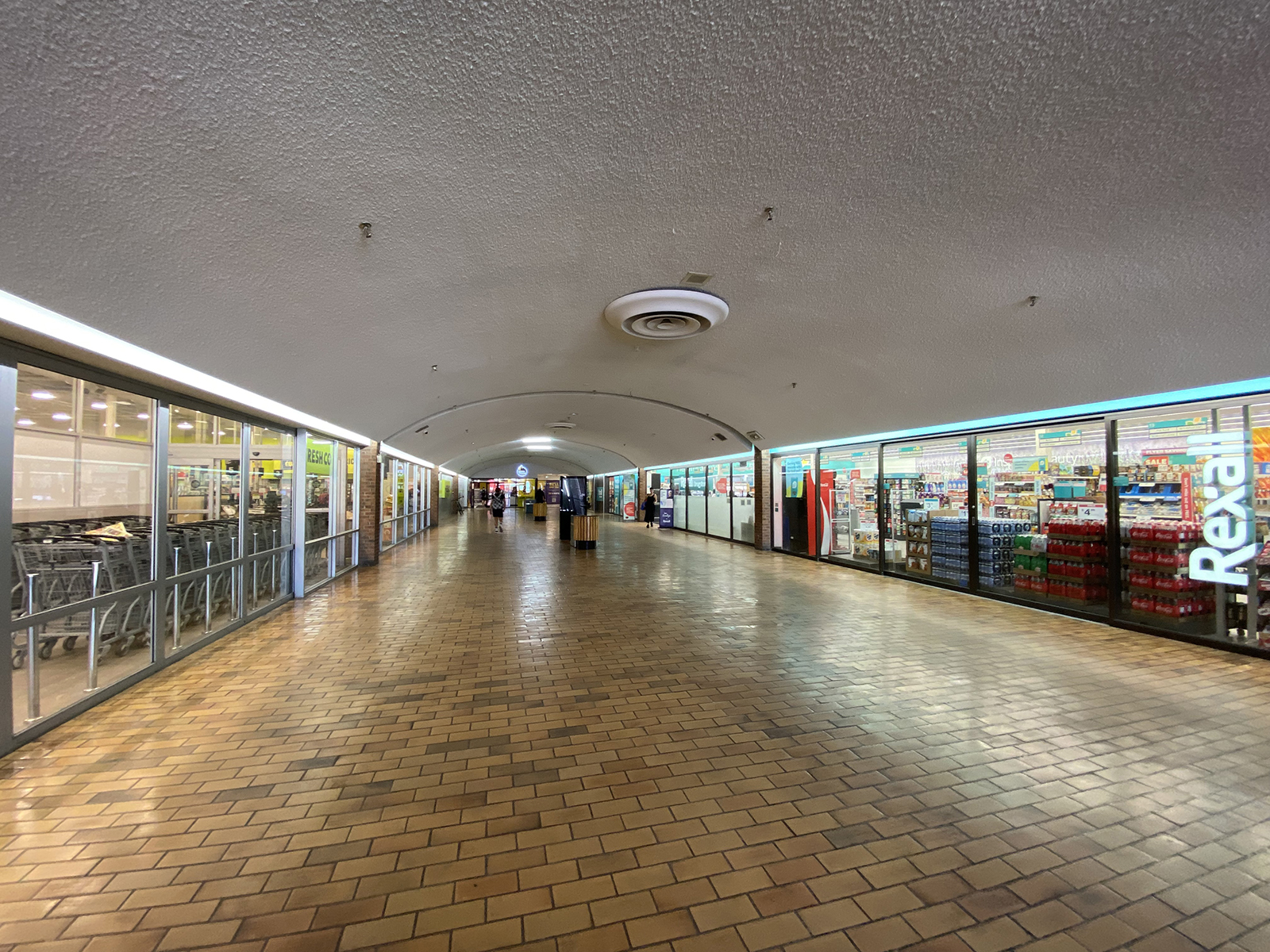
Galleria Shopping Centre existing access

The Galleria Shopping Centre (more commonly known as Galleria Mall) is a shopping centre in Toronto, Ontario, Canada. It is located at the southwest corner of the intersection of Dufferin and Dupont Streets. The mall is in the process of being redeveloped into a mixed-use development. As it is in process of being demolished, only half of the building remains.

The shopping centre was a single storey, enclosed (one of only three enclosed shopping centres in the former City of Toronto), and had approximately 50 tenants. It opened in 1972 and had an area of 21,124 m^{2} (227,380 sq ft). In August 2015 the mall was sold to Freed Developments and ELAD Canada. In September 2019, ELAD took control of the entire project. The site is now undergoing redevelopment.

The stores that remain in the portion of the mall left standing include FreshCo supermarket (formerly Price Chopper), Rexall, Planet Fitness, TD Bank, F45 Training and PetValu. For about two decades the mall was home to a Zellers discount department store. The Dollarama store closed in 2020 and the standalone McDonald's immediately adjacent to Dufferin Street is actually an outparcel tenant of the centre; it was demolished in 2022. Planet Fitness announced the opening of a 20,000-square-foot (1,900 m^{2}) gym and fitness centre at the mall in December 2014. It was their first Canadian location.

The mall had faced concerns over store closures, depressed footfall, and outdated decor with questions raised over its viability. Shari Kasman made two photobooks about the mall: “Galleria: The Mall That Time Forgot” (2018) and an abridged version called “Goodbye, Galleria” (2019).

== Location and site ==
Dominion Radiator Company had a plant on the site from at least 1910 and onwards. The site is large and was once a Curtiss Aircraft/Canadian Aeroplanes plant during World War I 1917-1919, sold to Columbia Graphophone, then as Dodge Brothers (1925) and later Chrysler (1928) car plant.

The shopping centre is located the intersection of Dufferin Street, a major Toronto north/south artery, and Dupont Street. It is halfway between the Annex neighbourhood and the Junction in the Wallace Emerson neighbourhood of west-central Toronto. The shopping centre sits on about 12 acres (4.9 ha) of land. Areas to the east and west include high rise residential amidst houses. The mall has served as an important community hub.

The mall's site has been termed a "greyfield"—a large, developed urban site that is ripe for redevelopment. Extensive discussion was undertaken in the early 2000s about demolishing the mall to make way for as many as six residential condo towers. Approvals were granted in 2004. However, a mixture of tenancy issues and resident concerns brought a halt to the plans.

Plans for development began in 2015 when the property was sold to ELAD Canada and Freed Developments. Eight towers between 19 and 35 stories will be erected on the site in addition to a park which will expand onto the existing parkland adjacent to the mall. While the current mall will be demolished new retail and office space will be added to podium below residential towers. The project is set to be complete by the year 2030.

== Anchors ==
- Planet Fitness - some of its space was formerly occupied by Zellers
- FreshCo - formerly Price Chopper and Food City respectively
- PetValu
- Rexall
- TD Bank

=== Former anchors ===
- Zellers - previously Towers; closed 2012
- Towers - closed 1991
- Price Chopper - rebranded as FreshCo in 2010
- Food City - now Price Chopper (FreshCo)
