= Canadian Aeroplanes =

Coordinates: 43.667810°N 79.441552°W

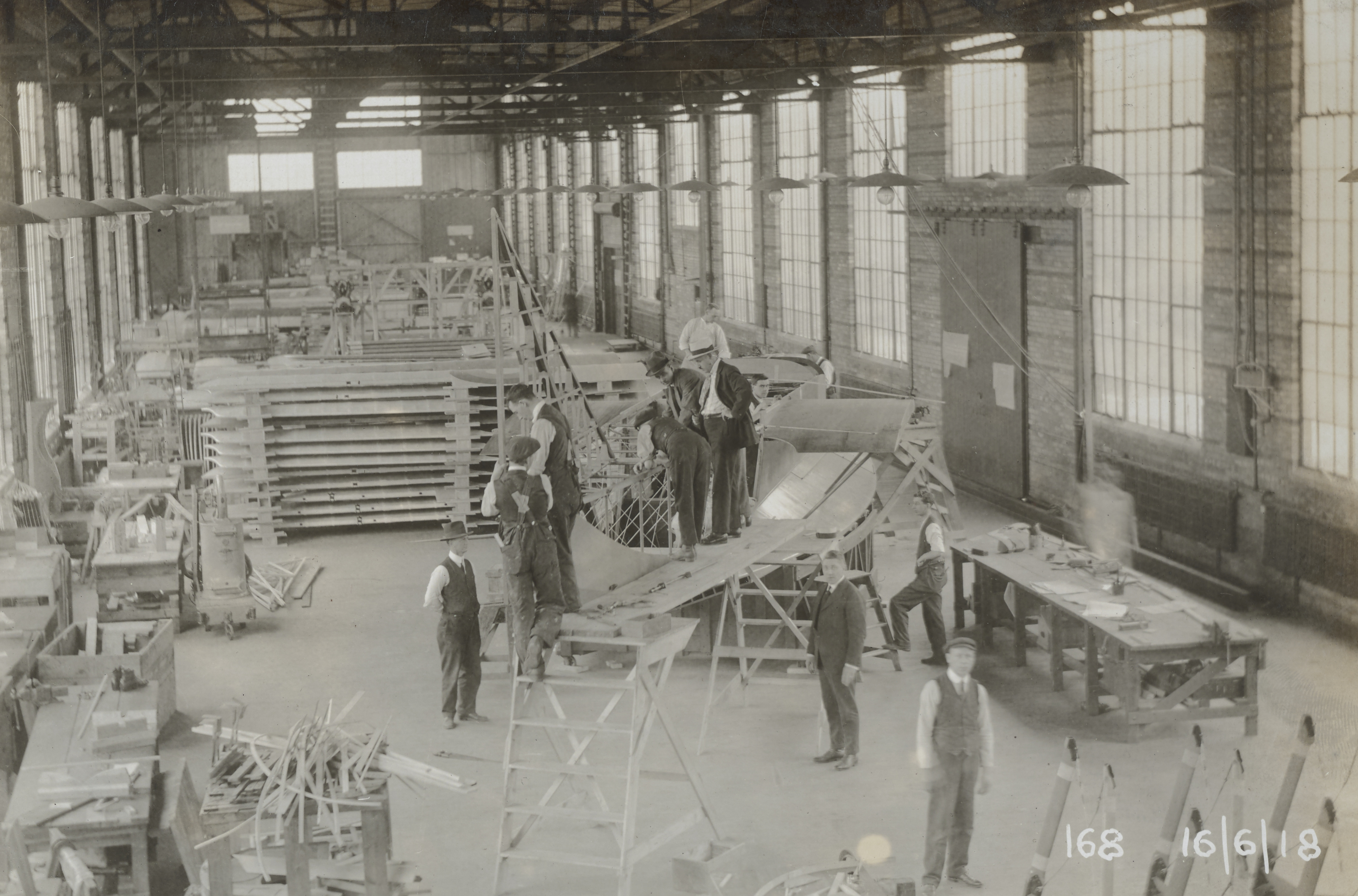
- Factory in 1918
- Industry: Commercial aviation
- Founded: December 15, 1916; 108 years ago
- Defunct: 1919
- Fate: Purchased by Columbia Graphophone Company Limited
- Headquarters: Toronto, Ontario, Canada

Canadian Aeroplanes Ltd. was an aircraft manufacturing company located in Toronto, Ontario, Canada that built aircraft for the Royal Flying Corps Canada during the First World War.

Formed on December 15, 1916, when the Imperial Munitions Board bought the Curtiss (Canada) aircraft operation in Toronto (opened in 1916 as Toronto Curtiss Aeroplanes) at a 6-acre facility at 1244 Dufferin Street south of Dupont Avenue in April 1917.

The public company was run by Sir Frank Wilton Baillie, an industrialist and financier.

Canadian Aeroplanes Ltd. manufactured the JN-4(Can) Canuck (1200), the Felixstowe F5L flying boat (30), and the Avro 504.

The plant remained opened until after the Armistice and was sold to Columbia Graphophone Company Limited in 1919. After 1924 it was sold to Dodge Brothers Canada Limited as a car assembly plant till 1928.

The industrial site was re-developed in the 1970s as the Galleria Shopping Centre and Wallace-Emerson Community Centre. The south side of the property is lined with homes.
