= Lansdowne Avenue =

Thoroughfare in Toronto, Ontario

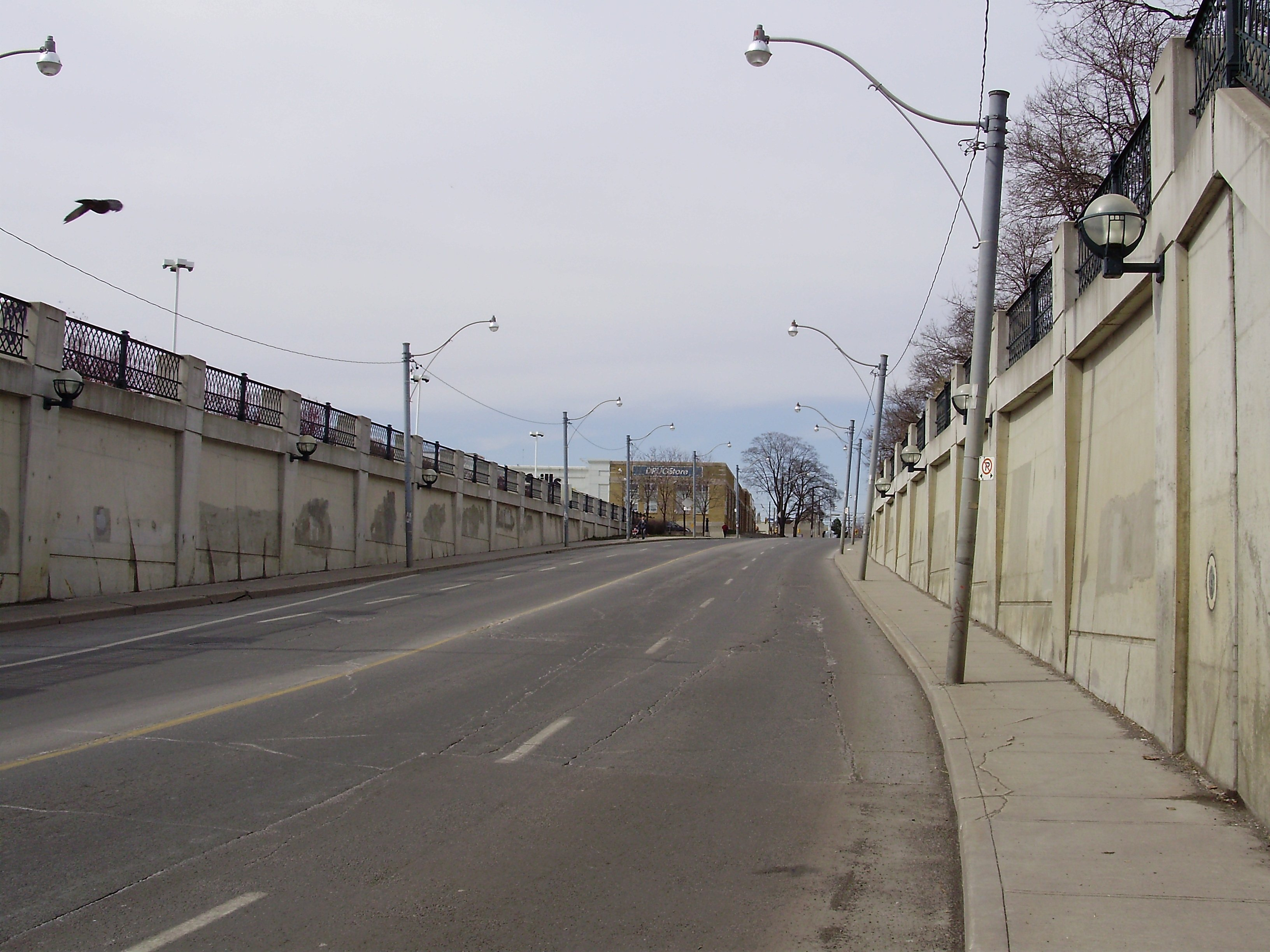
- Looking north along Lansdowne Avenue

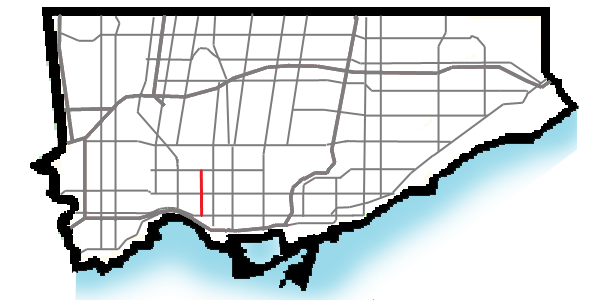
- Lansdowne Avenue in Toronto
- Maintained by: City of Toronto government
- Location: Toronto
- South end: Queen Street
- Major junctions: Dundas Street; Bloor Street; Dupont Street
- North end: St. Clair Avenue

Other
Nearby arterial roads in Toronto
← Roncesvalles Avenue	Dufferin Street →

Lansdowne Avenue is an arterial road in Toronto, Ontario. It runs north–south and starts at Queen Street West and proceeds north to St. Clair Avenue West. Lansdowne Avenue is primarily a four-lane arterial road, with two lanes regularly used for motor vehicle parking.

== Character ==
Lansdowne Avenue starts at Queen Street West as a four-lane road in the Parkdale neighbourhood. In the 2000s, the section from Queen to the CN/CPR tracks was narrowed for street calming. Both sides of the street are residential with some institutional uses, including a fire station, a park and a community centre. Starting at the rail tracks underpass, the roadway widens to four lanes. On the west side is a former cash register factory, which was converted to a Knob Hill Farms store until it went out of business in 2000. The building was mostly demolished, leaving only the eastern facade, and a large 'No Frills' supermarket was built in its place, which it remains today. On the east side are more semi-detached homes. The east side of the street is within the Little Portugal neighbourhood.

North of College Street, the street narrows again for street calming to two lanes until Bloor Street West. This stretch is completely residential on the east side, with École secondaire catholique Saint-Frère-André on the west side, a large high school. This area is within the Brockton Village neighbourhood. The Bloor Street stretch here is known as 'Bloordale Village.'

North of Bloor Street, the street is four lanes with parking, and is mixed uses of residential and retail storefronts until north of Lappin Avenue, and the cross-town CPR tracks, where a large former industrial area exists. The buildings along this stretch have been converted to loft-style buildings up to Davenport Road. This area is known as Dovercourt-Wallace Emerson-Junction.

North of Davenport, Lansdowne climbs a steep hill, which was the former Lake Iroquois shoreline. Along the west side is Earlscourt Park, and the roadway curves around and alongside the Park. From here north to St. Clair, both sides of the street are residential.

The main section of the street ends in the Corso Italia neighbourhood at St. Clair Avenue West, a major east–west thoroughfare. Across the intersection is Prospect Cemetery.

In the superblock between Eglinton and Lawrence, there are two small, disconnected sections of Lansdowne which are roughly in line with the southern alignment of the street. The southernmost of these two sections (from Wingold Avenue to Glengrove Avenue) is also mixed residential and industrial, while the northernmost of the two sections (Glenlong Avenue to Playfair Avenue) is only one block long, and completely residential.

== History ==
Lansdowne Avenue was built by the Village of Parkdale and named after the Marquis of Lansdowne, and Governor General of Canada in 1883. The section from to north of Dupont was laid out in 1888 and was named Mackenzie Avenue, after William Innes Mackenzie, the secretary of the Toronto House Building Association. The section to the south of Davenport was first named Jubilee, then Malvern, according to the 1890 Atlas of Toronto. The various sections were renamed to Lansdowne in 1910 when the area was annexed by Toronto. The section north of Davenport was built after 1890 and was built on the estate of Allan Royce. The estate became Earlscourt Park.

== Public transit ==
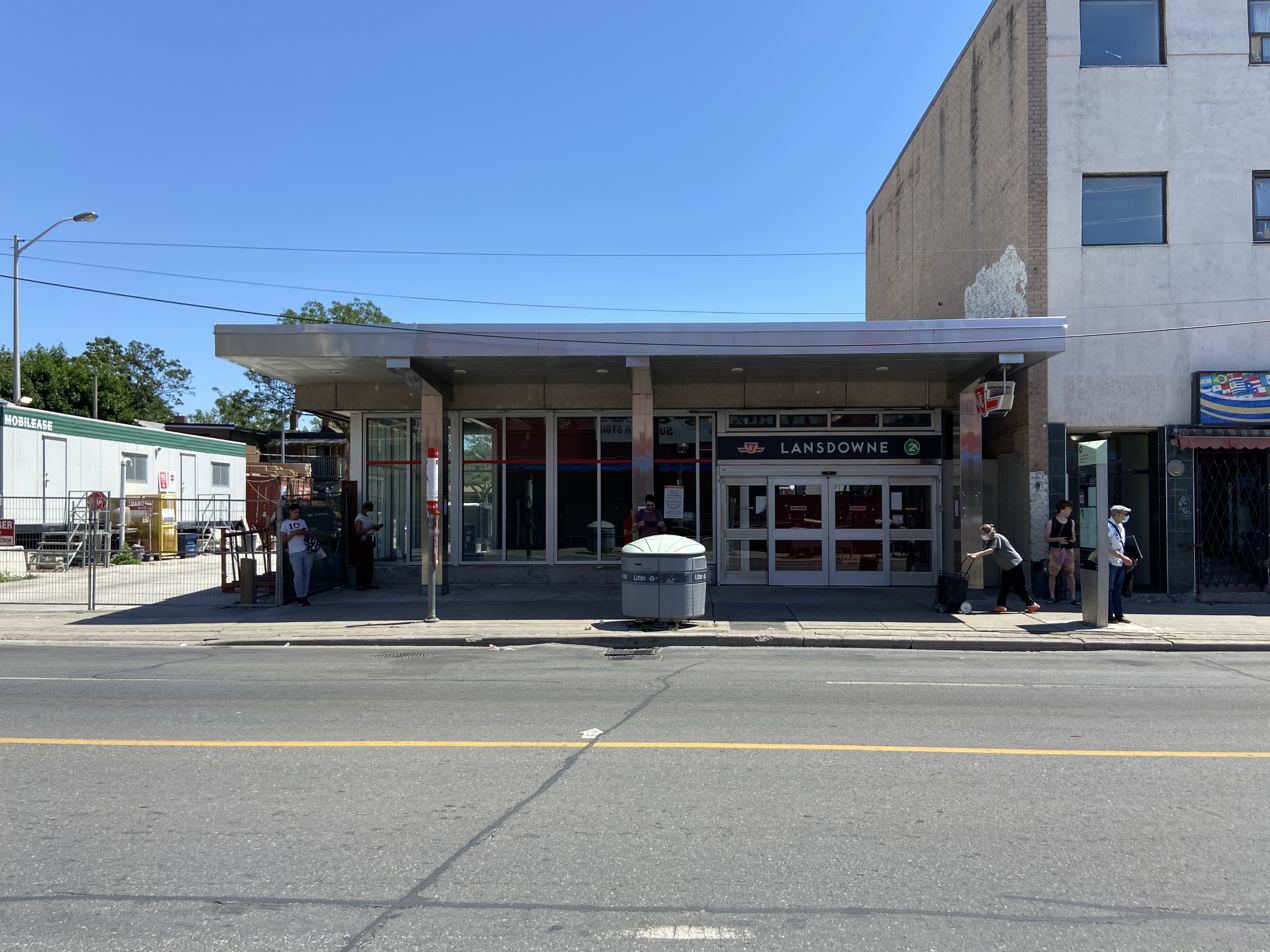
Lansdowne Station

Lansdowne Avenue is served by the 47 Lansdowne bus, which runs the length of Lansdowne Avenue, as well as along Caledonia Road to Yorkdale station. The Lansdowne station on the Bloor-Danforth TTC subway line is located on Lansdowne, just north of Bloor Street.

Streetcars used to operate on Lansdowne Avenue between St Clair Avenue West and Dundas Street West. In 1947, streetcars were replaced by trolley bus service. Trolley bus service was finally replaced by the existing 47 bus in 1992.
