= Shari Kasman =

Toronto artist and author

- Education: York University; McMaster University
- Occupations: Musician, visual artist, and writer

Shari Kasman is a multidisciplinary artist and writer based in her hometown, Toronto, Canada.

== Education ==
Kasman has a Bachelor of Fine Arts degree in music from York University and a diploma in Music Performance in classical piano from McMaster University.

== Career ==
In the 2010s, Kasman photographed and provided guided tours of Toronto's Galleria Mall. She created two photo books about the mall. Her related exhibit Memories of Galleria Mall was featured as part of the Scotiabank CONTACT Photography Festival in 2019.

In 2022, after failing to persuade the City of Toronto to address flooding in a bicycle lane on Bloor Street, Kasman named the location "Bloordale Pond". The same year, Kasman drew attention to the unused land on Brock Street, Toronto, by putting up unauthorised signs suggesting the location was "Parkdale Provincial Park".

Kasman's work provides commentary on the issues within Toronto, such as public transit, alcohol consumption in public parks, and vandalism.

Kasman is also a frequent contributor to the West End Phoenix, a local newspaper in Toronto.

== Books ==
- Everything Life Has to Offer, Invisible Publishing, 2016, ISBN 9781926743844
- Galleria: The Mall That Time Forgot, Salted Pepper Projects, 2018, ISBN 9781999483302
- Goodbye, Galleria, Salted Pepper Projects, 2019, ISBN 9781999483319
- Rocks Don't Move and Other Questionable Facts, Salted Pepper Projects, 2021, ISBN 9781999483326
