= Corso Italia (Toronto) =

- Neighbourhood
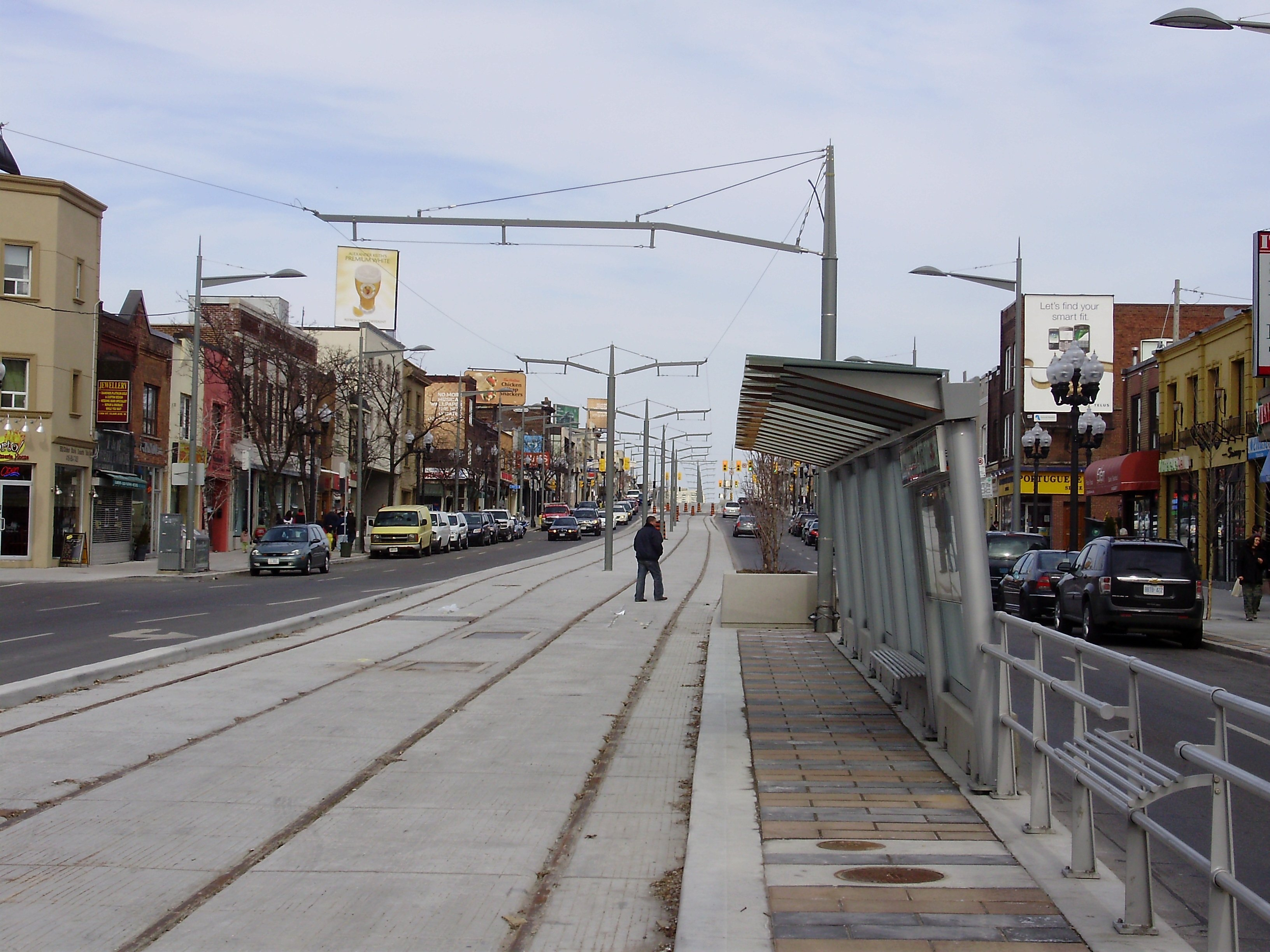
- Looking east on St. Clair Avenue West in Corso Italia in 2009 with the nearly completed streetcar right-of-way in the centre

- Location within Toronto
- Coordinates: 43.677°N 79.445°W
- Country: Canada
- Province: Ontario
- City: Toronto

Corso Italia is a neighbourhood in Toronto, Ontario, Canada, situated on St. Clair Avenue West, between Westmount Avenue (just east of Dufferin Street) and Lansdowne Avenue. It is contained within the larger city-recognized neighbourhood of Corso Italia-Davenport.

The neighbourhood includes numerous cafés, clothing shops, shoe stores, restaurants, food markets, as well as several gelaterias and bakeries. The community is considered Toronto's second Italian ethnic enclave after Little Italy on College Street. There is also a significant Latin American and Portuguese community in the area.

== History ==
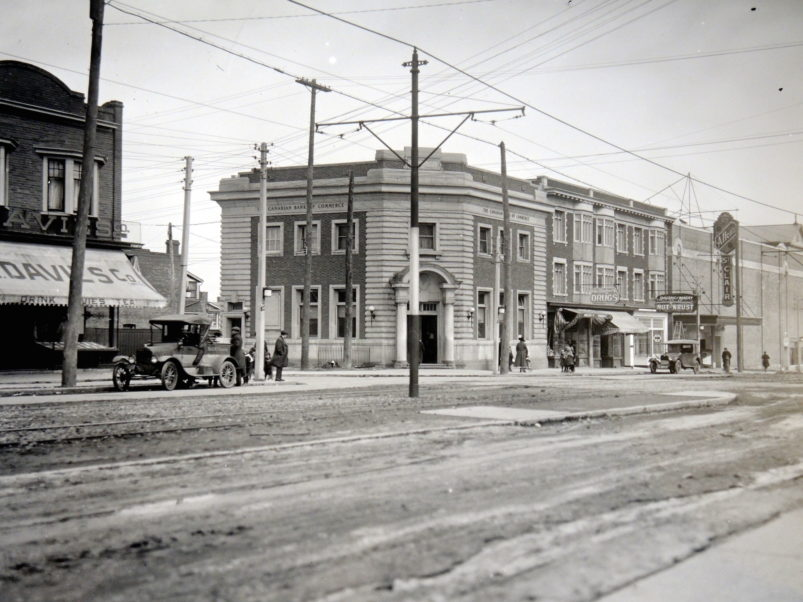
Corso Italia from Dufferin Street and St. Clair Avenue. The first Europeans were British settlers in the 1900s.

The community is the eastern half of what was earlier known as Earlscourt. Earlscourt was originally settled by British immigrants in 1906, and was annexed by the City of Toronto in 1910.

By the 1970s, Italian immigrants from Little Italy on College Street, moved northward to St. Clair Avenue. One of the largest celebrations on St. Clair Avenue West was when Italy won the 1982 FIFA World Cup, which involved an estimated 300,000 fans, shutting the street down for nearly 20 blocks between Caledonia and Oakwood. In 1981, about 35,000 Italians lived in this area, however, by 1991, this number had dropped to 20,000. Although the character of Corso Italia is still Italian, the demographics of this neighbourhood have changed drastically with a smaller Italian population than originally. Much of the Italian population has moved to the suburbs northwest of Toronto, in particular, Vaughan, King, and Caledon.

Corso Italia was a Business Improvement Area (BIA) in Toronto in 1984.

== See also ==
- Little Italy, Toronto
- Italian Canadians
- Italians in Toronto
