= Joseph Bloor =

Canadian businessman

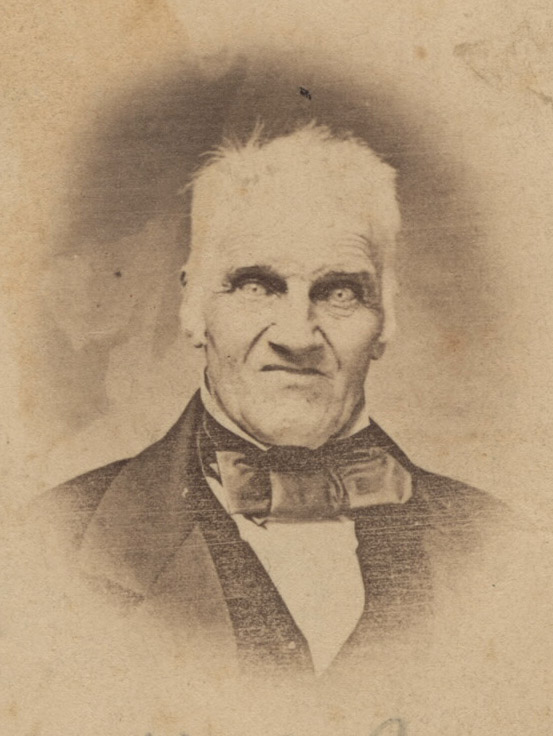
- Bloor c. 1850
- Born: 1789; Staffordshire, England
- Died: 1862 (aged 72–73); Toronto, Ontario, Canada
- Occupation: Innkeeper

Joseph Bloor (or Bloore) (1789–1862) was an innkeeper, brewer, and land speculator in the 19th century who founded the Village of Yorkville and is the namesake for Toronto's Bloor Street. Originally from Staffordshire, England, he emigrated to Canada in 1819 and eventually moved to the village of York, Upper Canada (later Toronto) with his wife Sarah (née Lees) and three children, where he became a prominent early figure.

Bloor kept a hotel, Farmer's Arms Inn, at 157 King Street East (now home to St. Lawrence Hall) from 1824 to 1831 and built a brewery in 1830 in the Rosedale Valley, near Sherbourne Street.

He sold the brewery in 1843 (John Rose operated it as Castle Frank Brewery until 1864 and the building was demolished by 1875), and purchased a stretch of land in nearby Yorkville, where he and William Botsford Jarvis laid out streets for residential development.

The boundary of Yorkville and Toronto, which had been called Second Concession Road, St. Paul's Road, Sydenham Road, and Toll Gate Road, was named Bloor Street in his honour in 1855. Bloor died at his home at 121 Bloor Street East, now demolished near Bloor and Church Street. A plaque commemorating his life can be found in St. Andrew's United Church on Bloor Street East.

He is buried at Necropolis Cemetery on Winchester Street in Cabbagetown.

While his tombstone, and those of his descendants, spell the family name "Bloore", this was a posthumous development. Period references such as city directories, tax assessment rolls and biographical publications all spell his name without an "e".

== The local notoriety of Joseph Bloor's portrait ==
A billboard in the Bloor-Yorkville BIA on June 14, 1990, with the 1850s portrait of Joseph Bloor.

The mid-19th century image of Joseph Bloor has gained contemporary notoriety due to its unsettling appearance. For example, in the 1990s, the advertising campaign by the Bloor-Yorkville Business Improvement Area (BIA) prominently featured the portrait of Bloor alongside the slogan “I’ve got what no mall’s got.”

Although the campaign was short-lived, the image has resurfaced in online discussions, local history articles, and social media, often cited as one of Toronto’s most memorable and unsettling historical images.
