= Bloor Street =

Arterial street in Toronto

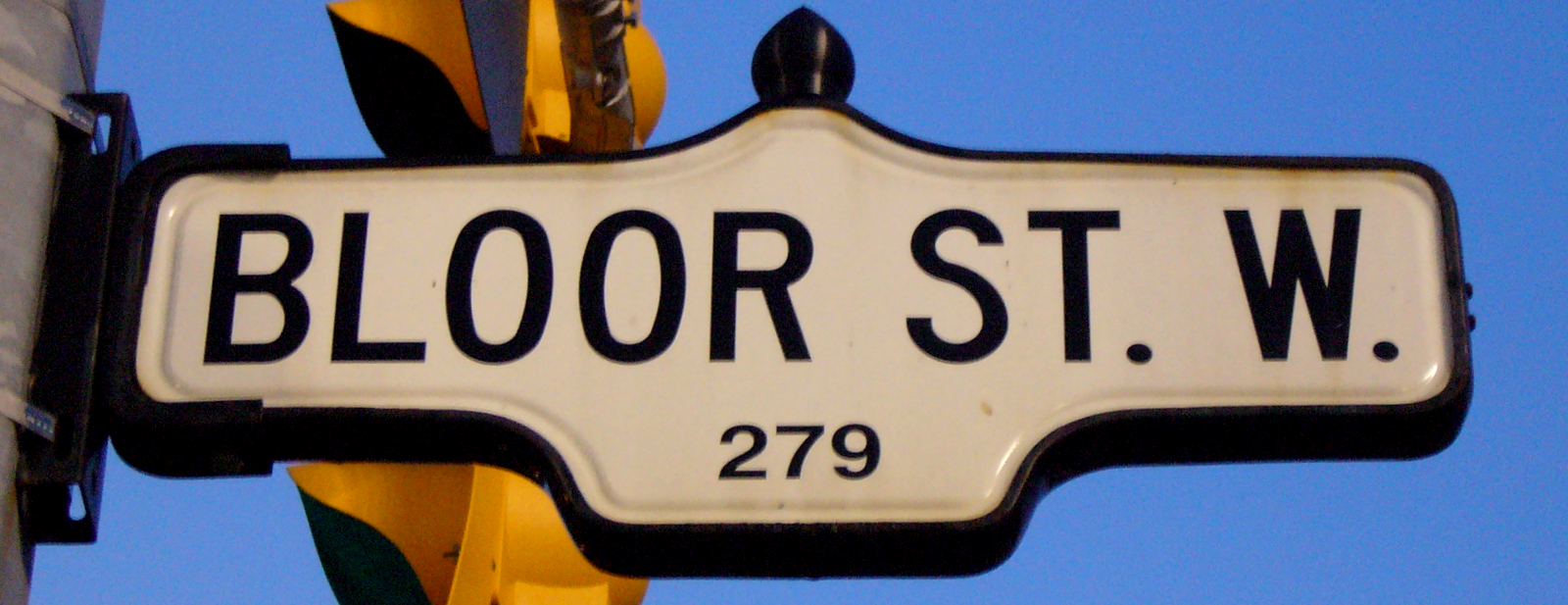
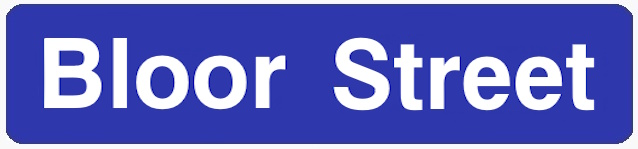

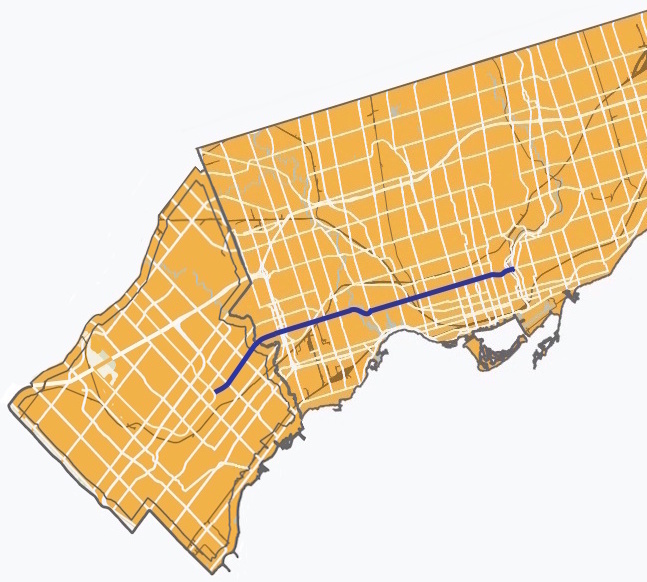
- Route of Bloor Street through Toronto and Mississauga (blue line)
- Interactive map of Bloor Street
- Namesake: Joseph Bloor
- Location: Toronto; Mississauga
- Coordinates: 43°40′13″N 79°23′12″W
- West end: Central Parkway
- Major junctions: Cawthra Road; Dixie Road; The West Mall; The East Mall; Dundas Street (1); Kipling Avenue; Islington Avenue; Jane Street; Keele Street; Dundas Street (2) (To Roncesvalles Avenue); Dufferin Street; Bathurst Street; Spadina Avenue; Avenue Road / Queen's Park; Bay Street; Yonge Street; Parliament Street; Don Valley Parkway
- East end: Don River (continues as Danforth Avenue)

Other
Nearby arterial roads
← Dundas Street; College Street / Carlton Street	Burnhamthorpe Road; St. Clair Avenue →

Bloor Street is an east–west arterial street in Toronto, Ontario, Canada. Bloor Street runs from the Prince Edward Viaduct, which spans the Don River Valley, westward into Mississauga where it ends at Central Parkway. East of the viaduct, Danforth Avenue continues along the same right-of-way. The street, approximately 25 kilometres (16 mi) long, contains a significant cross-sample of Toronto's ethnic communities. It is also home to Toronto's famous shopping street, the Mink Mile.

A portion of Line 2 of the Bloor-Danforth subway line runs along Bloor from Kipling Avenue to the Don Valley Parkway, and then continues east along Danforth Avenue.

== History ==
Originally surveyed as the first concession road north of the baseline (then Lot Street, now Queen Street), it was known by many names, including the Tollgate Road (as the first tollgate on Yonge north of Lot Street was constructed there in 1820) then St. Paul's Road (after the nearby church, constructed 1842). From 1844 until 1854 it was known as Sydenham Road after Lord Sydenham, Governor General of Canada 1839–1841. The street was then given its current name in honour of Joseph Bloor, a local brewer and land speculator who founded the Village of Yorkville in 1830 on the north side of this street and who was one of the street's original residents.

Sections of Bloor Street near High Park was still undeveloped in the early part of the 20th Century. Sections along High Park required infill to eliminate the natural deep valleys in the area. On the eastern terminus Bloor ended at Sherbourne Avenue at Rosedale Valley and where once the Sherbourne Blockhouse stood. A small footpath from Howard Street was the only means to reach the eastern end of the valley to continue along Danforth Avenue until the Prince Edward Viaduct was completed in 1918.

The street formerly ended at a dead end west of Highway 27 (now Highway 427), but was extended west in the early 1960s with the development of the Markland Wood neighbourhood. The Mississauga portion was constructed beginning in the mid-1960s, although the street was not bridged over the Etobicoke Creek (the present Mississauga/Toronto boundary) until 1971.

== Route description ==
Bloor street begins at the eastern edge of the Prince Edward Viaduct, which crosses the deep and wide valley of the Don River. The street continues through to the Rosedale Ravine, marking the southern border of the affluent community of Rosedale. West of Parliament Street, the street passes just to the north of the large St. James Town housing project, which stretches west to Sherbourne Street. On the northern side of this section of Bloor are the forested slopes of the Rosedale Ravine. Between Sherbourne and Church Streets the street is lined by large office towers, mostly home to insurance companies. This area has long been the centre of the insurance industry in Canada.

West of Church the street becomes more commercial and is an important shopping district. In downtown, especially around the intersection with Bay Street, Bloor is one of the most exclusive stretches of real estate in Canada. Rents on the upscale Bloor Street have doubled in 4 years, ranking as the 22nd most expensive retail location in the world in 2006, up two spots from 2005. Nationally, Vancouver's upscale Robson Street tied with Bloor Street West as the most expensive street in Canada, with an annual average rental price of $208 per square foot.

Under the intersection of Yonge and Bloor Streets is the Bloor–Yonge subway station, which is the busiest in the city, serving approximately 368,800 people a day. Above ground, the intersection encompasses commercial stores and condominiums. The stretch of Bloor between Yonge and Avenue Road, in Yorkville, is called Mink Mile, and it is the most prestigious shopping street in Toronto.

In the downtown, Bloor Street serves as the northern edge of the University of Toronto's St. George campus, and is host to several historic sites, including the Bata Shoe Museum, the Royal Conservatory of Music, the Royal Ontario Museum (ROM), and the southern edge of Yorkville, in an area now known as the Bloor Street Culture Corridor.

West of the university, which extends to Spadina Avenue, Bloor Street runs through a diverse series of neighbourhoods such as The Annex, Koreatown, Dufferin Grove, Brockton, Roncesvalles, High Park and Runnymede. It generally retains its commercial character, and serves as the main shopping area for most of these communities. Numerous sections of the street have named 'business improvement areas' such as Bloorcourt Village, Bloordale Village and Bloor West Village.

In Toronto's west end, Bloor Street criss-crosses Dundas Street twice, between Lansdowne Avenue and Keele Street and again in the "Six Points" area of Islington–City Centre West near Kipling Avenue. Markland Wood is the westernmost residential community in the city of Toronto. Through Mississauga, Bloor Street runs through the residential neighbourhoods of Applewood and Mississauga Valleys, and terminates at Central Parkway, about one kilometre east of Hurontario Street. Central Parkway itself has a 90° east-west to north–south bend at the terminus of Bloor Street, with the east–west leg effectively continuing its course westerly as far as Erindale Station Road, where it curves back north.

Until 1998, Bloor Street was designated as Highway 5 from Kipling Avenue east to the Don River. Like many urban stretches of provincial highways, it was formally decommissioned as a connecting link (meaning it was already under municipal jurisdiction) that year.

Construction began in 2019 by the City of Toronto to reconfigure the interchange at Kipling Avenue and Dundas Street into an at-grade intersection. This removed the "Spaghetti Junction" created in 1961 and renamed Dunbloor Road as Dundas Street to reconnect the broken sections.

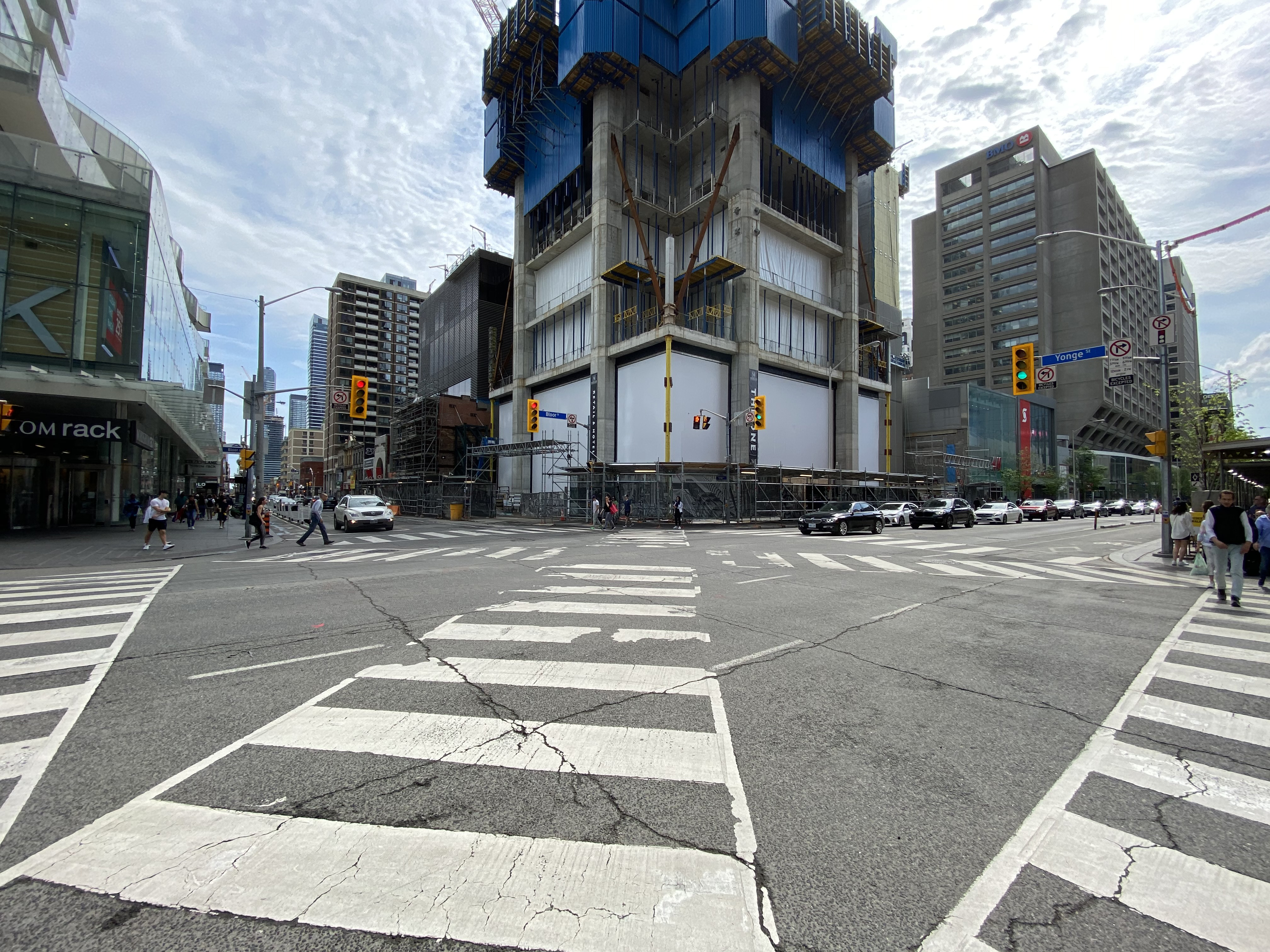
The intersection of Yonge Street and Bloor Street, two of Toronto's most prominent thoroughfares

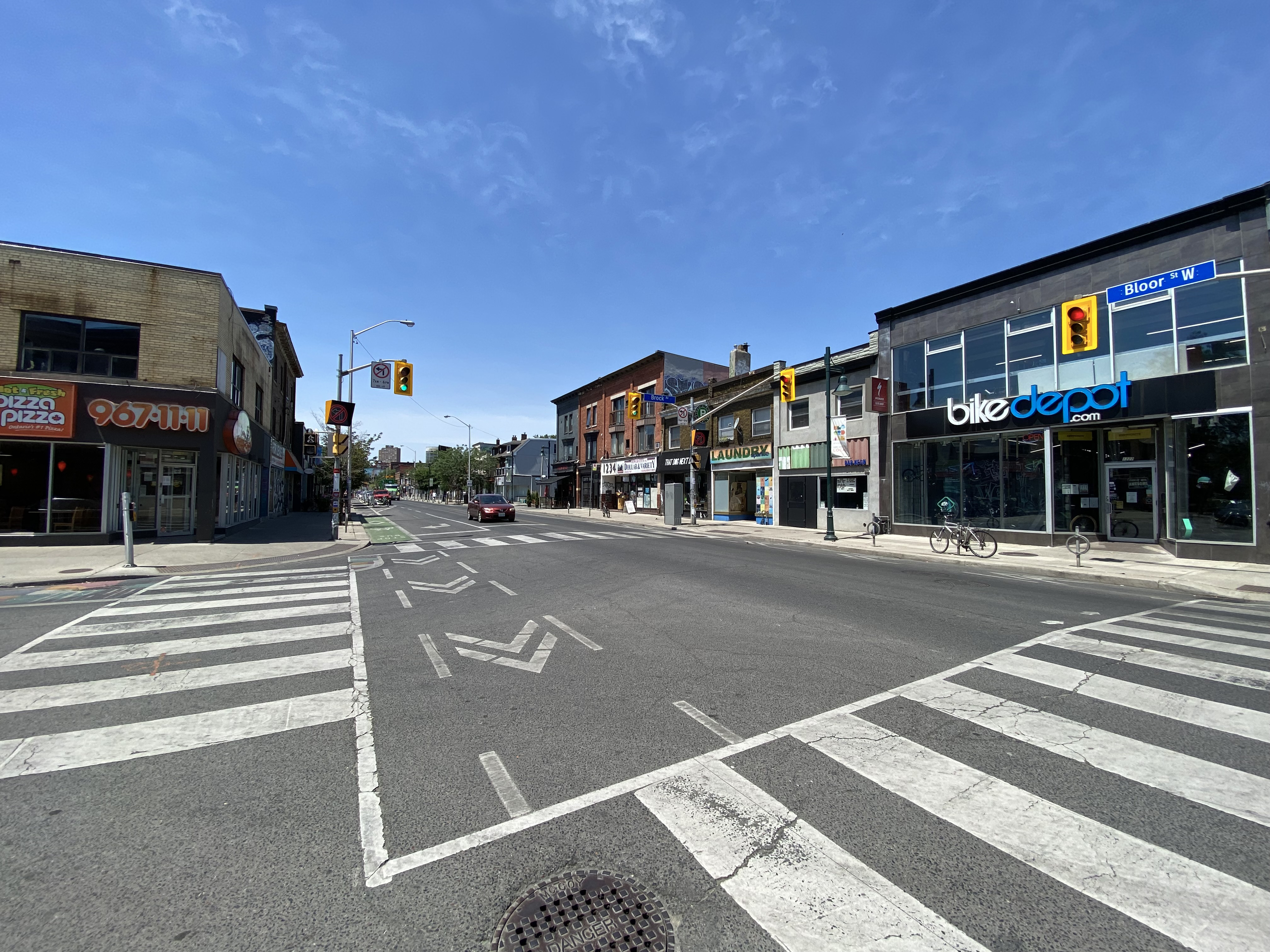
Bloor St. West at Brock Ave.

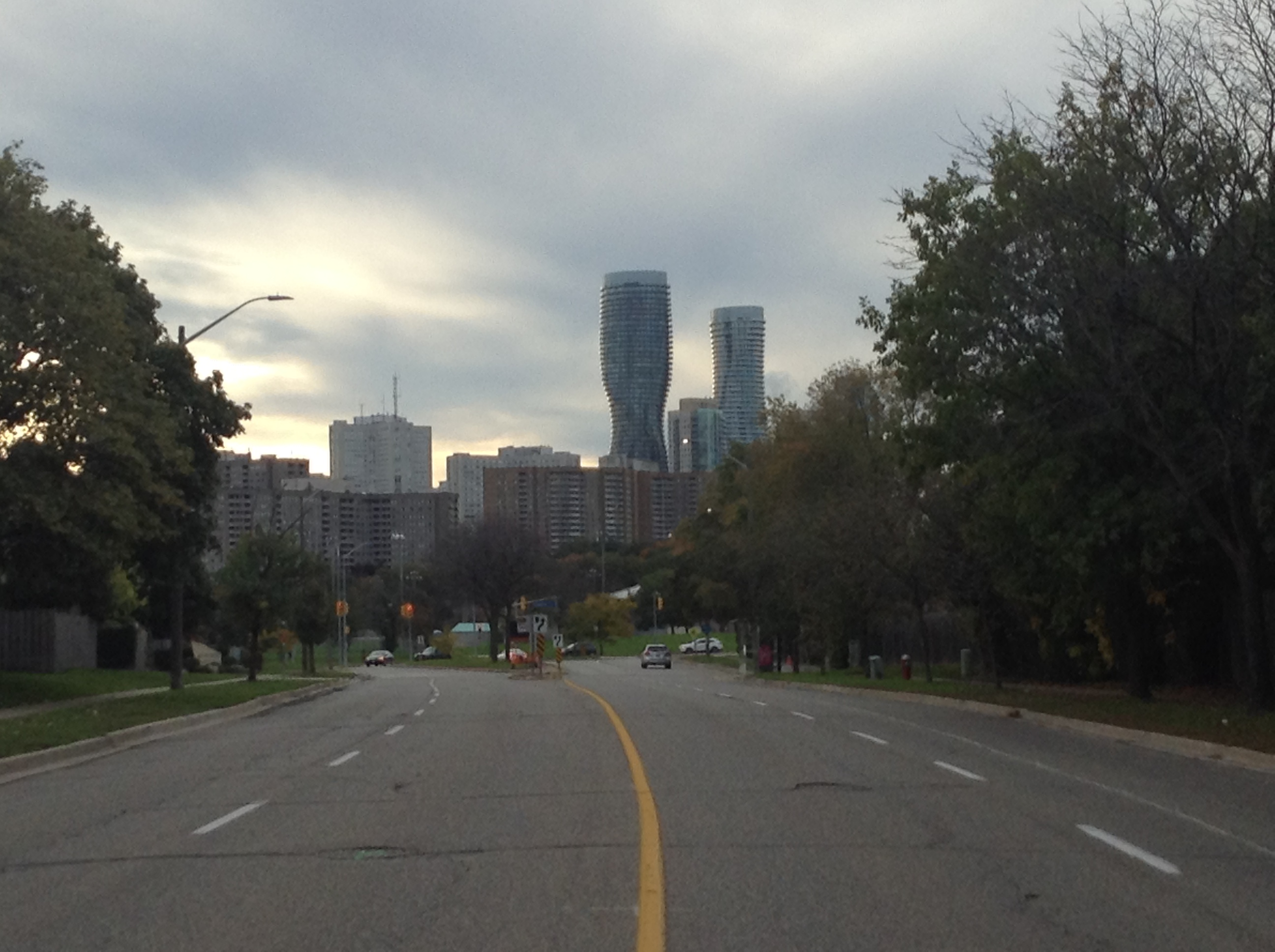
Looking towards the western terminus of Bloor with the towers of Mississauga City Centre beyond

== Bike lanes ==
A bike lane on Bloor Street at Quebec Avenue in Toronto

The idea of installing bicycle lanes on Bloor had been debated since at least the early 1970s. On May 4, 2016, city council voted 38–3 to implement physically separated bike lanes along a 2.6 km (1.6 mi) stretch of the street. Mayor John Tory stated, in support of the project, that if council sought to make Toronto a "21st century city", it must improve at providing "alternate ways to move people around the city." A pilot project installed lanes in August 2016, removing 136 parking spots, and made them permanent in November 2017. An economic study comparing a stretch of the street with bicycle lanes to Danforth Avenue, which did not have them, found the impact of the lanes to be either neutral or positive, and no differences in difficulty finding parking between the two sites. The lanes increased cycling trips by 50%, reduced conflict between drivers and cyclists by 61%, and increased spending at local businesses, but increased car travel times by up to four minutes. The lanes were extended west to Runnymede Avenue in 2020, then into Etobicoke, first to Aberfoyle Crescent in 2023 and then Resurrection Road in 2024.

The provincial government of Doug Ford passed Bill 212 in November 2024, which ordered the removal of bicycle lanes specifically on Bloor Street, University Avenue, and Yonge Street and to replace them with lanes for vehicular traffic. The group Cycle Toronto filed a Charter challenge seeking an injunction to prevent dismantling the lanes. The Ontario Superior Court ruled in favour of Cycle Toronto, concluding that replacing the bike lanes with vehicle lanes would not decrease traffic congestion but would put people at risk of harm and death, violating their rights. The decision was later overturned by the Ontario Court of Appeals. Protestors delayed construction work, with multiple arrests (including Paralympian Aly Van Wyck-Smart), but a 1.2km stretch in Etobicoke was ultimately removed in October 2026.
