= Davenport Road =

Thoroughfare in Toronto, Ontario

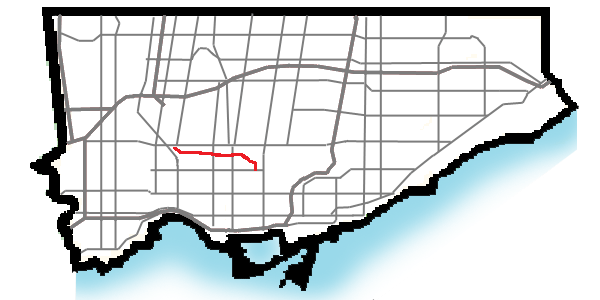
- Maintained by: City of Toronto government
- West end: Old Weston Road
- Major junctions: Dufferin Street; Bathurst Street; Dupont Street; Avenue Road
- East end: Yonge Street (continues south as Church Street)
Nearby arterial roads in Toronto
← Dupont Street	St. Clair Avenue →

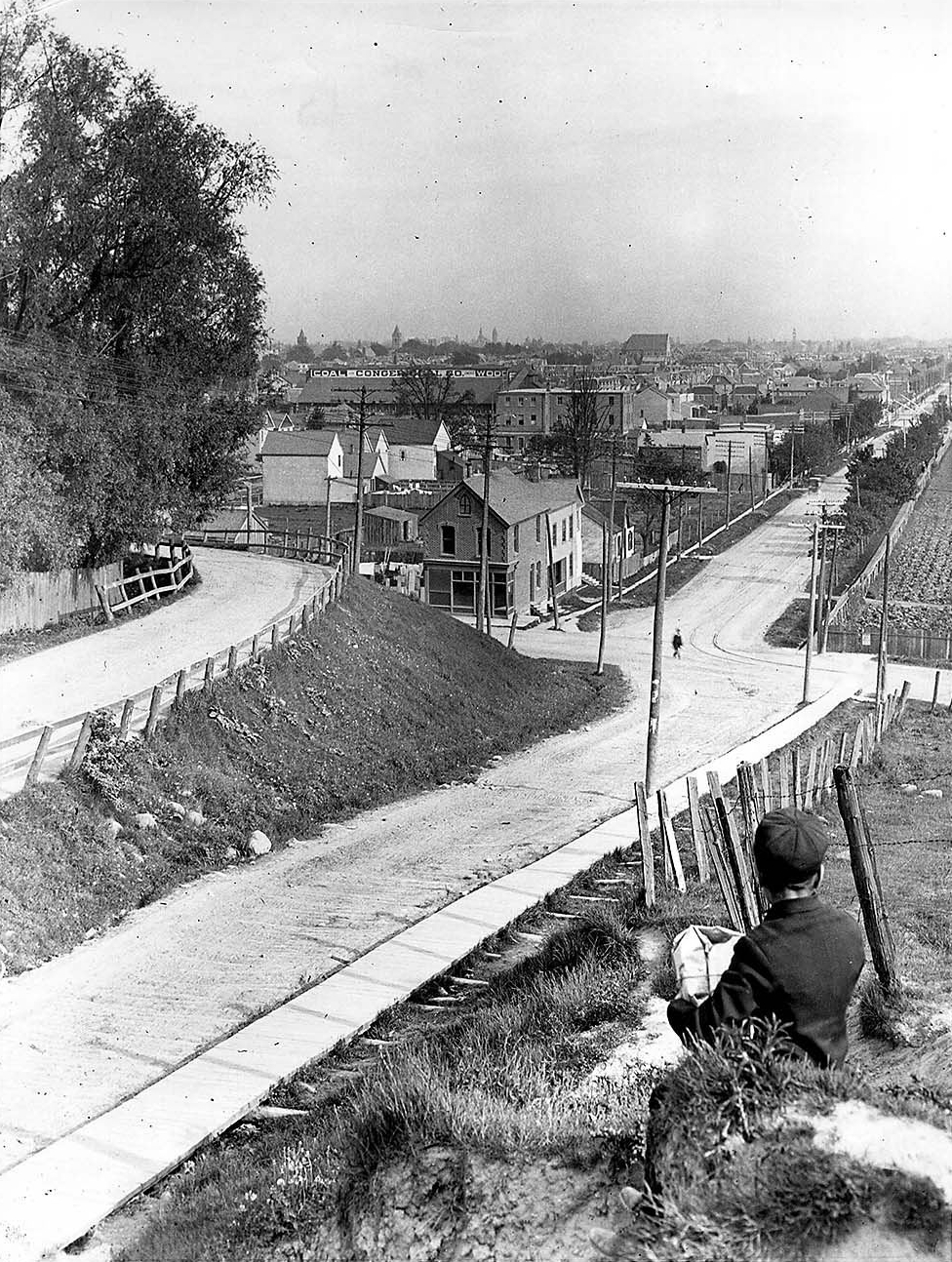
Davenport Road runs east–west at the foot of this scarp.

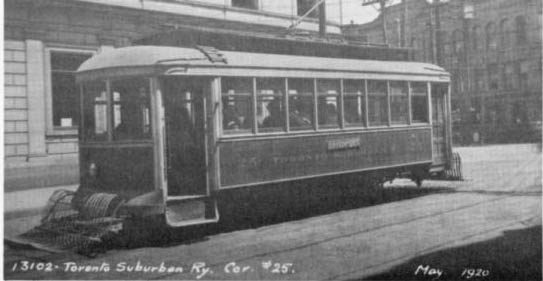
Davenport Road streetcar.

Davenport Road is an east–west arterial road in Toronto, Ontario, Canada. It is believed to be the oldest road in Toronto, starting as a native trail called "old portage" along the shoreline scarp of Glacial Lake Iroquois. It currently runs from Yonge Street in the east to Old Weston Road in the west.

Davenport Road may be the oldest road in Toronto, it is the shoreline of Glacial Lake Iroquois and its first use as a trail is unknown and may be over 10,000 years old. The archeology is on a First Nations trail, connecting the Don River and the Humber River. It was known as "Gete-Onigaming," Ojibwe for "at the old portage." From the Don River, the trail followed the Rosedale Valley Road up to the current Davenport Road. The trail followed Davenport to Old Weston Road and St. Clair Avenue, then west along St. Clair to the Lambton area, then followed the route of the current Dundas Street to the Humber. The trail, which continued along the modern route of Kingston Road east of the Don, and what is now Dundas Street west of the Humber. The Toronto portion of the trail had several earlier names, including "Plank Road", "Bull Road", and "the new road to Niagara"—but by 1797, it was known as Davenport Road. The section east of Bathurst Street was originally a part of Vaughan Road.

The road was named after the 1797 Davenport house of soldier John McGill, situated in the vicinity of the northeast corner of Bathurst and Davenport. It was likely named for Major Davenport stationed at Fort York. Colonel Joseph Wells bought the property and demolished the house 1821 McGill's estate. Wells served as a legislator, bank director and treasurer of Upper Canada College. George Dupont Wells, his son, inspired the naming of Dupont Street and Wells Hill Avenue.

The road was paved outside of York, Upper Canada in 1833, with the improvements to be paid for by tolls. Tollkeepers' cottages were constructed every few kilometres, the cottage near what is now the intersection of Bathurst Street and Davenport Road surviving to the present day.

During the 1837 Upper Canada Rebellion rebel leader William Lyon Mackenzie personally burned the home of Dr. R. C. Horne a prominent Tory, at the corner of Davenport Road and Yonge Street.

On April 20, 1891, the newly incorporated Davenport Street Railway Company was awarded rights to operate a streetcar by West Toronto Junction. When the route began operation on September 6, 1892, it was the second electrified streetcar line in the Toronto area—earlier routes being horse-drawn. The route ran from Keele and Dundas streets to Bathurst and Dupont streets. In 1894, the Davenport Street Railway Company was purchased by the Toronto Suburban Street Railway Company, which was in turn acquired by the owners of the Canadian Northern Railway. The line had originally used a broad gauge, like Toronto's other streetcar lines—so railway companies couldn't run freight on ordinary streets. Although it was later changed to standard gauge no freight was ever carried.

In 1896, The Daily Mail and Empire published a letter from a reader responding to recent article on roads requiring repair in Toronto described Davenport as being in "simply disgraceful condition". The reader described Davenport Road, and several other roads, as being "block paved", and complained "this kind of pavement is anything but durable"—due either to Toronto's climate, or poor construction.

In 1912, the farm at the south-west corner of Bathurst Street and Davenport became the Hillcrest Racetrack of Abe Orpen. The track was only open for a few years, closing in 1916. The site is now the Hillcrest Yard of the Toronto Transit Commission.

In 1994, bicycle lanes were added to Davenport Road.

== Public transit ==
The main service on Davenport is TTC's route 127 Davenport, it operates on Davenport from Old Weston Road to Spadina Road.

TTC route 19 also operates a short section along Davenport from Dupont Street to Bay Street.

The sections from Spadina Road to Dupont Street and Bay Street to Yonge Street don't have bus service, though it's a short walk between them.

== See also ==
- List of east–west roads in Toronto
