= Dufferin Street =

Roadway in Ontario, Canada

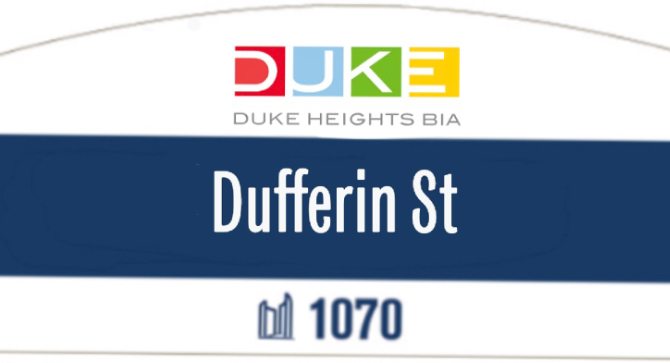
- York Regional Road 53
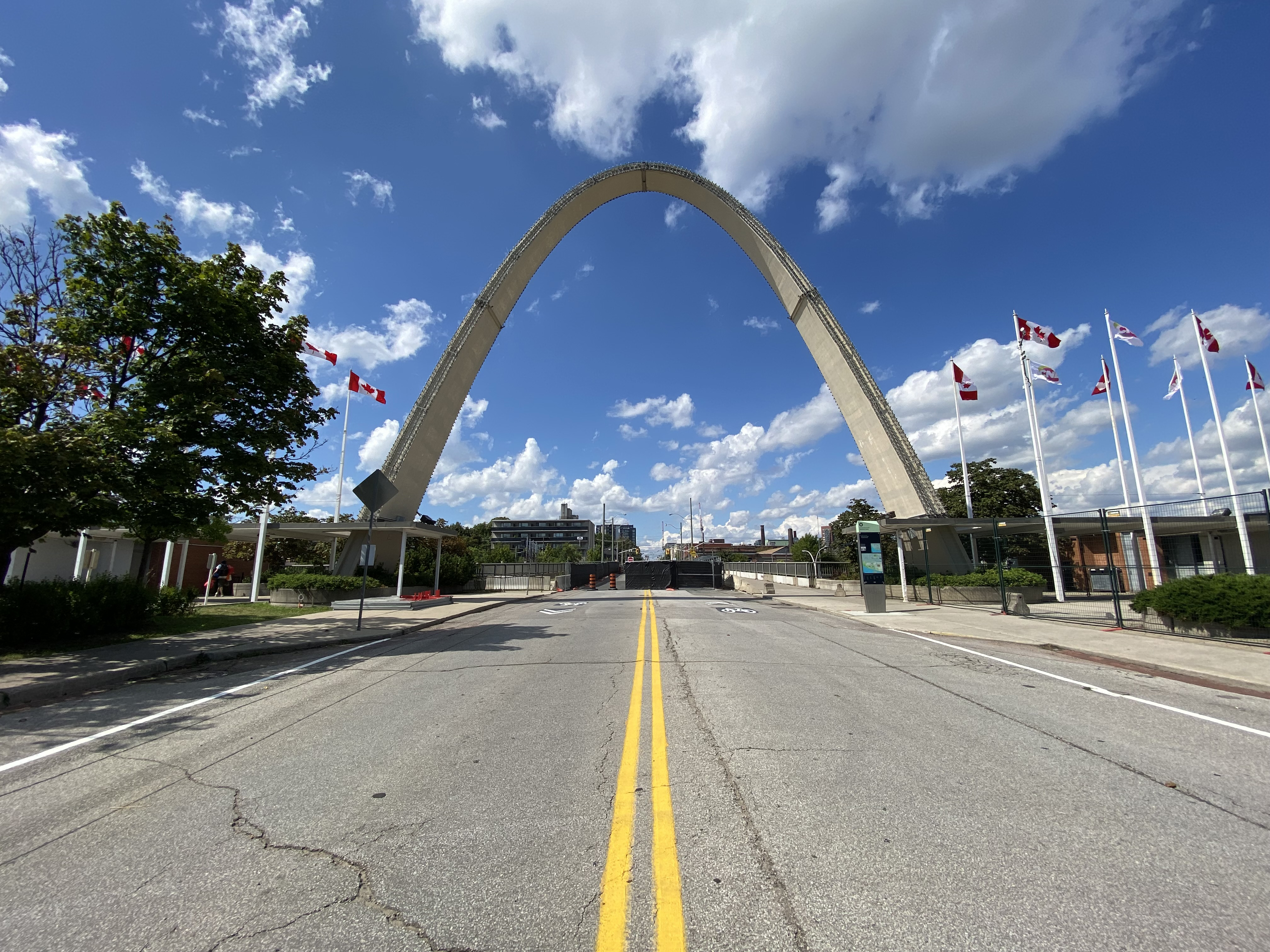
- The Dufferin Gates at Exhibition Place at the foot of Dufferin Street.

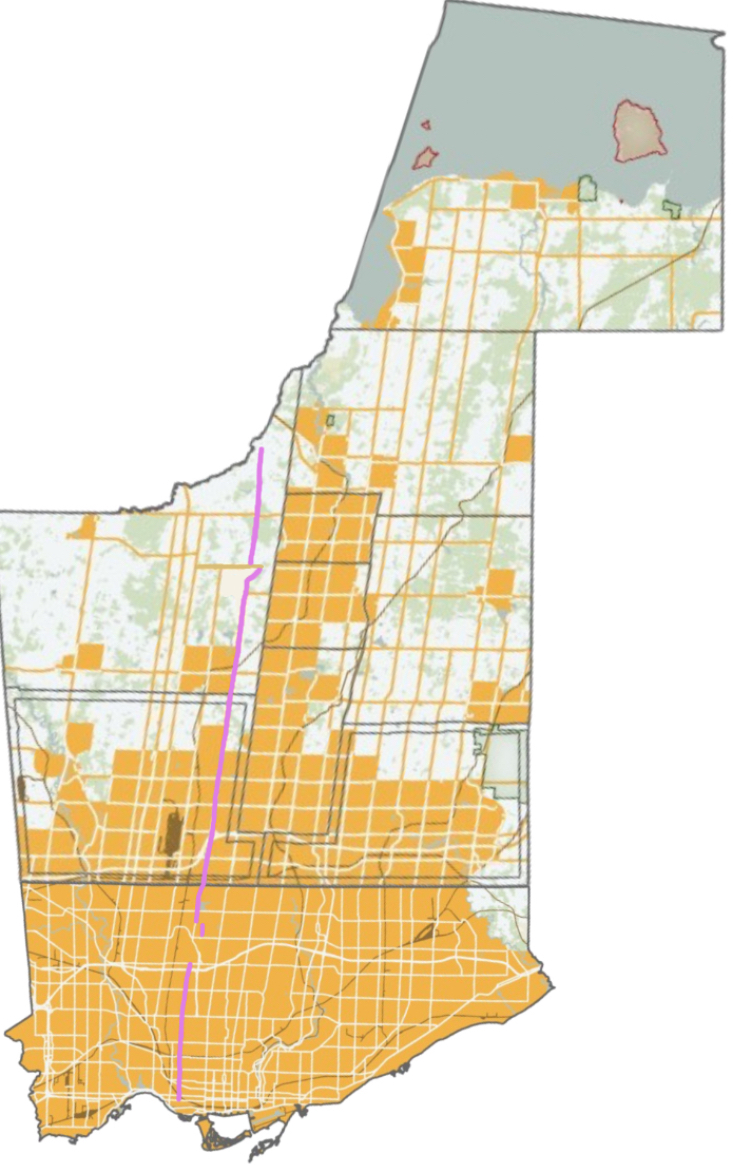
- Route of Dufferin Street (pink line) within Toronto and York Region
- Namesake: Frederick Lord Dufferin
- Type: Major Street
- Maintained by: City of Toronto; York Region; Township of King
- Location: Toronto; Vaughan; King; Gwillimbury
- South end: Exhibition Place (Continues as British Columbia Road through the Exhibition grounds)
- Major junctions: King Street; Queen Street; Dundas Street; Bloor Street; St. Clair Avenue; Eglinton Avenue; Lawrence Avenue; Highway 401; Wilson Avenue; ------Road Breaks------; Allen Road (continuation of); Finch Avenue; Steeles Avenue; Centre Street; Highway 407; Highway 7; Langstaff Road; Rutherford Road; Major Mackenzie Drive; Teston Road; Kirby Road; King-Vaughan Road; King Road; Davis Drive
- North end: Graham Sideroad, in the Holland Marsh, Bradford West Gwillimbury

Other
Nearby arterial roads in Toronto
← Keele Street	Bathurst Street →

Dufferin Street is a major north–south street in Toronto, Vaughan and King, Ontario, Canada. It is a concession road, two concessions (4 km) west of Yonge Street. The street starts at Exhibition Place, continues north to Toronto's northern boundary at Steeles Avenue with some discontinuities and continues into Vaughan, where it is designated York Regional Road 53. The street is named for Frederick Hamilton-Temple-Blackwood, 1st Marquess of Dufferin and Ava, who served as Governor General of Canada from 1872 to 1878. Prior to 1878, the street was labelled as Western City Limits or Sideline Road south off Bloor. In 2003 and 2007, it was voted as one of "Ontario's Worst 20 Roads" in the Ontario's Worst Roads poll organized by the Canadian Automobile Association.

== Route description ==
=== Exhibition Place to Queen Street ===
The southern end of Dufferin is the Dufferin Gates at the entrance to Exhibition Place, which holds the annual Canadian National Exhibition (CNE). The two Dufferin Street bridges connect the Exhibition Place with the rest of Dufferin Street to the north. The 1911 bridge span across the railway north of the CNE grounds was determined to be unsafe for vehicular traffic in 2013, and was closed to vehicles. The bridge was scheduled for replacement starting in 2016. The City of Toronto plans to build a temporary bridge to restore vehicular traffic in advance of the replacement construction.

North of the CNE grounds, the east side of Dufferin Street is dominated by industrial or transitional industrial to residential and commercial buildings of Liberty Village, with several old factories being converted to loft-style condominiums. The west side is mostly single-family homes with one apartment building south of King Street. The neighbourhood to the west is named Parkdale, which was developed mostly before 1900.

=== Queen Street to Eglinton Avenue ===
North of Queen Street West, Dufferin is primarily residential on both sides, with the large Dufferin Mall on the west side of Dufferin, south of Bloor Street. This was the former site of the Dufferin Park Racetrack. Across the street from the mall is the Dufferin Grove city park. From Queen Street north to College Street, the neighbourhood is known as Little Portugal. North of College, and west of Dufferin is the former village of Brockton and on the east is the Dufferin Grove neighbourhood, named after the park on the east side of Dufferin. Dufferin station is located at Dufferin Street and Bloor Street on Line 2 Bloor–Danforth of the Toronto subway system.

From Bloor Street to Davenport Road, Dufferin is lined with homes built from the 1920s to post-World War II. The Galleria Shopping Centre is located on the west side of Dufferin and on the south side of Dupont Street. The neighbourhood west of Dufferin in this area is known as Wallace Emerson, while on the east it is known as Dovercourt Park. North of Davenport, Dufferin ascends the former Lake Iroquois shoreline escarpment. North of the escarpment, the street continues to be residential on both sides north to Eglinton Avenue West. Between Rogers Road and Eglinton Avenue West, Dufferin Street crosses two steep ravines. Fairbank station is located at Dufferin Street and Eglinton Avenue on Line 5 Eglinton of the Toronto subway system.

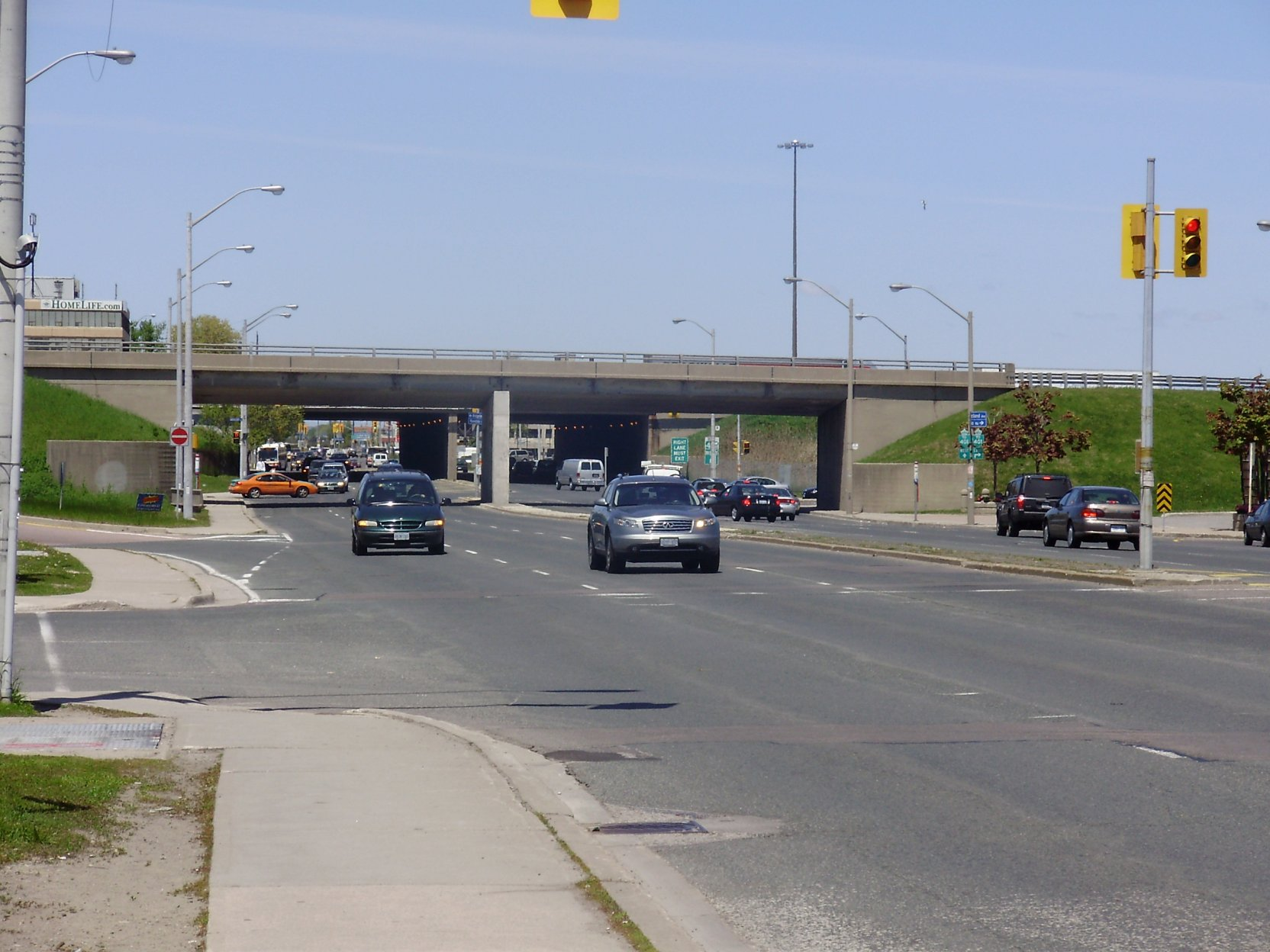
Dufferin Street is eight lanes wide in the vicinity of Highway 401.

=== Eglinton Avenue to Wilson Avenue ===
North of Eglinton Avenue, it becomes a six-lane arterial road through industrial and low-density commercial lands of the former North York. The regional shopping centre of Yorkdale Shopping Centre is located at Dufferin and Highway 401. The sections from Eglinton into York Region was originally Vaughan Road.

=== North of Sheppard Avenue ===
North of Wilson Avenue, Dufferin is interrupted by Downsview Airport and Allen Road, the latter of which feeds Dufferin north of Kennard Avenue (formerly Wilson Heights Boulevard), north of Sheppard Avenue.

A broken section of Dufferin Street runs parallel with Allen Road, one block east, south of the continuation from Allen Rd., from Sheppard Ave. to Kennard Ave. This section is a residential street and ends in a cul-de-sac just south of Kennard. North of Wilson, Dufferin Street runs 210 metres (690 ft) to Katherine Street and continues on as Beffort Road/Hanover Road.

=== North of Steeles Avenue ===
Dufferin Street continues north of Steeles Avenue into the city of Vaughan. The section north to Highway 7 and Langstaff Road is a six-lane arterial road, designated as York Regional Road 53. North of that, it narrows to four lanes, then narrows again two blocks north of Major Mackenzie Drive to two lanes. North of Lloydtown/Aurora Road (York Road 16) / 18th Sideroad (York Road 26), it is maintained by King Township and terminates just north of Graham Sideroad in the Holland Marsh, after jogging at Davis Drive (York Road 31), the former Highway 9.

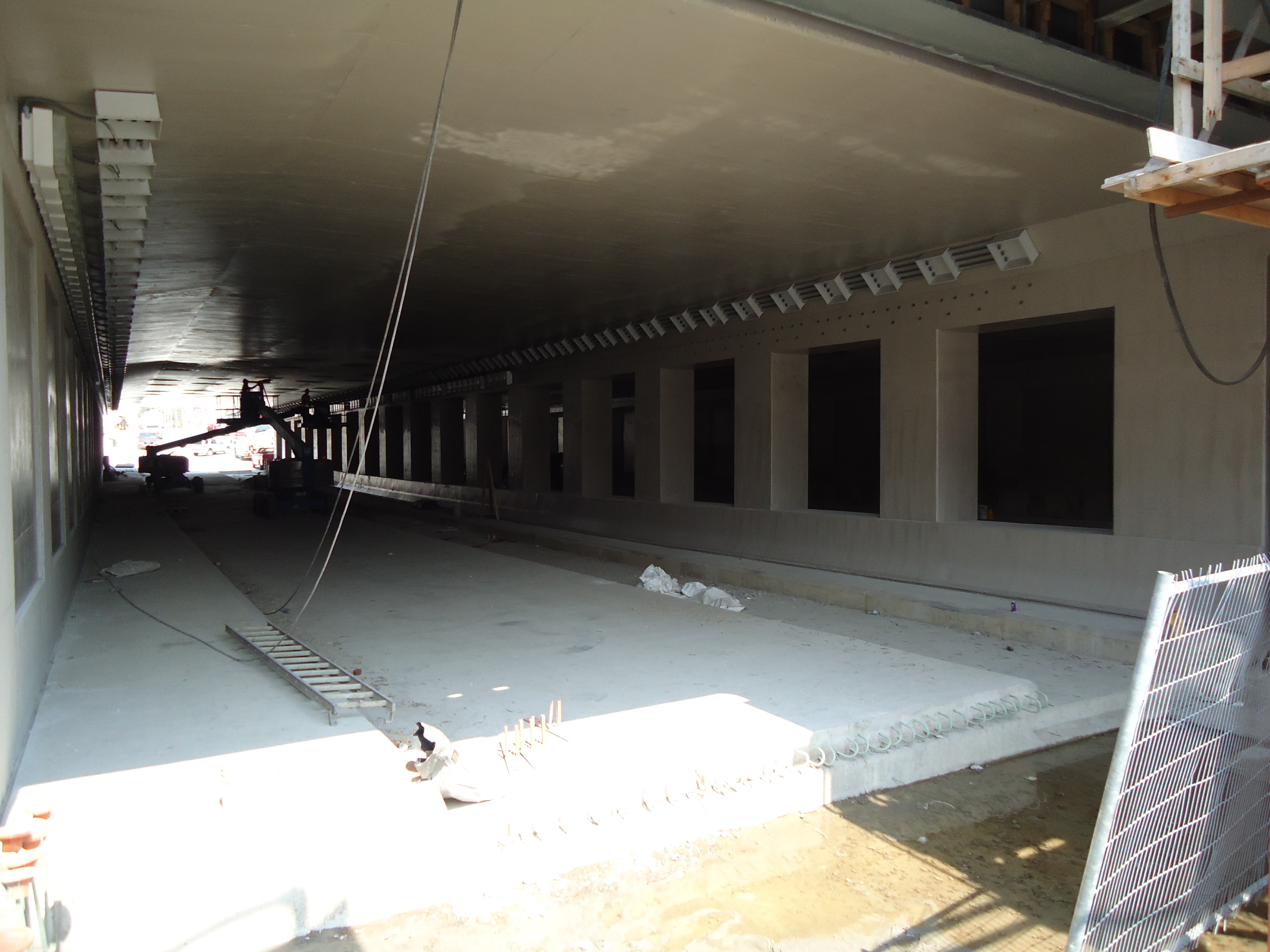
The Dufferin Jog was recently removed at Queen Street, providing drivers with a direct continuation of Dufferin Street

== Dufferin jogs ==
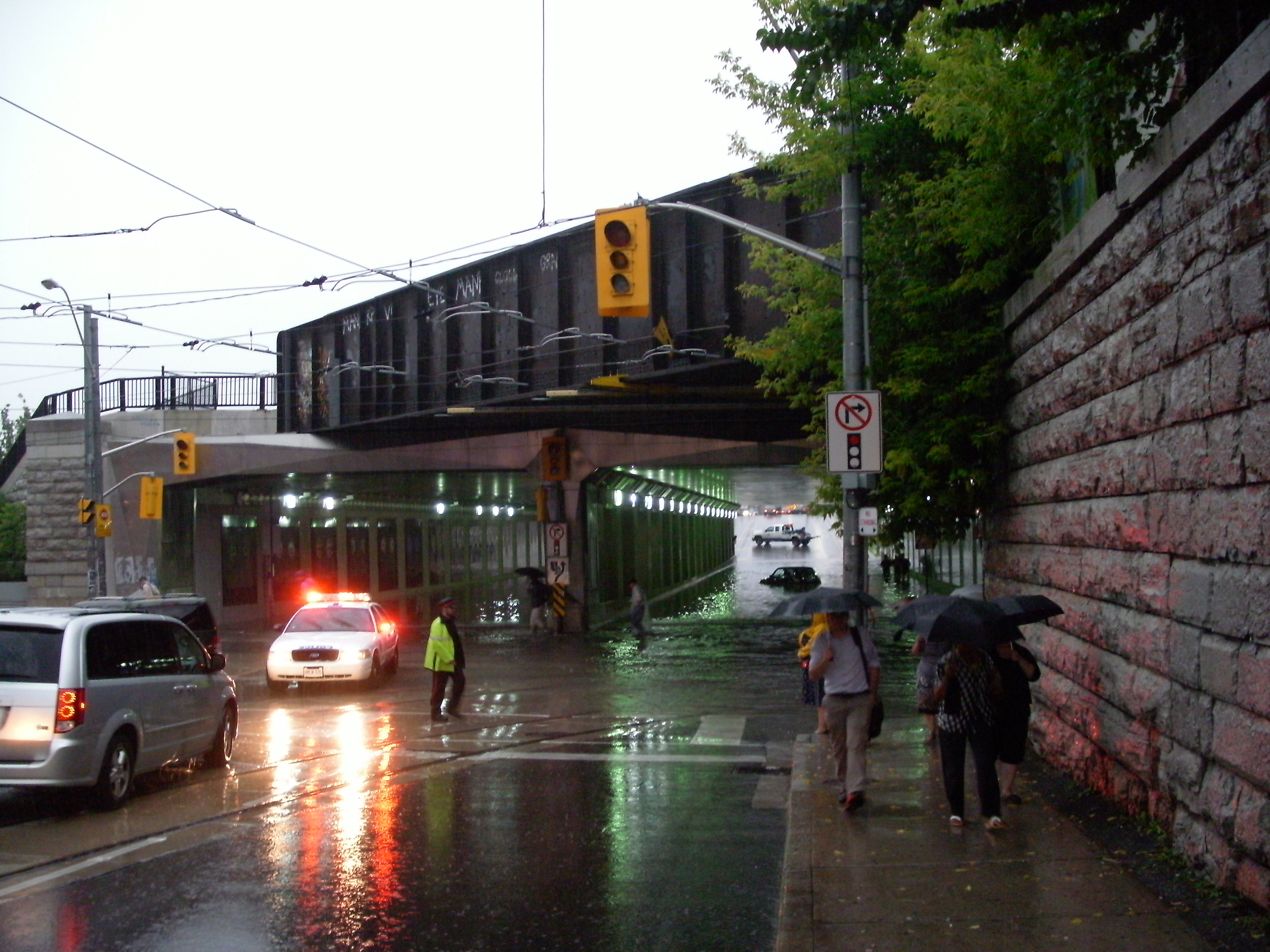
The Dufferin Street underpass at Queen was flooded on July 8, 2013

=== Queen Street ===
The intersection of Dufferin Street and Queen Street West intersects with the main railway line from northwest of Toronto to downtown at Union Station. This intersection was the site of the Parkdale Railway Station which was originally a level crossing. In the 1890s, an underpass (initially called "the subway") was built for Queen Street to accommodate growing east–west traffic; however, one was not built for Dufferin Street to connect it a block north of Queen. At the time, the area north of the railway line was heavily industrial and factories backed onto the tracks. North–south traffic was not expected nor planned for and the two sections of Dufferin were not connected. As automobiles arrived in Toronto around 1903, and for the next 107 years, vehicles looking to travel along Dufferin detoured around the closed section to Peel (east–west) and Gladstone (north–south), which became de facto sections of Dufferin. The detour was known locally as the "Dufferin Jog".

The jog was eliminated in 2010 with the construction of a four-lane underpass beneath the railway tracks, including public art and an amphitheatre-styled park with tiered gardens at the southwest corner of the underpass. This project was approved by city council in 2007, and work on extending the roadway began in July 2009. The underpass was opened on November 18, 2010. The new underpass project was completed on time at a cost of CA$40 million. A further widening of the north side of the bridge was completed in 2016–2017 to support expanded GO Transit rail service.

The section of the east side of the bridge along Queen Street was built in 1897 as the Queen Street Subway.

=== Wilson–Sheppard ===
There is also currently a jog from Wilson to Sheppard, caused by the Downsview airbase built in 1929, which when built, was a rural area. Wilson Heights Blvd was built rerouting the northern section to head east avoiding the airport, with a jog at the southern section. In 1982, the northern section was rerouted again into Allen road. Today the path to connect the 2 sections is to go east on Wilson Avenue, north on Transit road, north on Allen road, of which funnels into Dufferin, and vice-versa.

== Italian community ==
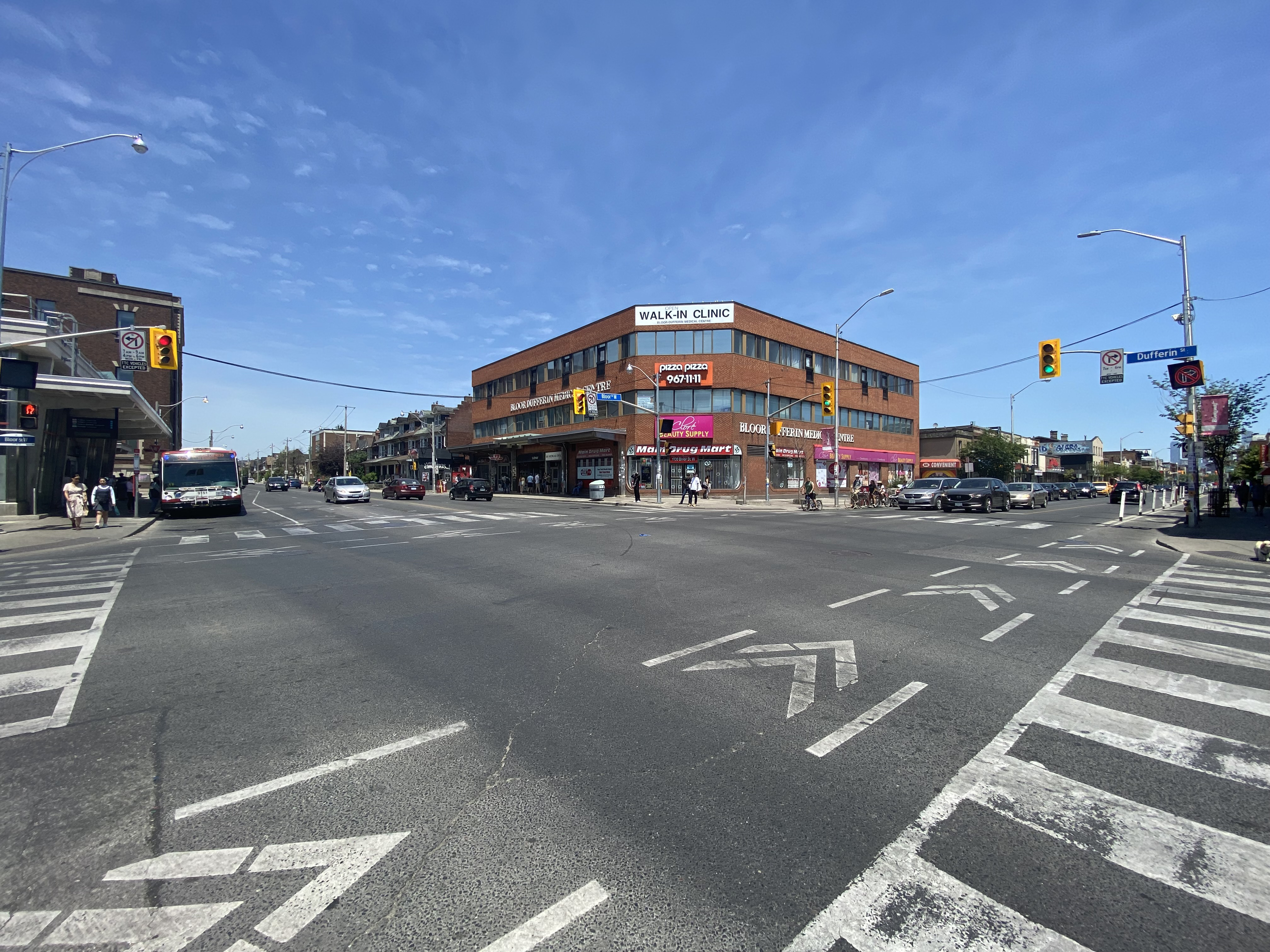
Dufferin Street at Bloor Street West (2022)

Dufferin Street has long been an important thoroughfare for Toronto's Italian community. An Italian neighbourhood developed around Dufferin and Davenport in the 1890s and soon became known as "little Little Italy". In the 1950s, Italian-Canadians from the main Little Italy around College Street and Grace Street headed northwest up Dufferin past St. Clair Avenue and were joined by a new wave of immigrants from Italy. By the 1960s, the Dufferin-St. Clair area (known as Corso Italia) had supplanted College-Grace Little Italy as the largest centre of Toronto's Italian community. There is also a large Italian-Canadian presence along much of the suburban sections of the street as well, in both Toronto and Vaughan.

== Public transit ==
The Toronto Transit Commission (TTC) operates the 29 Dufferin and 929 Dufferin Express bus routes, which run from the lake shore along the full length of Dufferin to Wilson station on the Yonge–University subway line. At the section of Dufferin Street Parallel to Allen Road, the North Side Entrance of the Sheppard West station is situated at the south end of this section of Dufferin Street. The buses also connect with the Bloor–Danforth subway at Dufferin station. When the CNE is not operating, Dufferin buses continue south within Exhibition Place to Fleet Street where streetcar tracks carry the 509 Harbourfront and 511 Bathurst routes.

The 29 Dufferin bus was the busiest TTC bus route in 2007 and 2008, with an average 43,600 riders each weekday. As of 2010, it was the fifth-busiest route, with an average of 39,700 riders per weekday. Buses run every two to ten minutes on the route, depending on the time of the day.

The 105 Dufferin North bus route runs north from Sheppard West station, along Allen Road and Dufferin Street to Steeles Avenue.

The 329 Dufferin Blue night operates when the 29 and 105 do not, from 1-6am Monday-Saturday and 1-8am Sunday. it operates from the Exhibition to Steeles via Wilson Heights between Wilson and Sheppard due to the air force base cutting the street off.

York Region Transit operates the 105 Dufferin bus route along Dufferin Street, running north from Sheppard West Station to Major Mackenzie Drive in Vaughan. The YRT 105 only drops off southbound and picks up northbound from Steeles to Sheppard west station, because the TTC operates its 105 in that section.

=== Priority bus lanes ===
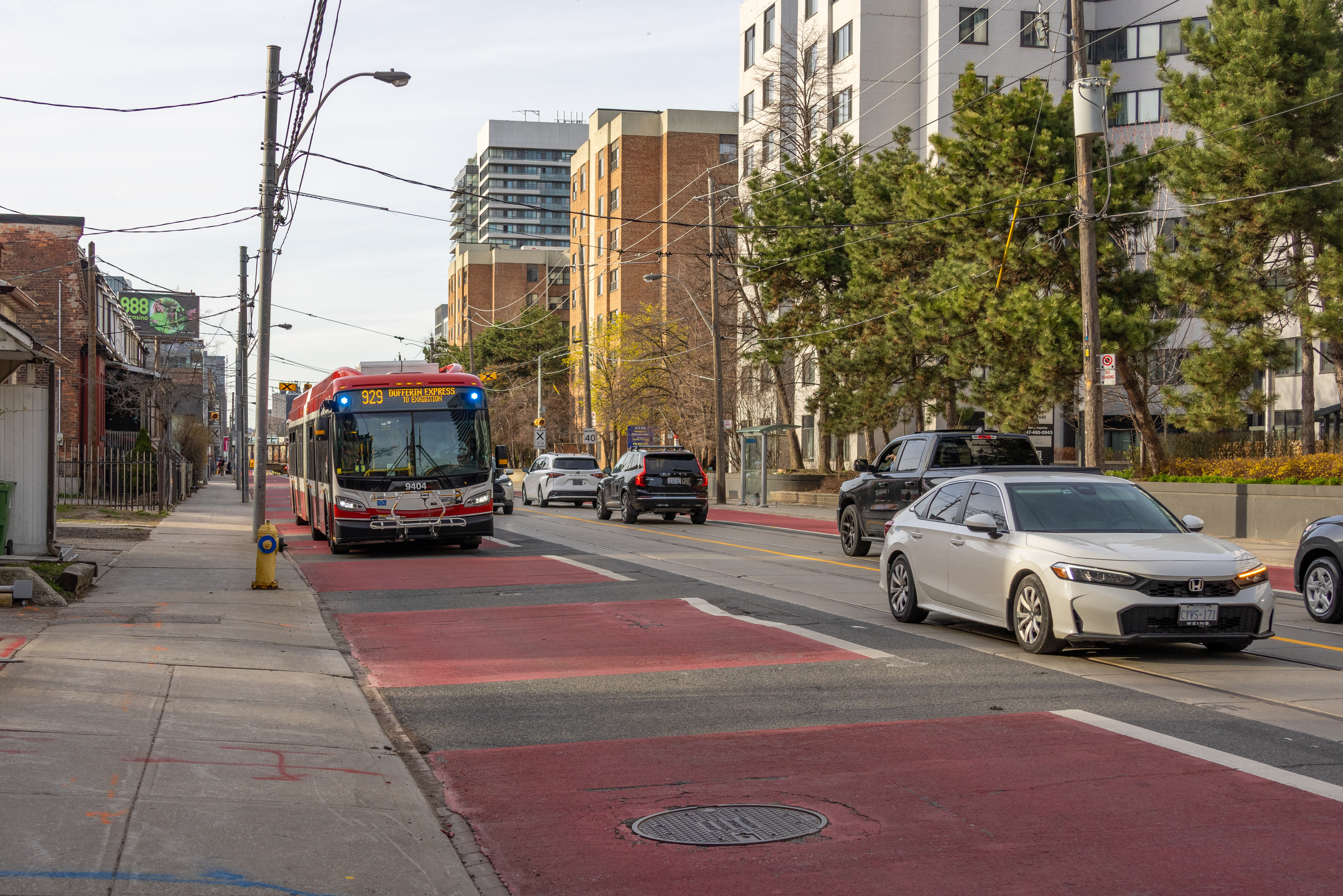
An express bus utilizing the southbound priority bus lane on Dufferin Street in 2026

In 2025, the City of Toronto approved dedicated lanes for buses on Dufferin Street. Under the plan, dubbed "RapidTO," curbside lanes became priority lanes for buses in an effort to make transit more reliable. The municipal government began painting these lanes red in November 2025, with plans to finish before the 2026 FIFA World Cup in Toronto in June 2026.
