= Ontario Highway 11A =

Former Ontario provincial highway

Highway 11A
- Avenue Road; University Avenue; York Street
- A map of Highway 11A; Highway 11A; Former route replaced by Highway 401 in 1952

Route information
- Auxiliary route of Highway 11
- Maintained by City of Toronto
- Length: 12.4 km (7.7 mi)
- Existed: January 21, 1931–April 1, 1997

Major junctions
- South end: Highway 2 (Gardiner Expressway) in Downtown Toronto
- Highway 5 (Bloor Street) in Yorkville
- North end: Highway 401

Location
- Country: Canada
- Province: Ontario
- Major cities: Toronto

Highway system
- Ontario provincial highways; Current; Former; 400-series
| ← Highway 11 | → Highway 11B |

King's Highway 11A, commonly referred to as Highway 11A, was the highway designation for an alternate route of Highway 11 in the Canadian province of Ontario. The north-south route paralleled Highway 11 (Yonge Street) within Toronto, serving as a secondary access to Downtown Toronto. It began at the York exit of the Gardiner Expressway (Highway 2) and travelled north on York Street to Front Street, where it transitioned onto University Avenue. It continued north on University Avenue to Queen's Park, where Highway 11A followed Queen's Park Crescent, encircling the Ontario Legislative Building, before continuing along Avenue Road. Highway 11A travelled along Avenue Road to Upper Canada College. It followed Lonsdale Road, Oriole Parkway, and Oxton Avenue around the campus and back to Avenue Road, which resumes north of the school. It continued north along Avenue Road to Highway 401, ending just north of the highway at Bombay Avenue.

Highway 11A was established in 1930, when the province built an extension of Avenue Road north from the city limits of the old City of Toronto to complete a parallel alternative to Highway 11. It connected to that route via the Hogg's Hollow Bridge, which had been completed the previous year to provide a level detour of the deep ravine of the West Don River. Although the streets it followed within old Toronto were not maintained by the province, they were signed as part of the highway as a city-maintained Connecting Link for continuity, which was a policy that also applied to other highways that followed city streets. The Hogg's Hollow Bridge was incorporated into Highway 401 upon its completion in 1952, truncating Highway 11A at the interchange with the new freeway. When Metropolitan Toronto was formed in 1953, most provincial routes within its boundaries which were not already connecting links, including Highway 11A, were designated as such. The short and then-recently urbanized northernmost section of the highway was given Connecting Link status in early 1954 and the whole route continued to be signed until 1997 when it was fully decommissioned.

== Route description ==
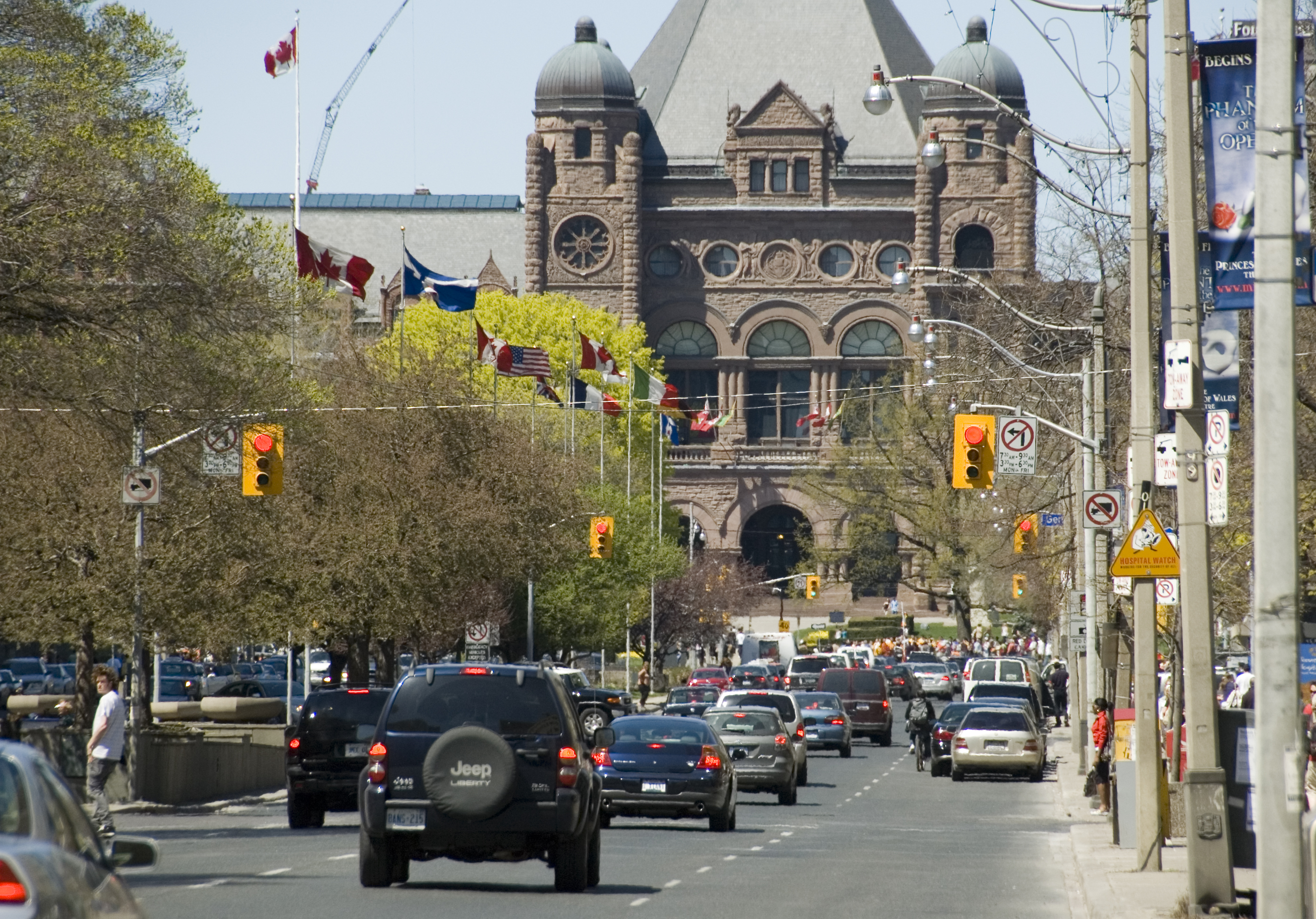
Highway 11A was signed through Toronto along University Avenue, although the provincial government never maintained this section

The vast majority of Highway 11A followed University Avenue in downtown Toronto and Avenue Road north of downtown to Highway 401. Short segments followed York Street, Queen's Park Crescent, Lonsdale Road, Oriole Parkway and Oxton Avenue; all but York Street are due to directional diversions or breaks in the primary streets around Queen's Park and Upper Canada College respectively.

=== University Avenue ===
University Avenue begins at the intersection of Front and York streets near Union Station and heads northwest for a short distance before turning north. Lanes on the left end as a ramp to an underground parking garage. At Adelaide Street West, the avenue divides slightly, leaving room for a median of greenery and sculptures between the north and southbound lanes. The avenue ends at College Street, where it splits into Queen's Park Crescent East (northbound) and Queen's Park Crescent West (southbound). Between these two roads is Queen's Park, the home of the Ontario Legislative Building. This landmark creates a terminating vista for those looking north along University. The legislature's site was originally home to the main building of the University of Toronto, and this is the origin of the avenue's name. Today, the university surrounds the legislature building. Just to the north, Queen's Park Crescent converges back to become a single street; Queen's Park, north to Bloor Street, where Avenue Road begins.

=== Avenue Road ===
Avenue Road is the western limit of the former town of Yorkville. At its southern terminus, it runs between two of Toronto's major hotels, the Park Hyatt (on the northwest corner of Bloor and Avenue Road) and the Four Seasons Hotel. On the northeast corner of the intersection with Bloor is the Church of the Redeemer. For much of its length the road is fairly residential, with a mix of small businesses, as well as a few large schools and churches. A notable site along this "lower section" is the Hare Krishna Temple, formerly the Avenue Road Church, opposite Dupont Street and across the street from the Anglican Church of The Messiah. Just north of St. Clair Avenue, Avenue Road is interrupted by Upper Canada College, ending at Lonsdale Road and resuming again at Kilbarry Road. The primary traffic route runs east of the school, following widened sections of Lonsdale Road and Oriole Parkway and returning to Avenue Road via Oxton Avenue.

North of Eglinton Avenue, the former St. James-Bond Church once stood. This building, which used to house two prime downtown congregations – St. James Square (formerly Presbyterian), and Bond Street (formerly Congregationalist) – was built in the late 1920s and closed in June 2005. It has since been demolished. Near Lawrence Avenue is Havergal College, a large private girls' school. Although in the former city of North York, much of the area considers the school part of North Toronto. Avenue Road ends at Bombay Avenue, just after crossing Highway 401 (Exit 367). Originally, Avenue Road continued from what is now the interchange by angling northeast via the Hogg's Hollow Bridge (across the Don River West Branch) to end at Yonge Street; this section of the road was incorporated into Highway 401 when it was constructed in the 1950s.

== History ==
Highway 11A in North York, facing north towards Wilson Avenue in 1940

Prior to the 1920s, Avenue Road ended north of St. Clair, at Upper Canada College. Short disconnected segments existed north of the college near Eglinton and Glencairn, but otherwise the northern part of the present route was farmland. Seeking to remedy the impediment of the deep valley that Yonge Street (Highway 11) dove into at Hogg's Hollow, the Department of Highways (DHO), predecessor to the modern Ministry of Transportation of Ontario (MTO), sought to construct a high-level bridge. Construction began in early 1928, with the bridge opening on January 5, 1929, providing a much-needed bypass of the deep ravine. Yonge Boulevard crossed the bridge, connecting to Highway 11 north and south of the valley. While under construction, the City of Toronto and DHO examined a new route parallel to Yonge Street south to the lakefront. While Bay Street and Duplex Avenue received some consideration, traffic engineers determined that an extension of Avenue Road would provide the most ideal route. It was initially proposed that Avenue Road cut through Upper Canada College, but this plan was rejected as the city did not have expropriation rights through the property, nor could it afford the price asked by the college. The city instead opted to construct Oriole Parkway to Eglinton Avenue and Avenue Road north of it. The route was paved as far north as Strathallan Boulevard by the autumn of 1928.

The northern portion of Highway 11A at Hogg's Hollow in 1947, with Yonge Street on the right

On January 21, 1931, the DHO assumed 2.00 kilometres (1.24 mi) of roadway leading to the bridge, providing a connection between Wilson Avenue at the planned extension of Avenue Road, and Yonge Street south of Sheppard Avenue, which was designated as Highway 11A. The DHO then began construction on the missing link in Avenue Road between Strathallan Boulevard, near the Toronto city limits, and Wilson Avenue. This section was paved and opened to traffic on October 13, 1932. Maps, including the Official Ontario Road Map, indicated that Highway 11A continued south into Toronto, although the segment south of Otter Crescent (the former boundaries of the old city of Toronto) was entirely built and maintained by the city. Through a Connecting Link agreement, almost the entirety of Avenue Road, Queen's Park Crescent, University Avenue, and York Street, as well as the route around Upper Canada College via Lonsdale Road, Oriole Parkway, and Oxton Avenue as was designated as part of Highway 11A for continuity.

In the late 1940s, planning began on a new bypass of Toronto, which would become Highway 401. Upon its completion between Bathurst Street and Yonge Street in December 1952, Highway 11A was truncated to an interchange with it immediately north of Wilson Avenue. The Hogg's Hollow Bridge was incorporated in the new freeway and continues to carry the eastbound express lanes. Following the creation of Metropolitan Toronto on April 15, 1953, the new upper-tier municipality was given responsibility for most of the provincial highways that passed within its boundaries. Highway 11A was accordingly turned over in its entirety as a Connecting Link on January 15, 1954, but route signage was removed after its decommissioning.

== Major intersections ==
The following table lists the major junctions along Highway 11A, as noted by the Department of Highways. The entire route was located in Metropolitan Toronto.

| Location | km | mi | Destinations | Notes |
|---|---|---|---|---|
| Old Toronto | 0.0 | 0.0 | Highway 2 (Gardiner Expressway) | York Street ramp |
| Old Toronto | 0.5 | 0.31 | Front Street | |
| Old Toronto | 0.8 | 0.50 | King Street West | |
| Old Toronto | 1.2 | 0.75 | Queen Street West | |
| Old Toronto | 1.7 | 1.1 | Dundas Street West | |
| Old Toronto | 2.3 | 1.4 | College Street | University Avenue becomes Queens Park Crescent |
| Old Toronto | 3.4 | 2.1 | Highway 5 (Bloor Street West) | Queens Park Crescent becomes Avenue Road |
| Old Toronto | 4.1 | 2.5 | Davenport Road | |
| Old Toronto | 5.5 | 3.4 | St. Clair Avenue West | |
| Old Toronto | 5.9 | 3.7 | Lonsdale Road | Highway 11A turned east onto Lonsdale Road; Avenue Road interrupted by Upper Canada College |
| Old Toronto | 6.1 | 3.8 | Oriole Parkway | Highway 11A turned north onto Oriole Parkway |
| Old Toronto | 6.7 | 4.2 | Oxton Avenue | Highway 11A turned northwest onto Oxton Avenue |
| Old Toronto | 7.0 | 4.3 | Avenue Road | Highway 11A turned north onto Avenue Road |
| Old Toronto | 7.8 | 4.8 | Eglinton Avenue West | |
| Old Toronto | 9.9 | 6.2 | Lawrence Avenue West | |
| North York | 11.9 | 7.4 | Wilson Avenue | |
| North York | 12.2 | 7.6 | Highway 401 | Highway 401 exit 367 |
| North York | 1.000 mi = 1.609 km; 1.000 km = 0.621 mi | | | |
