= Stinson Jarvis =

Canadian-American writer and lawyer

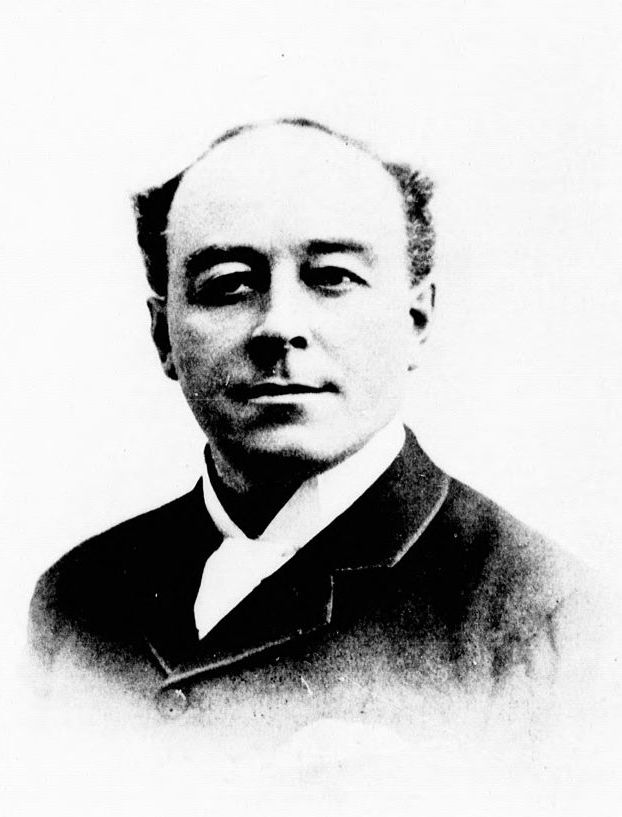
- Thomas Stinson Jarvis circa 1894
- Born: May 31, 1854; Toronto
- Died: January 1, 1926; Los Angeles
- Education: Osgoode Hall Law School
- Occupation: Writer

Thomas Stinson Jarvis (May 31, 1854 – January 1, 1926) was a Canadian-American writer and lawyer. Born in Toronto, he practised law in Ontario before moving to New York City and later to California to pursue a literary career. Jarvis wrote for the popular press and published several novels and other literary works. Except for his first publication, none were particularly well received.

== Early life and education ==
Thomas Stinson Jarvis was born in Toronto, then in Canada West, on May 31, 1854, to Mary (Stinson) and Stephen Jarvis. The Jarvis family stood "in the centre of Toronto society".

Jarvis enrolled at Upper Canada College in September 1863, graduating in 1871. After graduating, he was sent on a one-year tour of Europe and Asia. Jarvis attended Osgoode Hall Law School upon his return to Canada (before its affiliation with York University); he was admitted in 1871 but did not begin studying until 1875.

Jarvis married Anne Louise Croft on May 27, 1881, at the Church of the Redeemer in Toronto.

== Legal career ==
After graduating from Osgoode in 1879, Jarvis articled under Oliver Mowat. He was called to the bar of Ontario in 1879 or 1880. Beginning around 1880, Jarvis practised law in Niagara Falls, Ontario. He often acted in extradition matters; in October 1883, he was appointed to act as extradition counsel to Ontario.

== Literary career ==
=== Journalism ===
Jarvis moved to the United States in 1891, taking up residence at 23 Washington Place in downtown Manhattan, New York. In New York, he initially worked as a sports journalist, writing mainly on yachting for publications including Frank Leslie's Illustrated Newspaper and Sports Afield.

=== Books ===
Jarvis wrote six books and a number of short stories and articles.

Letters from East Longitudes: Sketches of Travel in Egypt, the Holy Land, Greece, and Cities of the Levant, Jarvis's first book, was published in May 1875. It is a travel narrative of his solo journey to various countries in the Near East, with scattered observations of travel in Europe, styled as a set of letters to his parents in Canada. Letters from East Longitudes was favourably reviewed in The Globe and Canadian Monthly.

Geoffrey Hampstead (1890), Jarvis's first novel, is a detective story about a bank clerk who frames his friend for murder. It received lukewarm reviews in the Canadian and American press. Dr. Perdue, a sequel to Geoffrey Hampstead, appeared in February 1893. It was also generally panned.

The Ascent of Life (1894), initially serialized in The Arena, is a spiritualist tract that, among other things, describes Jarvis's alleged experience with clairvoyance and mesmerism. Jarvis withdrew his third novel She Lived in New York (1894) from sale following the poor critical reception of Ascent of Life.

Later in life, Jarvis "came to believe that an ancient Druid priesthood had been controlling history since the dawn of civilization". He expounded on this theory in a "nearly unreadable" set of articles published in the Los Angeles Times in 1913 and 1914. These were subsequently expanded into a book titled The Price of Peace, published by J. F. Rowny, an occult press, in 1921.

Jarvis left New York for California in 1904. He died in Los Angeles on January 1, 1926.

== Sources ==
- Mount, Nicholas J. (2006). When Canadian Literature Moved to New York. University of Toronto Press. doi:10.3138/9781442683310. ISBN 978-1-4426-8331-0. JSTOR 10.3138/j.ctt2ttvq0. OCLC 666893333.
- Wollock, Jeffrey (1969). "Stinson Jarvis: A Bio-Bibliography". Papers of the Bibliographical Society of Canada. 8 (1): 23–60. doi:10.33137/pbsc.v8i1.16734. ISSN 2562-8941.
