= Hare Krishna Temple, Toronto =

Hare Krishna temple in Toronto

Coordinates: 43.67692°N 79.397893°W

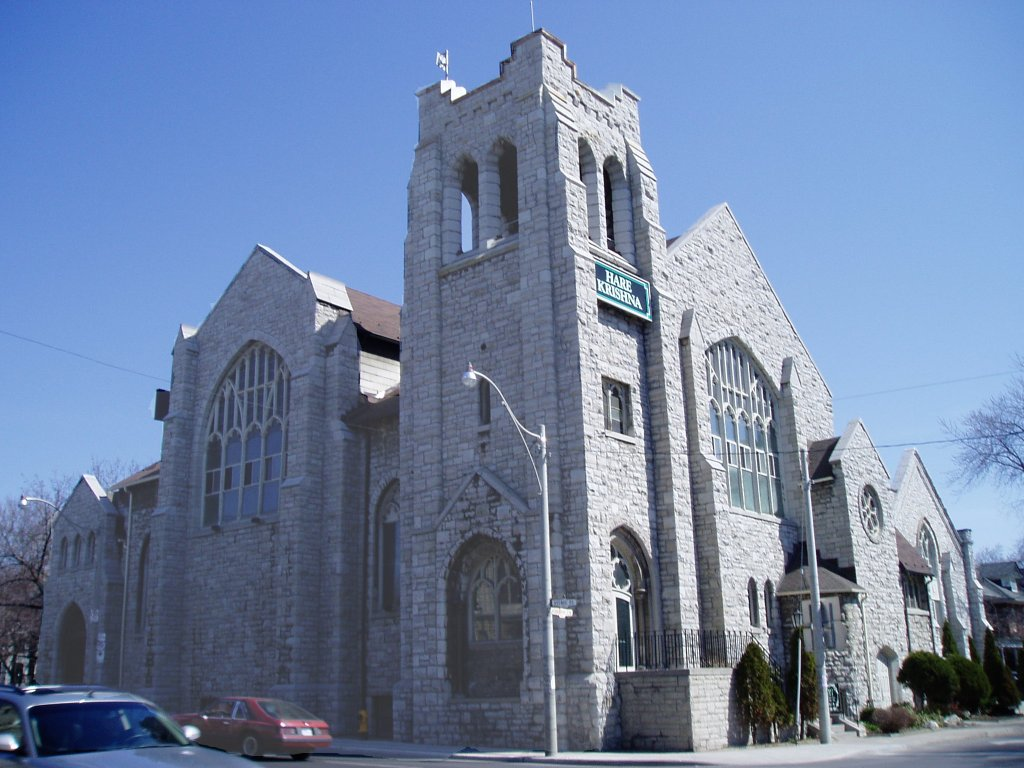
The Hare Krishna Temple in 2005

The Hare Krishna Temple (also known as ISKCON Toronto) is located at 243 Avenue Road in Toronto, Ontario, Canada. The building is the former home of the Avenue Road Church. It is now one of Canada's largest Hare Krishna places of worship.

The building was designed in the Gothic Revival style by the Toronto architectural firm of Gordon & Helliwell. It was built in 1899 and was originally the Presbyterian Church of the Covenant. It was bought by the International Society for Krishna Consciousness (ISKCON) around 1976.

== See also ==
- International Society for Krishna Consciousness
- A. C. Bhaktivedanta Swami Prabhupada
