= The Great Hall =

Venue in Toronto

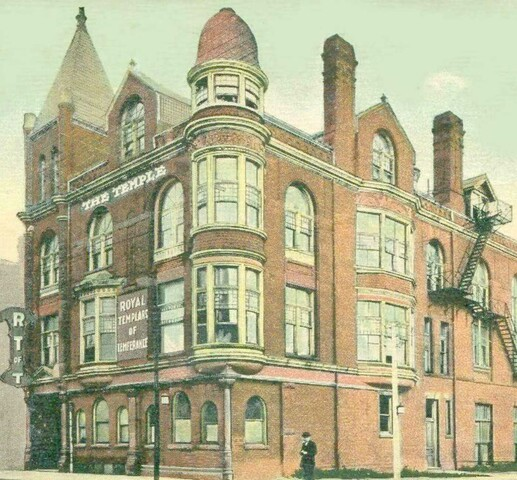
- The Great Hall in 1913

General information
- Architectural style: Victorian; Queen Anne Revival
- Location: 1087 Queen Street West, Toronto, Ontario, Canada
- Coordinates: 43°38′36″N 79°25′20″W
- Construction started: November 13, 1889
- Inaugurated: October 9, 1890
- Cost: Less than C$30,000, C$4 million (restoration)

Height
- Height: 46 feet (14 metres)

Dimensions
- Diameter: 50 by 130 ft (15 by 40 m)

Design and construction
- Architect: Gordon & Helliwell

Website
- www.thegreathall.ca

The Great Hall is a music and cultural events venue in Toronto, Ontario, Canada. Built in 1889 by Gordon & Helliwell for the West End branch of the Toronto Young Men's Christian Association, the building has served as the headquarters of several organizations throughout its history, including the Royal Templars of Temperance, the Independent Order of Foresters, and the Polish National Union. It underwent a significant restoration project by Triangle Development that was completed in 2016 and reopened as an events venue in September of that year. Following its restoration, The Great Hall serves as a venue for corporate events, weddings, concerts, and cultural events, including the Toronto Fashion Week.

== Building ==
The Great Hall is a High Victorian building with Queen Anne Revival architectural features located at 1087 Queen Street West in Toronto, Canada. The building is three-storeys high with a basement and attic, measuring 46 feet (14 m) high from ground to tip of the roof. The exterior facade is mostly made of red brick with coloured joints, with the sills and lintels of the windows and doors made of brown stone. It has a slated roof and a tower on the east end of the Queen Street front which is also slated and topped with a flagpole. The corner features rounded oriel windows that project out on the second and third floors and are topped by an ogee roof. An oriel window on the second floor can also be found in the middle of the Queen Street front, and oriel windows on the second and third floor are located on the Dovercourt Road side. A dormer window is located between the tower and ogee roof on the Queen Street side and a similar dormer window above the oriel windows can be found on the Dovercourt Road side, flanked by two chimneys.

The Queen Street front features the main entrance which is 10 ft (3.0 m) wide with pilasters on either side. The interior includes four event spaces. The Main Hall takes up much of the second and third floors and has an elevated stage and a horseshoe-shaped balcony. The Main Hall measures 10,000 square feet (930 m^{2}) with capacity for 460 people. Adjacent to the Main Hall on the second floor is the Conversation Room which includes the rounded oriel window in one corner and a dormer window in the middle which looks out over Queen Street. The Conversation Room is 1,200 sq ft (110 m^{2}) and has capacity for 117 people.

Above the Conversation Room is the Drawing Room on the third floor which also features a rounded oriel window but does not have a dormer window like the Conversation Room. The Drawing Room measures 1,200 sq ft (110 m^{2}) and has capacity for 97 people. The Longboat Hall has its own entrance on Dovercourt Road and is located on the ground floor. The space includes a balcony – part of what used to be the indoor running track. It has exposed brick walls and the original wood running track floor on the balcony. The Longboat Hall measures 5,000 sq ft (460 m^{2}) with capacity for 400 people.

== History ==
=== West End Y.M.C.A. ===
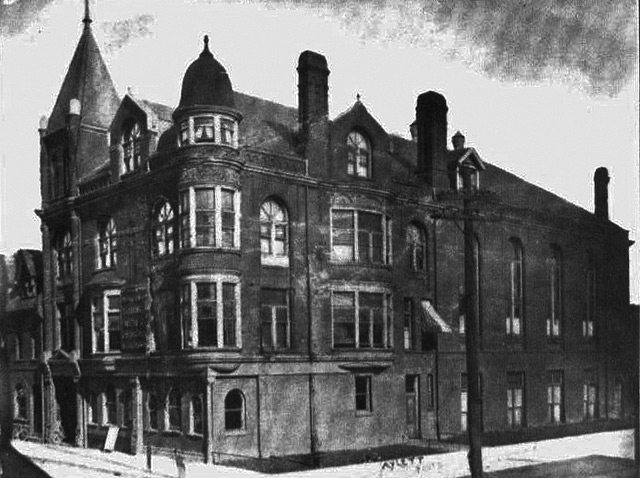
West End Y.M.C.A., c. 1908–1912

The West End branch of the Toronto Young Men's Christian Association began searching for a site to erect a building in 1887. The organization, founded in 1882, initiated a subscription fundraiser that, by late 1888, had raised C$14,000. Around the same timeframe, West End Y.M.C.A. acquired a lot measuring 50 by 130 ft (15 by 40 m) on the corner of Queen Street West and Dovercourt Road, and engaged a firm, Gordon & Helliwell, to design a building that would cost no more than C$30,000.

S. J. Moore, chairman of the West End Y.M.C.A., laid the cornerstone for the building on November 13, 1889, and the construction completed in less than a year. The building was dedicated on October 9, 1890, and served as a gymnasium featuring a bowling alley, running track and library on the lower level with the main assembly hall on the upper level. The gymnasium is said to be the location of some of the earliest games of basketball. It was also a training facility used by Tom Longboat, a Onondaga runner who later won the 1907 Boston Marathon and competed in the marathon at the 1908 Summer Olympics.

=== Royal Templars and the Independent Order of Foresters ===
By May 1912, the West End Y.M.C.A. had begun construction on a new building located at the corner of College Street and Dovercourt Road. Its former building on Queens Street West was sold to the Royal Templars of Temperance on May 20, 1912, for a price between C$30,000 and C$35,000. Soon after, the Royal Templars elected to consolidate their offices and move their headquarters from Hamilton, Ontario, to their newly acquired building which they were due to take possession of in October 1912.

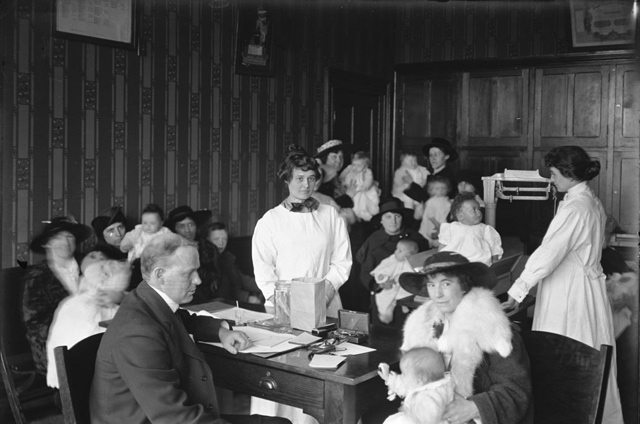
Well-baby clinic, March 26, 1918

The Royal Templars renovated the building into a convention hall with a banquet room and offices. Then known as the Royal Templar Hall, the building was the site of cultural and political events, such as lectures, entertainment, and a "well-baby" clinic. In 1920, Albert Durrant Watson, the author of the spiritualism book The Twentieth Plane, promoted his book by hosting a psychic event on Boxing Day at the venue. In 1929, the Royal Templar Hall hosted a debate between Sam McBride and Bert Wemp in the election for Mayor of Toronto.

On June 2, 1931, the Royal Templars of Temperance was merged into the Independent Order of Foresters (IOF) and the building came into the possession of the latter fraternal order. After being renovated again, the building was rededicated as the IOF's headquarters in February 1933. The IOF eventually moved its headquarters to a different building on the corner of Bay Street and Richmond Street.

=== Polish National Union ===
The Polish National Union, an organization founded in 1930 and took in Polish refugees during the Second World War, acquired the building in the early 1940s. It served as the headquarters of the organization and the publishing house for its weekly newspaper, the Polish Voice. The Polish National Union hosted events featuring Polish and Slavic culture, including a fundraiser during the war for the Aid to Russia Fund and later a 25th anniversary celebration of the organization in 1955 when it had grown to a membership of more than 2,000 families.

The building continued to host events for the Polish National Union until as late as 1971. It was designated a historic heritage site by Heritage Toronto.

=== Recent history ===
From the mid-1980s, the building housed several artistic organizations. For a period in the 1990s, it was known as Ceilidh Arts Centre before becoming known by its current name, The Great Hall. In the 1990s, it housed the Toronto Art School. Resident organizations during subsequent periods included the Music Gallery, which featured experimental music, Theatre Centre, for staged productions, and YYZ Gallery, which exhibited visual arts.

Steve Metlitski and his firm Triangle Development acquired the building and completed a C$4-million restoration. For a few decades before its recent restoration, the building had gone into disrepair. The restoration took two years and included the installation of an elevator to allow accessibility and a new cooling system. Following completion of the project in August 2016, the building was reopened the following month.

In October 2017, the restoration of The Great Hall received the William Greer Architectural Conservation and Craftsmanship Award from Heritage Toronto in the Honourable Mention category reserved for smaller projects. Since its restoration, the venue has played host to a number of cultural events in Toronto, including the Toronto Fashion Week. It also serves as a venue for events such as concerts, weddings, and corporate gatherings. In 2024 it provided as the venue for the 2024 Candidates Tournament. In recent history, it has been home to a popular recurring concert jam series, dubbed "Listening Room", taking place in the Longboat Hall.
