= Avenue Road, Toronto =

Major north–south street in Toronto, Ontario

Avenue Road
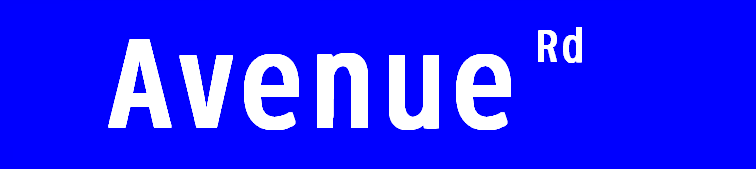
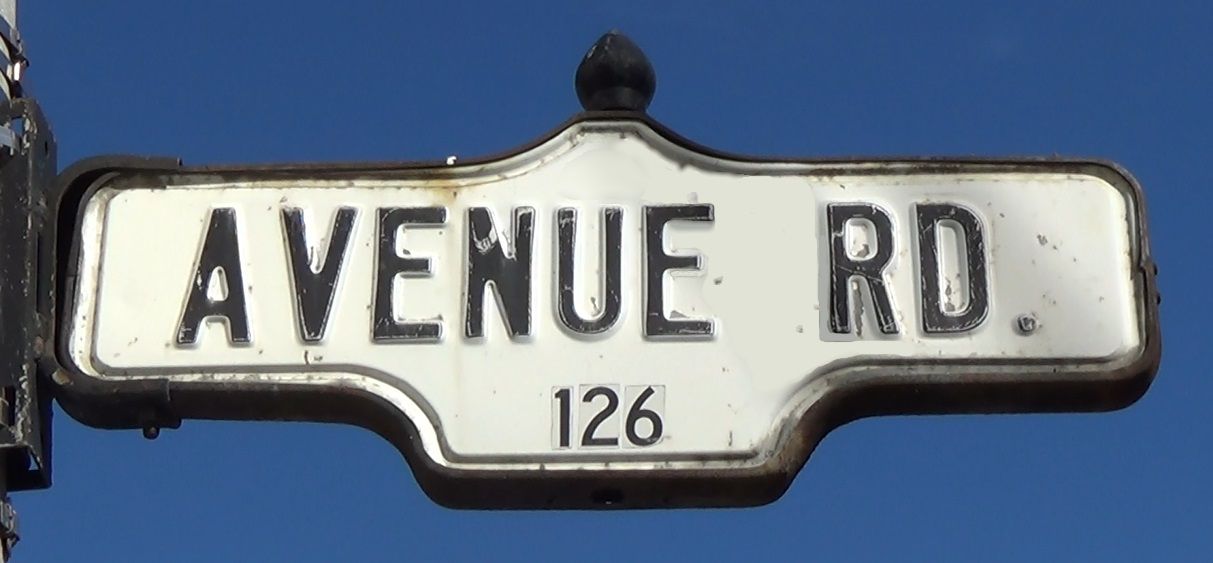
.

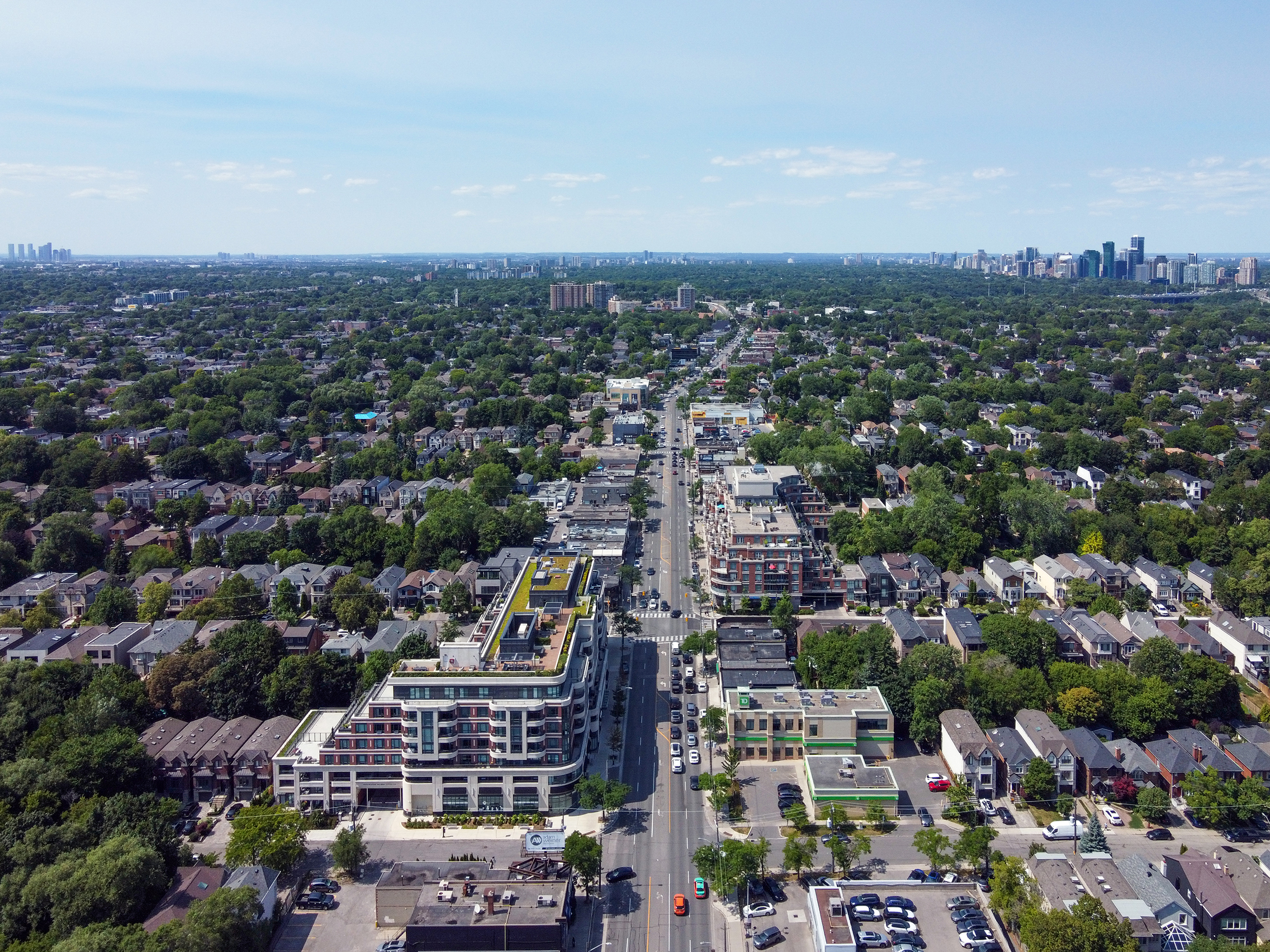
- Avenue Road in North York (2025)

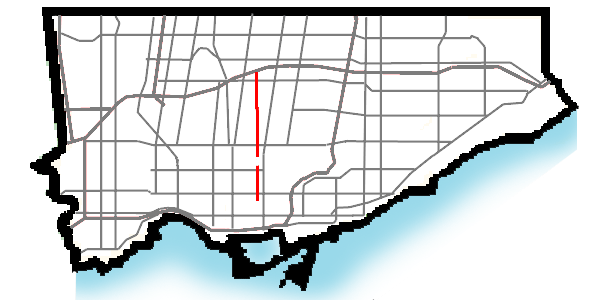
- Maintained by: City of Toronto government
- Length: 9.0 km (5.6 mi)
- Location: Toronto
- South end: Bloor Street (continues as University Avenue)
- Major junctions: St. Clair Avenue; Eglinton Avenue; Lawrence Avenue; Wilson Avenue; Highway 401
- North end: Bombay Avenue

Other
Nearby arterial roads in Toronto
← Bathurst Street	Yonge Street →

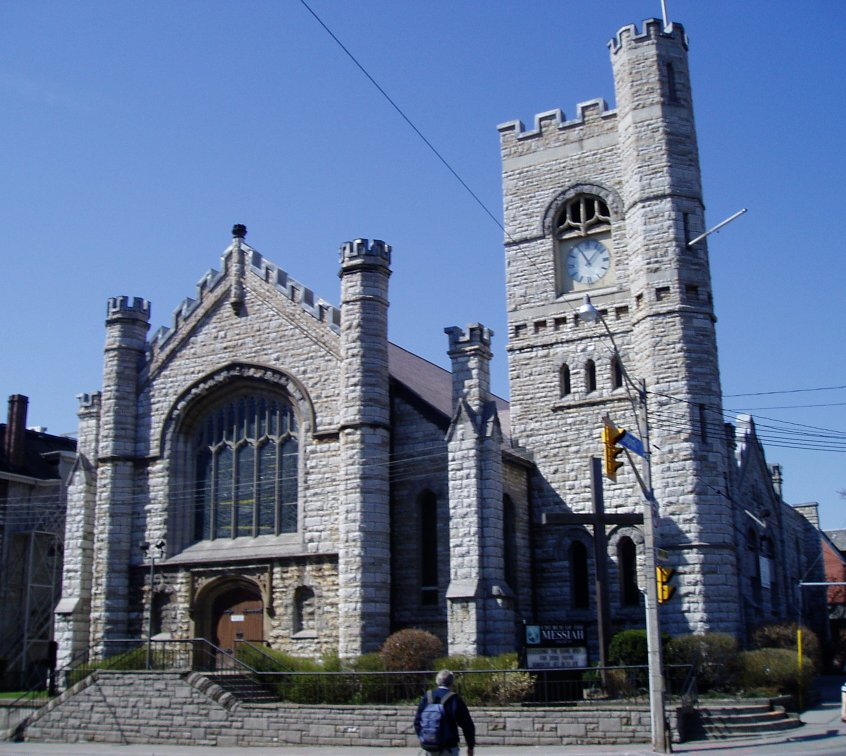
The Anglican Church of the Messiah on Avenue Road.

Avenue Road is a major north–south street in Toronto, Ontario. The road is a continuation of University Avenue, linked to it via Queen's Park and Queen's Park Crescent East and West to form a single through route. Until January 1, 1998, these roads were designated Highway 11A.

== Route ==
Avenue Road is the western limit of the former village of Yorkville, officially beginning at Bloor Street and ending just north of Highway 401. At its southern terminus, it runs between two tall buildings – the Park Hyatt hotel (on the northwest corner of Bloor and Avenue Road) and the Renaissance Plaza condominium complex. On the northeast corner of the intersection with Bloor is the Church of the Redeemer.

For much of its length, the road is fairly residential, with a mix of small businesses, as well as a few large schools and churches. A notable building along the road's lower section is the Hare Krishna Temple (formerly the Avenue Road Church), opposite Dupont Street and across the street from the Anglican Church of the Messiah.

Just north of St. Clair Avenue, Avenue Road is interrupted by Upper Canada College, stopping at Lonsdale Road and resuming again at Kilbarry Road. The primary traffic route runs east of the school, following widened sections of Lonsdale Road and Oriole Parkway, then returning to Avenue Road via Oxton Avenue. (The short section of Avenue Road from Kilbarry to Oxton is an ordinary two-lane side street.)

North of Eglinton Avenue, the former St. James-Bond Church once stood. This building, which used to house two prime downtown congregations – St. James Square (formerly Presbyterian), and Bond Street (formerly Congregationalist) – was built in the late 1920s and closed in June 2005. It has since been demolished. Near Lawrence Avenue is Havergal College, a private girls' school. Although located in the former city of North York, much of the area considers the school to be part of North Toronto.

Avenue Road ends at Bombay Avenue, just after crossing Highway 401 (exit 367). Originally, Avenue Road continued from what is now the interchange by angling northeast via the Hogg's Hollow Bridge (across the Don River West Branch) to end at Yonge Street. However, this section of the road was incorporated into Highway 401 when it was constructed during the 1950s.

A few miles north of Toronto's Avenue Road, there is a separate Avenue Road (which is not considered a resumption after a break such as the case with streets like Kipling or Woodbine Avenues that have separate sections in York Region) in the Yonghurst neighbourhood of Richmond Hill, running almost due north of the Toronto one. This roadway is a residential route from Edgar Avenue to Weldrick Road West.

== Name ==
The thoroughfare's name sounds tautological or self-contradictory from a North American perspective, where avenue is one of the most common generic designations for street names; Robert Fulford once wrote that it "sounded like an identity crisis with pavement". However, Avenue Road is a common street name elsewhere in the English-speaking world, notably Avenue Road, Bangalore, and in London, where at least 40 streets bear this name. In British English, an avenue is a row of trees, hence Avenue Road denotes a street lined with trees.

A common urban legend about the origin of the name goes as follows: A team of Scottish surveyors were surveying the old town of York and came to a spot on Bloor Street. The leader of the group then pointed north and exclaimed, "Let's 'ave a new road!"

== Public Transit ==
Public transit along Avenue Road is provided by the Toronto Transit Commission, on two, formerly three, different bus routes. The two main full-service routes are the 13 Avenue Road, and the 61 Avenue Road North, which provide service south and north of Eglinton Avenue respectively. The former originates from Eglinton station and takes commuters into downtown, and the latter originates from a bus loop at the northern end (Bombay Avenue) and feeds into Eglinton station. There was also an express route, 142 Avenue Road Express, which ran the length of the road, for a direct ride into downtown and the Financial District. It ran during rush hours only and required a double fare, however after the pandemic hit, it was permanently discontinued, along with the rest of the Downtown Express routes, according to the TTC's 2024 Annual Service Report.

== Landmarks (from south to north) ==
Landmark	Cross street	Notes	Image
Queen's Park	Queens Park Cres		
Emmanuel College	Queens Park Cres		
University of Toronto Faculty of Law	Queens Park Cres		
Museum subway station	Queens Park Cres	University-Spadina line	
Annesley Hall	Bloor St	University of Toronto residence	
Gardiner Museum	Bloor St		
McLaughlin Planetarium	Bloor St	Closed, and to be demolished	
Royal Ontario Museum	Bloor St		
Park Hyatt Toronto	Bloor St	Luxury hotel	
Church of the Redeemer	Bloor St		
Renaissance Plaza	Bloor St	Condominium complex	
Yorkville	Bloor St	Upscale shopping district	
Yorkville Plaza	Yorkville Ave	Condominium building (formerly the Four Seasons Hotel)	
Yorkville Village	Yorkville Ave	Shopping mall (previously Hazelton Lanes)	
Hare Krishna Temple	Dupont St	Formerly Avenue Road Church	
Church of the Messiah	Dupont St		
De La Salle College	St Clair		
Deer Park United Church	St Clair	Closed since 2010	
Upper Canada College	Lonsdale Road	Avenue Road is interrupted by UCC	
Marshall McLuhan Catholic Secondary School	Eglinton Ave		
Havergal College	Lawrence Ave		
Armour Heights Public Library	Wilson Ave		
