= Church of the Messiah (Toronto) =

Coordinates: 43.676916°N 79.397866°W

The Church of the Messiah
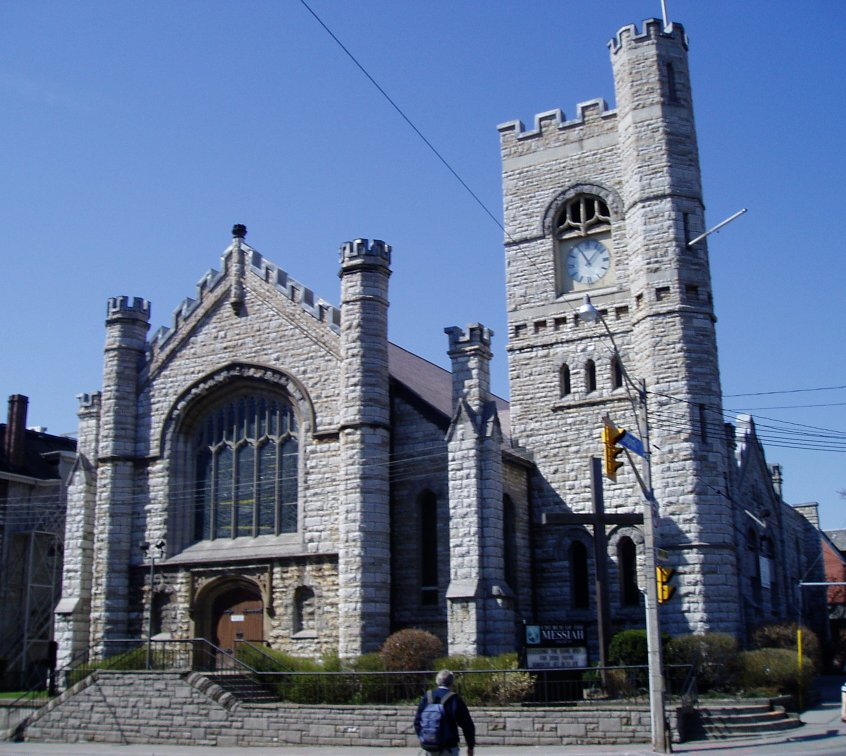
- The church building in 2005
- The Church of the Messiah
- Location: 240 Avenue Road; Toronto, Ontario; M5R 2J4
- Denomination: Anglican Church of Canada
- Website: churchofthemessiah.ca

History
- Dedication: Messiah

Architecture
- Architect: Gordon & Helliwell
- Style: Scottish Baronial

Administration
- Province: Ontario
- Diocese: Toronto

The Church of the Messiah is an Anglican church in Toronto, Ontario, Canada. It is located at 240 Avenue Road, on the corner of Dupont Street. The church was founded on March 24, 1891, by members of the Church of the Redeemer further south on Avenue Road. The building was designed by Gordon & Helliwell, along with a rectory next door (which has not been owned by the church for many years).

The church suffered a major fire in 1976 that gutted the building and destroyed the parish hall next door. The fire was determined to be arson by Toronto police and the perpetrator was convicted and jailed. The church was rebuilt preserving the original exterior appearance, however the interior was radically redesigned to maximize flexibility. As a result, the Church of The Messiah has a liturgical space that can be configured in several different ways. During the week the space is used for worship, community meetings, a food bank, a daycare, and rehearsal / performance space.

Historically, the Church of the Messiah was a bastion of the low-church Anglicanism in Canada. Every Rector (or Incumbent) prior to the most current one was a graduate of Wycliffe College. Several of these were noted preachers and two went on to become bishops. Currently, the church is known for a creative worship style, diverse congregation, food access programs for the neighbourhood (including the Avenue Road Food Bank). The Messiah was home to the Bell Tower Café (closed in 2019).

The current Incumbent is the Rev'd Elivered Mulongo, assistant pastor is Rev. Canon John Hill, and Sarah John serves as minister of musqic.

== See also ==
- List of Anglican churches in Toronto
