= Rouge River Bridge =

- Coordinates: 43°48′14″N 79°08′06″W
- Carries: 14 lanes of Highway 401
- Crosses: Rouge River
- Locale: Toronto and Pickering (Durham Region), Ontario, Canada
- Maintained by: Ontario Ministry of Transportation

Characteristics
- Design: Deck truss bridge, girder bridge
- Total length: 170 metres (560 ft)
- Width: 14 lanes
- Clearance below: Rouge River

History
- Opened: 1941, rebuilt in 1971 (inner spans); 1994 (outer spans)

Statistics
- Daily traffic: 230,000

Location
- Interactive map of Rouge River Bridge

Rouge River Bridge is a series of 170 metres (560 ft) spans carrying traffic on Highway 401 (Ontario) over the Rouge River (Ontario).

It is technically not a single bridge, but rather several spans of highway overpasses over the Rouge River. Parts of the original bridges (built 1941–1942) during the initial construction of Highway 401 remain next to the spans added after the 1970s.

The inner or express spans were built in 1971 and the outer or collector spans were completed in 1994 as part of the widening of the highway between Pickering and Scarborough. Both spans are Girder bridges. The spans carry 12 lanes of traffic in total, and run parallel to a section of Kingston Road that spans across the Rouge River on the north side.

This is one of the least busy sections of the Highway 401 in Toronto carrying around 230,000 vehicles on average per weekday.

== See also ==
- Hogg's Hollow Bridge
