= Bayview Glen Church =

- Location in Markham, Ontario, at the border with Toronto
- 43°48′16″N 79°23′42.5″W
- Location: Thornhill, Markham, Ontario
- Country: Canada
- Denomination: Evangelicalism
- Previous denomination: Church of the Nazarene
- Website: www.bayviewglen.org

History
- Former name: Avenue Road Church
- Founded: 1941
- Consecrated: March 1978

Clergy
- Pastor(s): Terry Sanderson, Sawyer Bullock, Sean Luellwitz, Dave Lewis, Beverley Deguire, Min-Soo Kang

Bayview Glen Church is an evangelical church in Toronto, Ontario, Canada, in the Thornhill neighbourhood, at North East corner of Bayview and Steeles. It is part of the Christian and Missionary Alliance in Canada. The congregation began in 1941 and moved to its present building in March 1978.

== History ==
Founded in 1941 by Charles Bradley Templeton (1941–1948), an itinerant evangelist, under the Nazarene denomination. Services began in a large stone church on Avenue Road, with approximately 112 people in attendance. The church was eventually named The Avenue Road Church. Rev. J.D. Carlson (1948–1951), a former American evangelist, took over from Charles Templeton. In 1950 the church became affiliated with the Christian and Missionary Alliance, which began a strong emphasis on missions within the church.

Rev. Donald Shepson (1952–1959) focused on building a family oriented congregation. Then Rev. Dr. Aiden Wilson (A.W.) Tozer (1959–1963), a self taught theologian, writer, and editor of Alliance Witness magazine became the Sunday preaching pastor when not preaching in the United States. Tozer's books have ministered in many languages to millions of Christians. Rev. G Robert Gray was Senior Pastor serving alongside Dr. Tozer from 1959 to 1962 before leaving to found Brimley Rd Alliance Church in Scarborough. Rev. Kenn Opperman (1963–1970), a missionary leader, emphasized the needs of the mission field. He returned to Bayview Glen Church in 1992–1993 on an interim basis after his successor Arnold Reimer's resignation.

The Rev. Arnold Reimer (1970–1991) helped to relocate the congregation from Avenue Road Church to its present location. In 1973, Avenue Road Church was sold, and 6.2 acres (2.5 ha) of land at the corner of Bayview Avenue and Steeles Avenue in Thornhill was purchased. The first service in the building was held in March 1978. Pastor Reimer led the congregation until 31 July 1991.

The Rev. Dr. Nelson J. Annan, D.Min. (1994–2006) led the church into two morning services, a building expansion and the birthing of a daughter church: Summit Community Church, in nearby Richmond Hill, under the direction of Rev. Gerry Gould. Rev. Annan's tenure in Bayview Glen included the creation of a third service ("Higher Ground") that in the gymnasium that features a cooked breakfast, and the facilities of the church were made available for more conventions and fellowship gatherings. Annan believed in multiculturalism and it was during Annan's pastoral lead when Bayview Glen was transformed from a predominantly homogenous cultural church to a heterogenous one, encompassing peoples from many different nations of birth and cultures. He resigned at the end of April 2006 and was accepted as a Senior Pastor in Harvest Hills Alliance Church, Calgary, Alberta. The Board of Elders restructured the senior pastoral post in 2006 forming a leadership triad: the Lead Pastor (LP), the Teaching/Preaching Pastor (TPP), and the Administrative Pastor (AP). Summit Community Church's lead pastor Gerry Gould's father, the Rev. Robert "Bob" Gould, a long time missionary in Thailand, took over as the Interim Teaching/Preaching Pastor and the Rev. David Loucks as the AP.

Bayview Glen Church has become one of the largest Christian and Missionary Alliance congregations in Canada. As of July 2024 the pastoral team includes Terry Sanderson, Sawyer Bullock, Dave Lewis, Beverley Deguire, Min-Soo Kang and Sean Luellwitz. After Lucas Cooper left the church in early 2021, the search committee hired Terry Sanderson in mid 2022.

== Clergy ==
Picture	Role	Name	Description
	Senior Pastor I (1941–1948)	Charles Bradley Templeton	-.
	Senior Pastor II (1948–1951)	J.D. Carlson	-.
	Senior Pastor III (1952–1959)	Donald Shepson	-.
	Senior Pastor V (1959–1963)	Dr. Aiden Wilson Tozer	-.
	Senior Pastor VI (1963–1970), interim-leadership in 1992–1993	Kenn W. Opperman	-.
	Senior Pastor VII (1970–1991)	Arnold Reimer	-.
	Senior Pastor VIII (1994–2006)	Nelson J. Annan	-.
	Interim Teaching/Preaching Pastor (2006)	Robert Gould	-.
	Lead Pastor (2009–2011)	Steve Irvin	-.
	Interim Pastor (2011–2013)	Dave Lewis Sr	-.
	Lead Pastor (2013–2021)	Lucas Cooper	-.
	Lead Pastor (2022–Present)	Terry Sanderson	-.

The 'Senior Pastor' role was abolished at the retirement of Annan in 2006, and replaced with a triad of pastors in leadership: Lead Pastor, Teaching/Preaching Pastor, and Administrative Pastor. Since the Senior Pastors in the past all had been responsible for teaching and preaching (primarily), the Teaching/Preaching Pastors' names are noted. The Lead Pastor role was reinstated in 2013.
