= Queen's School of Religion =

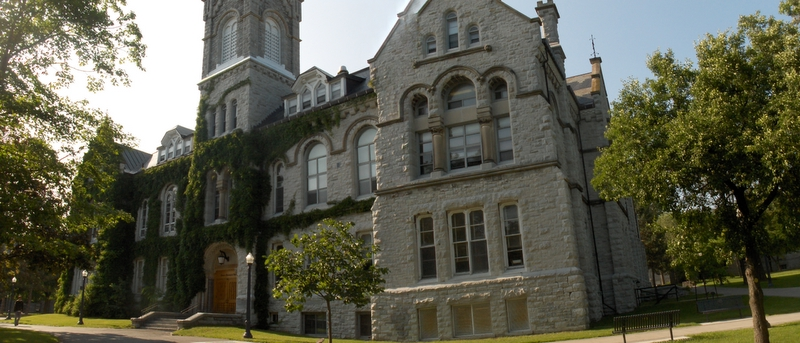
- Theological Hall, home of the School of Religion
- Former name: Queen's Theological College
- Motto: Sapientia et Doctrina Stabilitas
- Motto in English: Wisdom and knowledge shall be the stability of thy times
- Type: Seminary
- Established: October 16, 1841
- Affiliations: Queen's University at Kingston, ATS
- Director: Richard S. Ascough
- Academic staff: 14
- Location: Kingston, Ontario, Canada; 44.224997°N 76.495099°W
- Website: www.queensu.ca/religion

Queen's School of Religion, formerly Queen's Theological College, is a school of religious studies affiliated with Queen's University at Kingston. The school is located on the Queen's University campus and graduates receive their degrees from Queen's University. It is accredited by the Association of Theological Schools in the United States and Canada.

== Mission ==
Queen's School of Religion administers the Department of Religious Studies on behalf of Queen's University, and is responsible for training people in the academic study of religion, and educating theological students for academic training and ordained ministry in the Christian faith tradition.

== History ==
Queen's College was founded in 1841 when the Presbyterian Church in Canada obtained a Royal Charter from Queen Victoria. When Queen's College opened its doors in 1842, there were 11 male students. In 1911, the Faculty of Theology was separated from Queen's College when the latter became the newly named secular institution Queen's University at Kingston in order to qualify for government education funding. Queen's Theological College was created by an Act of Parliament on April 1, 1912, as a training institution of the Presbyterian Church of Canada. Queen's Theological College entered the newly formed United Church of Canada upon the Union of the Presbyterian, Congregational, and Methodist Churches in Canada in 1925. Queen's Theological College became Queen's School of Religion on January 1, 2010, housing both the Department of Religious Studies and theological programs under one organisation.

In 1925, Queen's Theological College became one of the institutions for theological training for the newly formed United Church of Canada. As Queen's School of Religion, it remains one of six schools in The United Church of Canada with primary responsibility for educating persons for ordained ministry and is fully accredited by the Association of Theological Schools in the United States and Canada.

In November 2015, due to a decline in new admissions, the Queen's University theological programs were closed.

== Features and Facilities ==
Although officially a separate institution, Queen's School of Religion is the only affiliated college of Queen's University at Kingston and is located in one of the oldest historic university buildings, Theological Hall, in the heart of the Queen's campus.

Theological Hall was built in 1879 and designed by Gordon & Helliwell. Entirely funded by donations from the citizens of Kingston, the cornerstone of Theological Hall was laid in 1879 by the Marquis of Lorne, Governor-General of Canada, and his wife, Princess Louise, the fourth daughter of Queen Victoria, and the building was completed in October 1880. The third-oldest building on the Queen's University campus, the massive limestone structure was built in Norman Romanesque style, featuring its trademark double-oak front doorway and central tower flying the Canadian flag. Originally built to house the Faculty of Arts and Science (and to this day is often referred to as the Old Arts and Science Building), Theological Hall was the university's main building throughout the late 19th century. The building features an ornate mediaeval-style Convocation Hall that served the university for convocation ceremonies until Grant Hall was built (between 1902 and 1905), and at one time a circular library at the west end of the building. Morgan Memorial Chapel, with its old-world vaulted ceilings and ecclesiastical stained-glass windows depicting scenes from the Hebrew Scriptures and the New Testament, was named in honour of the late professor of Theology, William Morgan, and serves the entire university community.

The interior of Convocation Hall is a mix of Romanesque and Gothic with an open, cathedral-like space featuring king-post hammer beam truss enlivened with embellished pendants and articulated bossed junctions, and a combination of red brick and buff brick incorporated into a decorative pattern. The side walls feature a series of round-arched windows, and the centre of the north wall features a rose window set in a Romanesque niche, which was unfortunately concealed from the interior by renovations in the mid-1960s.

Classroom and office space in Theological Hall was provided for the newly created Queen's Theological College under the provisions of an Act of Parliament respecting Queen's College at Kingston passed on April 1, 1912. From 1912 to 1925, Queen's Theological College prepared students for ordered ministry in the Presbyterian Church of Canada, but the college was transformed from a Presbyterian institution into a United Church of Canada theological institution serving Canada's new national church created by the union of the Methodist, Congregational, and Presbyterian denominations in Canada in 1925.

Theological Hall underwent major internal renovations between 1966 and 1967, which resulted in the creation of additional office space and the installation of an elevator, and today houses both Queen's School of Religion and Queen's University's Faculty of Arts and Science Department of Drama and the Department of Religious Studies.

== Programs ==
Queen's School of Religion offers the following graduate programs: (Master's degree)

- Master of Arts in Religion and Modernity (through the Department of Religious Studies)
- Master of Divinity
- Master of Divinity with a Concentration in Restorative Justice
- Master of Theological Studies
- Master of Theological Studies in Spiritual and Religious Care in a Pluralist Society
- Certificate in Theological Studies
- Certificate in Spiritual and Religious Care in a Pluralist Society

Queen's School of Religion offers the following undergraduate and non-degree programs (Bachelor's degrees and diploma programs):

- Bachelor of Arts and Honours Bachelor of Arts with concentrations in Religious Studies offered through the Department of Religious Studies
- Bachelor of Theology
- Diploma in Restorative Justice
- Diploma in Transformational Leadership

=== Books ===
- Neatby, Hilda (1978). History of Queen's University Vol I. McGill-Queen's University Press.
- Neatby, Hilda (1983). History of Queen's University Vol II. McGill-Queen's University Press.
- Rawlyk, George & Quinn, Kevin (1980). The Redeemed of the Lord Say So: A History of Queen's Theological College 1912-1972. Queen's Theological College. ISBN 0-88911-016-6.
