= Gordon & Helliwell =

Canadian architectural firm

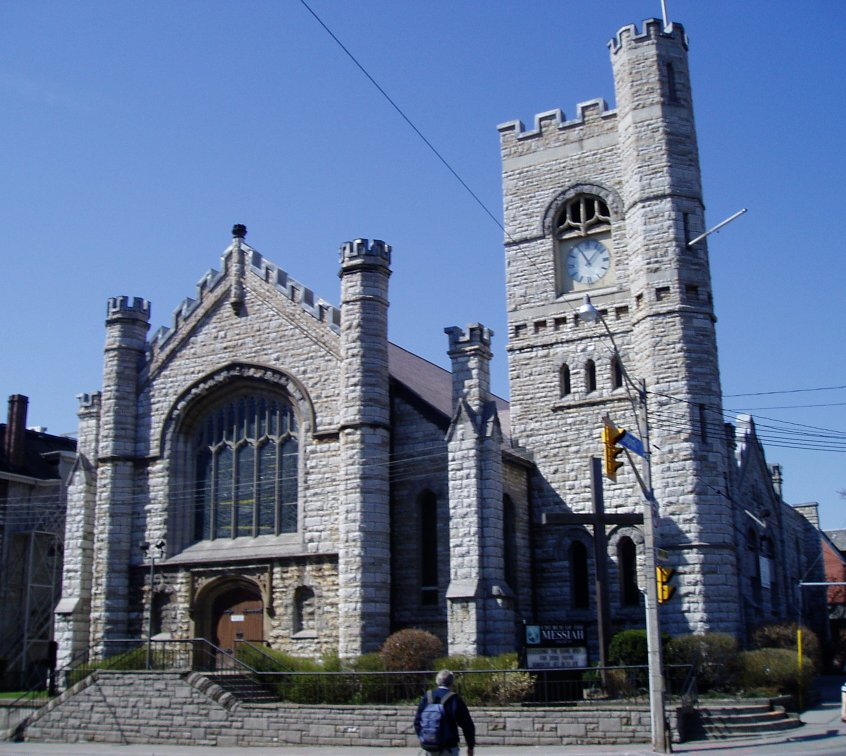
The Church of the Messiah in Toronto

Queen's Theological Hall in Kingston

Gordon & Helliwell was a Canadian architectural firm based in Toronto, Ontario. The principals were Henry Bauld Gordon, RCA, (1854–1951) and Grant Helliwell (1855–1953).

== Selected works ==
- Queen's Theological Hall, Kingston, Ontario, 1879
- Queen's University Kingston, Ontario, Arts Building, Queen's University, 1879-80
- Knox Church (interior), Toronto, Ontario, 1881
- St. Andrew's Presbyterian Church, Brampton, Ontario, 1881
- Upper Canada Bible and Tract Societies, Toronto, Ontario, 1886
- Kilgour Brothers' Building, Toronto, Ontario, 1886
- Bathurst Street Methodist Church, Toronto, Ontario, 1888
- Parkdale Presbyterian Church, Toronto, Ontario, 1888
- The Great Hall, Toronto, Ontario, 1889
- St. Peter's Church (addition), Toronto, Ontario, 1890
- Church of the Messiah, Toronto, Ontario, 1891
- 35 Rosedale Road, Toronto, Ontario, 1891
- Church of the Messiah Rectory, Toronto, Ontario, 1892
- Orillia Opera House (built as Orillia City Hall), Orillia, Ontario, 1895
- Harris Henry Fudger House, Toronto, Ontario, 1897
- 40 Maple Avenue, Toronto, Ontario, 1898
- Avenue Road Church, Toronto, Ontario, 1899
- 49 Elm Avenue, Toronto, Ontario, 1901
- 181 Crescent Road, Toronto, Ontario, 1902
- St. Peter's Anglican Church Rectory, Toronto, Ontario, 1905
- Oaklands (addition), Toronto, Ontario, 1906
- Wycliffe College, Toronto, Dining Hall and Dormitory Wing, 1907; Principal's Residence and new Chapel, 1911.
- Church of the Epiphany, Toronto, Ontario, 1911
- 18 Elm Street, Toronto, Ontario, n.d.
