= Avenue Road Church =

Coordinates: 43.676951°N 79.397112°W

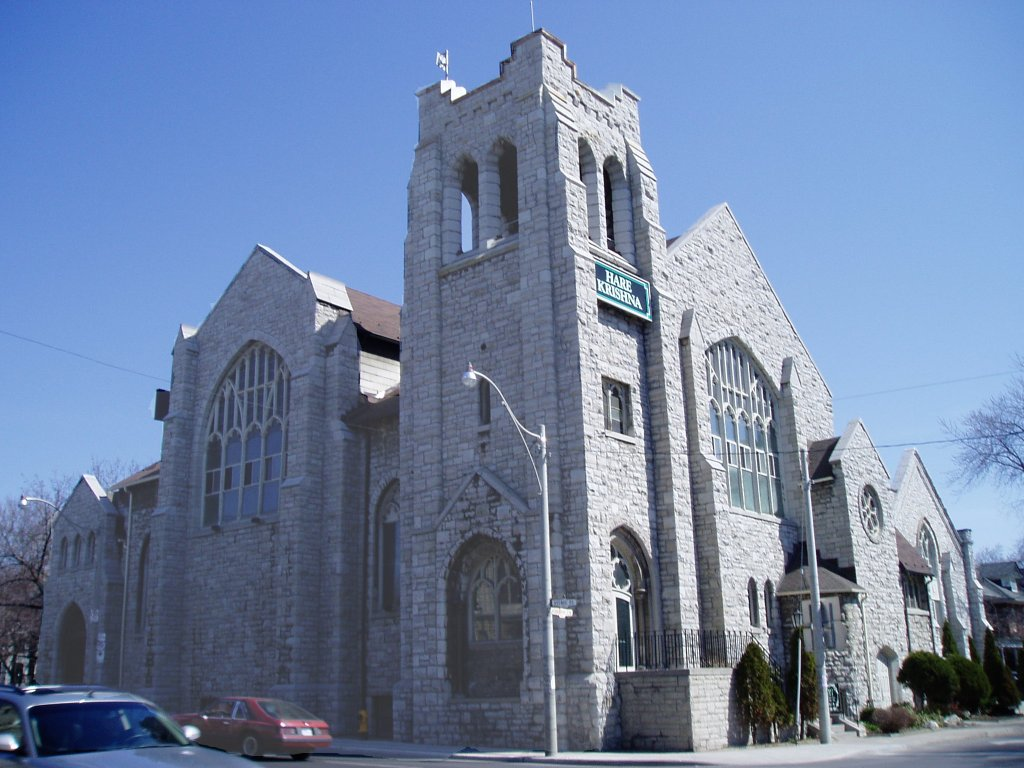
- Avenue Road Church
- Location: 243 Avenue Road; Toronto, Ontario, Canada
- Previous denomination: Presbyterian; United Church of Canada; Church of the Nazarene

Architecture
- Architect: Gordon & Helliwell
- Style: Gothic Revival
- Completed: 1899

The Avenue Road Church is a former church building in Toronto, Ontario, Canada. It is located at 243 Avenue Road, on the northeastern corner of Roxborough Avenue.

Originally the Presbyterian Church of the Covenant, it became the Avenue Road Presbyterian Church then the Avenue Road United Church, and later the Church of the Nazarene. The building now serves as the Toronto Hare Krishna Temple (ISKCON Toronto).

== History ==
Designed in the Gothic Revival style by Gordon & Helliwell and built in 1899, the building was initially the Church of the Covenant. It was renamed the Avenue Road Presbyterian Church around 1908. The Presbyterian congregation joined the United Church of Canada in 1925, thus the church became the Avenue Road United Church.

The church was vacant for several years until Charles Templeton took possession of the church as preacher in 1941. Templeton founded the church as an independent congregation. Templeton and his wife decided to rent the empty building for $100 a month, even without a congregation. Under his leadership, the new independent congregation grew until Templeton went into debt to pay for the construction of a balcony to accommodate their larger numbers. It was soon after the balcony was completed that the structure was severely damaged by fire, in 1944. The building was repaired through donations from supporters across Canada and the United States. The church later became associated with the Christian and Missionary Alliance denomination, after becoming the Church of the Nazarene.

A.W.”Tozer’s last pastorate was at the Avenue Road Church in Toronto, Canada (1959-1963).” [‘The Life of A.W. Tozer: In Pursuit of God’ by James L. Snyder]

In the mid-1970s, the growing congregation left the downtown area to found the Bayview Glen Church in Thornhill, Ontario. During the congregation's move, there was controversy surrounding the sale of the church building to a buyer who represented a Hare Krishna group. After the demolition permit was denied, it has since become Canada's largest Hare Krishna place of worship.
