= Hogg's Hollow Bridge =

Set of four highway bridges in Toronto, Ontario

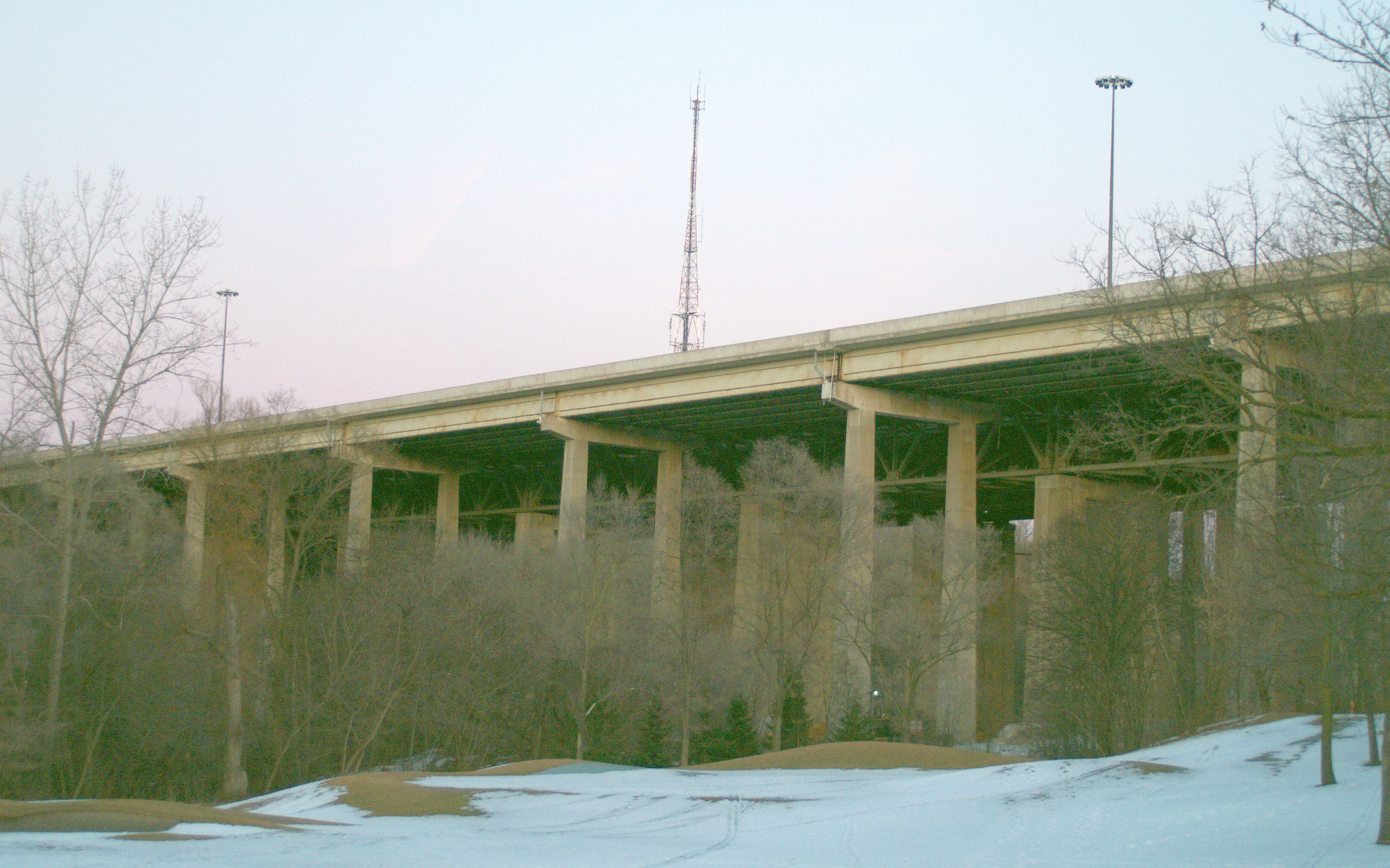
- Coordinates: 43°45′02″N 79°24′46″W
- Carries: 14 lanes of Highway 401
- Crosses: West Branch of Don River
- Locale: Toronto, Ontario, Canada
- Other name: Yonge Boulevard Viaduct
- Maintained by: Ontario Ministry of Transportation

Characteristics
- Design: Deck truss bridge, girder bridge
- No. of spans: 4

History
- Opened: January 5, 1929; 97 years ago

Statistics
- Daily traffic: 360,300 (2019)

Location
- Interactive map of Hogg's Hollow Bridge

Hogg's Hollow Bridge, originally known as the Yonge Boulevard Viaduct, is a set of four separate highway bridges that span the West Branch of the Don River Valley in Toronto, Ontario, Canada, and carries 14 lanes of Highway 401. The four structures are the busiest multi-span bridge crossing in North America, surpassing the Brooklyn Bridge.

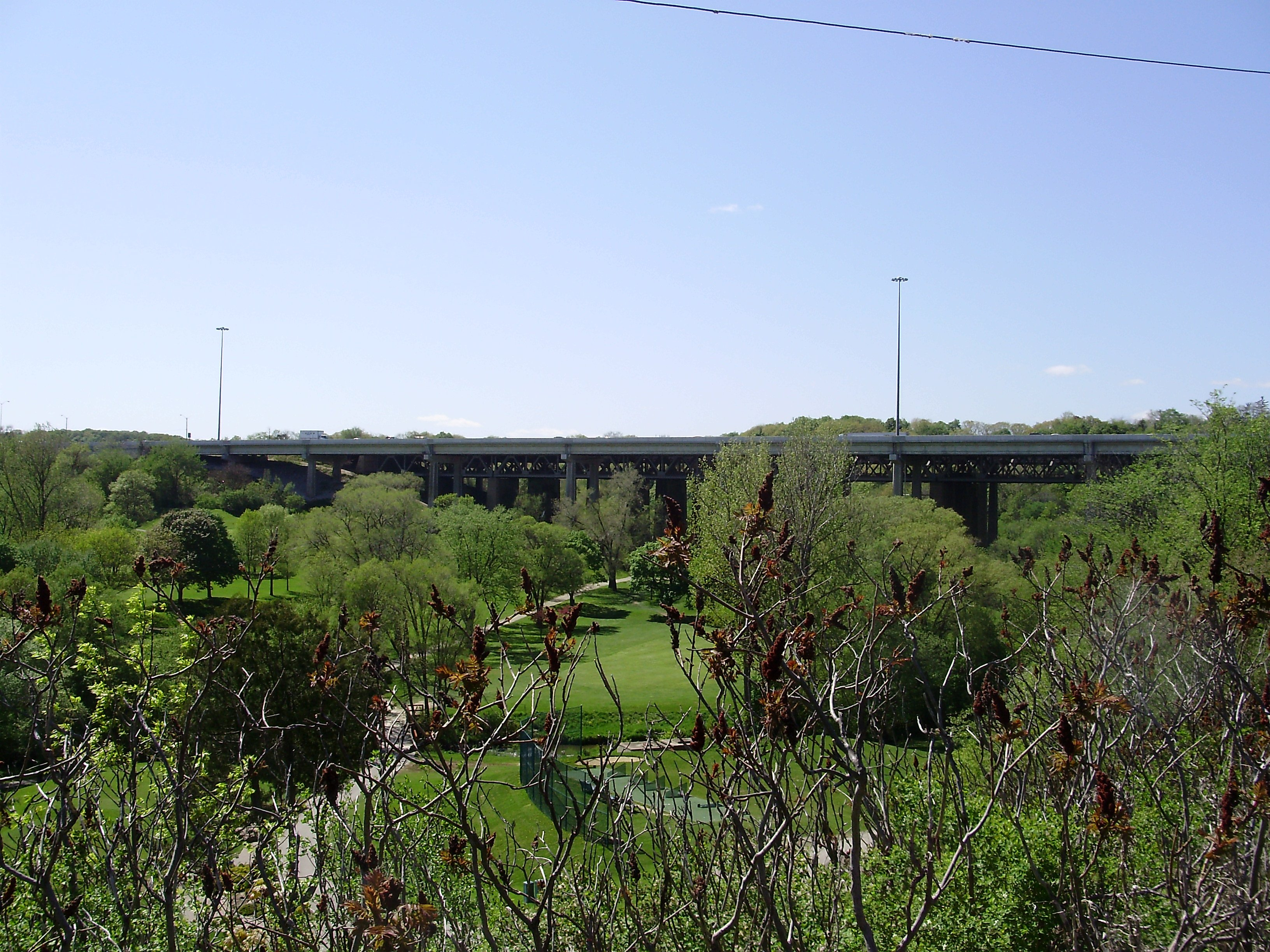
The four-structured Hogg's Hollow Bridge over the Don Valley in Toronto is the busiest multi-structure bridge in North America, surpassing the Brooklyn Bridge.

== Description ==
The Hogg's Hollow Bridge has a 14-lane cross section: 6 collector lanes, 8 express lanes. The road surface and bridge decks require constant maintenance due to the wear and tear from high traffic volumes. Since 2001, an Ontario tall-wall concrete barrier has replaced the steel guide–rail in the median separating eastbound and westbound traffic. The late 1960s conventional truss lights have been replaced by high-mast lighting. Starting from 2002, the westbound collector lanes on the outer north bridge have also undergone rehabilitation (replacing road surface, guard rails and/or concrete barriers). The westbound collector traffic has been rehabilitated; the project included the north side outer bridge and the Yonge Street overpass. Additional high mast lighting was added in late 2009. From 2006 to 2008, the eastbound collector lanes were rebuilt and the reconstruction stretched from east of Avenue Road all the way to Bayview Avenue, encompassing the south side outer bridge and Yonge Street overpass. This did not include the on–ramp junction with Lord Seaton Road. The inner eastbound express lanes will be next on the reconstruction process. Once completed, the entire bridge will use the Ontario tall-wall barrier system.

Due to land constraints of the Valley and the need to accommodate the bridges, the adjacent interchange with Yonge Street is of a modified Parclo design instead of the typical Parclo A4 configuration used on most Ontario freeway junctions. The interchange is also one of the narrower points of Highway 401's collector-express system, not just because of the bridges but also because of the suburbs east of Yonge Street (which forced the province to expropriate land in order to expand that segment of Highway 401). Although there are a total of 14 lanes of traffic on the four bridges, there are only 12 through lanes that cross Yonge Street, as the off–ramps and on–ramps default onto the main lanes instead of being additional deceleration and acceleration lanes.

At the foot of the bridges is the Earl Bales Park and Ski Centre in the north and Don Valley Golf Course to the south, both owned by the City of Toronto. An access road branches off from the westbound on-ramp and travels downward to the valley below and ends in a cul-de-sac just south of the eastbound collector lanes. It is closed to regular vehicular traffic and used by Ontario Ministry of Transportation maintenance crews (and their contractors) as well as housing the Macdonald-Cartier Emergency Service building of the Toronto Transit Commission used for both emergency access to/from track level of the subway but also as an access point for maintenance crews.

The bridges can be clearly seen from Yonge Street looking northwest and north of York Mills Road and Wilson Avenue.

== History ==
The inner under deck truss bridge was constructed beginning in early 1928, and opened on January 5, 1929, providing a much needed bypass of the deep ravine. It also provided a path between Wilson Avenue and York Mills Road. Wilson Avenue's eastern limit was just east of Yonge Boulevard (it was extended to meet York Mills at Yonge St. after 1972). The collector road merged traffic from both Avenue Road and Yonge Boulevard to the bridge to Yonge Street. The Toronto Bypass, today's Highway 401, was routed over the bridge (with an additional south truss bridge added) in December 1952.

The collector (outermost) spans are steel girder bridges, and were opened in December 1965 during the widening of Highway 401 to a collector-express system. The older inner bridge's balustrade railing was replaced with retaining walls (since replaced with tall walls). A conventional lighting system with truss-neck poles was added to the bridges (and the rest of the widened 401) around this time.

=== Bridge rehabilitation ===
Hogg's Hollow Bridge is situated on what is considered to be the most sensitive segment of Highway 401, averaging around 400,000 vehicles a day on weekdays. Given the importance of this segment of Highway 401 through the GTA, the Ministry of Transportation was particularly concerned with the development of construction staging plans and the mitigation of traffic during the rehabilitation of the Hogg's Hollow Bridge. "The impact of delays on passenger and commercial traffic resulting from construction activities on this section of highway were an important consideration.", says Ron Klatt, Department Manager, Contract Administration Group with Morrison Hershfield Ltd., the engineering and management company that designed the project.

In 2008, Morrison Hershfield was retained by the Ministry of Transportation of Ontario (MTO) as the lead consultant for a Total Project Management (TPM) Detailed Design assignment for the rehabilitation of Highway 401 at Hogg's Hollow Bridge. This is deemed to be the most complex portion of the Ministry’s 401 Strategic Rehabilitation Program. Morrison Hershfield carried out the structural rehabilitation of a total of 12 structures including complete deck replacements at the Hogg's Hollow Bridge, rehabilitation of the pavement structure including concrete base repairs, and was responsible for extensive construction staging and traffic management over multiple construction seasons including provision for winter staging and construction shutdown.

The rehabilitation of Hogg's Hollow Bridge is estimated to be an $86-million construction project. Barricade Traffic Services Inc. were in charge of traffic control. The safety needs of the traveling public and workers within the construction zone were met, with minimal disruption to commuters and commercial carriers. Work on the Hogg's Hollow Bridge saw most of the lane closures required done at night to minimize congestion on Canada’s busiest section of highway. The impact of delays on traffic from construction activities on this section of the highway would have been significant if it was not for the detailed construction staging plans and the planned mitigation of traffic impacts that were in place prior to the beginning of the bridge rehabilitation.

The rehabilitation of Hogg's Hollow Bridge was completed in 2012 with transfer from collectors to express restored full access to all lanes in both directions.

== See also ==
- Rouge River Bridge
- List of bridges in Canada
