= Church of the Redeemer (Toronto) =

Anglican church in Ontario, Canada

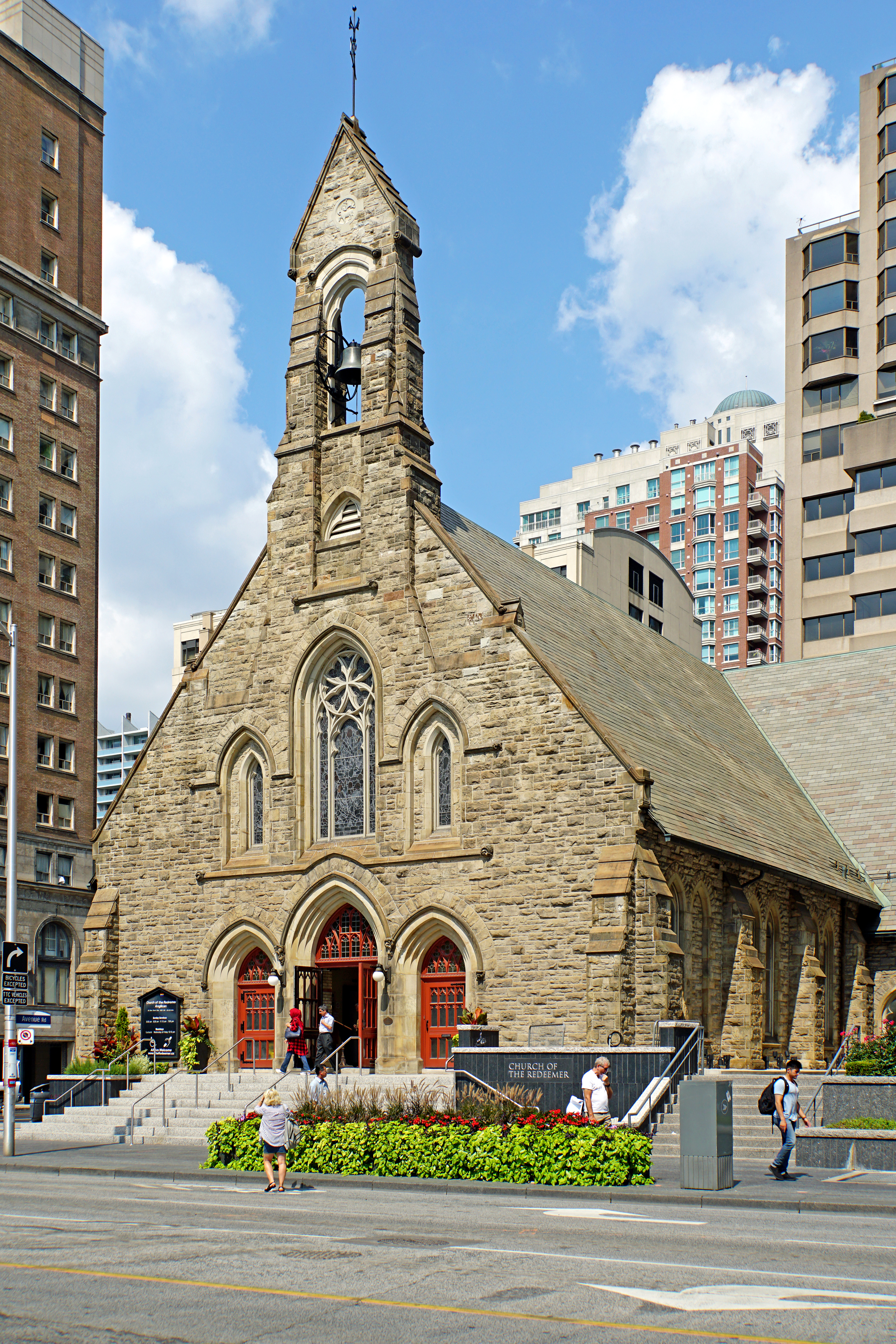
- Front of the church building in 2017
- Church of the Redeemer
- 43.6691°N 79.3940°W
- Location: 162 Bloor Street West; Toronto, Ontario
- Denomination: Anglican Church of Canada
- Website: theredeemer.ca

History
- Dedication: Christ the Redeemer

Architecture
- Architect(s): Smith & Gemmell
- Style: Gothic Revival

Administration
- Province: Ontario
- Diocese: Toronto
- Deanery: St. James

Clergy
- Rector: Steven Mackison
- Priest: Susan Haig

The Church of the Redeemer is an Anglican church in Toronto, Ontario, Canada. The small church is prominently located at the intersection of Bloor Street and Avenue Road, near the Royal Ontario Museum. The Gothic Revival style building opened on June 15, 1879.

== Overview ==
=== Creation ===
The church's creation was a result of the division of the old parish of St. Paul's on April 23, 1867 or in 1871, in order to accommodate a growing congregation. Prior to this, St. Paul's Church on Bloor Street had been the main parish church. Yonge Street was chosen as the dividing line between the old and new parishes, and the name redeemer was based on the metaphor of Christian redemption.

The property for a new church building was purchased at the corner of Bloor and Avenue streets from a Mr. Alcorn for less than $10,000. The first corner stone of the church was laid in 1878 and the church opened for service on June 15, 1879.

=== Recent history ===
The church was granted heritage status by the City of Toronto in 1973. As with many other downtown churches, the Church of the Redeemer suffered from falling attendance in the late twentieth century. The church ran into severe financial difficulties and, in 1979, the parish voluntarily disestablished itself and was taken over by the Anglican Diocese of Toronto. The church lands and air rights were sold to developers and the massive Renaissance Plaza was built on them.

With the money from this deal, the church was again solvent and regained its independence. The money also paid for much needed renovations. In 2000, the church launched a major renovation project as extra meeting space and offices were constructed under the building.

The church is known for its progressive stance on social issues, especially gay rights. In 1998, the congregation published An Honourable Estate: Same Sex Unions and the Church, advocating the blessing of same-sex unions. Integrity Toronto worships in the church. The parish uses exclusively the Book of Alternative Services.

The church is noted by passersby for its prominent sign, often featuring a quotation or thought for meditation. The church is also known to host a range of musical events and concerts. For example, Canadian group Great Lake Swimmers played two shows at the Church of the Redeemer on April 14, 2007.

== Architecture ==
The church was built in a Gothic Revival style with a High Victorian interpretation. It was designed by architects Smith & Gemmell. The exterior is faced with stone and is distinguished by its pointed bell-gable.

The High Victorian style is especially marked in the interior, which is in yellow and red brick. The bands of red brick are used for ornamental effect. Granite columns mark the transept, and prominent wooden brackets support the ceiling.

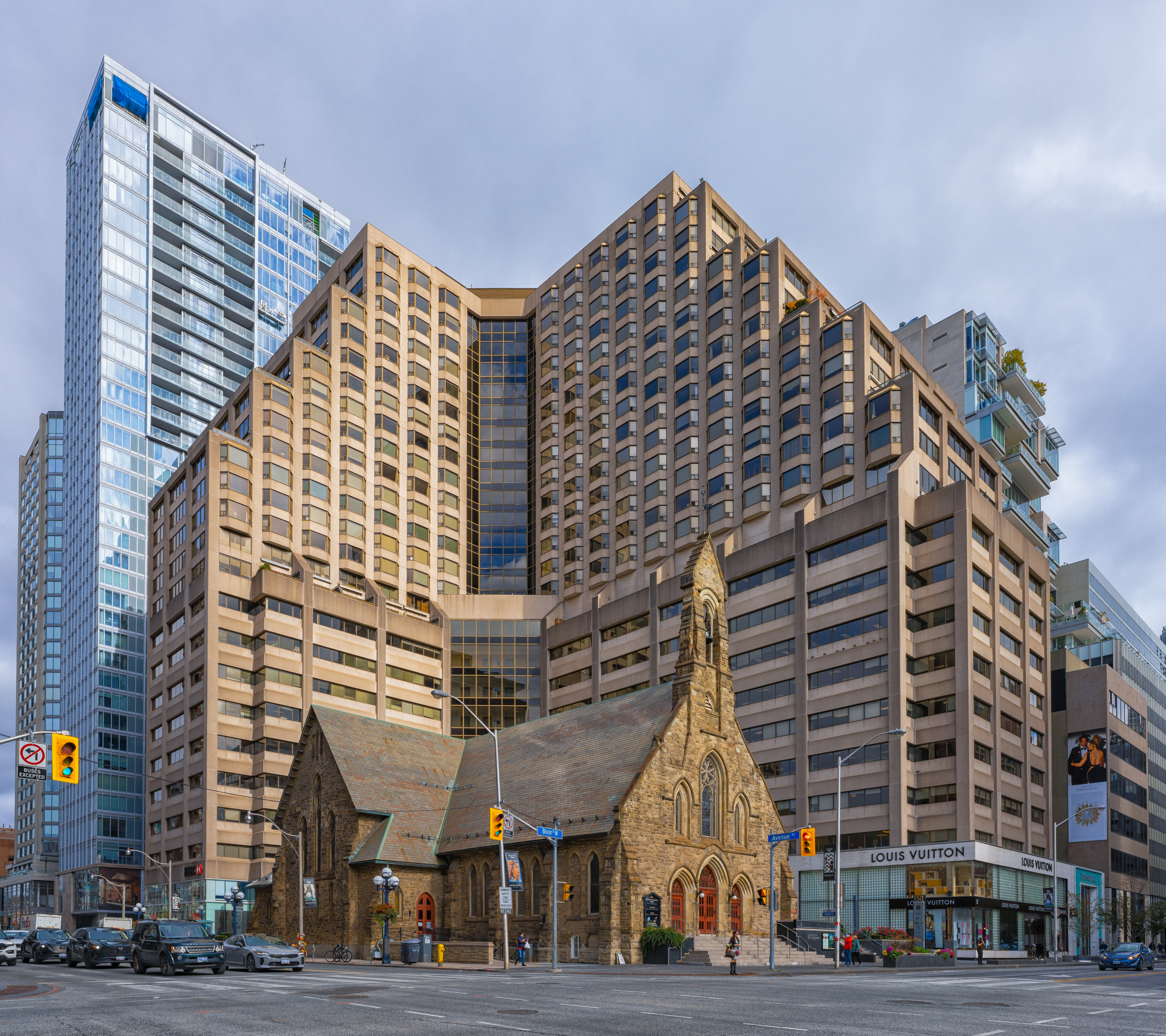
The church building, with high-rises behind it

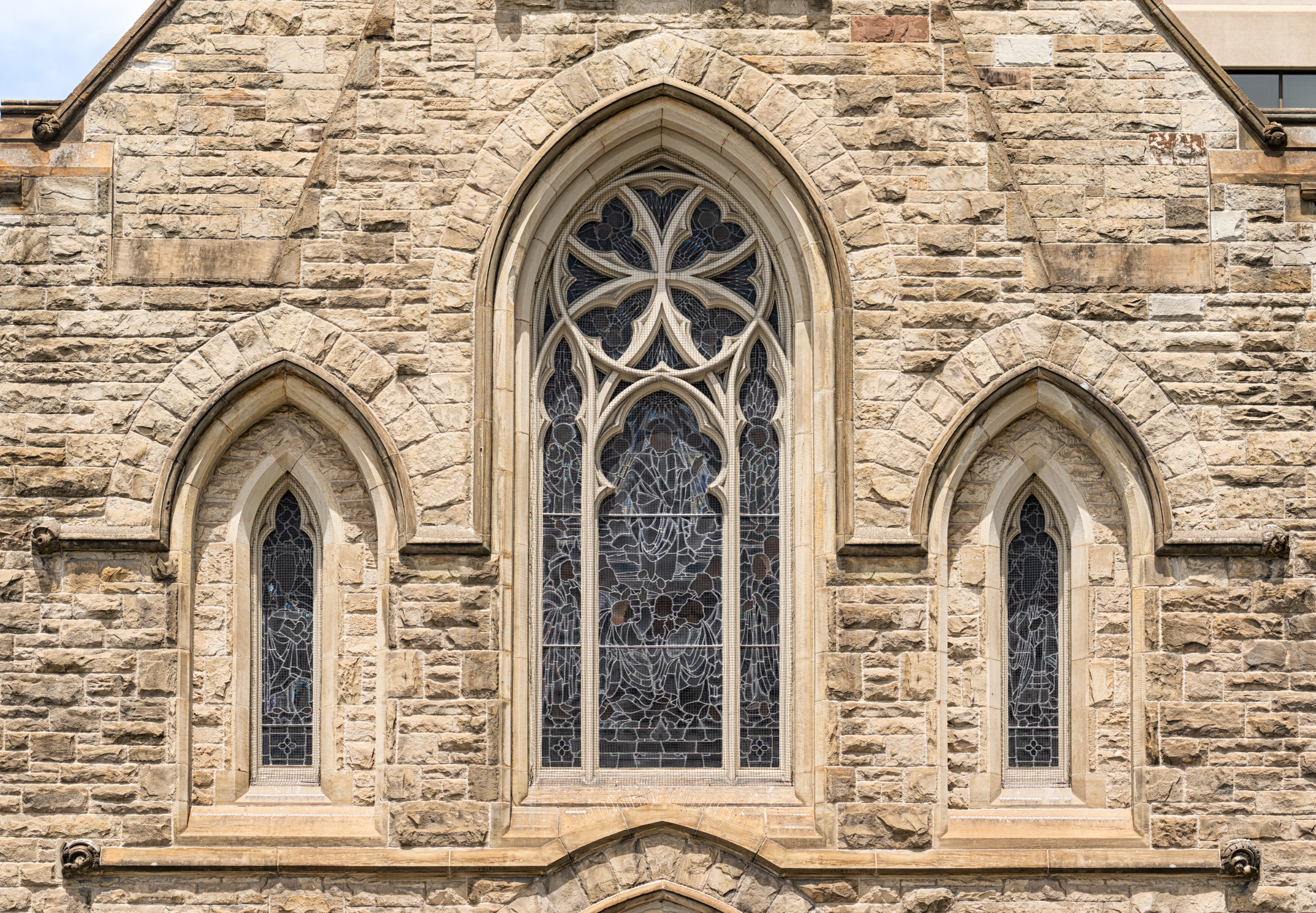
Windows above the front portal

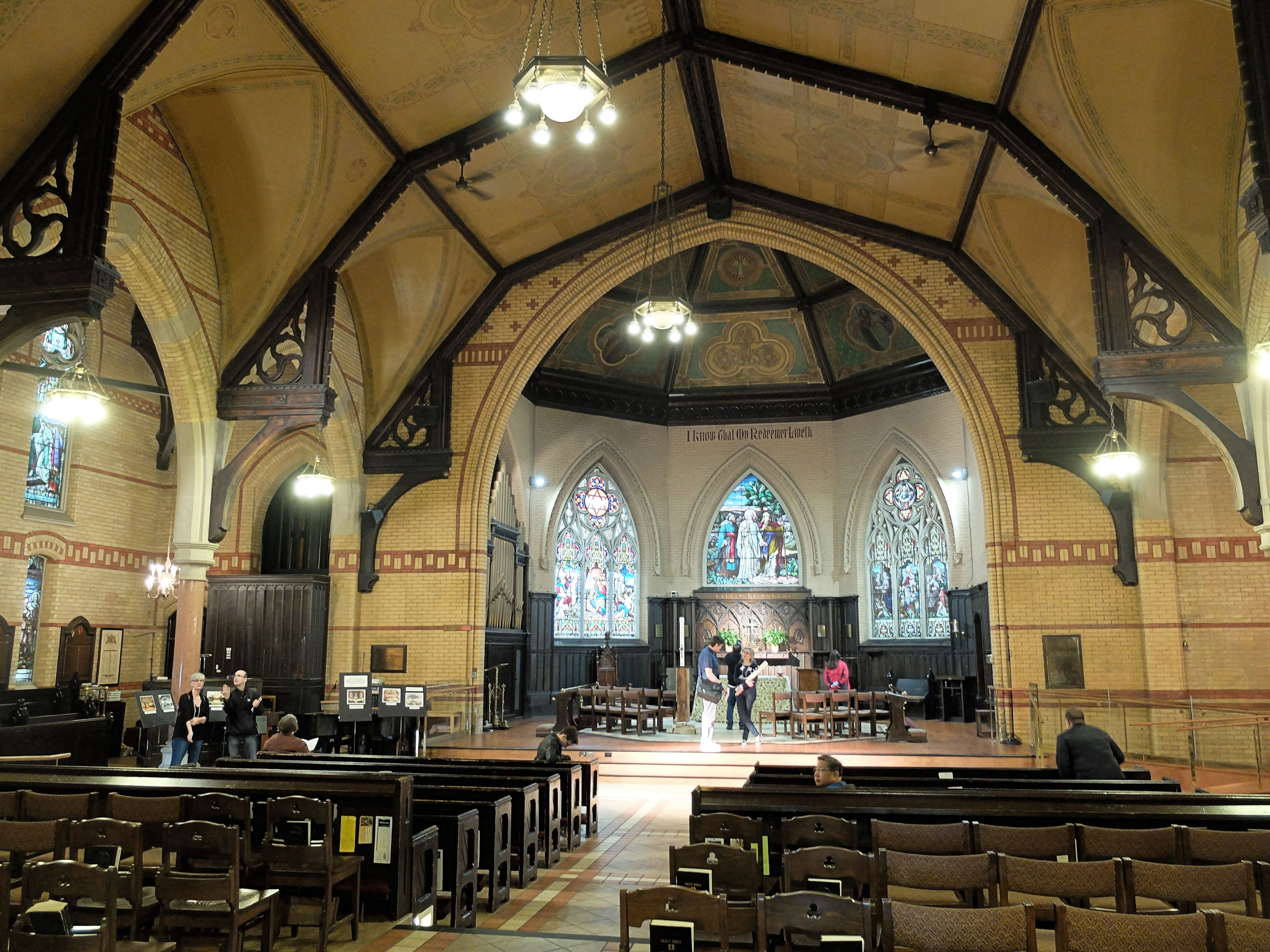
Interior of the church

== See also ==
- List of Anglican churches in Toronto
- When I Was Sick, installed outside the church
